= Uganda =

Country in East Africa

Coordinates: 1°N 32°E

Republic of Uganda
Jamhuri ya Uganda (Swahili)
(in local languages) (Note: Article 4(a) of the Constitution requires the state to promote public awareness through translating it into Ugandan languages and disseminating it as widely as possible)
Luganda	Lipabuliika ya Uganda
Masaaba	Linambo lya Uganda
Soga	Uganda Eryetwala
- Flag Coat of arms
- Motto: "For God and My Country" "Kwa Mungu na nchi yangu"
- Anthem: "Oh Uganda, Land of Beauty"
- Capital and largest city: Kampala
- Official languages: English; Swahili
- Other languages: See Languages of Uganda
- Dialect of English: Uglish
- Ethnic groups (2024 census): 15.3% Baganda; 9.1% Banyankole; 8.1% Basoga; 6.4% Bakiga; 6.8% Iteso; 5.9% Langi; 4.5% Bagisu; 4.2% Acholi; 2.6% Lugbara; 37.1% others
- Religion (2024 census): 81.7% Christianity; 42% Roman Catholic; 29% Protestant; 13.2% Islam; 3.3% unclassified; 1.6% others; 0.2% no religion
- Demonym: Ugandan
- Government: Unitary presidential republic under an authoritarian dictatorship
  - President: Yoweri Museveni
  - Vice President: Jessica Alupo
  - Prime Minister: Robinah Nabbanja
  - Deputy Prime Ministers: Rebecca Kadaga; Crispus Kiyonga; Lukia Isanga Nakadama
  - Speaker of Parliament: Jacob Oboth-Oboth
  - Deputy Speaker of Parliament: Thomas Tayebwa
- Legislature: Parliament

Independence from the United Kingdom
  - Dominion: 9 October 1962
  - Republic declared: 9 October 1963
  - Current constitution: 8 October 1995

Area
  - Total: 241,038 km^{2} (93,065 sq mi) (79th)
  - Water (%): 15.39

Population
  - 2024 census: ▲45,905,417 (35th)
  - Density: 157.1/km^{2} (406.9/sq mi) (75th)
- GDP (PPP): 2025 estimate
  - Total: ▲$187.11 billion (82nd)
  - Per capita: ▲$3,900 (161st)
- GDP (nominal): 2025 estimate
  - Total: ▲$64.280 billion (88th)
  - Per capita: ▲$1,340 (160th)
- Gini (2019): ▲42.7 medium inequality
- HDI (2023): ▲0.582 medium (157th)
- Currency: Ugandan shilling (UGX)
- Time zone: UTC+3 (EAT)
- Calling code: +256
- ISO 3166 code: UG
- Internet TLD: .ug
- 1. +006 from Kenya and Tanzania

Uganda, (Note: Yuganda in Ugandan languages) officially the Republic of Uganda, (Note: Swahili: Jamhuri ya Uganda) and historically known as the Pearl of Africa is a landlocked country in East Africa. It is bordered to the east by Kenya, to the north by South Sudan, to the west by the Democratic Republic of the Congo, to the south-west by Rwanda, and to the south by Tanzania. The southern part includes a substantial portion of Lake Victoria, shared with Kenya and Tanzania. Uganda is in the African Great Lakes region, lies within the Nile basin, and has a varied equatorial climate. As of 2024, it had a population of 45.9 million, of whom 1.8 million live in the capital and largest city, Kampala.

Uganda is named after the Buganda kingdom, which encompasses a large portion of the south, including Kampala, and whose language Luganda is widely spoken; the official language is English, while Swahili is the second official language. The region was populated by people of various ethnicities before Bantu and Nilotic groups arrived around 3,000 years ago. These new inhabitants established influential kingdoms such as the Empire of Kitara. The arrival of Arab traders in the 1830s and British explorers in the late 19th century marked the beginning of foreign influence. The British established the Protectorate of Uganda in 1894, setting the stage for future political dynamics.

Uganda gained independence in 1962, with Milton Obote as the first prime minister. The 1966 Mengo Crisis marked a significant conflict with the Buganda kingdom, as well as the country's conversion from a parliamentary system to a presidential system. Obote was overthrown in a military coup in 1971 by Idi Amin, who subsequently ruled the country under a brutal dictatorship until he was overthrown in 1979 during the Uganda–Tanzania War.

Obote returned to power following the controversial 1980 Ugandan general election, prompting a six-year guerrilla war, ending with the victory of Yoweri Museveni's National Resistance Movement in 1986. While Museveni's rule resulted in stability and economic growth, political oppression and human rights abuses continued. The abolition of presidential term limits as well as allegations of electoral fraud and repression have raised concerns about Uganda's democratic future. Museveni was elected president in the 2011, 2016, 2021, and 2026 general elections. Human rights issues, corruption, and regional conflicts, such as involvement in the Congo Wars and the struggle against the Lord's Resistance Army (LRA), continue to challenge Uganda. Despite this, it has made progress in education and health, improving literacy and reducing HIV infection, though challenges in maternal health and gender inequality persist.

Geographically, Uganda is diverse, with volcanic hills, mountains, and lakes, including Lake Victoria, the world's second-largest freshwater lake. The country has significant natural resources, including fertile agricultural land and untapped oil reserves, contributing to its economic development. The service sector dominates the economy, surpassing agriculture. Uganda's rich biodiversity, with national parks and wildlife reserves, attracts tourism, a vital sector for the economy. Uganda is a member of the United Nations, the Commonwealth of Nations, the African Union, G77, the East African Community, and the Organisation of Islamic Cooperation.

== History ==
=== Precolonial Uganda ===
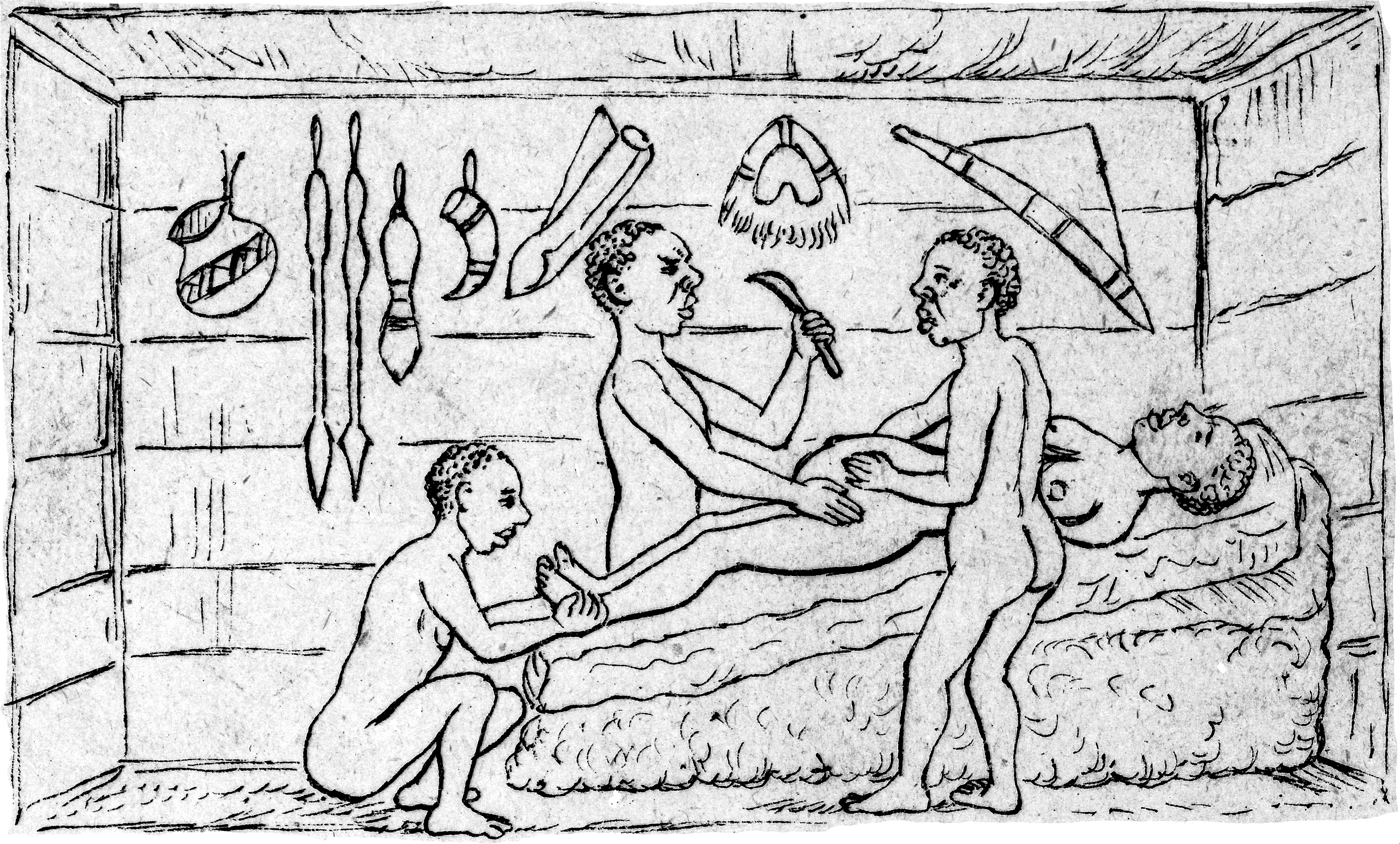
A caesarean section performed by indigenous healers in Kahura, in the kingdom of Bunyoro, present-day Uganda, as observed by medical missionary Robert William Felkin in 1879

Much of Uganda was inhabited by Central Sudanic- and Kuliak-speaking farmers and herders until 3,000 years ago, when Bantu speakers arrived in the south and Nilotic speakers arrived in the northeast. By 1500 AD, they had all been assimilated into Bantu-speaking cultures south of Mount Elgon, the Nile River, and Lake Kyoga. According to oral tradition and archaeological studies, the Empire of Kitara covered an important part of the Great Lakes Area, from the northern lakes Albert and Kyoga to the southern lakes Victoria and Tanganyika. Kitara is claimed as the antecedent of the Tooro, Ankole, and Busoga kingdoms. Some Luo invaded Kitara and assimilated with the Bantu society there, establishing the Biito dynasty of the current Omukama (ruler) of Bunyoro-Kitara.

Arab traders moved into the land from the Indian Ocean coast of East Africa in the 1830s for trade and commerce. In the late 1860s, Bunyoro in Mid-Western Uganda found itself threatened from the north by Egyptian-sponsored agents. Unlike the Arab traders from the East African coast who sought trade, these agents were promoting foreign conquest. In 1869, Khedive Ismail Pasha of Egypt, seeking to annex the territories north of the borders of Lake Victoria and east of Lake Albert and "south of Gondokoro", sent a British explorer, Samuel Baker, on a military expedition to the frontiers of Northern Uganda, with the objective of suppressing the slave-trade there and opening the way to commerce and "civilization".

The Banyoro resisted Baker, who had to fight a desperate battle to secure his retreat. Baker regarded the resistance as an act of treachery, and he denounced the Banyoro in a book (Ismailia – A Narrative Of The Expedition To Central Africa For The Suppression Of Slave Trade, Organised By Ismail, Khadive Of Egypt (1874)) that was widely read in Britain. Later, the British arrived in Uganda with a predisposition against the kingdom of Bunyoro and sided with the kingdom of Buganda. This eventually cost Bunyoro half of its territory, which was given to Buganda as a reward from the British. Two of the numerous "lost counties" were restored to Bunyoro after independence.

In the 1860s, while Arabs sought influence from the north, British explorers searching for the source of the Nile arrived in Uganda. They were followed by British Anglican missionaries who arrived in the kingdom of Buganda in 1877 and French Catholic missionaries in 1879. This situation gave rise to the death of the Uganda Martyrs in 1885—after the conversion of Muteesa I and much of his court, and the succession of his anti-Christian son Mwanga. The British government chartered the Imperial British East Africa Company (IBEAC) to negotiate trade agreements in the region beginning in 1888.

From 1886, there was a series of religious wars in Buganda, initially between Muslims and Christians and then, from 1890, between "ba-Ingleza" Protestants and "ba-Fransa" Catholics. These factions were named after the imperial powers with which they were aligned. Because of civil unrest and financial burdens, IBEAC claimed that it was unable to "maintain their occupation" in the region. The British government sought to protect its interests along the Nile trade route and established the Uganda Protectorate in 1894.

=== Uganda Protectorate (1894–1962) ===
The flag of the Protectorate of Uganda

The Protectorate of Uganda was a protectorate of the British Empire from 1894 to 1962. In 1893, the Imperial British East Africa Company transferred its administration rights of territory consisting mainly of the Kingdom of Buganda to the British government. The IBEAC relinquished its control over Uganda after Ugandan internal religious wars had driven it into bankruptcy.

In 1894, the Uganda Protectorate was established, and the territory was extended beyond the borders of Buganda by signing more treaties with the other kingdoms (Toro in 1900, Ankole in 1901, and Bunyoro in 1933) to an area that roughly corresponds to that of present-day Uganda.

The status of protectorate meant that Uganda retained a degree of self-government that would have otherwise been limited under a full colonial administration, compared to neighbouring Kenya, which had been made a colony.

In the 1890s, 32,000 labourers from British India were recruited to East Africa under indentured labour contracts to construct the Uganda Railway. Most of the surviving Indians returned home, but 6,724 decided to remain in East Africa after the line's completion. Subsequently, some became traders and took control of cotton ginning and sartorial retail.

From 1900 to 1920, a sleeping sickness epidemic in the southern part of Uganda, along the north shores of Lake Victoria, killed more than 250,000 people.

=== Independence (1962–1965) ===
Uganda gained independence from the UK on 9 October 1962 with Queen Elizabeth II as head of state and Queen of Uganda. In 1963, Uganda replaced the Queen as head of state with a ceremonial president, elected from among the country’s traditional kings, whilst maintaining its membership in the Commonwealth of Nations. The position of governor-general of Uganda (who served as representative of the Queen) was abolished in October 1963, one year after independence, although the country would not officially proclaim itself a republic until the 1966 crisis.

The first post-independence election, held in 1962, was won by an alliance between the Uganda People's Congress (UPC) and Kabaka Yekka (KY). UPC and KY formed the first post-independence government with Milton Obote as executive prime minister, with the Buganda Kabaka (King) Edward Muteesa II holding the largely ceremonial position of president.

=== Buganda crisis (1962–1966) ===
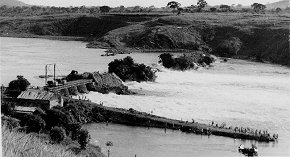
Construction of the Owen Falls Dam in Jinja

Uganda's immediate post-independence years were dominated by the relationship between the central government and the largest regional kingdom, Buganda.

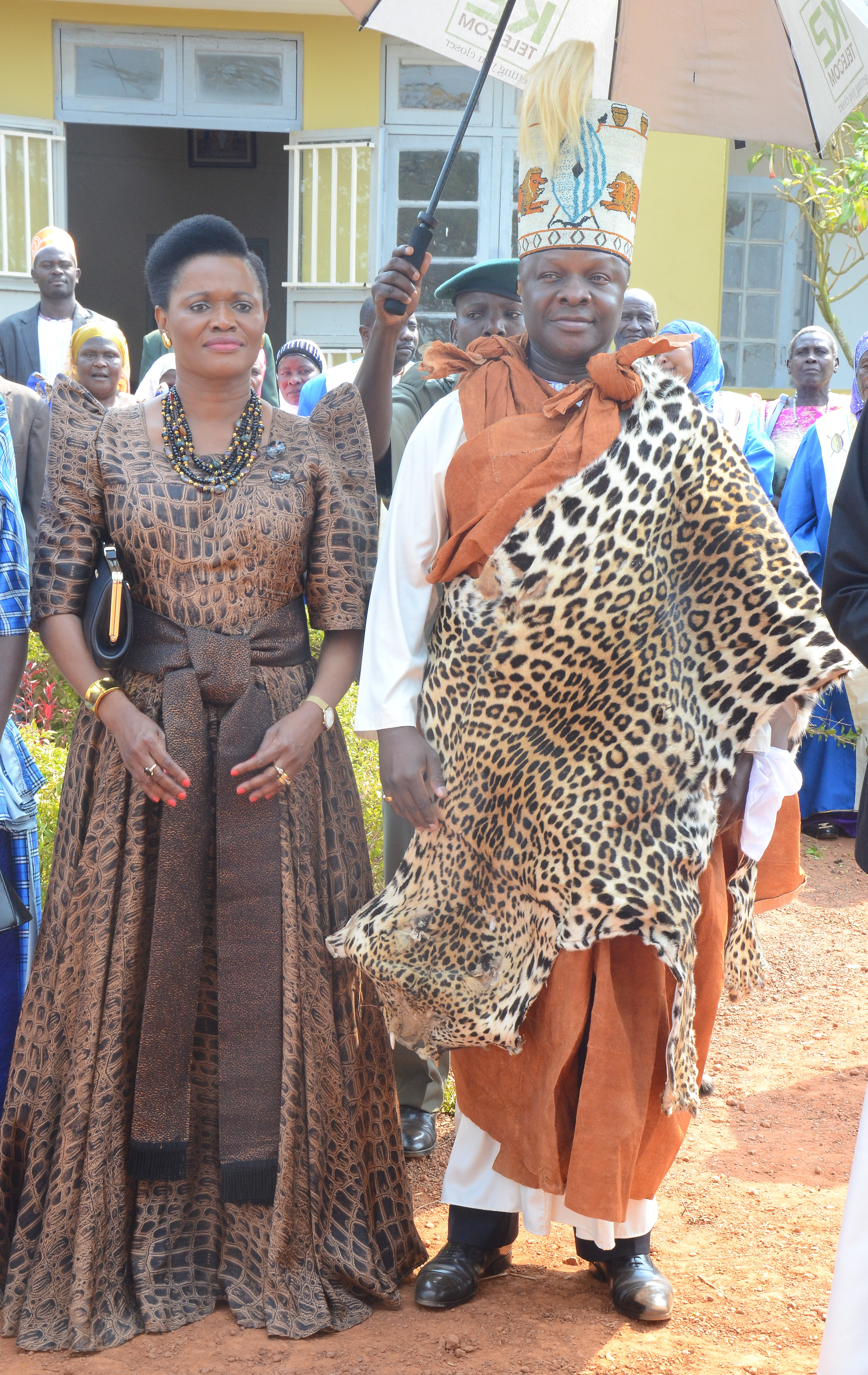
Kabaka Muwenda Mutebi II and his wife Sylvia Nagginda

The issue of how to manage the largest monarchy within the framework of a unitary state had been a problem since the British creation of the Protectorate of Uganda. Colonial governors had failed to come up with a formula that worked. This was further complicated by Buganda's nonchalant attitude to its relationship with the central government. Buganda never sought independence but rather appeared to be comfortable with a loose arrangement that guaranteed them privileges above the other subjects within the protectorate or a special status when the British left. This was evidenced in part by hostilities between the British colonial authorities and Buganda prior to independence.

Within Buganda, there were divisions between those who wanted the Kabaka to remain a dominant monarch and those who wanted to join with the rest of Uganda to create a modern secular state. The split resulted in the creation of two dominant Buganda based parties – the Kabaka Yekka (Kabaka Only) KY, and the Democratic Party (DP) that had roots in the Catholic Church. The bitterness between these two parties was extremely intense especially as the first elections for the post-Colonial parliament approached. The Kabaka particularly disliked the DP leader, Benedicto Kiwanuka.

Outside Buganda, a soft-spoken politician from Northern Uganda, Milton Obote, had forged an alliance of non-Buganda politicians to form the Uganda People's Congress (UPC). The UPC at its heart was dominated by politicians who wanted to rectify what they saw as the regional inequality that favoured Buganda's special status. This drew in substantial support from outside Buganda. The party, however, remained a loose alliance of interests, but Obote showed great skill at negotiating them into a common ground based on a federal formula.

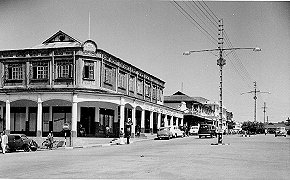
The Uganda printers building on Kampala Road, Kampala, Uganda

At Independence, the Buganda question remained unresolved. Uganda was one of the few colonial territories that achieved independence without a dominant political party with a clear majority in parliament. In the pre-Independence elections, the UPC ran no candidates in Buganda and won 37 of the 61 directly elected seats (outside Buganda). The DP won 24 seats outside Buganda. The "special status" granted to Buganda meant that the 21 Buganda seats were elected by proportional representation reflecting the elections to the Buganda parliament – the Lukikko. KY won all 21 seats.

The UPC reached a peak at the end of 1964 when the leader of the DP in parliament, Basil Kiiza Bataringaya, crossed the parliamentary floor with five other MPs, leaving DP with only nine seats. The DP MPs were not particularly happy that the hostility of their leader, Benedicto Kiwanuka, towards the Kabaka was hindering their chances of compromise with KY. The trickle of defections turned into a flood when 10 KY members crossed the floor when they realised the formal coalition with the UPC was no longer viable. Obote's charismatic speeches across the country were sweeping all before him, and the UPC was winning almost every local election held and increasing its control over all district councils and legislatures outside Buganda. The response from the Kabaka was mute – probably content in his ceremonial role and symbolism in his part of the country. However, there were also major divisions within his palace that made it difficult for him to act effectively against Obote. By the time Uganda had become independent, Buganda "was a divided house with contending social and political forces".

There were problems brewing inside the UPC. As its ranks swelled, the ethnic, religious, regional, and personal interests began to shake the party. The party's apparent strength was eroded in a complex sequence of factional conflicts in its central and regional structures. And by 1966, the UPC was tearing itself apart. The conflicts were further intensified by the newcomers who had crossed the parliamentary floor from DP and KY.

The UPC delegates arrived in Gulu in 1964 for their delegates conference. The battle over the Secretary-General of the party was a bitter contest between the new moderate's candidate – Grace Ibingira and the radical John Kakonge. Ibingira subsequently became the symbol of the opposition to Obote within the UPC. For those outside the UPC (including KY supporters), this was a sign that Obote was vulnerable.

The collapse of the UPC-KY alliance openly revealed the dissatisfaction Obote and others had about Buganda's "special status". In 1964, the government responded to demands from some parts of the vast Buganda Kingdom that they were not the Kabaka's subjects. Prior to colonial rule, Buganda had been rivalled by the neighbouring Bunyoro kingdom. Buganda had conquered parts of Bunyoro and the British colonialists had formalised this in the Buganda Agreements. Known as the "lost counties", the people in these areas wished to revert to being part of Bunyoro. Obote decided to allow a referendum, which angered the Kabaka and most of the rest of Buganda. The residents of the counties voted to return to Bunyoro despite the Kabaka's attempts to influence the vote. Having lost the referendum, KY opposed the bill to pass the counties to Bunyoro, thus ending the alliance with the UPC.

The UPC, which had previously been a national party, began to break along tribal lines when Ibingira challenged Obote in the UPC. The "North/South" ethnic divide that had been evident in economic and social spheres now entrenched itself in politics. Obote surrounded himself with mainly northern politicians, while Ibingira's supporters who were subsequently arrested and jailed with him, were mainly from the South. In time, the two factions acquired ethnic labels – "Bantu" (the mainly Southern Ibingira faction) and "Nilotic" (the mainly Northern Obote faction). The perception that the government was at war with the Bantu was further enhanced when Obote arrested and imprisoned the mainly Bantu ministers who backed Ibingira.

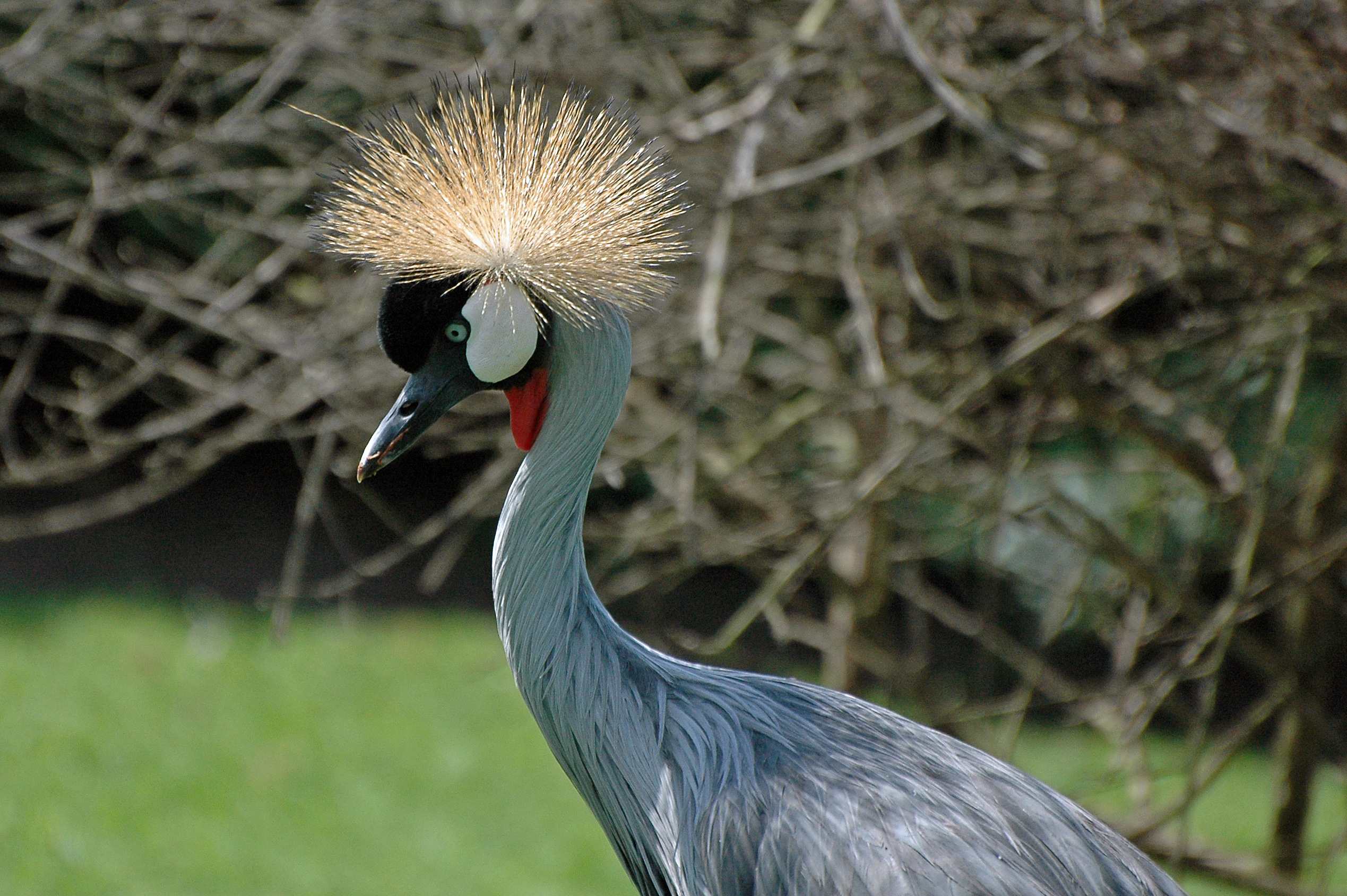
A Grey Crowned Crane – a symbol of Uganda

These labels brought into the mix two very powerful influences. First Buganda – the people of Buganda are Bantu and therefore naturally aligned to the Ibingira faction. The Ibingira faction further advanced this alliance by accusing Obote of wanting to overthrow the Kabaka. They were now aligned to opposing Obote. Second – the security forces – the British colonialists had recruited the army and police almost exclusively from Northern Uganda due to their perceived suitability for these roles. At independence, the army and police was dominated by northern tribes – mainly Nilotic. They would now feel more affiliated to Obote, and he took full advantage of this to consolidate his power. In April 1966, Obote passed out eight hundred new army recruits at Moroto, of whom seventy per cent came from the Northern Region.

At the time, there was a tendency to perceive central government and security forces as dominated by "northerners," particularly the Acholi who through the UPC had significant access to government positions at the national level. In northern Uganda there were also varied degrees of anti-Buganda feelings, particularly over the kingdom's "special status" before and after independence, and all the economic and social benefits that came with this status. "Obote brought significant numbers of northerners into the central state, both through the civil service and military, and created a patronage machine in Northern Uganda".

However, both "Bantu" and "Nilotic" labels represent significant ambiguities. The Bantu category for example includes both Buganda and Bunyoro – historically bitter rivals. The Nilotic label includes the Lugbara, Acholi, and Langi, all of whom have bitter rivalries that were to define Uganda's military politics later. Despite these ambiguities, these events unwittingly brought to fore the northerner/southerner political divide which to some extent still influences Ugandan politics.

The UPC fragmentation continued as opponents sensed Obote's vulnerability. At local level where the UPC dominated most councils discontent began to challenge incumbent council leaders. Even in Obote's home district, attempts were made to oust the head of the local district council in 1966. A more worrying fact for the UPC was that the next national elections loomed in 1967 – and without the support of KY (who were now likely to back the DP), and the growing factionalism in the UPC, there was the real possibility that the UPC would be out of power in months.

Obote went after KY with a new act of parliament in early 1966 that blocked any attempt by KY to expand outside Buganda. KY appeared to respond in parliament through one of their few remaining MPs, the terminally ill Daudi Ochieng. Ochieng was an irony – although from Northern Uganda, he had risen high in the ranks of KY and become a close confidant to the Kabaka who had gifted him with large land titles in Buganda. In Obote's absence from Parliament, Ochieng laid bare the illegal plundering of ivory and gold from the Congo that had been orchestrated by Obote's army chief of staff, Colonel Idi Amin. He further alleged that Obote, Onama and Neykon had all benefited from the scheme. Parliament overwhelmingly voted in favour of a motion to censure Amin and investigate Obote's involvement. This led to raised tensions in the country.

KY further demonstrated its ability to challenge Obote from within his party at the UPC Buganda conference, where the Attorney General, Godfrey Binaisa, was ousted by a faction believed to have the backing of KY, Ibingira and other anti-Obote elements in Buganda. Obote's response was to arrest Ibingira and other ministers at a cabinet meeting and to assume special powers in February 1966. In March 1966, Obote also announced that the offices of President and vice-president would cease to exist – effectively dismissing the Kabaka.

Obote also gave Amin more power – giving him the Army Commander position over the previous holder, Opolot, who had relations to Buganda through marriage, possibly believing Opolot would be reluctant to take military action against the Kabaka if it came to that. Obote abolished the constitution and effectively suspended elections due in a few months. Obote went on television and radio to accuse the Kabaka of various offences including requesting foreign troops which appears to have been explored by the Kabaka following the rumours of Amin plotting a coup. Obote further dismantled the authority of the Kabaka by announcing among other measures:

- The abolition of independent public service commissions for federal units. This removed the Kabaka's authority to appoint civil servants in Buganda.
- The abolition of the Buganda High Court – removing any judicial authority the Kabaka had.
- The bringing of Buganda financial management under further central control.
- Abolition of lands for Buganda chiefs. Land is one of the key sources of Kabaka's power over his subjects.

This set the stage for a conflict between Buganda and the central government. Within Buganda's political institutions, rivalries driven by religion and personal ambition made the institutions ineffective and unable to respond to the central government moves. The Kabaka was often regarded as aloof and unresponsive to advice from the younger Buganda politicians who better understood the new post-Independence politics, unlike the traditionalists who were ambivalent to what was going on as long as their traditional benefits were maintained. The Kabaka favoured the neo-traditionalists.

In May 1966, the Kabaka asked for foreign help, and the Buganda parliament demanded that the Uganda government leave Buganda, including the capital, Kampala. In response Obote ordered Idi Amin to attack the Kabaka's palace. The battle for the Kabaka's palace was fierce – the Kabaka's guards putting up more resistance than had been expected. The British trained Captain – the Kabaka with about 120 armed men kept Idi Amin at bay for twelve hours. It is estimated that up to 2,000 people died in the battle which ended when the army called in heavier guns and overran the palace. The anticipated countryside uprising in Buganda did not materialise and a few hours later a beaming Obote met the press to relish his victory. The Kabaka escaped over the palace walls and was transported into exile in London by supporters.

=== Before the coup (1966–1971) ===
In 1966, following a power struggle between the Obote-led government and King Muteesa, Obote suspended the constitution and removed the ceremonial president and vice-president. In 1967, a new constitution proclaimed Uganda a republic and abolished the traditional kingdoms. Obote was declared the president.

=== Idi Amin's regime (1971–1979) ===
After a military coup on 25 January 1971, Obote was deposed from power and General Idi Amin seized control of the country. Amin ruled Uganda as dictator with the support of the military for the next eight years. He carried out mass killings within the country to maintain his rule. An estimated 80,000–500,000 Ugandans died during his regime. Aside from his brutalities, he forcibly removed the entrepreneurial Indian minority from Uganda.

In June 1976, Palestinian terrorists hijacked an Air France flight and forced it to land at Entebbe airport. One hundred of the 250 passengers originally on board were held hostage until an Israeli commando raid rescued them ten days later.

Amin's reign ended in 1979 during the Uganda–Tanzania War, in which Tanzanian forces aided by Ugandan exiles invaded the country. Tanzanian president Julius Nyerere supported the intervention with the hope of returning his ally, Obote, to power.

=== 1979–present ===
Belligerents of the Second Congo War. In 2005, the International Court of Justice ruled against Uganda, in a case brought by the Democratic Republic of the Congo, for illegal invasion of its territory, and violation of human rights.

In 1980, the Ugandan Bush War broke out, leading to Yoweri Museveni becoming president. His forces toppled the previous regime in January 1986.

From 1986, political parties in Uganda were restricted in their activities, in a measure ostensibly designed to reduce sectarian violence. In the non-party "Movement" system instituted by Museveni, political parties continued to exist, but they could operate only a headquarters office. They could not open branches, hold rallies, or field candidates directly, although electoral candidates could belong to political parties. In July 2005, a constitutional referendum cancelled this nineteen-year ban on multi-party politics.

In the mid-to-late 1990s, Museveni was lauded by Western countries as part of a new generation of African leaders. His presidency has been marred, however, by invading and occupying the Democratic Republic of the Congo during the Second Congo War, resulting in an estimated 5.4 million deaths since 1998, and by participating in other conflicts in the Great Lakes region of Africa. He has struggled for years in the civil war against the Lord's Resistance Army, which has been guilty of numerous crimes against humanity, including child slavery, the Atiak massacre, and other mass murders. Conflict in northern Uganda has killed thousands and displaced millions.

Parliament abolished presidential term limits in 2005, allegedly because Museveni used public funds to pay US$2,000 to each member of parliament who supported the measure. Presidential elections were held in February 2006. Museveni ran against several candidates, the most prominent of them being Kizza Besigye.

On 20 February 2011, the Uganda Electoral Commission declared Museveni the winning candidate of the 2011 elections that were held on 18 February 2011. The opposition were not satisfied with the results, condemning them as full of sham and rigging. According to the official results, Museveni won with 68 per cent of the votes. This easily topped his nearest challenger, Besigye, who had been Museveni's physician and told reporters that he and his supporters "downrightly snub" the outcome as well as the unremitting rule of Museveni or any person he may appoint. Besigye added that the rigged elections would definitely lead to an illegitimate leadership and that it is up to Ugandans to critically analyse this. The European Union's Election Observation Mission reported on improvements and flaws of the Ugandan electoral process: "The electoral campaign and polling day were conducted in a peaceful manner. However, the electoral process was marred by avoidable administrative and logistical failures that led to an unacceptable number of Ugandan citizens being disfranchised."

Since August 2012, hacktivist group Anonymous has threatened Ugandan officials and hacked official government websites over its anti-gay bills. Some international donors have threatened to cut financial aid to the country if anti-gay bills continue.

Indicators of a plan for succession by the president's son, Muhoozi Kainerugaba, have increased tensions.

In the 2021 elections Museveni won with 58% of the vote, while popstar-turned-politician Bobi Wine had 35%. The opposition challenged the result because of allegations of widespread fraud and irregularities. Another opposition candidate was 24-year-old John Katumba.

Museveni has ruled the country since 1986. He was last re-elected in the January 2026 presidential elections.

== Geography ==
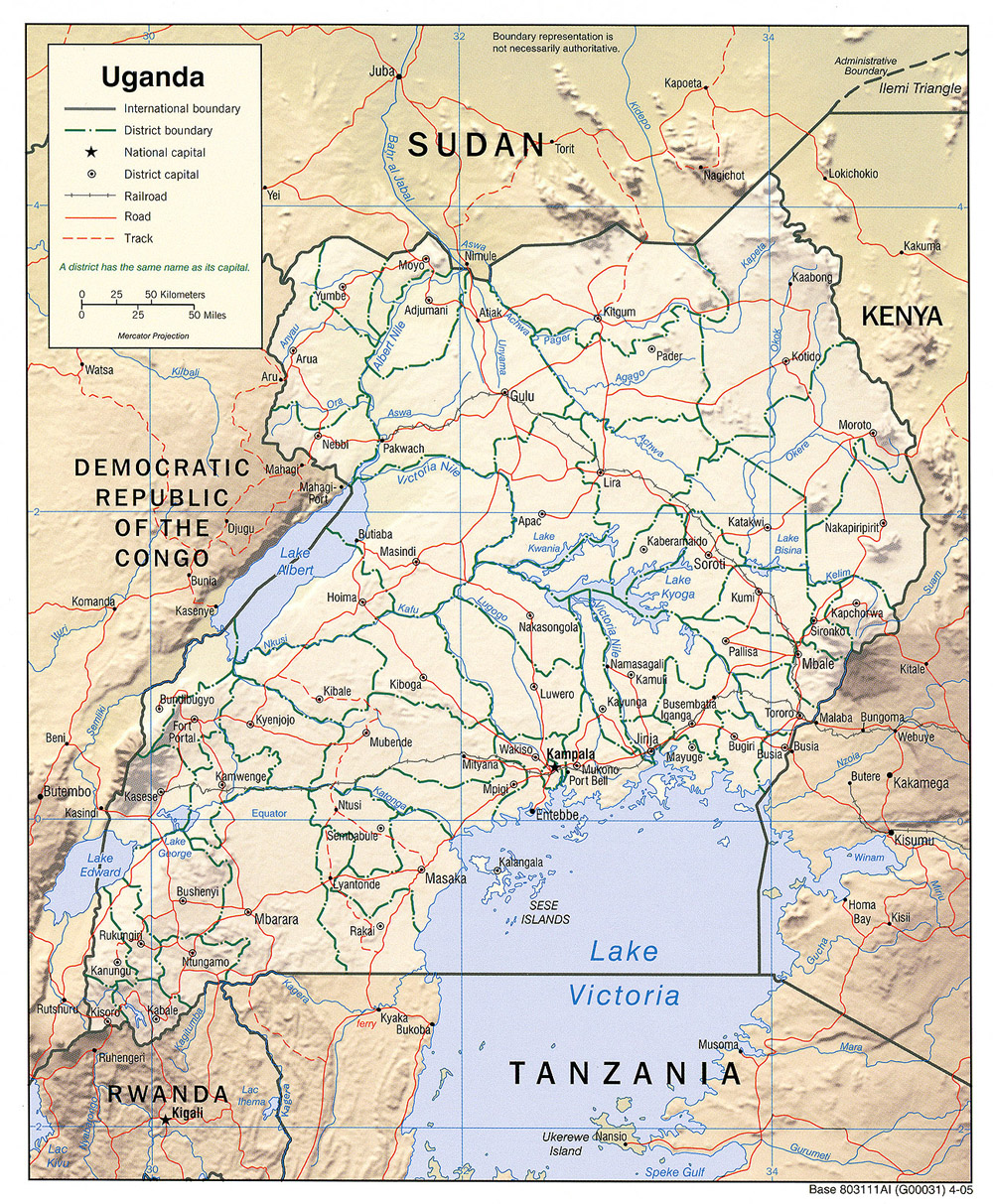
A topographic map of Uganda

Uganda is located in southeast Africa between 1º S and 4º N latitude, and between 30º E and 35º E longitude. Its geography is very diverse, consisting of volcanic hills, mountains, and lakes. The country sits at an average of 900 meters above sea level. Both the eastern and western borders of Uganda have mountains. The western Ruwenzori mountain range contains Mount Stanley, the highest peak in both Uganda and the Democratic Republic of the Congo, with an elevation of 5,109 metres (16,762 ft). The east on the border with Kenya has volcanic Mount Elgon with its highest peak, Wagagai (4,321 metres (14,177 ft)), in Uganda.

=== Lakes and rivers ===
Much of the south of the country is heavily influenced by one of the world's biggest lakes, Lake Victoria, which contains many islands. The most important cities are located in the south, near this lake, including the capital Kampala and the nearby city of Entebbe. Lake Kyoga is in the centre of the country and is surrounded by extensive marshy areas.

Although landlocked, Uganda contains many large lakes. Besides Lakes Victoria and Kyoga, there are Lake Albert, Lake Edward, and the smaller Lake George. It lies almost completely within the Nile basin. The Victoria Nile drains from Lake Victoria into Lake Kyoga and thence into Lake Albert on the Congolese border. It then runs northwards into South Sudan. An area in eastern Uganda is drained by the Suam River, part of the internal drainage basin of Lake Turkana. The extreme north-eastern part of Uganda drains into the Lotikipi Basin, which is primarily in Kenya.

=== Climate ===
A map of Uganda's Köppen climate classification zones

Uganda has a warm tropical climate with temperatures falling in the 25 to 29 °C (77.0 to 84.2 °F) range on an average. The months from December to February are the hottest, but even during this season the evenings can be pleasant with temperatures in the 17 to 18 °C (62.6 to 64.4 °F) range.

Most of Uganda receives an annual rainfall of 1,000 to 1,500 millimetres or 40 to 60 inches. The rainy seasons are March to May and September to November. During these months, heavy rains can make roads and terrains hard to traverse. January to February and June to August are dry. In the north, there is one rainy season from March to November, and a dry season from December to February.

Climate data for Kampala
Month	Jan	Feb	Mar	Apr	May	Jun	Jul	Aug	Sep	Oct	Nov	Dec	Year
Record high °C (°F)	33 (91)	36 (97)	33 (91)	33 (91)	29 (84)	29 (84)	29 (84)	29 (84)	31 (88)	32 (90)	32 (90)	32 (90)	36 (97)
Mean daily maximum °C (°F)	28.6 (83.5)	29.3 (84.7)	28.7 (83.7)	27.7 (81.9)	27.3 (81.1)	27.1 (80.8)	26.9 (80.4)	27.2 (81.0)	27.9 (82.2)	27.7 (81.9)	27.4 (81.3)	27.9 (82.2)	27.8 (82.0)
Daily mean °C (°F)	23.2 (73.8)	23.7 (74.7)	23.4 (74.1)	22.9 (73.2)	22.6 (72.7)	22.4 (72.3)	22.0 (71.6)	22.2 (72.0)	22.6 (72.7)	22.6 (72.7)	22.5 (72.5)	22.7 (72.9)	22.7 (72.9)
Mean daily minimum °C (°F)	17.7 (63.9)	18.0 (64.4)	18.1 (64.6)	18.0 (64.4)	17.9 (64.2)	17.6 (63.7)	17.1 (62.8)	17.1 (62.8)	17.2 (63.0)	17.4 (63.3)	17.5 (63.5)	17.5 (63.5)	17.6 (63.7)
Record low °C (°F)	12 (54)	14 (57)	13 (55)	14 (57)	15 (59)	12 (54)	12 (54)	12 (54)	13 (55)	13 (55)	14 (57)	12 (54)	12 (54)
Average rainfall mm (inches)	68.4 (2.69)	63.0 (2.48)	131.5 (5.18)	169.3 (6.67)	117.5 (4.63)	69.2 (2.72)	63.1 (2.48)	95.7 (3.77)	108.4 (4.27)	138.0 (5.43)	148.7 (5.85)	91.5 (3.60)	1,264.3 (49.77)
Average rainy days (≥ 1.0 mm)	4.8	5.1	9.5	12.2	10.9	6.3	4.7	6.7	8.6	9.1	8.4	7.4	93.7
Average relative humidity (%)	66	68.5	73	78.5	80.5	78.5	77.5	77.5	75.5	73.5	73	71.5	74.5
Mean monthly sunshine hours	155	170	155	120	124	180	186	155	150	155	150	124	1,824
Source 1: World Meteorological Organization, Climate-Data.org for mean temperatures
Source 2: BBC Weather

Climate data for Gulu
Month	Jan	Feb	Mar	Apr	May	Jun	Jul	Aug	Sep	Oct	Nov	Dec	Year
Mean daily maximum °C (°F)	32.1 (89.8)	32.3 (90.1)	31.2 (88.2)	29.3 (84.7)	28.2 (82.8)	27.7 (81.9)	26.7 (80.1)	26.9 (80.4)	28.1 (82.6)	28.7 (83.7)	29.7 (85.5)	30.4 (86.7)	29.3 (84.7)
Daily mean °C (°F)	24.2 (75.6)	24.6 (76.3)	24.3 (75.7)	23.4 (74.1)	22.8 (73.0)	22.3 (72.1)	21.6 (70.9)	21.7 (71.1)	22.3 (72.1)	22.5 (72.5)	23 (73)	23.2 (73.8)	23.0 (73.4)
Mean daily minimum °C (°F)	16.4 (61.5)	17 (63)	17.5 (63.5)	17.6 (63.7)	17.4 (63.3)	16.9 (62.4)	16.5 (61.7)	16.5 (61.7)	16.5 (61.7)	16.4 (61.5)	16.4 (61.5)	16.1 (61.0)	16.8 (62.2)
Average rainfall mm (inches)	17 (0.7)	32 (1.3)	88 (3.5)	164 (6.5)	182 (7.2)	146 (5.7)	159 (6.3)	217 (8.5)	179 (7.0)	185 (7.3)	102 (4.0)	36 (1.4)	1,507 (59.4)
Source: Climate-Data.org, altitude: 1116m

Climate data for Entebbe, Uganda (1961–1990)
Month	Jan	Feb	Mar	Apr	May	Jun	Jul	Aug	Sep	Oct	Nov	Dec	Year
Record high °C (°F)	31.3 (88.3)	31.7 (89.1)	30.6 (87.1)	30.0 (86.0)	28.9 (84.0)	27.8 (82.0)	28.1 (82.6)	28.9 (84.0)	29.8 (85.6)	29.6 (85.3)	31.7 (89.1)	29.5 (85.1)	31.7 (89.1)
Mean daily maximum °C (°F)	26.3 (79.3)	27.3 (81.1)	26.7 (80.1)	26.0 (78.8)	25.4 (77.7)	25.2 (77.4)	25.3 (77.5)	25.9 (78.6)	26.5 (79.7)	26.5 (79.7)	26.0 (78.8)	26.5 (79.7)	26.1 (79.0)
Mean daily minimum °C (°F)	18.0 (64.4)	18.3 (64.9)	18.5 (65.3)	18.4 (65.1)	18.0 (64.4)	17.8 (64.0)	17.2 (63.0)	17.4 (63.3)	17.4 (63.3)	17.7 (63.9)	17.9 (64.2)	17.8 (64.0)	17.9 (64.2)
Record low °C (°F)	13.0 (55.4)	10.7 (51.3)	14.4 (57.9)	12.2 (54.0)	14.3 (57.7)	14.0 (57.2)	10.0 (50.0)	12.0 (53.6)	13.2 (55.8)	13.9 (57.0)	14.3 (57.7)	13.8 (56.8)	10.0 (50.0)
Average precipitation mm (inches)	86.7 (3.41)	84.4 (3.32)	184.5 (7.26)	264.4 (10.41)	253.8 (9.99)	116.2 (4.57)	72.1 (2.84)	77.8 (3.06)	79.0 (3.11)	127.6 (5.02)	171.7 (6.76)	120.6 (4.75)	1,638.8 (64.52)
Average precipitation days (≥ 1.0 mm)	7.3	7.3	13.1	16.8	16.2	9.4	6.9	6.3	7.1	10.7	13.6	10.2	124.9
Average relative humidity (%)	76	76	77	79	79	78	77	78	76	75	76	76	77
Mean monthly sunshine hours	234	204	205	181	191	187	197	194	194	205	202	214	2,408
Source 1: World Meteorological Organization
Source 2: Deutscher Wetterdienst (extremes and humidity), Danish Meteorological Institute (sun, 1931–1960)

=== Biodiversity and conservation ===
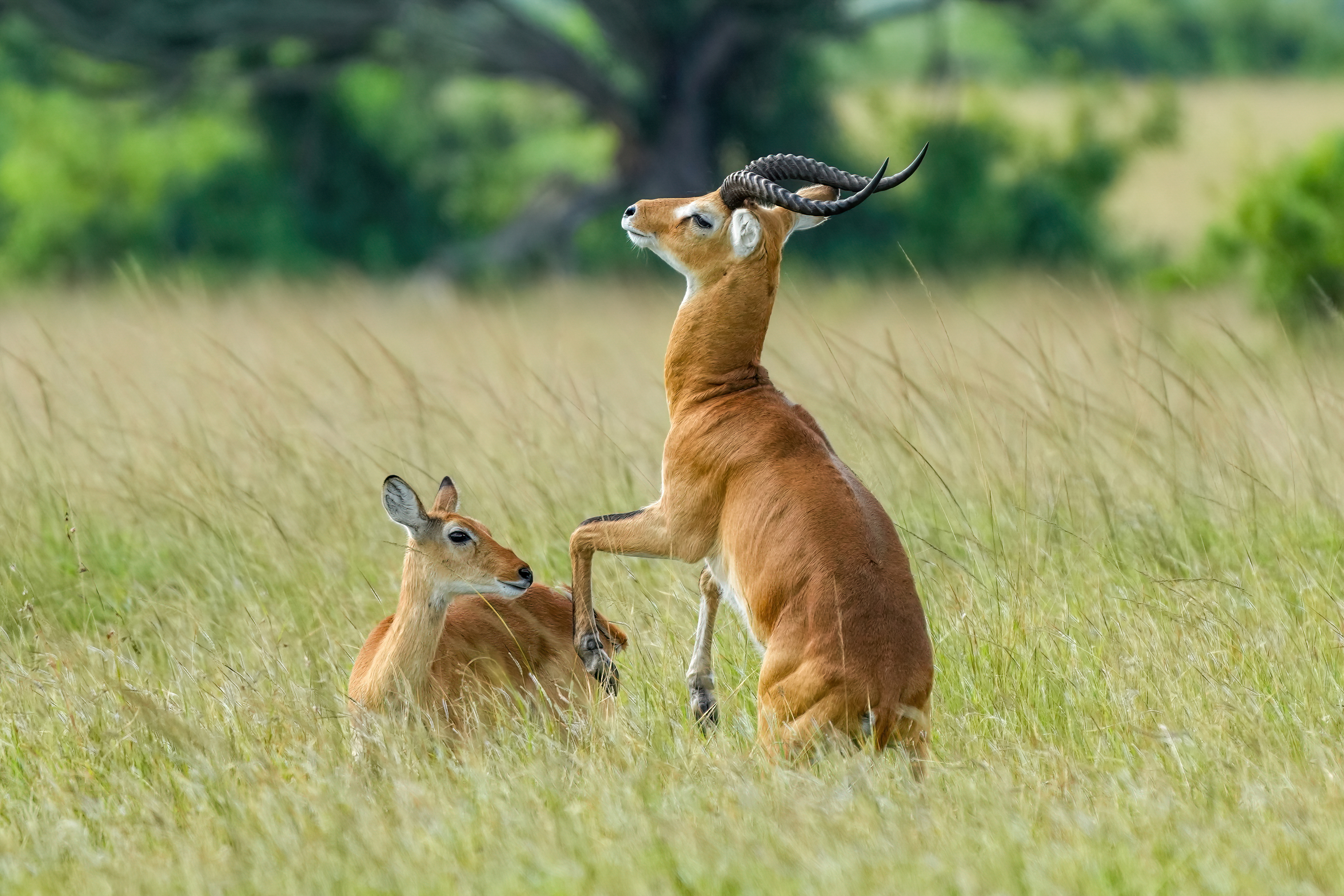
A male kob trying to seduce a female at Queen Elizabeth National Park

Uganda has 60 protected areas, including ten national parks: Bwindi Impenetrable National Park and Rwenzori Mountains National Park (both UNESCO World Heritage Sites), Kibale National Park, Kidepo Valley National Park, Lake Mburo National Park, Mgahinga Gorilla National Park, Mount Elgon National Park, Murchison Falls National Park, Queen Elizabeth National Park, and Semuliki National Park.

Uganda is home to a vast number of species, including a population of mountain gorillas in the Bwindi Impenetrable National Park, gorillas and golden monkeys in the Mgahinga Gorilla National Park, and hippos in the Murchison Falls National Park. Jackfruit can be found throughout Uganda. The country had a 2019 Forest Landscape Integrity Index mean score of 4.36/10, ranking it 128th globally out of 172 countries.

== Government and politics ==
Yoweri Museveni
President

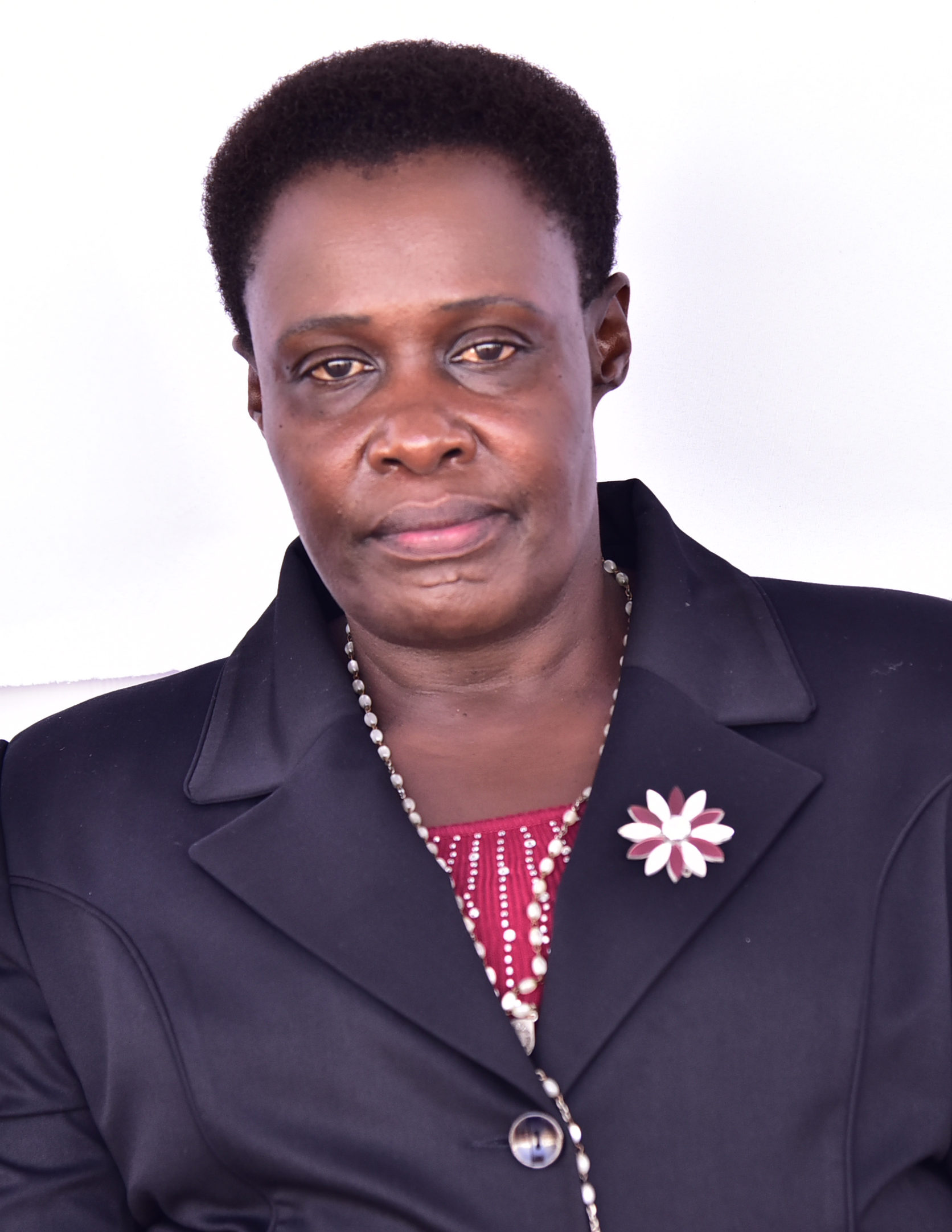
Jessica Alupo
Vice President

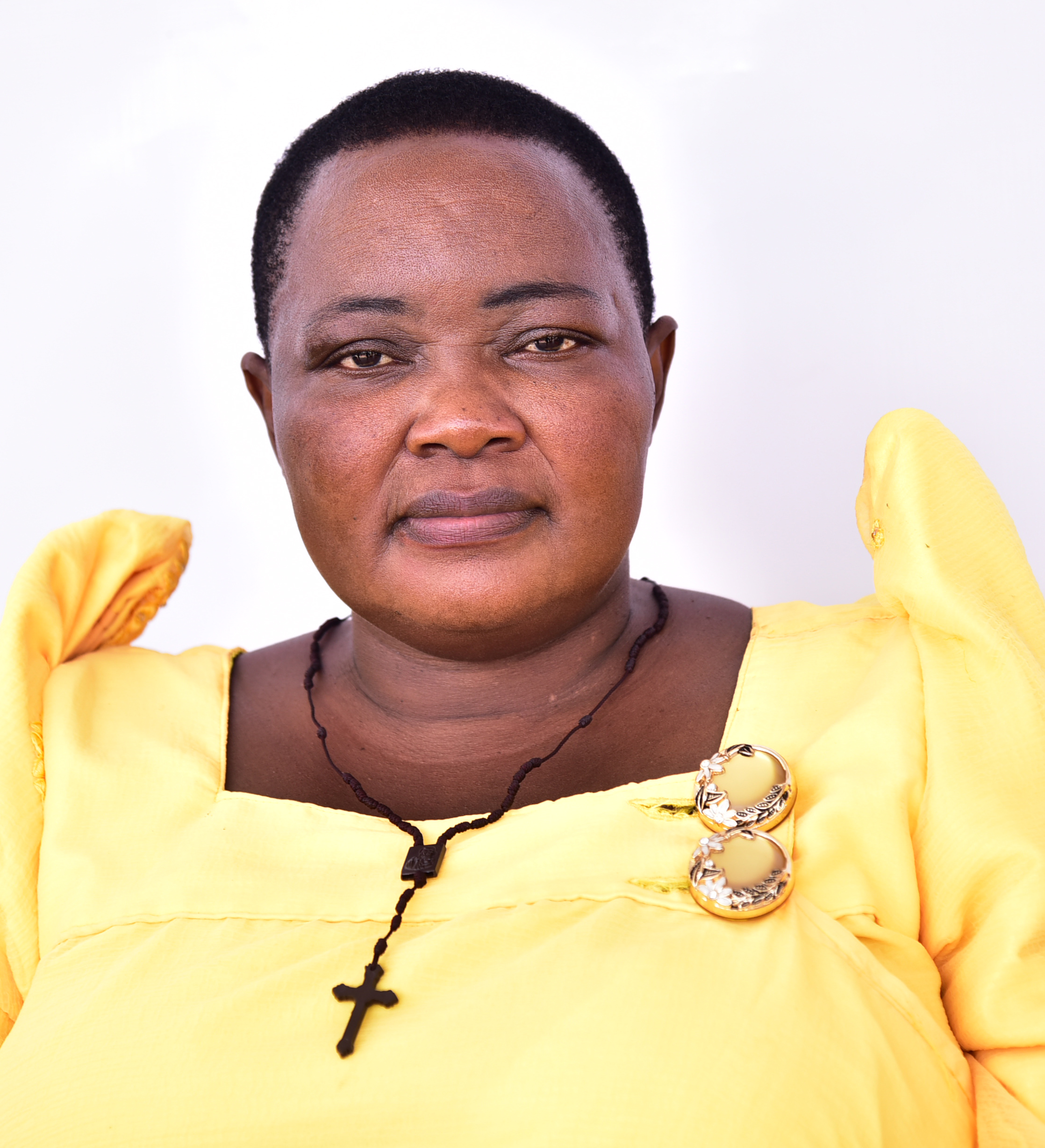
Robinah Nabbanja
Prime Minister

The president of Uganda is both head of state and head of government. The president appoints a vice president and a prime minister to aid them in governing.

The Parliament of Uganda has 557 members. These include constituency representatives, district woman representatives and representatives of the Uganda People's Defense Forces. There are also 5 representatives of the youth, 5 representatives of workers, 5 representatives of persons with disabilities, and 18 ex officio members.

Freedom of the press has been continually infringed upon through the use of intimidation and the Public Order Management Act (2013). Attacks on political freedom in the country, including the arrest and beating of opposition members of parliament, have led to international criticism, culminating in May 2005 in a decision by the British government to withhold part of its aid to the country. The arrest of the main opposition leader Kizza Besigye and the siege of the High Court during a hearing of Besigye's case by heavily armed security forces – before the February 2006 elections – led to condemnation.

=== Foreign relations ===
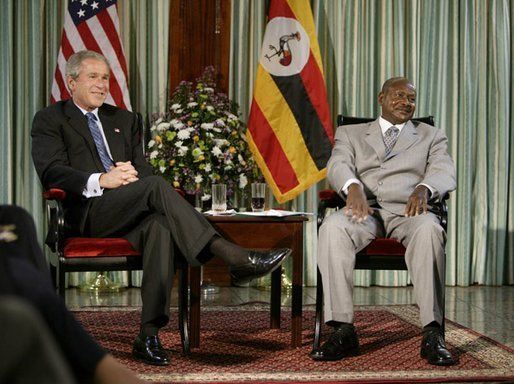
US President George W. Bush met with President Yoweri Museveni in Entebbe, Uganda, July 2003

Uganda is a member of the East African Community (EAC), along with Kenya, Tanzania, Rwanda, Burundi, and South Sudan. According to the East African Common Market Protocol of 2010, the free trade and free movement of people is guaranteed, including the right to reside in another member country for purposes of employment. This protocol has not been implemented because of work permit and other bureaucratic, legal, and financial obstacles. Uganda is a founding member of the Intergovernmental Authority on Development (IGAD), an eight-country bloc including governments from the Horn of Africa, Nile Valley, and the African Great Lakes. Its headquarters are in Djibouti City. Uganda is also a member of the Organization of Islamic Cooperation.

In August 2025, Uganda made an agreement with the US to take in asylum seekers deported from the US. Migrants were to be of African origin and had to have no criminal record. Critics including Muwada Nkunyingi have likened this arrangement to human trafficking.

=== Military ===
The Uganda People's Defence Force serves as the military. The number of military personnel in Uganda is estimated at 45,000 soldiers on active duty. The Uganda army is involved in several peacekeeping and combat missions in the region, with commentators noting that only the United States Armed Forces is deployed in more countries. Uganda has soldiers deployed in the northern and eastern areas of the Democratic Republic of the Congo and in the Central African Republic, Somalia, and South Sudan.

=== Corruption ===
Transparency International has rated Uganda's public sector as one of the most corrupt in the world. In 2016, Uganda ranked 151st best out of 176 and had a score of 25 on a scale from 0 (perceived as most corrupt) to 100 (perceived as clean).

The World Bank's 2015 Worldwide Governance Indicators ranked Uganda in the worst 12 percentile of all countries. In the United States Department of State's 2012 Human Rights Report on Uganda, "The World Bank's most recent Worldwide Governance Indicators reflected corruption was a severe problem" and that "the country annually loses 768.9 billion shillings ($286 million) to corruption."

In 2014, Ugandan parliamentarians earned 60 times what was earned by most state employees, and they sought a major increase. This caused widespread criticism and protests, including the smuggling of two piglets into the parliament in June 2014 to highlight corruption amongst members of parliament. The protesters, who were arrested, used the word "MPigs" to highlight their grievance.

A specific scandal, which had significant international consequences and highlighted the presence of corruption in high-level government offices, was the embezzlement of $12.6 million of donor funds from the Office of the Prime Minister in 2012. These funds were "earmarked as crucial support for rebuilding northern Uganda, ravaged by a 20-year war, and Karamoja, Uganda's poorest region." This scandal prompted the EU, the United Kingdom, Germany, Denmark, Ireland, and Norway to suspend aid.

Widespread grand and petty corruption involving public officials and political patronage systems have also seriously affected the investment climate in Uganda. One of the high corruption risk areas is the public procurement in which non-transparent under-the-table cash payments are often demanded from procurement officers.

What may ultimately compound this problem is the availability of oil. The Petroleum Bill, passed by parliament in 2012 and touted by the NRM as bringing transparency to the oil sector, has failed to please domestic and international political commentators and economists. For instance, Angelo Izama, a Ugandan energy analyst at the US-based Open Society Foundation said the new law was tantamount to "handing over an ATM (cash) machine" to Museveni and his regime. According to Global Witness in 2012, a non-governmental organisation devoted to international law, Uganda now has "oil reserves that have the potential to double the government's revenue within six to ten years, worth an estimated US $2.4 billion per year."

The Non-Governmental Organisations (Amendment) Act, passed in 2006, has stifled the productivity of NGOs through erecting barriers to entry, activity, funding and assembly within the sector. Burdensome and corrupt registration procedures (i.e. requiring recommendations from government officials; annual re-registration), unreasonable regulation of operations (i.e. requiring government notification prior to making contact with individuals in NGO's area of interest), and the precondition that all foreign funds be passed through the Bank of Uganda, among other things, are severely limiting the output of the NGO sector.

A leaked confidential document exposes scandals in Uganda's Office of the Prime Minister, including distribution of rotten food, excessive spending, land grabbing allegations, and controversial handling of political matters. These revelations raise questions about the office's ethics and transparency and involves Charles Odongtho, the OPM's public relations expert.

=== Human rights ===
There are many areas which continue to attract concern when it comes to human rights in Uganda.

Conflict in the northern parts of Uganda continues to generate reports of abuses by both the rebel Lord's Resistance Army (LRA), led by Joseph Kony, and the Ugandan Army. A UN official accused the LRA in February 2009 of "appalling brutality" in the Democratic Republic of Congo.

The number of internally displaced persons is estimated at 1.4 million. Torture continues to be a widespread practice amongst security organisations. Child labour is common in Uganda. Many child workers are active in agriculture. Children who work on tobacco farms in Uganda are exposed to health hazards. Child domestic servants in Uganda risk sexual abuse. Trafficking of children occurs. Slavery and forced labour are prohibited by the Ugandan constitution.

In 2007, the US Committee for Refugees and Immigrants reported several violations of refugee rights, including forcible deportations by the Ugandan government and violence directed against refugees.

Torture and extrajudicial killings have been a pervasive problem in Uganda in recent years. For instance, in a 2012 US State Department report, "the African Center for Treatment and Rehabilitation for Torture Victims registered 170 allegations of torture against police, 214 against the UPDF, 1 against military police, 23 against the Special Investigations Unit, 361 against unspecified security personnel, and 24 against prison officials" between January and September 2012.

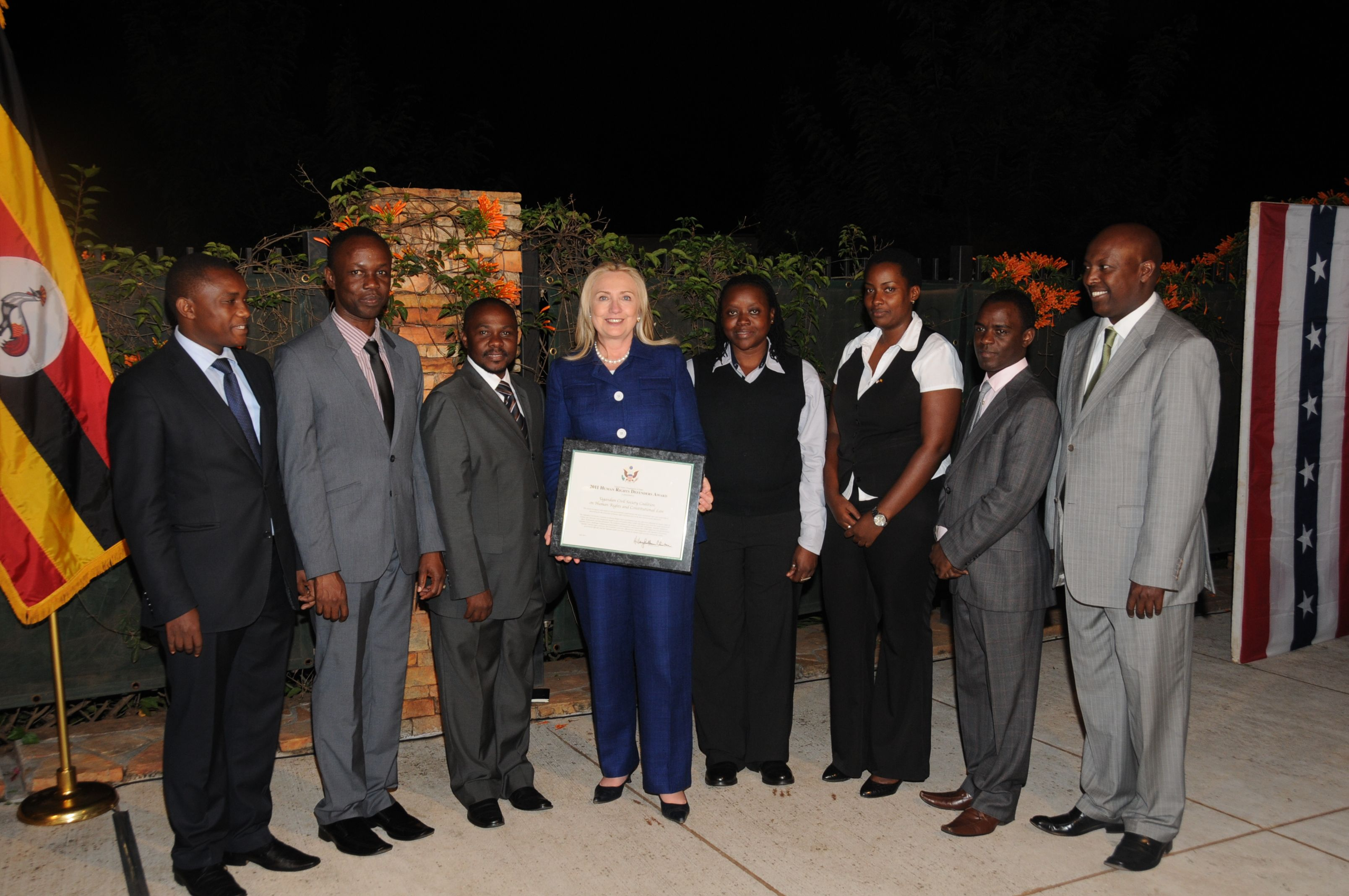
Hillary Rodham Clinton with 2011 Human Rights Defender Award recipients

In September 2009, Museveni refused Kabaka Muwenda Mutebi, the Baganda king, permission to visit some areas of Buganda Kingdom, particularly the Kayunga district. Riots occurred and over 40 people were killed while others still remain imprisoned. 9 more people were killed during the April 2011 "Walk to Work" demonstrations. According to the Humans Rights Watch 2013 World Report on Uganda, the government has failed to investigate the killings associated with both of these events.

==== LGBT rights ====
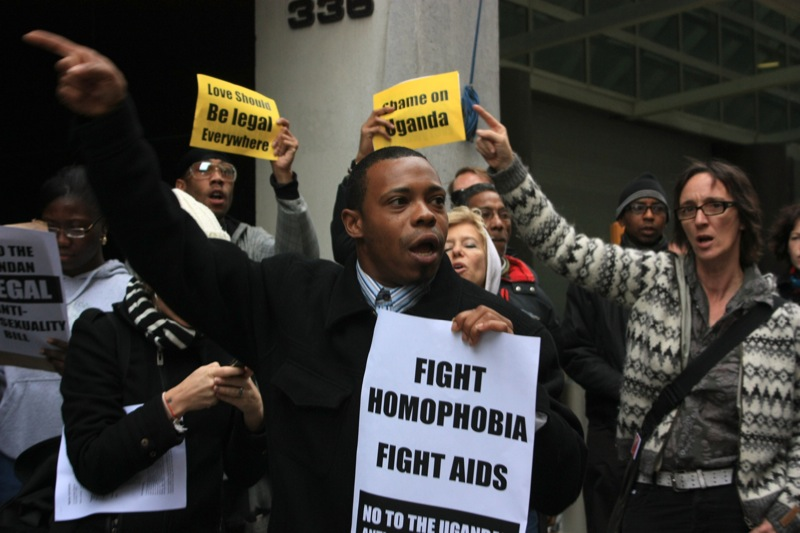
A 2009 protest in New York City against Uganda's first Anti-Homosexuality Bill

In 2007, a newspaper, the Red Pepper, published a list of allegedly gay men; as a result, many of the men listed suffered harassment.

On 9 October 2010, the Ugandan newspaper Rolling Stone published a front-page article titled "100 Pictures of Uganda's Top Homos Leak" that listed the names, addresses, and photographs of 100 homosexuals alongside a yellow banner that read "Hang Them." The paper also alleged homosexual recruitment of Ugandan children. The publication attracted international attention and criticism from human rights organisations, such as Amnesty International, No Peace Without Justice and the International Lesbian, Gay, Bisexual, Trans and Intersex Association. According to gay rights activists, many Ugandans have been attacked since the publication. On 27 January 2011, gay rights activist David Kato was murdered.

In 2009, the Ugandan parliament considered an Anti-Homosexuality Bill which would have broadened the criminalisation of homosexuality by introducing the death penalty for people who have previous convictions, or are HIV-positive, and engage in same-sex sexual acts. The bill included provisions for Ugandans who engage in same-sex sexual relations outside of Uganda, asserting that they may be extradited back to Uganda for punishment, and included penalties for individuals, companies, media organisations, or non-governmental organisations that support legal protection for homosexuality or sodomy. On 14 October 2009, MP David Bahati submitted the private member's bill and was believed to have had widespread support in the Uganda parliament.

The hacktivist group Anonymous hacked into Ugandan government websites in protest of the bill. In response to global condemnation the debate of the bill was delayed, but it was eventually passed on 20 December 2013 and President Museveni signed it on 24 February 2014. The death penalty was dropped in the final legislation. The law was widely condemned by the international community. Denmark, the Netherlands, and Sweden said they would withhold aid. On 28 February 2014, the World Bank said it would postpone a US$90 million loan, while the United States said it was reviewing ties with Uganda.

On 1 August 2014, the Constitutional Court of Uganda ruled the bill invalid as it was not passed with the required quorum. A 13 August 2014 news report said that the Ugandan attorney general had dropped all plans to appeal, per a directive from President Museveni who was concerned about foreign reaction to the bill and who also said that any newly introduced bill should not criminalise same-sex relationships between consenting adults. As of 2019, adoption of LGBT rights on the African continent was slow but progressing with South Africa being the only country where same sex marriages are recognised.

===== Anti-Homosexuality Act, 2023 =====
On 9 March 2023, Asuman Basalirwa (a member of parliament since 2018 from the opposition representing Bugiri Municipality on Justice Forum party ticket) tabled a proposed law which sought to castigate gay sex and "the promotion or recognition of such relations" and he made remarks that, "In this country, or in this world, we talk about human rights. But it is also true that there are human wrongs. I want to submit that homosexuality is a human wrong that offends the laws of Uganda and threatens the sanctity of the family, the safety of our children and the continuation of humanity through reproduction."

The speaker of parliament, Annet Anita Among, referred the bill to a house committee for scrutiny, the first step in an accelerated process to pass the proposal into law. The parliament speaker had earlier noted that: "We want to appreciate our promoters of homosexuality for the social economic development they have brought to the country," in reference to western countries and donors. "But we do not appreciate the fact that they are killing morals. We do not need their money, we need our culture." - during a prayer service held in parliament and attended by several religious leaders. The Speaker vowed to pass the bill into law at whatever cost to shield Uganda's culture and its sovereignty.

On 21 March 2023, the Ugandan parliament approved a bill that would have made identifying as homosexual punishable by 20 year in prison and "aggravated homosexuality" by the death penalty. The bill was not approved by the President and, in the revised version which became law, identifying as homosexual was not a crime.

The United States strongly condemned the bill. During a White House Press briefing on 22 March 2023, Karine Jean-Pierre stated. "Human rights are universal. No one should be attacked, imprisoned, or killed simply because of who they are or whom they love." Further criticism came from the United Kingdom, Canada, Germany, and the European Union.

=== Refugee policy ===
Uganda's approach to hosting refugees is among the most progressive globally. Despite limited international support, the country maintains an open door policy that is anchored in national law. Refugees have access to essential services, may apply for work permits and move freely within the country. They are allotted a plot of land and may live in settlements that are closely integrated with surrounding Ugandan communities. They are also allowed to form associations and civil society groups. In this setting, many organisations created and run by refugees have developed, providing a range of support to their communities. These groups nonetheless face challenges such as scarce funding, barriers to registration and limited influence over decisions. The refugee policy does not provide a path to Ugandan citizenship.

Uganda has a long history of receiving displaced people. The country hosted refugees even before its independence in 1962, including groups fleeing World War II and later people escaping violence in Rwanda and southern Sudan. Uganda also experienced periods when large numbers of its own citizens were displaced, particularly during the 1970s and 1980s and during the insurgency by the Lord's Resistance Army. Regional conflicts throughout the 1990s and 2000s, including the Rwandan genocide, Sudanese civil war and the Congolese wars, continued to drive people into Uganda. By 2014, Uganda sheltered roughly 400,000 displaced people.

By October 2025, Uganda hosted roughly 1.95 million refugees, more than any other country in Africa. Most are rural groups mainly from South Sudan and the Democratic Republic of the Congo, as well as from Somalia, Burundi, and Rwanda. From 2023, more than 90,000 refugees fleeing the civil war in Sudan have entered.

=== Administrative divisions ===
Map of the 17 officially recognised Kingdoms within Uganda. Areas without recognised Kingdoms in white

Uganda is divided into four Regions of Uganda and 136 districts. Rural areas of districts are subdivided into sub-counties, parishes, and villages. Municipal and town councils are designated in urban areas of districts.

Political subdivisions in Uganda are officially served and united by the Uganda Local Governments Association (ULGA), a voluntary and non-profit body which also serves as a forum for support and guidance for Ugandan sub-national governments.

Parallel with the state administration, seventeen traditional kingdoms exist with official state recognition, enjoying some degrees of mainly cultural autonomy. The oldest and most prestigious of the kingdoms are Buganda, Busoga, Bunyoro, Tooro and Rwenzururu. Some groups attempt to restore Ankole as one of the officially recognised traditional kingdoms, to no avail yet. Several other kingdoms and chiefdoms are officially recognised by the government, including the Alur Kingdom, the Iteso paramount chieftaincy, the Lango monarchy and the Padhola state.

== Economy and infrastructure ==
The Bank of Uganda is the central bank of Uganda and handles monetary policy along with the printing of the Ugandan shilling.

In 2015, Uganda's economy generated export income from the following merchandise: coffee (US$402.63 million), oil re-exports (US$131.25 million), base metals and products (US$120.00 million), fish (US$117.56 million), maize (US$90.97 million), cement (US$80.13 million), tobacco (US$73.13 million), tea (US$69.94 million), sugar (US$66.43 million), hides and skins (US$62.71 million), cocoa beans (US$55.67 million), beans (US$53.88 million), simsim (US$52.20 million), flowers (US$51.44 million), and other products (US$766.77 million).

Change in per capita GDP of Uganda, 1950–2018. Figures are inflation-adjusted to 2011 International dollars.

Uganda has been experiencing consistent economic growth. In fiscal year 2015–16, Uganda recorded gross domestic product growth of 4.6 per cent in real terms and 11.6 per cent in nominal terms. This compares to 5.0 per cent real growth in fiscal year 2014–15.

Uganda has largely untapped reserves of both crude oil and natural gas. While agriculture accounted for 56 per cent of the economy in 1986, with coffee as its main export, it has now been surpassed by the services sector, which accounted for 52 per cent of GDP in 2007. In the 1950s, the British colonial regime encouraged some 500,000 subsistence farmers to join co-operatives. Since 1986, the government, with the support of foreign countries and international agencies, has acted to rehabilitate an economy devastated during the regime of Idi Amin and the subsequent civil war.

In 2012, the World Bank listed Uganda on the Heavily Indebted Poor Countries list.

Economic growth has not always led to poverty reduction. Despite an average annual growth of 2.5 per cent between 2000 and 2003, poverty levels increased by 3.8 per cent during that time. This has highlighted the importance of avoiding jobless growth and is part of the rising awareness in development circles of the need for equitable growth not just in Uganda, but across the developing world.

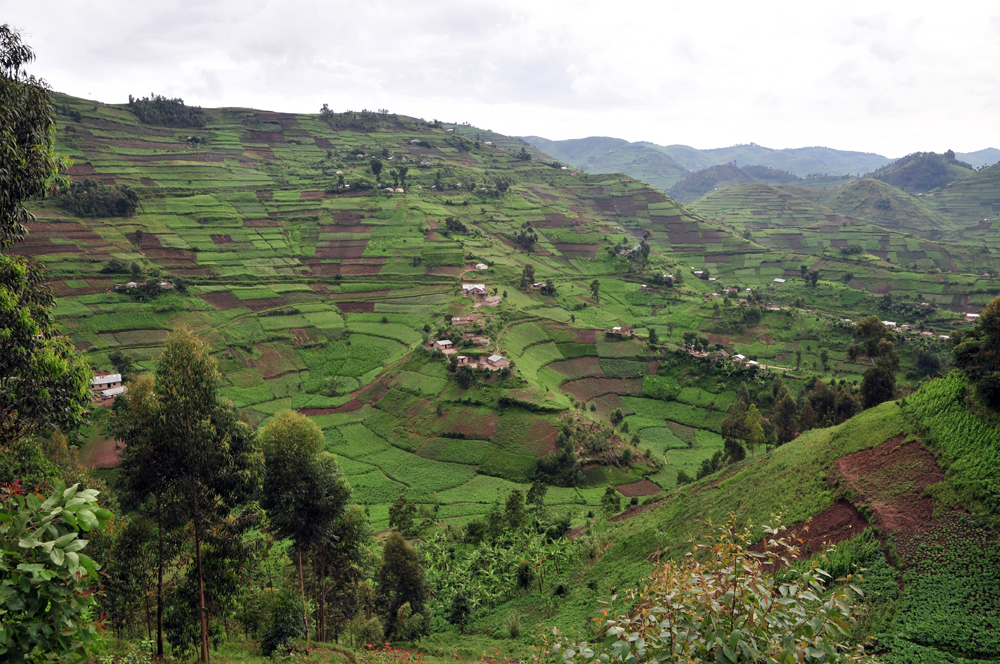
Coffee fields in southwestern Uganda

With the Uganda securities exchanges established in 1996, several equities have been listed. The government has used the stock market as an avenue for privatisation. All government treasury issues are listed on the securities exchange. The Capital Markets Authority has licensed 18 brokers, asset managers, and investment advisors including: African Alliance Investment Bank, Baroda Capital Markets Uganda Limited, Crane Financial Services Uganda Limited, Crested Stocks and Securities Limited, Dyer & Blair Investment Bank, Equity Stock Brokers Uganda Limited, Renaissance Capital Investment Bank and UAP Financial Services Limited. As one of the ways of increasing formal domestic savings, pension sector reform is the centre of attention (2007).

Uganda traditionally depends on Kenya for access to the Indian Ocean port of Mombasa. Efforts have intensified to establish a second access route to the sea via the lakeside ports of Bukasa in Uganda and Musoma in Tanzania, connected by railway to Arusha in the Tanzanian interior and to the port of Tanga on the Indian Ocean. Uganda is a member of the East African Community and a potential member of the planned East African Federation.

Uganda has a large diaspora, living mainly in the United States and the United Kingdom. This diaspora has contributed enormously to Uganda's economic growth through remittances and other investments, especially property. In 2016, Uganda received an estimated US$1.099 billion in remittances from abroad, second only to Kenya (US$1.574 billion) in the East African Community, and seventh in Africa. Uganda also serves as an economic hub for a number of neighbouring countries like the Democratic Republic of the Congo, South Sudan, and Rwanda.

Roads in Uganda

Inflation was 4.6 per cent in November 2016. In June 2018, inflation dropped to 3.4 per cent in the financial year ending 2017/18 compared to 5.7 per cent 2016/17.

=== Industry ===
In 2019, Uganda ranked as number 102 among the countries of the world in nominal Gross Domestic Product by the International Monetary Fund with a GDP of 26,349 (US$million). In 2022, the World Bank ranked Uganda as number 99 in nominal GDP with a GDP of 25,891 (US$million). In 2019, based on the GDP with purchasing power parity the IMF ranked Uganda as number 86 (91,212 million of current Int$). In 2022, the World Bank ranked them 90 (79,889 million of current Int$).

Since the 1990s, the economy in Uganda has grown. Real gross domestic product (GDP) grew at an average of 6.7% annually during the period 1990–2015. Real GDP per capita grew at 3.3% per annum during the same period.

=== Poverty ===
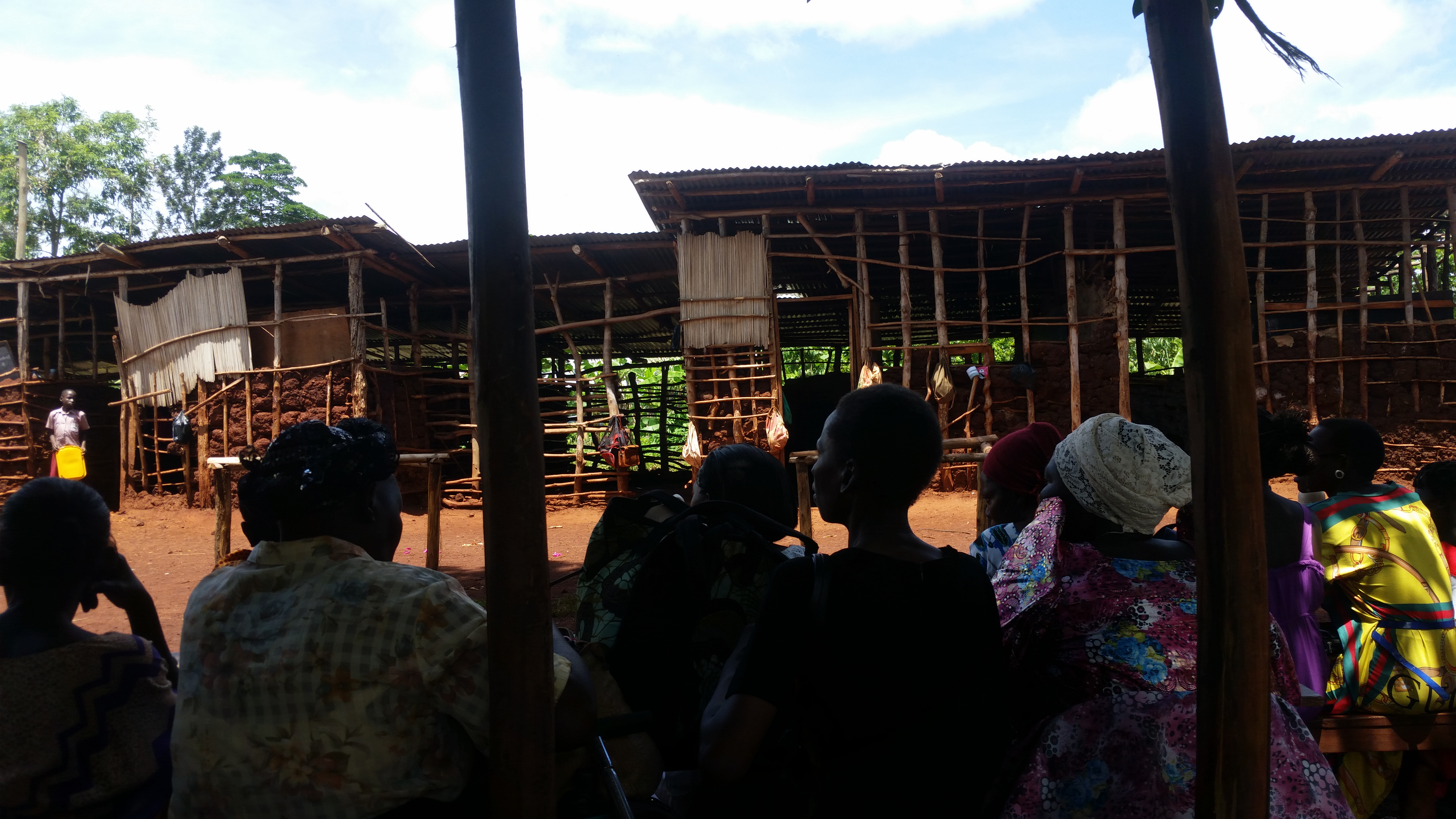
A school on the Nile River

Uganda is one of the poorest nations in the world. In 2012, 37.8 per cent of the population lived on less than $1.25 a day. Despite making enormous progress in reducing the countrywide poverty incidence from 56 per cent of the population in 1992 to 24.5 per cent in 2009, poverty remains deep-rooted in the country's rural areas, which are home to 84 per cent of Ugandans.

People in rural areas of Uganda depend on farming as the main source of income and 90 per cent of all rural women work in the agricultural sector. In addition to agricultural work, rural women are responsible for the caretaking of their families. The average Ugandan woman spends 9 hours a day on domestic tasks, such as preparing food and clothing, fetching water and firewood, and caring for the elderly, the sick as well as orphans.

Women on average work longer hours than men, between 12 and 18 hours per day, with a mean of 15 hours, as compared to men, who work between 8 and 10 hours a day, although urban men and women work very similar hours. In 2005, 26% of households were headed by women only (FHH), up from previous years as a result of death of men from AIDS. There were most FHHs in the top quintile, by income, (31%). Male only headed households in poverty were also increased to a similar level as FHH, though little research had been done.

To supplement their income, rural women may engage in small-scale entrepreneurial activities such as rearing and selling local breeds of animals. Nonetheless, because of their heavy workload, they have little time for these income-generating activities. The poor cannot support their children at school and in most cases, girls drop out of school to help out in domestic work or to get married. Other girls engage in sex work. As a result, young women tend to have older and more sexually experienced partners and this puts women at a disproportionate risk of getting affected by HIV, accounting for about 5.7 per cent of all adults living with HIV in Uganda.

Maternal health in rural Uganda lags behind national policy targets and the Millennium Development Goals, with geographical inaccessibility, lack of transport and financial burdens identified as key demand-side constraints to accessing maternal health services; as such, interventions like intermediate transport mechanisms have been adopted as a means to improve women's access to maternal health care services in rural regions of the country.

Gender inequality is the main hindrance to reducing women's poverty. Women are subjected to an overall lower social status than men. Many women believe this reduces their power to act independently, participate in community life, become educated and escape reliance upon abusive men.

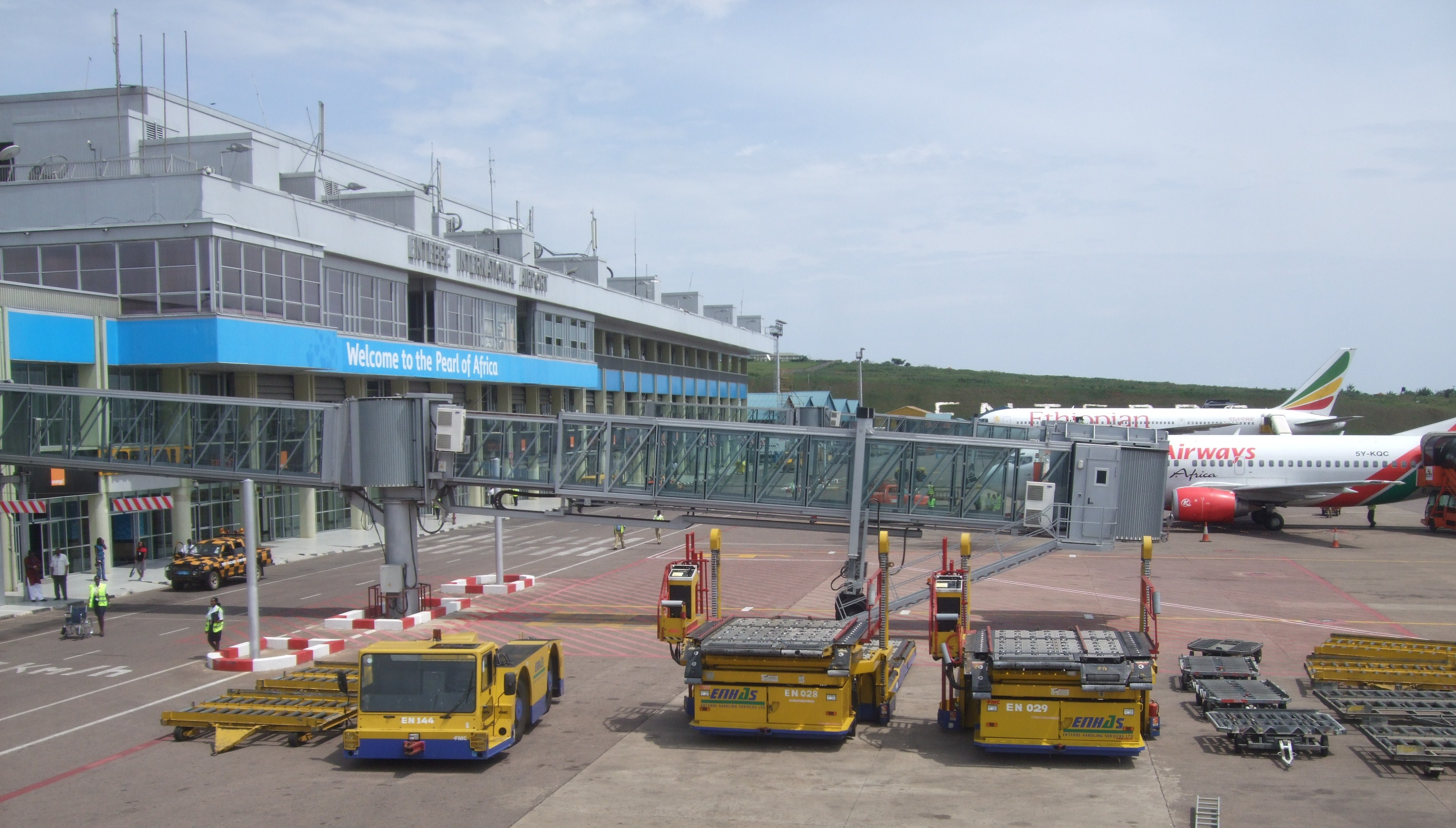
Entebbe International Airport

=== Air transportation ===
There are 36 airports in Uganda. Commercial airlines operate scheduled passenger services out of four airports. Uganda currently has one functioning international airport, Entebbe International Airport, which is located 25 miles (40 km) south-west of Kampala. In 2017, the airport traffic was 1.53 million passengers, 8% more than the previous year. A second international airport, Kabalega International Airport, is currently under construction. It received its first passenger aircraft on 27 September 2026, carrying government officials and football teams, marking a step toward regular passenger operations.

=== Road network ===
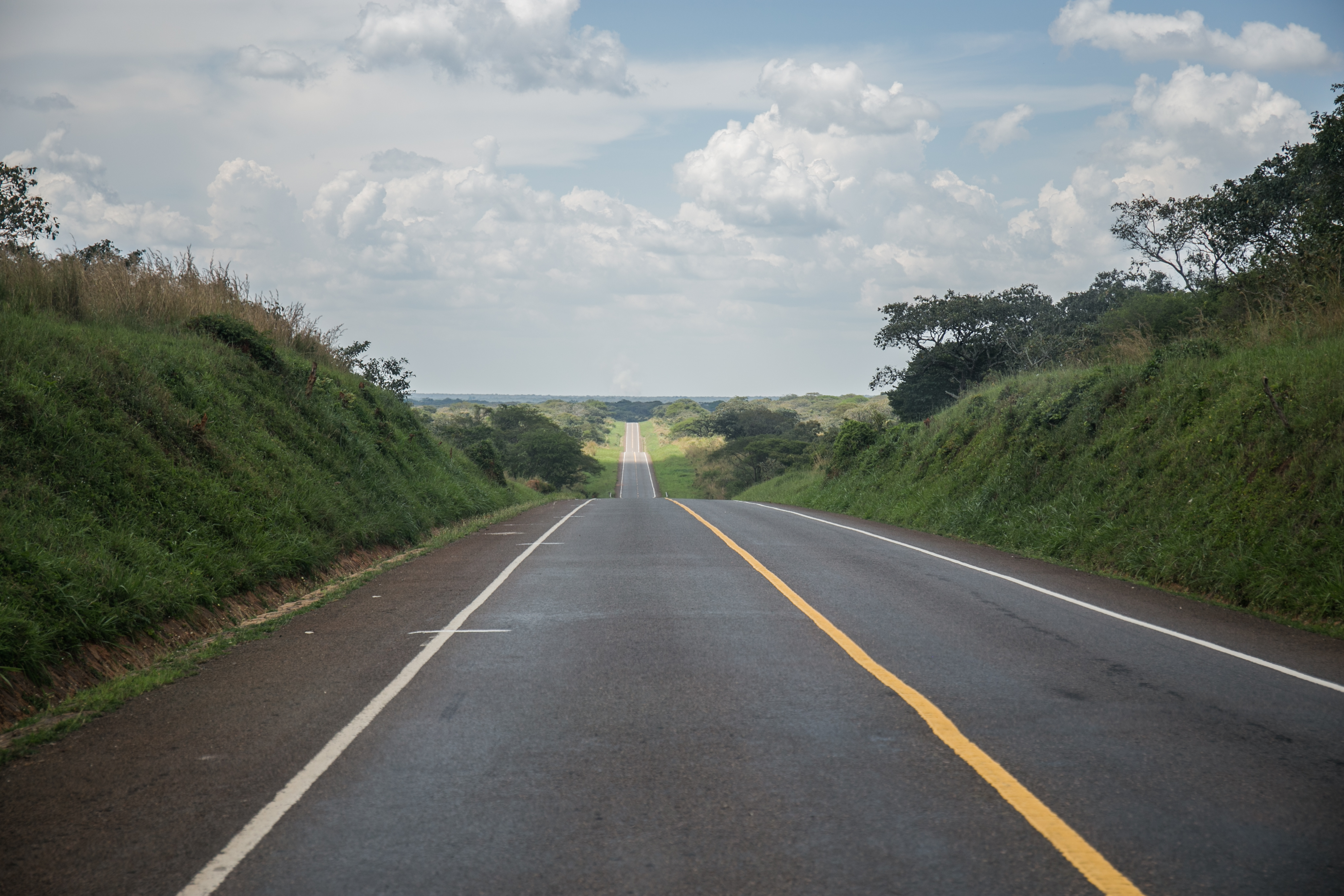
The road to Murchison

Roads are the main method of transportation in Uganda. 95% of freight and passenger traffic is handled by road traffic. The road network in Uganda is approximately 129,469 km (80,448 mi) long. About 4% of these roads are paved, which equates to only about 5,300 kilometres (3,300 mi) of paved road. The different types of roads are national roads (22,009 km (13,676 mi)—17%), district roads (33,661 km (20,916 mi)—26%), urban roads (9,062 km (5,631 mi)—7%), and community roads (64,734 km (40,224 mi)—50%).

The national roads make up about 17% of the road network but carry over 80% of the total road traffic. In 2022, there were 83,000 private cars, which equates to 2.94 cars per 1,000 inhabitants.

=== Railways ===
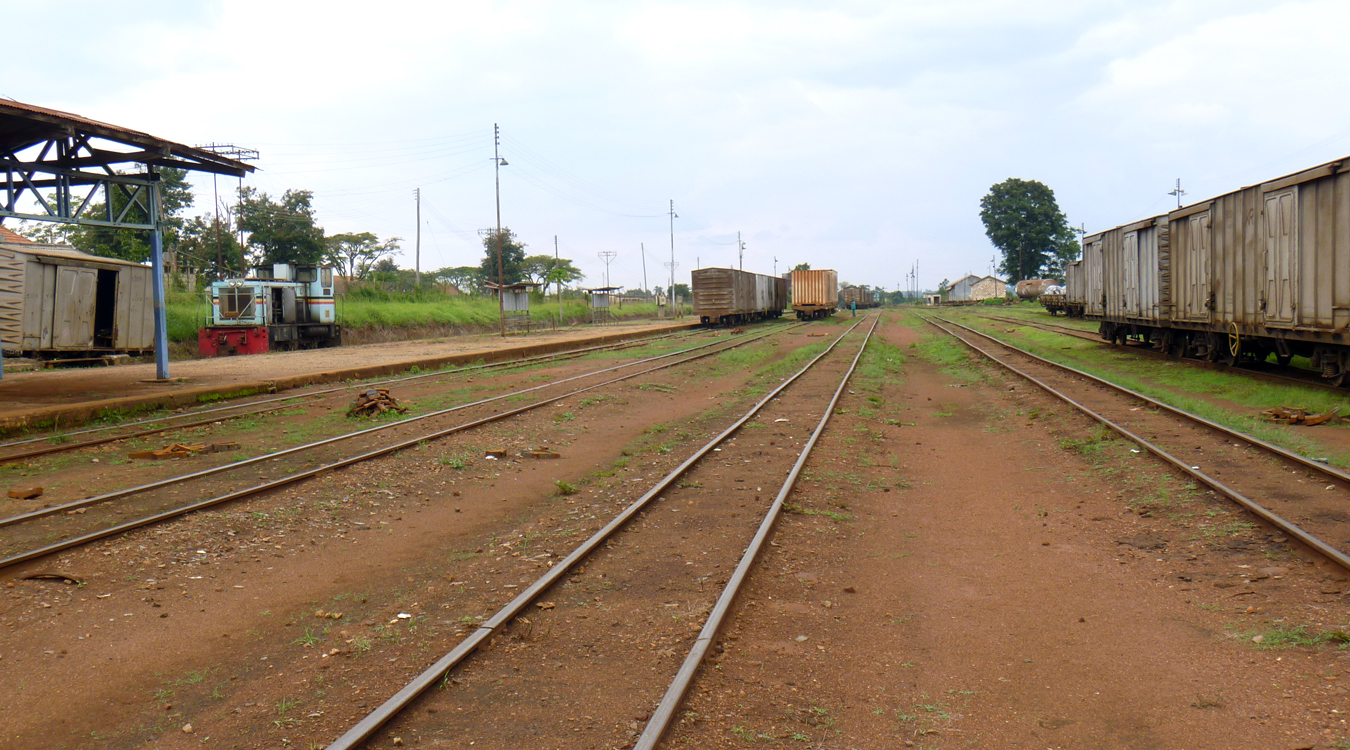
Uganda Railway

The rail network in Uganda is approximately 1,260 kilometres (780 mi) long. The longest lines are the main line from Kampala to Tororo (249 kilometres (155 mi)), the western line from Kampala to Kasese (333 kilometres (207 mi)), the northern line from Tororo to Pakwach (641 kilometres (398 mi)).

=== Communications ===
There are several systems of communication, including telephony, radio and television broadcasts, internet, mail, and newspapers. The use of phones and the internet has rapidly increased.

There are seven telecommunications companies. In 2018 there were over 24 million subscribers in a population of 48 million. More than 95% of internet connections are made using mobile phones.

=== Energy ===
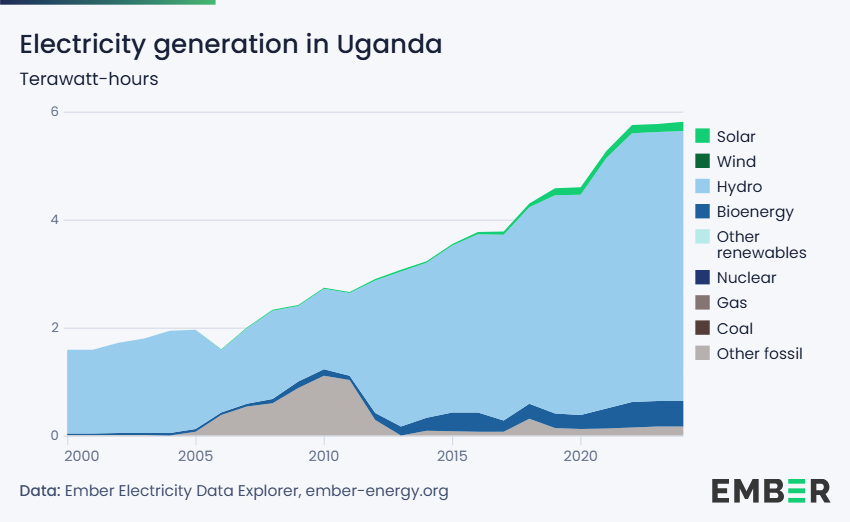
Electricity generation in Uganda by source in terawatt-hours

Uganda has abundant energy resources, which are fairly distributed throughout the country. These include hydropower, biomass, solar, geothermal, peat and fossil fuels.

In the 1980s, the majority of energy in Uganda came from charcoal and wood. Oil was found in the Lake Albert area, totalling an estimated 95 million cubic metres (3.4×10^{9} cu ft) of crude. Heritage Oil discovered one of the largest crude oil finds in Uganda, and continues operations there.

Uganda and Tanzania signed a deal in September 2016 for the two countries build a 1,445 km, $3.5bn crude oil pipeline. The Uganda–Tanzania Crude Oil Pipeline (UTCOP), also known as the East African Crude Oil Pipeline (EACOP), will be the first of its kind in East Africa, will connect Uganda's oil-rich Hoima region with the Indian Ocean through the Tanga port in Tanzania.

Uganda's favourable enabling environment and broad presence of private sector investment presents a unique opportunity to deliver on Power Africa goals. Uganda is one of the few sub-Saharan African countries to have liberalised and financially viable energy markets, with generation, transmission and supply segments unbundled since 2001. There is an independent Electricity Regulatory Authority that undertakes sector regulation and oversight. The largest distribution company, UMEME is privately owned and has a 20-year concession for distribution and retail. Uganda is divided into 13 rural service territories, and 6 of these are managed by small distribution companies. Independent power producers (IPPs) currently account for nearly 60% of generation capacity. Issues with integrated planning and the financial ecosystem persist.

=== Water supply and sanitation ===
According to a 2006 report, the Ugandan water supply and sanitation sector had made substantial progress in urban areas since the mid-1990s, with substantial increases in coverage as well as in operational and commercial performance. Sector reforms in the period 1998–2003 included the commercialisation and modernisation of the National Water and Sewerage Corporation operating in cities and larger towns, and decentralisation and private sector participation in small towns.

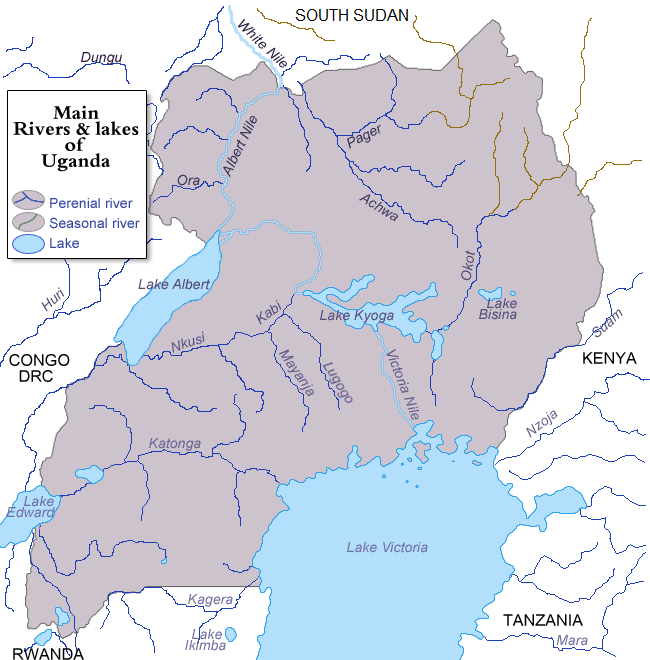
Main Rivers and Lakes of Uganda

Although these reforms have attracted significant international attention, 38 per cent of the population still had no access to an improved water source in 2010. Concerning access to improved sanitation, figures have varied widely. According to government figures, it was 70 per cent in rural areas and 81 per cent in urban areas in 2011. According to UN figures, it was only 34 per cent.

The water and sanitation sector was recognised as a key area under the 2004 Poverty Eradication Action Plan (PEAP), Uganda's main strategy paper to fight poverty. In a 2006 report, a comprehensive expenditure framework had been introduced to co-ordinate financial support by external donors, the national government, and nongovernmental organisations. The PEAP estimated that from 2001 to 2015, about US$1.4 billion, or US$92 million per year, was needed to increase water supply coverage up to 95 per cent, with rural areas needing US$956 million, urban areas and large towns needing US$281 million, and small towns needing US$136 million.

=== Education ===
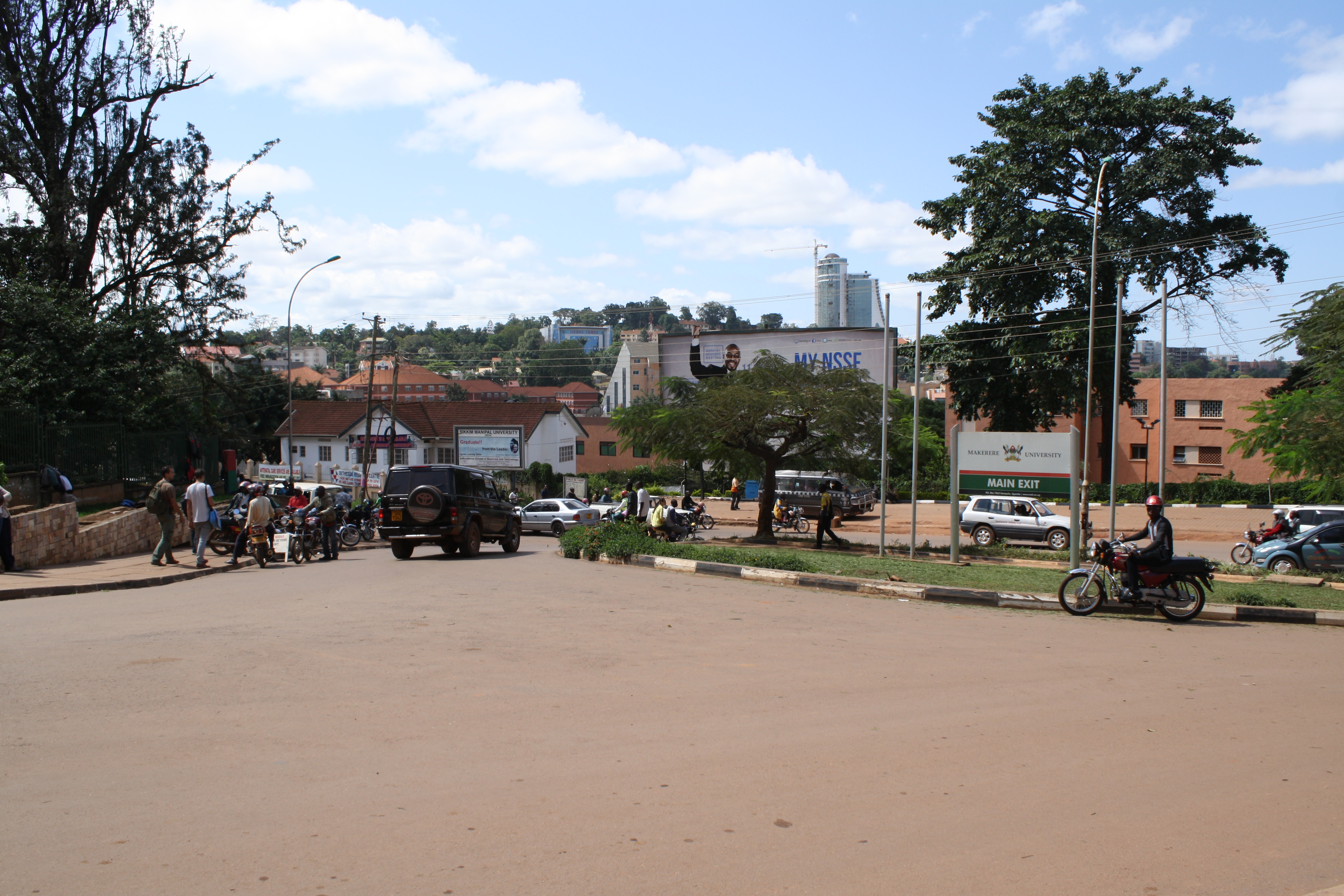
Makerere university Campus Entrance

Uganda's educational system, while lacking in many areas, has seen significant change since the late 1990s. Children spend seven years in primary school, six years in secondary school, and three to five years in post secondary school. In 1997, the government declared that primary school would be free for all children. This amendment has had huge benefits. In 1986, only two million children were attending primary school. By 1999, six million children were attending primary school, and this number has continued to climb.

In 2007, following significant gains in access to primary education since 1997 when universal primary education (UPE) was introduced, Uganda became the first country in sub-Saharan Africa to introduce universal secondary education (USE). This led to an increase in lower secondary enrolment of nearly 25% between 2007 and 2012.

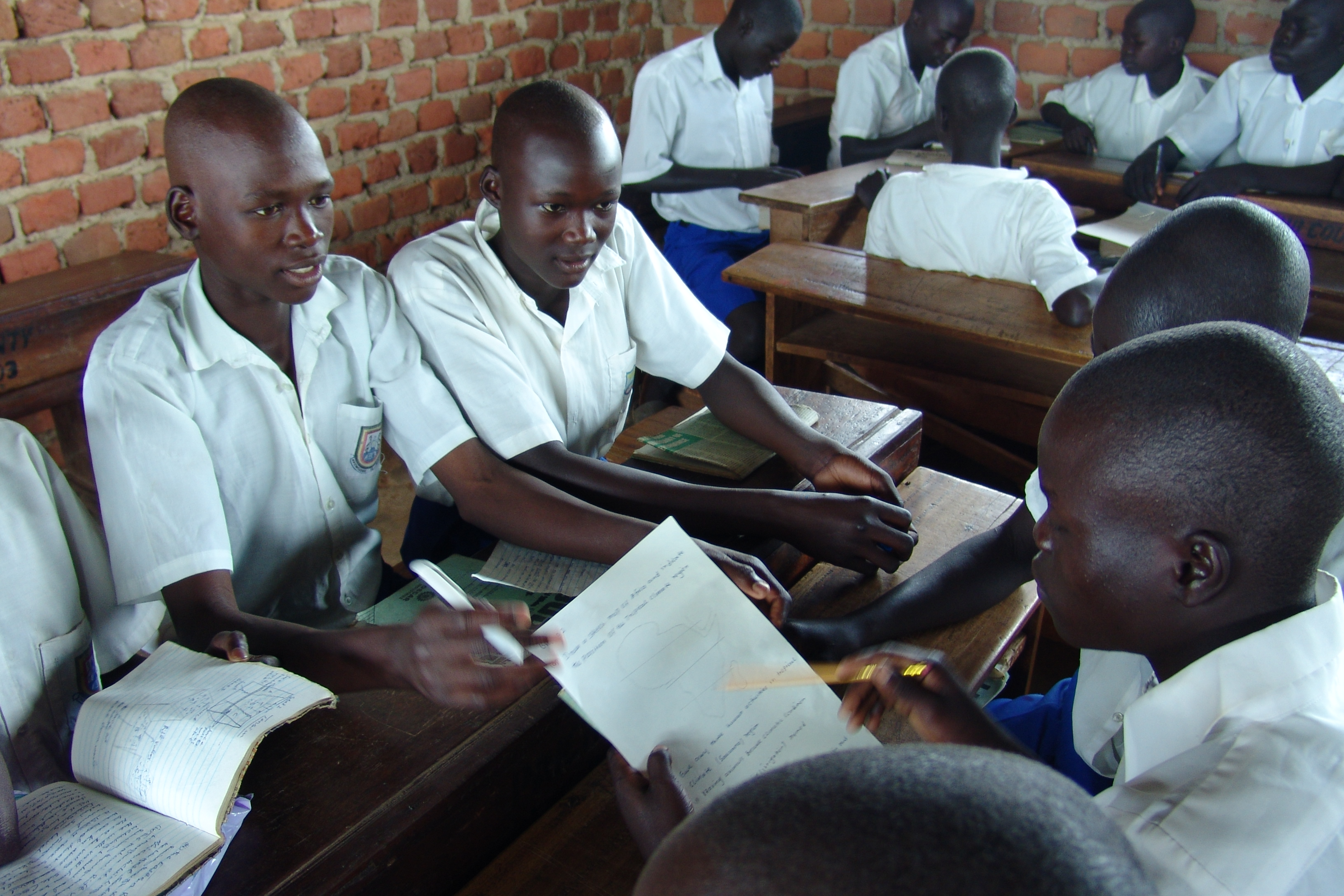
Students in Uganda

At the 2002 census, Uganda had a literacy rate of 66.8 per cent, with 76.8 per cent male and 57.7 per cent female literacy. Public spending on education was 5.2 per cent between 2002–2005 GDP.

As of 2020, the NCHE website listed 46 private accredited universities, including Makerere University, Mbarara University of science and technology, Kyambogo University, Gulu University, Uganda Christian University, Kampala international University.

=== Health ===
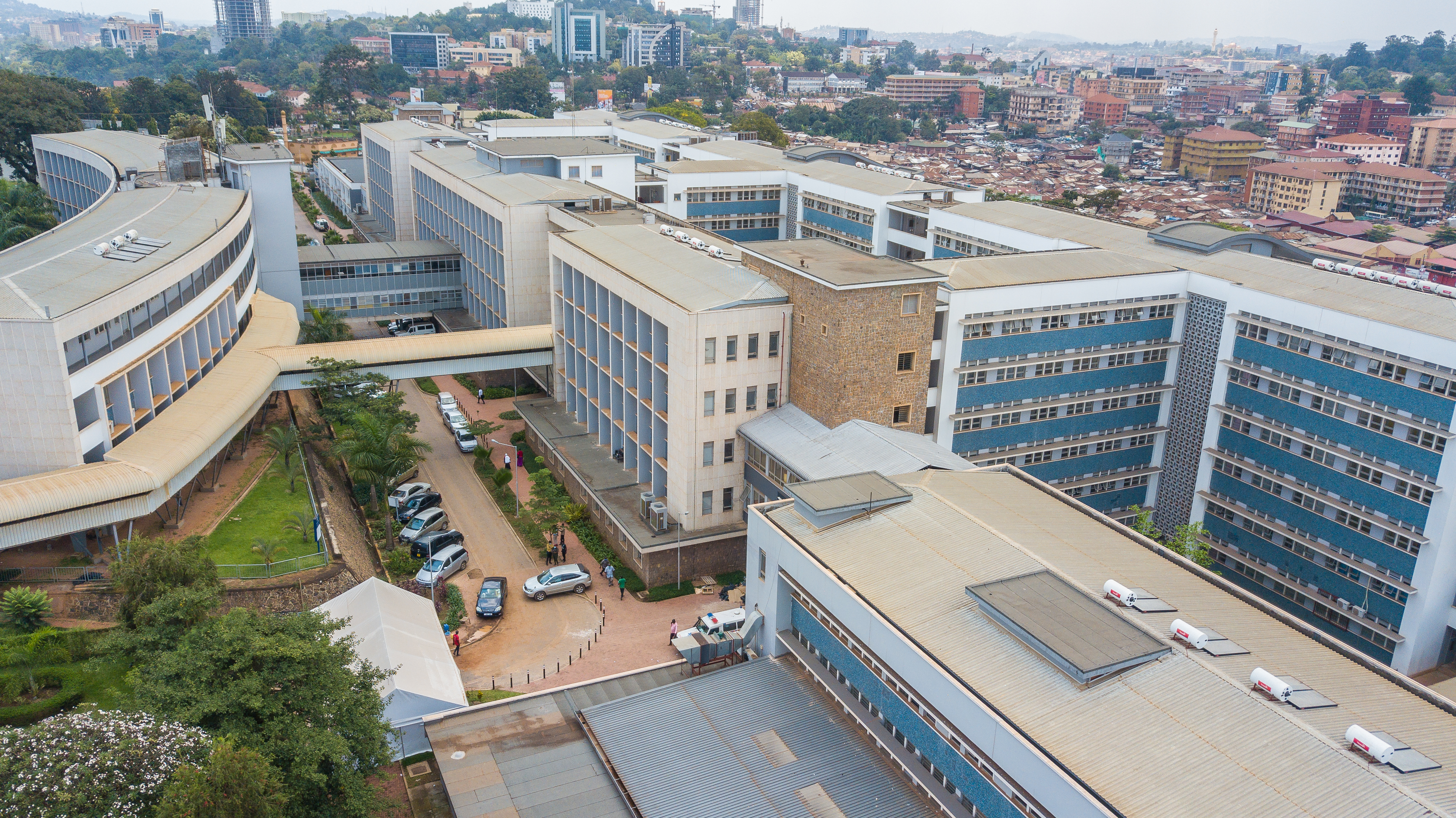
Mulago National Referral Hospital

There were eight physicians per 100,000 persons in the early 2000s. Uganda's elimination of user fees at state health facilities in 2001 has resulted in an 80 per cent increase in visits, with over half of this increase coming from the poorest 20 per cent of the population. This policy has been cited as a key factor in helping Uganda achieve its Millennium Development Goals and as an example of the importance of equity in achieving those goals. Despite this policy, many users are denied care if they do not provide their own medical equipment, as happened in the highly publicised case of Jennifer Anguko. Poor communication within hospitals, low satisfaction with health services and distance to health service providers undermine the provision of quality health care to people living in Uganda, and particularly for those in poor and elderly-headed households. The provision of subsidies for poor and rural populations, along with the extension of public private partnerships, have been identified as important provisions to enable vulnerable populations to access health services.

The life expectancy of Uganda has increased from 39.3 in 1950 to 62.7 years in 2021. This is lower than the world average which is at 71.0 years. The fertility rate of Ugandan women slightly increased from an average of 6.89 babies per woman in the 1950s to about 7.12 in the 1970s before declining to an estimated 4.3 babies in 2019. This figure is higher than the world average of 2 and most world regions including South East Asia, Middle East and North Africa, Europe and Central Asia and America. The under-5-mortality-rate for Uganda has decreased from 191 deaths per 1000 live births in 1970 to 41 deaths per 1000 live births in 2022.

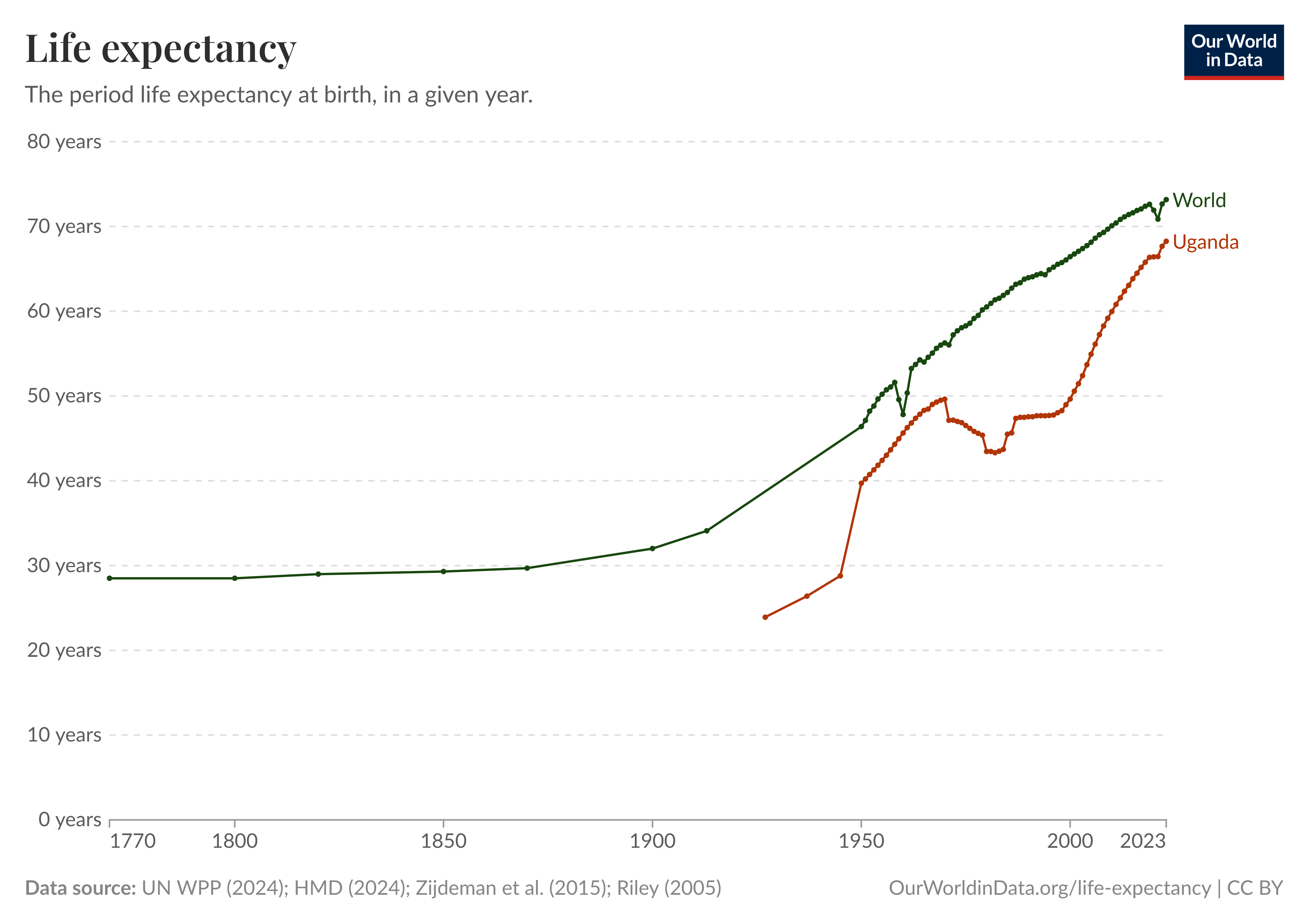
Life expectancy of Uganda as per 2021

Uganda has been among the rare HIV success stories. Infection rates of 30 per cent of the population in the 1980s fell to 6.4 per cent by the end of 2008. Meanwhile, the practice of abstinence was found to have decreased.

Less than half of all sexually active unmarried women use a modern contraceptive method, a fraction that has barely changed from 2000 to 2011. However, only ≈26% of married women used contraceptives in 2011. The use of contraceptives also differs substantially between poor (≈15%) and wealthy women (≈40%). As a result, Ugandan women have ≈6 children while they prefer to have around ≈4. According to the 2011 Uganda Demographic and Health Survey (DHS), more than 40% of births are unplanned. In 2010, the Ugandan Ministry of Health estimated that unsafe abortion accounted for 8% of the country's maternal deaths. The 2006 Uganda Demographic Health Survey (UDHS) indicated that roughly 6,000 women die each year from pregnancy-related complications. Pilot studies in 2012 by Future Health Systems have shown that this rate could be significantly reduced by implementing a voucher scheme for health services and transport to clinics.

The prevalence of female genital mutilation (FGM) is low: according to a 2013 UNICEF report, only 1 per cent of women in Uganda have undergone FGM, with the practice being illegal in the country.

Uganda's first confirmed Ebola outbreak occurred in 2000. Since then, Uganda has experienced several additional outbreaks, the latest in May 2026. Uganda's Ebola response has included isolation, contact tracing, infection control, public communication and, in some outbreaks, vaccine trials, while outbreaks have also been associated with stigma against survivors and health workers.

The Human Rights Measurement Initiative found that Uganda is fulfilling 80.0% of what it should be fulfilling for the right to health based on its level of income. Total health expenditure as a percentage of gross domestic product (GDP) was 4.67% in 2021.

=== Crime and law enforcement ===
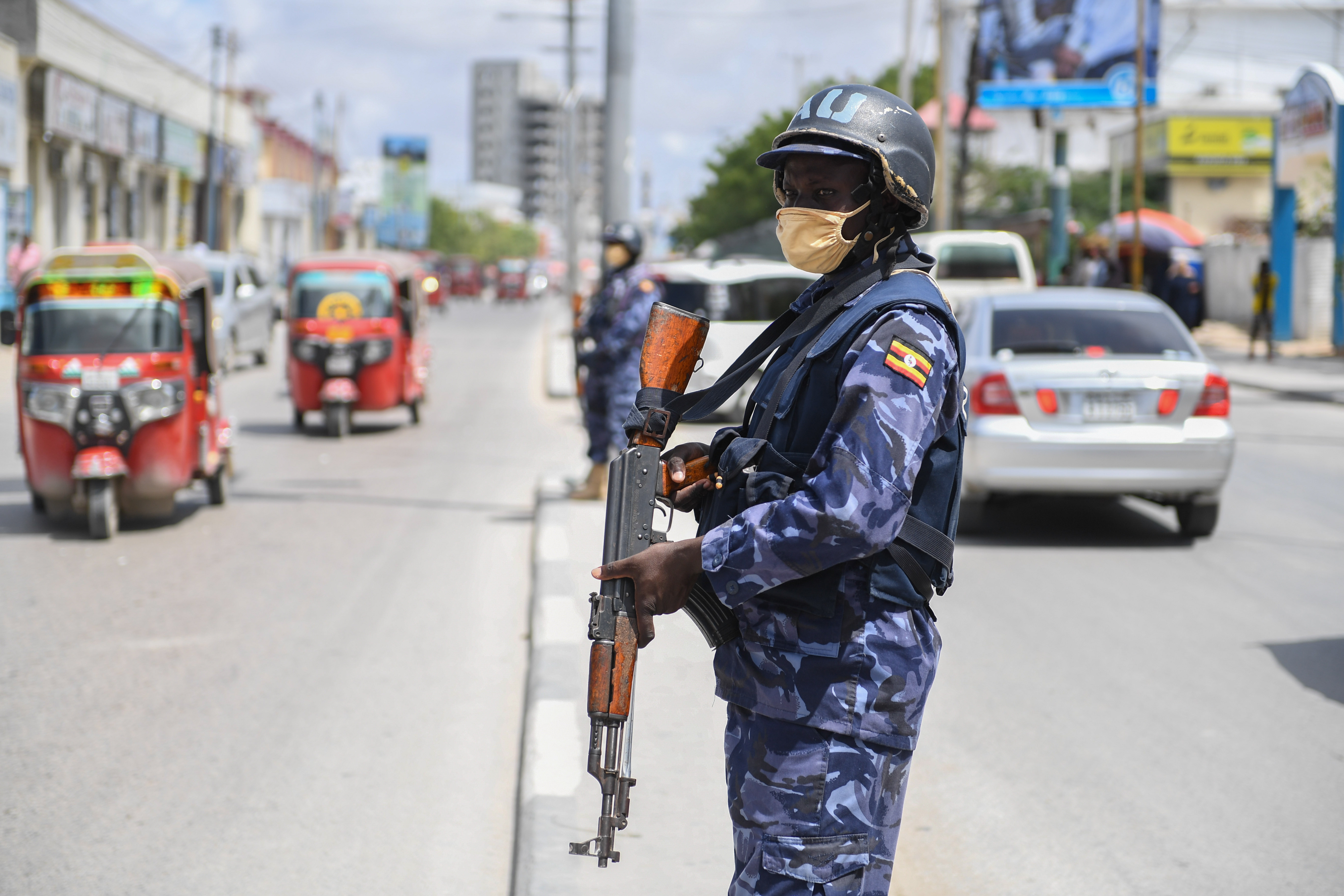
Ugandan police officers in Mogadishu, Somalia

The Uganda Police Force is the national police force. Its head is called the Inspector General of Police (IGP), currently Abbas Byakagaba. Byakagaba replaced former IGP, Geoffrey Tumusiime on 18 May 2024. Recruitment to the forces is done annually.

The Allied Democratic Forces is a violent rebel force that opposes the Ugandan government. These rebels are an enemy of the Uganda People's Defence Force and an affiliate of Al-Shabaab.

=== Tourism ===
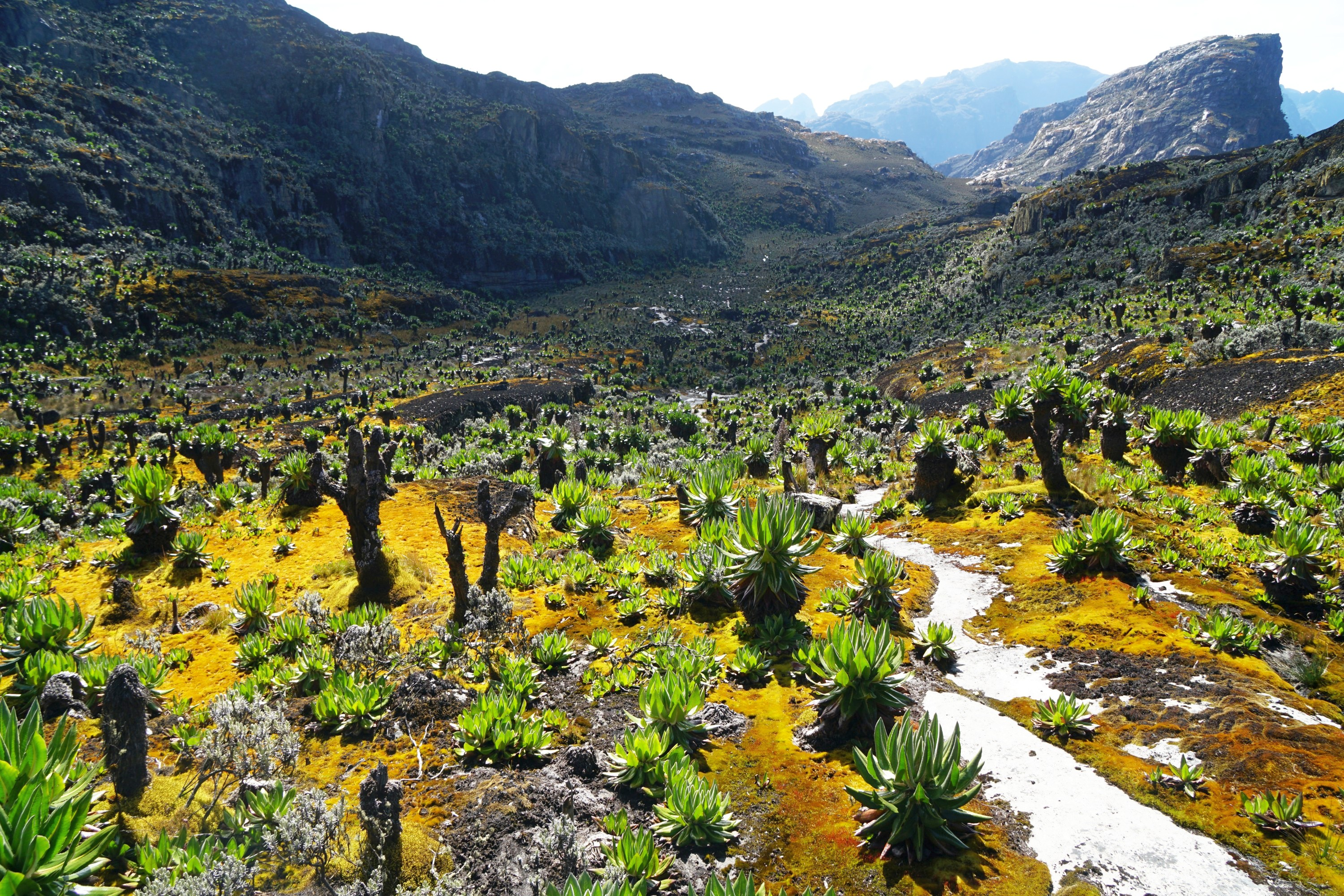
Rwenzori mountains in Uganda

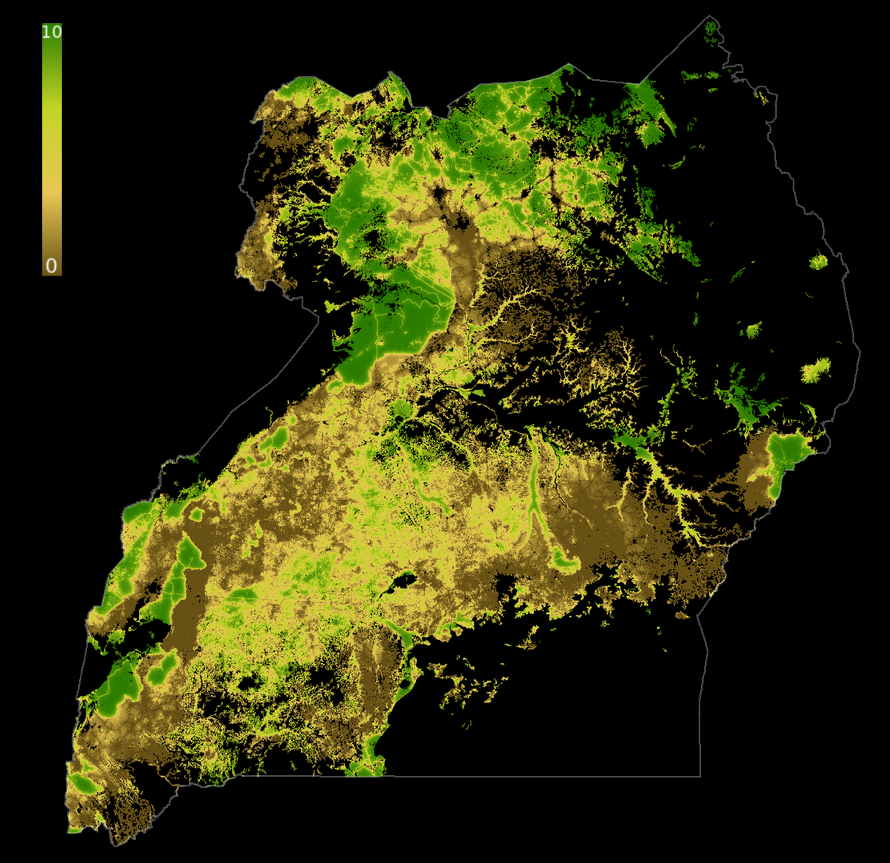
Forest Landscape Integrity Index 2019 map of Uganda. Forest condition measured by degree of anthropogenic modification. 0 = most modifications; 10 = least. Created in Google Earth Engine. National boundaries = LSIB 2017: Large Scale International Boundary Polygons, Detailed, US Officer of the Geographer.

Tourism in Uganda is focused on Uganda's landscape and wildlife. It is a major driver of employment, investment and foreign exchange, contributing 4.9 trillion Ugandan shillings (US$1.88 billion or €1.4 billion as of August 2013) to Uganda's GDP in the financial year 2012–13. The Uganda Tourism Board is responsible for maintaining information pertaining to tourism in Uganda. The main attractions are photo safaris through the National parks and game Reserves. Other attractions include the Mountain Gorillas found in Bwindi Impenetrable National Park (BINP) and Mgahinga Gorilla National Park (MGNP), Uganda having some of the oldest cultural kingdom in Africa has many Cultural sites. Uganda is a birding paradise boasting a massive bird list of more than 1073 recorded bird species ranking 4th in Africa's bird species and 16th internationally. Uganda has landscapes ranging from white-capped Rwenzori mountains to the Great Rift Valley.

== Science and technology ==
The National Science, Technology and Innovation Policy dates from 2009. Its overarching goal is to 'strengthen national capability to generate, transfer and apply scientific knowledge, skills and technologies that ensure sustainable utilisation of natural resources for the realisation of Uganda's development objectives.' The policy precedes Uganda Vision 2040, which was launched in April 2013 to transform 'Ugandan society from a peasant to a modern and prosperous country within 30 years,' in the words of the Cabinet. Uganda Vision 2040 vows to strengthen the private sector, improve education and training, modernise infrastructure and the underdeveloped services and agriculture sectors, foster industrialisation and promote good governance, among other goals. Potential areas for economic development include oil and gas, tourism, minerals and information and communication technologies (ICTs).

Uganda was ranked 124th in the Global Innovation Index in 2025, down from 102nd in 2019. Research funding climbed between 2008 and 2010 from 0.33% to 0.48% of GDP. Over the same period, the number of researchers doubled (in head counts) from 1 387 to 2 823, according to the UNESCO Institute for Statistics. This represents a leap from 44 to 83 researchers per million inhabitants over the same period. One in four researchers is a woman.

== Demographics ==
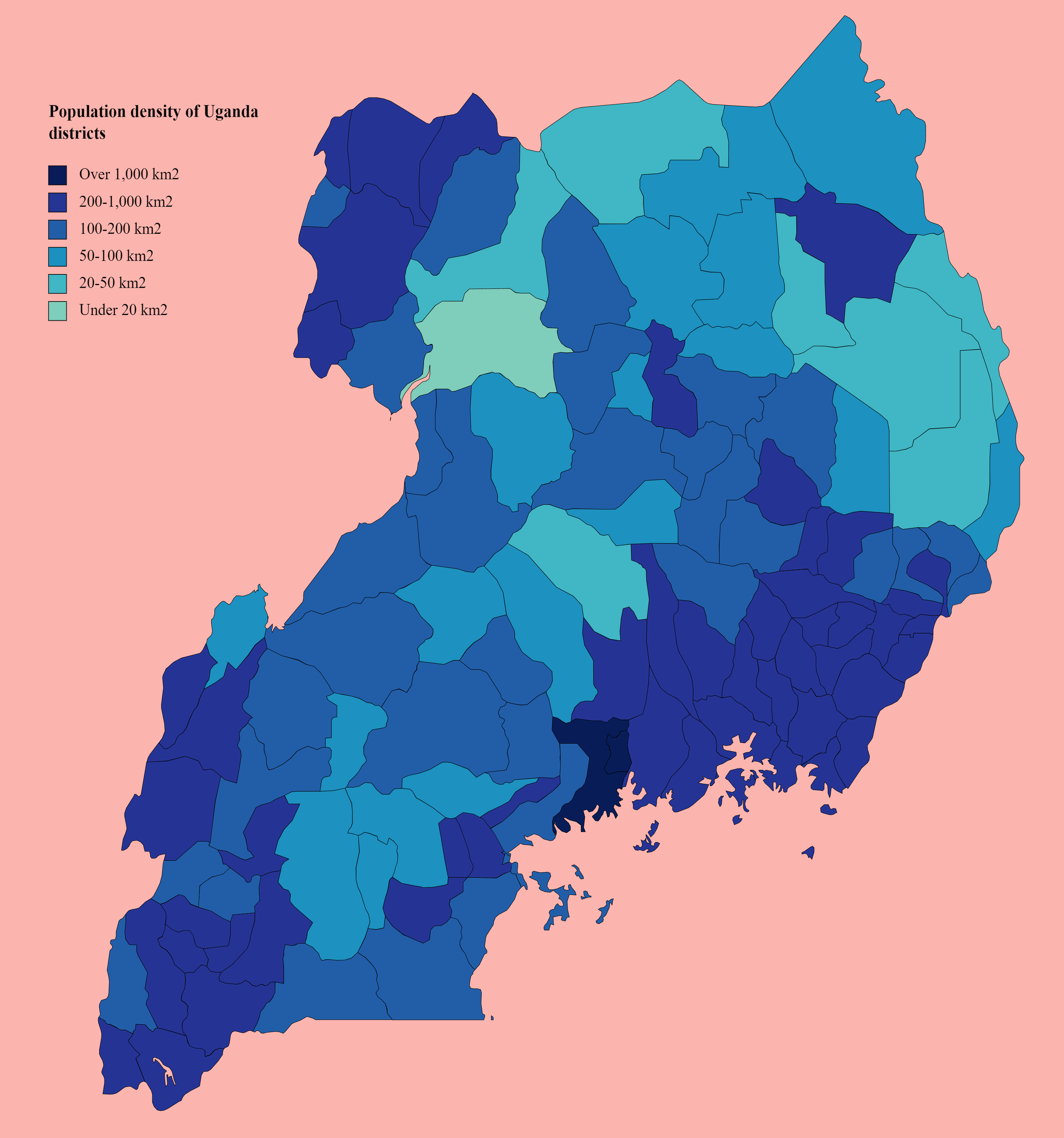
The population density of Ugandan districts

Uganda's population grew from 9.5 million people in 1969 to 34.9 million in 2014. In 2024, the population was 45.9 million. With respect to the census in 2002, the population increased by 21.7 million people in those 22 years. Uganda's median age of 15 years is the lowest in the world. In 2014, Uganda had the fifth highest total fertility rate in the world, at 5.97 children born per woman.

Of Uganda's population, 23.6 million (51.4 per cent) were female and 22.3 million were male. In 2024, 49.5 per cent of Ugandans were under the age of 18, underscoring the country's very young age structure.

There were about 80,000 Indians in Uganda before Idi Amin required the expulsion of Ugandan-Asians, mostly of Indian origin, in 1972, which reduced the population to as low as 7,000. Many Indians returned to Uganda after Amin's ouster in 1979. Around 90 per cent of Ugandan Indians reside in Kampala. There are a population of about 10,000 white Africans and 3,000 Arabs in Uganda.

In August 2021, Uganda hosted over 1.4 million refugees on its soil. Most come from neighbouring countries in the African Great Lakes region, particularly South Sudan (68.0 per cent) and Democratic Republic of the Congo (24.6%). In August 2021, Uganda received some refugees from Afghanistan following the Taliban takeover.

=== Languages ===
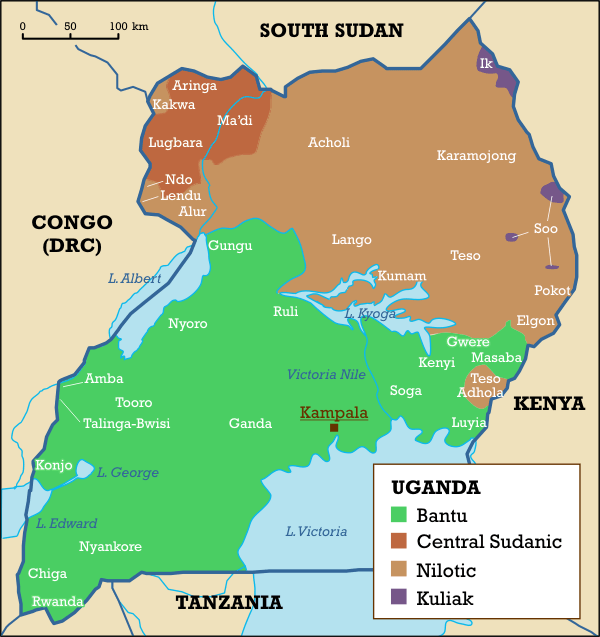
An ethnolinguistic map of Uganda

Swahili, a widely used language throughout the African Great Lakes region, was approved as the country's second official national language in 2005. English was the only official language until the constitution was amended in 2005. Uganda has its own dialect of English, known as Uglish.

Swahili is not favoured by the Bantu-speaking populations of the south and south-west of Uganda, but is an important lingua franca in the northern regions. Swahili is widely used in the police and military forces, which may be a historical result of the disproportionate recruitment of northerners into the security forces during the colonial period. The status of Swahili has thus alternated with the political group in power. For example, Idi Amin, who came from the north-west, declared Swahili to be the national language.

=== Religion ===
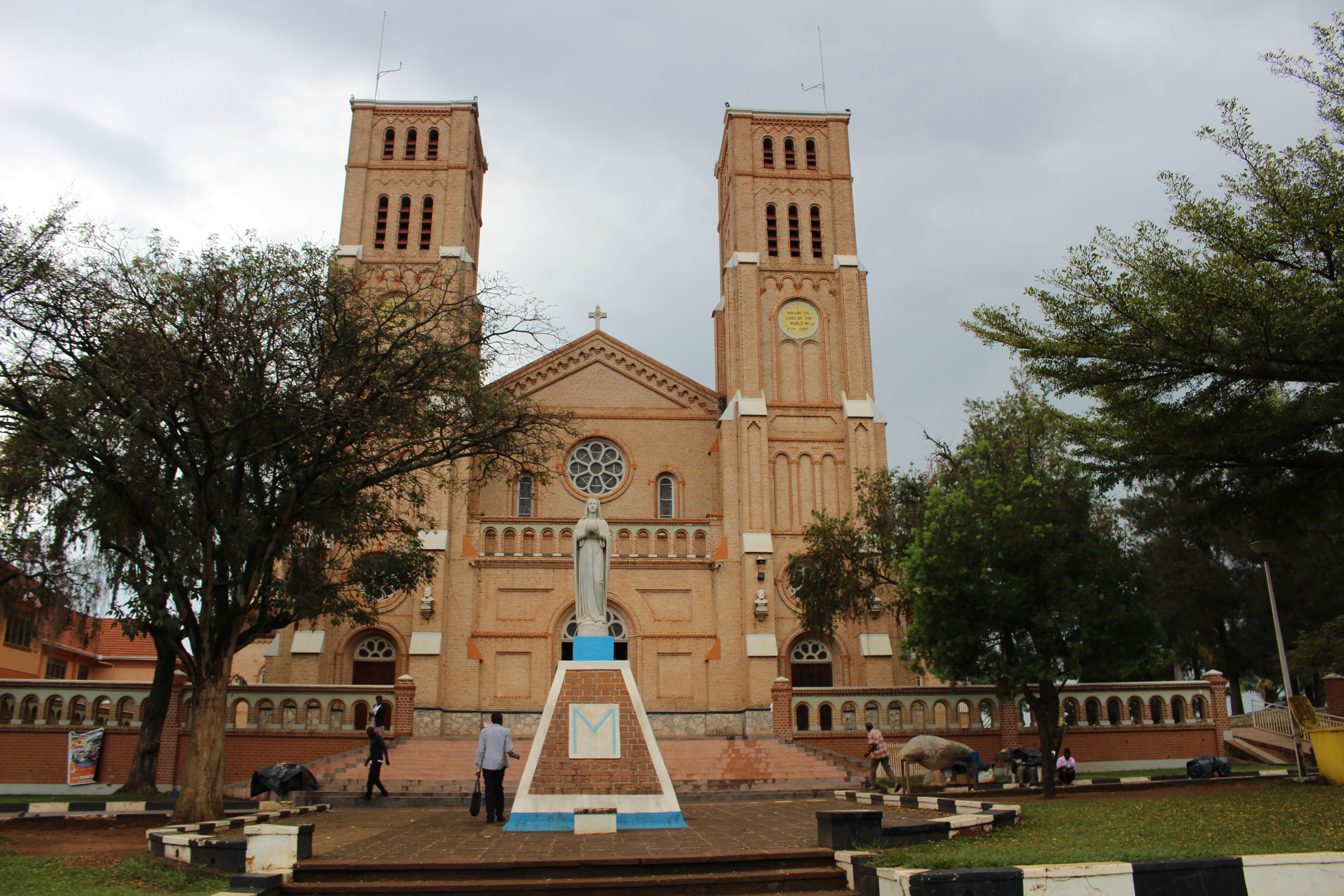
Saint Mary's Cathedral Rubaga is the parent cathedral of the Roman Catholic Archdiocese of Kampala.

The Catholic Church had the largest number of adherents (39.3 per cent, down from 41.6 in 2002), followed by the Anglican Church of Uganda (32 per cent, down from 35.9 per cent). The category of Evangelical/Pentecostal/Born-Again showed the most growth, rising from 4.7% in 2002 to 11.1% in 2018. Adventist and other Protestant churches claimed most of the remaining Christians, although there was also a small Eastern Orthodox community.

The next most reported religion of Uganda was Islam, with Muslims representing 14% per cent of the population, up from 12.1% in 2002.

The remainder of the population in the 2014 census followed traditional religions (0.1 per cent, down from 1% in 2002), other religions (1.4 per cent), or had no religious affiliation (0.2 per cent).

=== Largest cities and towns ===
Largest urban centres in Uganda (2014)
Rank	Name	District	Pop.
1	Kampala	Kampala	1,507,114
2	Nansana	Wakiso	365,857
3	Kira	Wakiso	317,428
4	Makindye Ssabagabo	Wakiso	282,664
5	Mbarara	Mbarara	195,160
6	Mukono	Mukono	162,744
7	Gulu	Gulu	149,802
8	Lugazi	Buikwe	114,163
9	Kasese	Kasese	103,293
10	Masaka	Masaka	101,557

== Culture ==
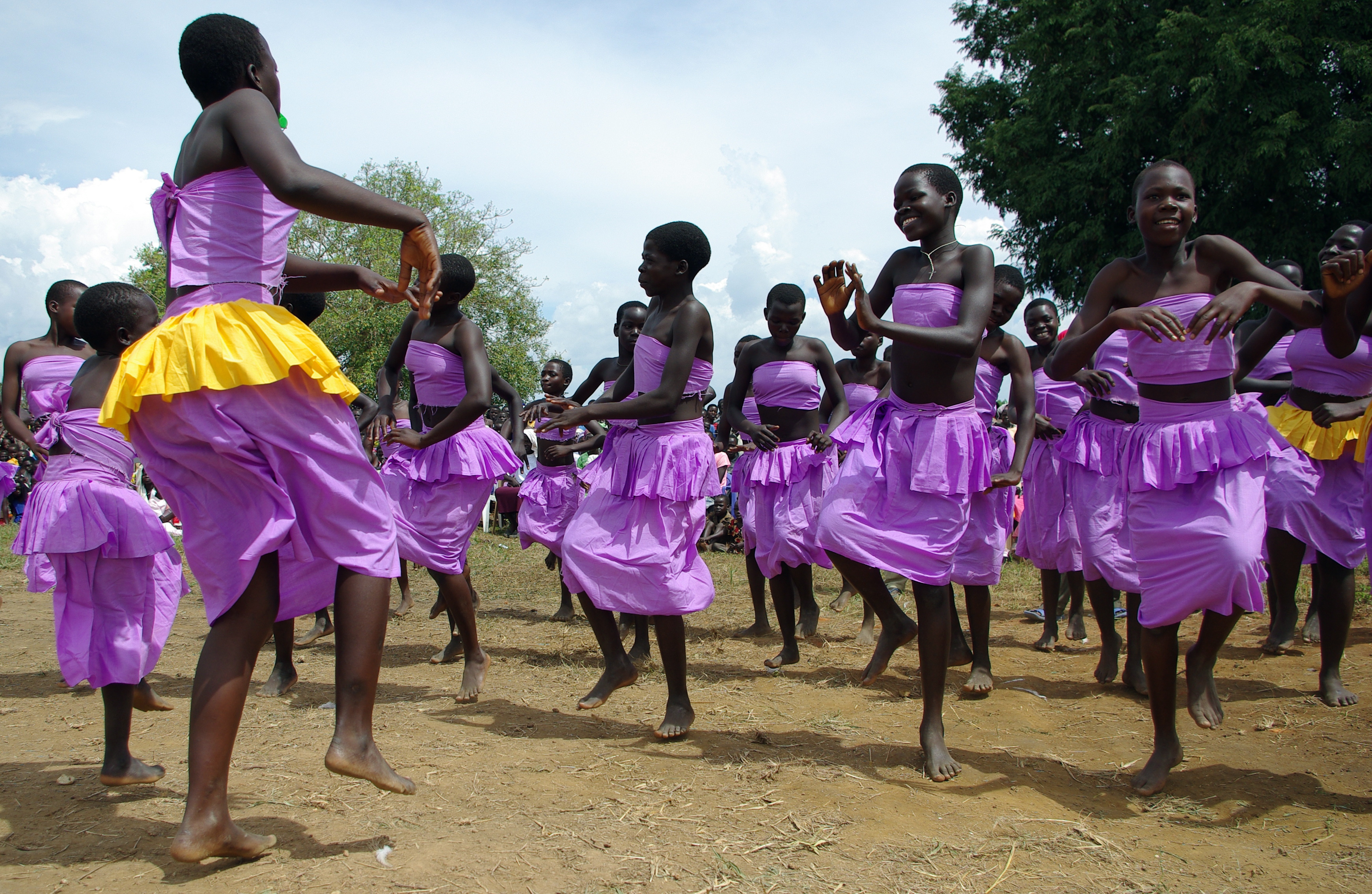
Cultural celebrations in Northern Uganda

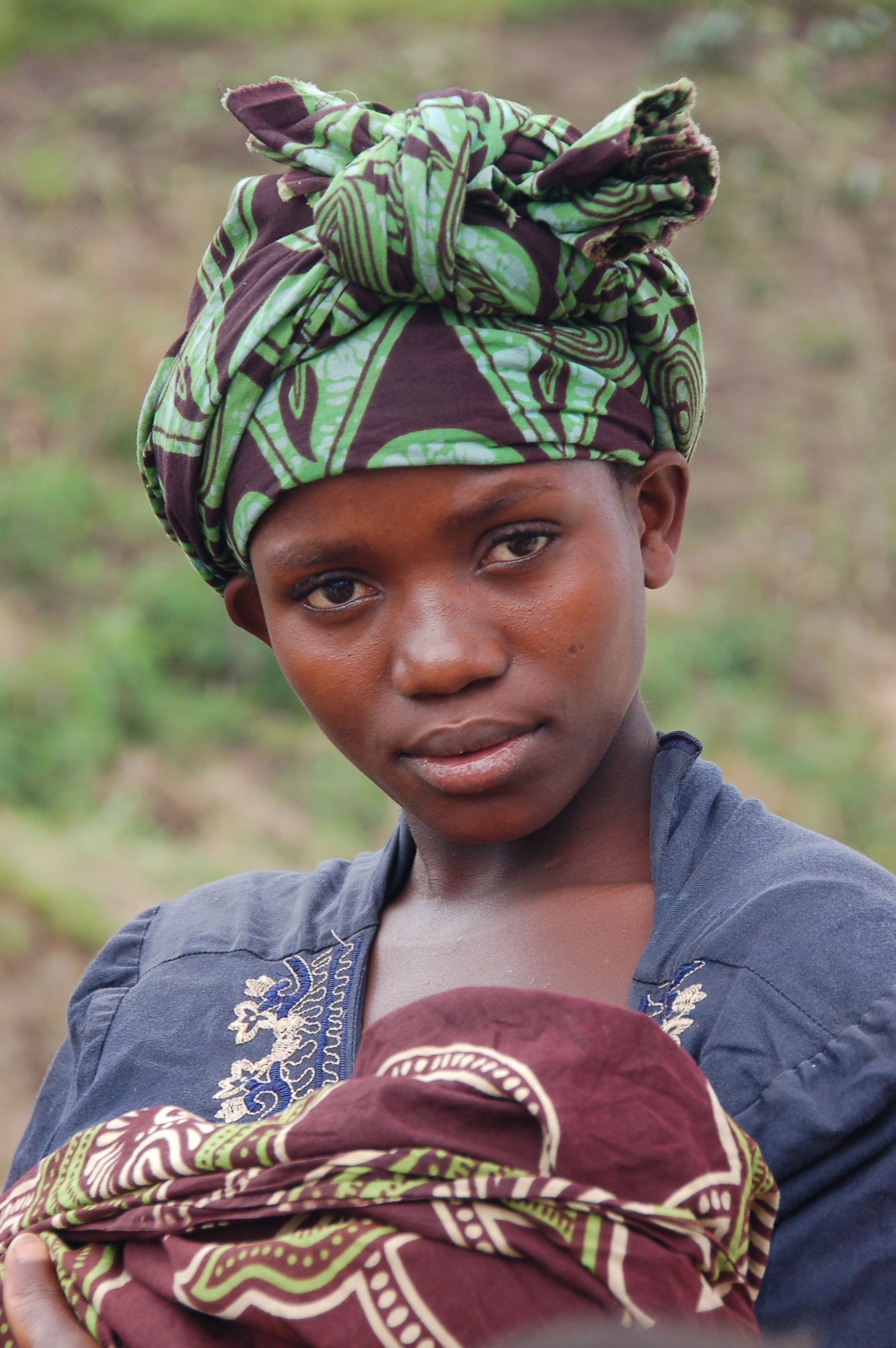
Woman in Rwenzori – Western Uganda

Owing to the large number of communities, culture within Uganda is diverse. Many Asians (mostly from India) who were expelled during the regime of Idi Amin have returned to Uganda.

=== Media ===
Uganda has a number of media outlets that broadcast domestically and globally. They cover news, magazines, sports, business and entertainment.

Popular Ugandan newspapers include:

- New Vision
- Daily Monitor
- Bukedde
- The Observer
- East African Business Week
- Red Pepper

The most popular television stations in Uganda include:

- Uganda Broadcasting Corporation (UBC)
- NTV
- NBS Television
- Sanyuka TV
- Baba TV
- Top TV
- Spark TV

All of the media is controlled and regulated under the Uganda Communications Commission (UCC).

=== Sports ===
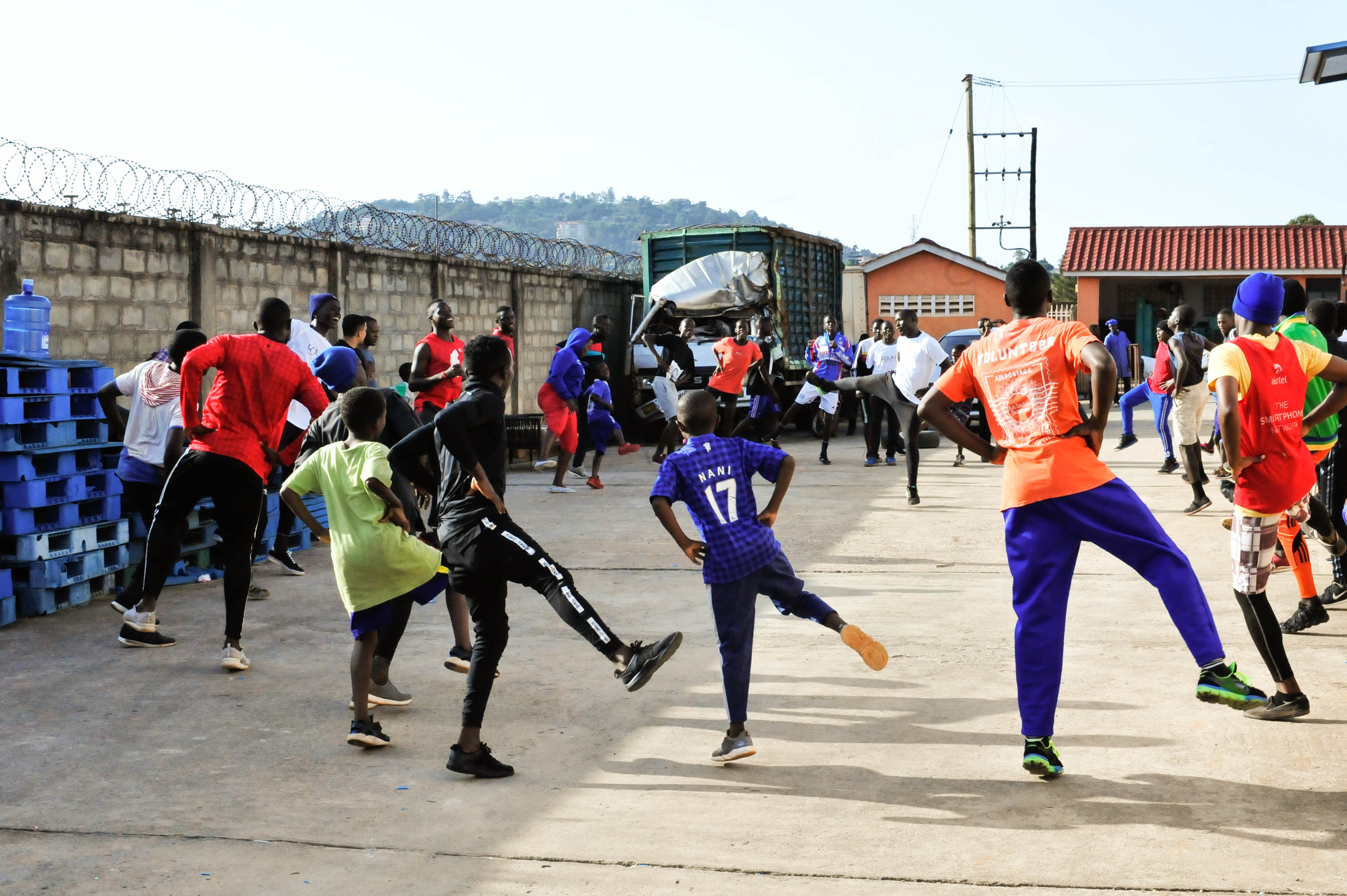
Aerobics

Football is the national sport in Uganda. The Uganda national football team, nicknamed "The Cranes", is controlled by the Federation of Uganda Football Associations. They have never qualified for the FIFA World Cup finals. Their best finish in the African Cup of Nations was second in 1978. Among clubs, SC Villa are the most successful, having won the national league 17 times and having reached the final of the African Cup of Champions Clubs in 1991, a feat also achieved by Simba SC in 1972. KCCA are second in national league wins with 13.

As of 2020, Uganda at the Olympics has won a total of two gold, three silver, and two bronze medals, four of which were in boxing and three in athletics. At the Commonwealth Games, Uganda has collected 13 gold medals and a total 49 medals, all in boxing and athletics.

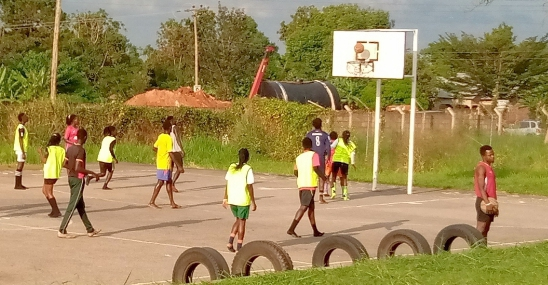
Basketball

The Uganda national boxing team is called The Bombers. They have won four medals at the Summer Olympics from 1968 to 1980, as well as two medals the 1974 World Amateur Boxing Championships. Notable boxers include Cornelius Boza-Edwards, Justin Juuko, Ayub Kalule, John Mugabi, Eridadi Mukwanga, Joseph Nsubuga, Kassim Ouma, Sam Rukundo and Leo Rwabwogo.

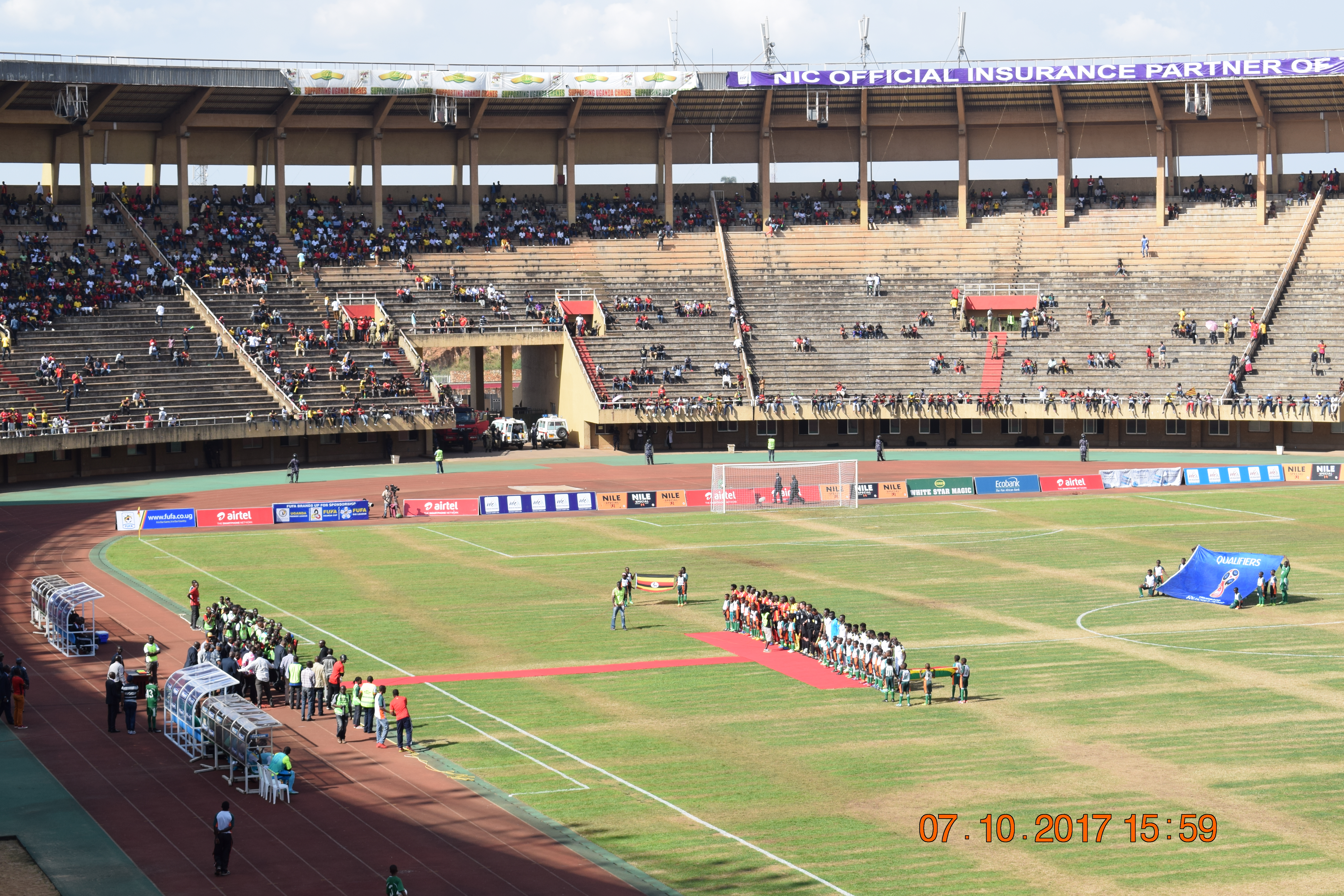
Football match in Uganda

In athletics, John Akii-Bua won the first Olympic gold medal for Uganda. At the 1972 Summer Olympics in Munich, he won the 400m hurdles race with a world record time of 47.82 seconds. 400 metres runner Davis Kamoga earned the bronze medal at 1996 Summer Olympics in Atlanta and the silver medal at the 1997 World Championships. Dorcus Inzikuru won the 3000 m steeplechase at the 2005 World Championships and the 2006 Commonwealth Games.

Stephen Kiprotich has won the marathon at the 2012 Summer Olympics in London and the 2013 World Championships, and finished second at the 2015 Tokyo Marathon. Joshua Cheptegei has won 10 km races at the World Championships, World Athletics Cross Country Championships and Commonwealth Games, and has set world records in 5 km and 15 km. Halimah Nakaayi won the 800 meters race at the 2019 World Championships.

In cricket, Uganda was part of the East Africa team that qualified for the Cricket World Cup in 1975. The Uganda national cricket team qualified for the 2024 ICC T20 World Cup.

The country has an increasingly successful national basketball team. It is nicknamed "The Silverbacks", and made its debut at the 2015 FIBA Africa Championship.

In July 2011, Kampala, Uganda qualified for the 2011 Little League World Series in Williamsport, Pennsylvania for the first time, beating Saudi Arabian baseball team Dharan LL, although visa complications prevented them from attending the series. Little League teams from Uganda qualified for and attended the 2012 Little League World Series.

=== Cinema ===
The Ugandan film industry is relatively young. It is developing quickly, but still faces an assortment of challenges. There has been support for the industry as seen in the proliferation of film festivals such as Amakula, Pearl International Film Festival, Maisha African Film Festival and Manya Human Rights Festival. However, filmmakers struggle against the competing markets from other countries on the continent such as those in Nigeria and South Africa in addition to the big budget films from Hollywood.

The first publicly recognised film that was produced solely by Ugandans was Feelings Struggle, which was directed and written by Hajji Ashraf Ssemwogerere in 2005. This marks the year of ascent of film in Uganda, a time when many enthusiasts were proud to classify themselves as cinematographers in varied capacities.

The local film industry is polarised between two types of filmmakers. The first are filmmakers who use the Nollywood video film era's guerrilla approach to film making, churning out a picture in around two weeks and screening it in makeshift video halls. The second is the filmmaker who has the film aesthetic, but with limited funds has to depend on the competitive scramble for donor cash.

Though cinema in Uganda is evolving, it still faces major challenges. Along with technical problems such as refining acting and editing skills, there are issues regarding funding and lack of government support and investment. There are no schools in the country dedicated to film, banks do not extend credit to film ventures, and distribution and marketing of movies remains poor.

The Uganda Communications Commission (UCC) prepared regulations starting in 2014 that required Ugandan television to broadcast 70 per cent Ugandan content and of this, 40 per cent to be independent productions. With the emphasis on Ugandan film and the UCC regulations favouring Ugandan productions for mainstream television, Ugandan film may become more prominent and successful in the near future.

== See also ==
- Outline of Uganda
- Railway stations in Uganda
