= Geography of Uganda =

Coordinates: 1°00′N 32°00′E

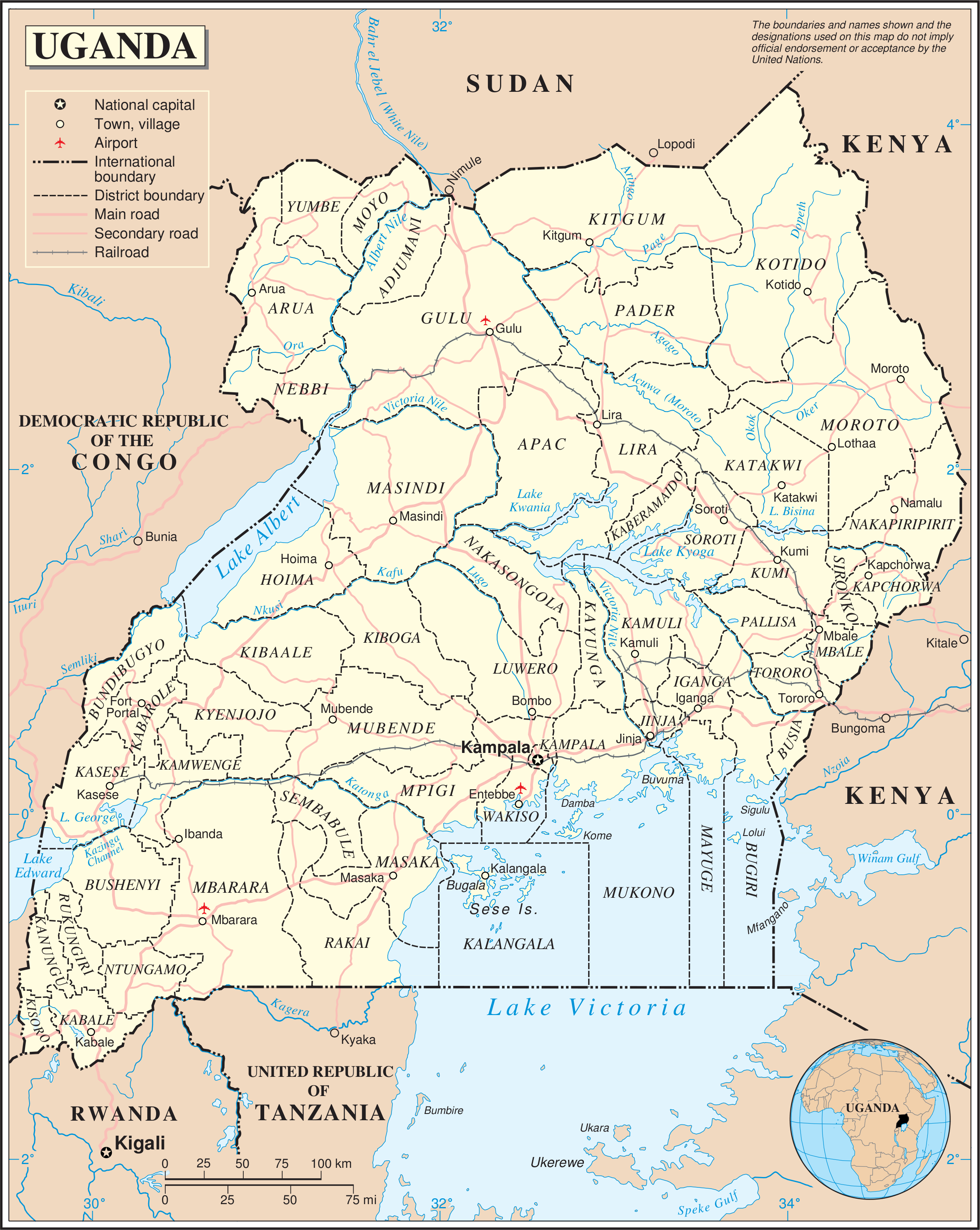
A United Nations map of Uganda

Location of Uganda

Uganda map of Köppen climate classification.

Uganda is located in Eastern Africa, west of Kenya, south of South Sudan, east of the Democratic Republic of the Congo, and north of Rwanda and Tanzania. Despite its lengthy lakeshore, Uganda is landlocked with no access to sea. Uganda sits in the heart of the Great Lakes region and consists of many lakes and rivers including the largest fresh water lake in Africa, Lake Victoria. Other notable lakes include Lake Edward, Lake George and Lake Albert along its western border and Lake Kyoga in the east. The longest river in the world, the Nile, flows through Uganda as well as the Kagera River, Katonga River, Semiliki River and Sezibwa River.

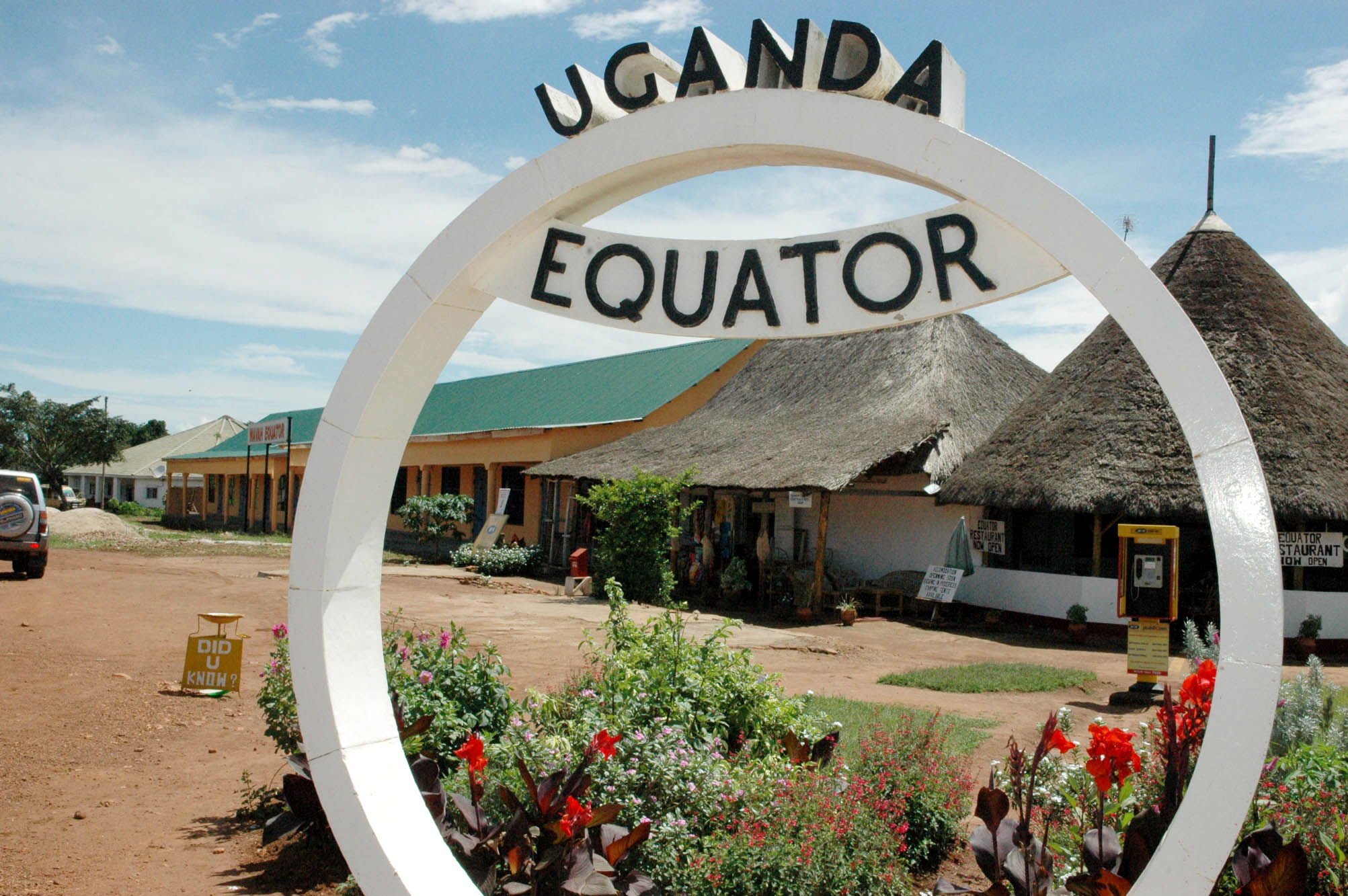
Equator Uganda2.jpg

The climate is generally tropical and equatorial with two dry periods from December to February and June to August. The northeast of the country is semiarid, including Moroto, Kabong, Nakapiripiriti, and Karenga districts. The terrain of Uganda mostly consist of plateaus surrounded by a rim of mountains including the Rwenzori Mountain range. Notable national parks include Bwindi, Rwenzori Mountains which has snow on its peak, Margherita, Kibale, Mgahinga National Park, Mount Elgon National game Park, Kidepo National game Park and Queen Elizabeth National game Park, with thick forests to modify climate. Uganda's plant cover is Savannah. However, forests also act as a source of Herbal Medicine. Some geographical places like Jinja and Kapchorwa have water Springs like Murchison Falls, Bujagali Falls, karuma falls and Sipii falls that aids Hydro Electric Power Generation and to cite out; Bujagali falls generates 5 MW that is exported to our physically disadvantaged neighbourhood in the names Rwanda and Burundi. Inselbergs are common features in the geography of Uganda. The inselbergs are commonly made of granite, sometimes of gneiss and never of amphibolite or volcanic rock. Protruding quartzite hills tend to form ridges rather than "true inselbergs".

== Statistics ==
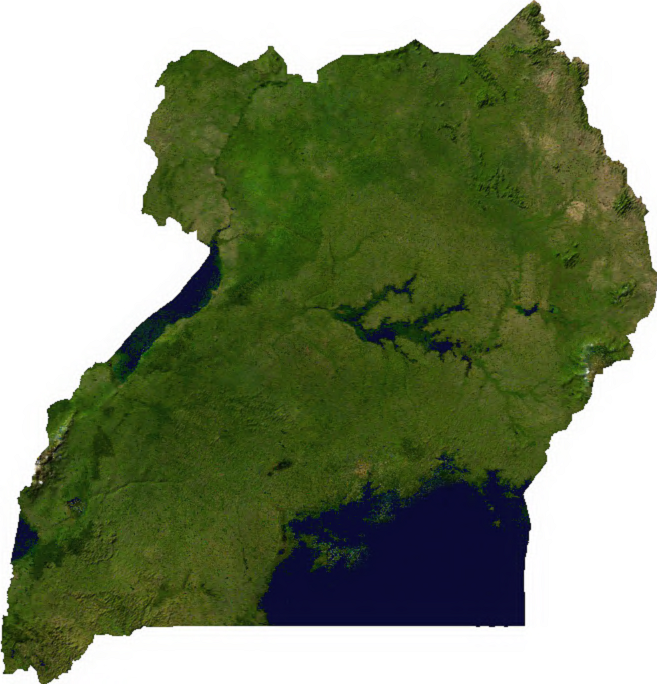
A satellite map of Uganda.

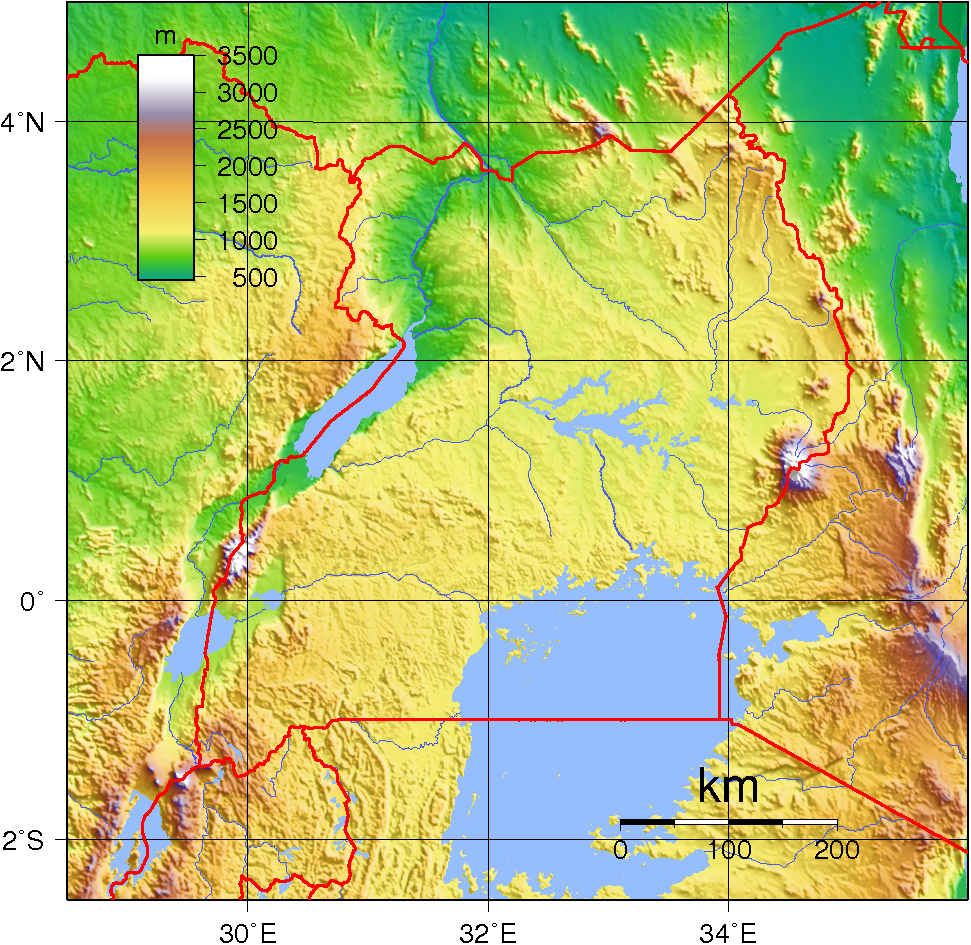
A topographic map of Uganda.

Area:
total: 241,551 square kilometres (93,263 mi^{2})
land: 200,523 square kilometres (77,422 mi^{2})
water: 41,028 square kilometres (15,841 mi^{2})

Area comparative
- Australia comparative: slightly larger than Victoria
- Canada comparative: slightly less than half the size of the Yukon
- United States comparative: slightly smaller than Wyoming
- EU comparative: slightly larger than Romania

Land boundaries:
total: 2,729 kilometres (1,696 mi)
border countries: Democratic Republic of the Congo 877 kilometres (545 mi), Kenya 814 kilometres (506 mi), South Sudan 475 kilometres (295 mi), Tanzania 391 kilometres (243 mi), Rwanda 172 kilometres (107 mi)

Elevation extremes:
lowest point: 614 metres (2,014 ft) Albert Nile at border with South Sudan
highest point: 5,111 metres (16,768 ft) Margherita Peak on Mount Stanley

Natural resources:
copper, cobalt, hydropower, limestone, salt, arable land, gold

Land use: (2012)
arable land: 69,000 square kilometres (27,000 square miles) 34.41%
permanent crops: 22,500 square kilometres (8,700 square miles) 11.22%
forest cover: 28,100 square kilometres (10,800 square miles) 14.01%
other: 80,931 square kilometres (31,248 mi^{2}) 40.36%

Irrigated land: (2012)
140 square kilometres (54 square miles)

Total renewable water resources:
66 cubic kilometres (16 mi^{3}) (2011) or 60 cubic kilometres (14 mi^{3}) (2012)

Environment — current issues:
draining of wetlands for agricultural use, deforestation, overgrazing, soil erosion, water hyacinth infestation in Lake Victoria, widespread poaching

Environment — international agreements:
party to:

- Convention on the International Maritime Organization
- Convention Concerning the Protection of the World Cultural and Natural Heritage
- Agreement on the Conservation of African-Eurasian Migratory Waterbirds
- United Nations Framework Convention on Climate Change
- Vienna Convention for the Protection of the Ozone Layer
- Kyoto Protocol to the United Nations Framework Convention on Climate Change
- Convention on International Trade in Endangered Species of Wild Fauna and Flora
- Basel Convention on the Control of Transboundary Movements of Hazardous Wastes and Their Disposal
- United Nations Convention on the Law of the Sea
- Convention on Biological Diversity
- United Nations Convention to Combat Desertification in Those Countries Experiencing Serious Drought and/or Desertification, Particularly in Africa
- International Plant Protection Convention
- Convention on Wetlands of International Importance, especially as Waterfowl Habitat

signed, but not ratified:

- Convention on the Prohibition of Military or Any Other Hostile Use of Environmental Modification Techniques

Geography — note: Uganda is one of six African states that lies on the equator. Most of Uganda lies north of the equator.

== Climate ==
Uganda has a warm tropical climate with temperatures falling in the 25 to 29 °C (77.0 to 84.2 °F) range on an average. The months from December to February are the hottest, but even during this season the evenings can be pleasant with temperatures in the 17 to 18 °C (62.6 to 64.4 °F) range.

Most of Uganda receives an annual rainfall of 1,000 to 1,500 millimetres or 40 to 60 inches. The rainy seasons are from March to May and from September to November. During these months, heavy rains can make roads and terrains hard to traverse. The period from January to February and again from June to August are dry. In the north, there is only one rainy season from March to November, and a dry season from December to February.

Climate data for Kampala
Month	Jan	Feb	Mar	Apr	May	Jun	Jul	Aug	Sep	Oct	Nov	Dec	Year
Record high °C (°F)	33 (91)	36 (97)	33 (91)	33 (91)	29 (84)	29 (84)	29 (84)	29 (84)	31 (88)	32 (90)	32 (90)	32 (90)	36 (97)
Mean daily maximum °C (°F)	28.6 (83.5)	29.3 (84.7)	28.7 (83.7)	27.7 (81.9)	27.3 (81.1)	27.1 (80.8)	26.9 (80.4)	27.2 (81.0)	27.9 (82.2)	27.7 (81.9)	27.4 (81.3)	27.9 (82.2)	27.8 (82.0)
Daily mean °C (°F)	23.2 (73.8)	23.7 (74.7)	23.4 (74.1)	22.9 (73.2)	22.6 (72.7)	22.4 (72.3)	22.0 (71.6)	22.2 (72.0)	22.6 (72.7)	22.6 (72.7)	22.5 (72.5)	22.7 (72.9)	22.7 (72.9)
Mean daily minimum °C (°F)	17.7 (63.9)	18.0 (64.4)	18.1 (64.6)	18.0 (64.4)	17.9 (64.2)	17.6 (63.7)	17.1 (62.8)	17.1 (62.8)	17.2 (63.0)	17.4 (63.3)	17.5 (63.5)	17.5 (63.5)	17.6 (63.7)
Record low °C (°F)	12 (54)	14 (57)	13 (55)	14 (57)	15 (59)	12 (54)	12 (54)	12 (54)	13 (55)	13 (55)	14 (57)	12 (54)	12 (54)
Average rainfall mm (inches)	68.4 (2.69)	63.0 (2.48)	131.5 (5.18)	169.3 (6.67)	117.5 (4.63)	69.2 (2.72)	63.1 (2.48)	95.7 (3.77)	108.4 (4.27)	138.0 (5.43)	148.7 (5.85)	91.5 (3.60)	1,264.3 (49.77)
Average rainy days (≥ 1.0 mm)	4.8	5.1	9.5	12.2	10.9	6.3	4.7	6.7	8.6	9.1	8.4	7.4	93.7
Average relative humidity (%)	66	68.5	73	78.5	80.5	78.5	77.5	77.5	75.5	73.5	73	71.5	74.5
Mean monthly sunshine hours	155	170	155	120	124	180	186	155	150	155	150	124	1,824
Source 1: World Meteorological Organization, Climate-Data.org for mean temperatures
Source 2: BBC Weather

Climate data for Gulu
Month	Jan	Feb	Mar	Apr	May	Jun	Jul	Aug	Sep	Oct	Nov	Dec	Year
Mean daily maximum °C (°F)	32.1 (89.8)	32.3 (90.1)	31.2 (88.2)	29.3 (84.7)	28.2 (82.8)	27.7 (81.9)	26.7 (80.1)	26.9 (80.4)	28.1 (82.6)	28.7 (83.7)	29.7 (85.5)	30.4 (86.7)	29.3 (84.7)
Daily mean °C (°F)	24.2 (75.6)	24.6 (76.3)	24.3 (75.7)	23.4 (74.1)	22.8 (73.0)	22.3 (72.1)	21.6 (70.9)	21.7 (71.1)	22.3 (72.1)	22.5 (72.5)	23 (73)	23.2 (73.8)	23.0 (73.4)
Mean daily minimum °C (°F)	16.4 (61.5)	17 (63)	17.5 (63.5)	17.6 (63.7)	17.4 (63.3)	16.9 (62.4)	16.5 (61.7)	16.5 (61.7)	16.5 (61.7)	16.4 (61.5)	16.4 (61.5)	16.1 (61.0)	16.8 (62.2)
Average rainfall mm (inches)	17 (0.7)	32 (1.3)	88 (3.5)	164 (6.5)	182 (7.2)	146 (5.7)	159 (6.3)	217 (8.5)	179 (7.0)	185 (7.3)	102 (4.0)	36 (1.4)	1,507 (59.4)
Source: Climate-Data.org, altitude: 1116m

Climate data for Entebbe, Uganda (1961–1990)
Month	Jan	Feb	Mar	Apr	May	Jun	Jul	Aug	Sep	Oct	Nov	Dec	Year
Record high °C (°F)	31.3 (88.3)	31.7 (89.1)	30.6 (87.1)	30.0 (86.0)	28.9 (84.0)	27.8 (82.0)	28.1 (82.6)	28.9 (84.0)	29.8 (85.6)	29.6 (85.3)	31.7 (89.1)	29.5 (85.1)	31.7 (89.1)
Mean daily maximum °C (°F)	26.3 (79.3)	27.3 (81.1)	26.7 (80.1)	26.0 (78.8)	25.4 (77.7)	25.2 (77.4)	25.3 (77.5)	25.9 (78.6)	26.5 (79.7)	26.5 (79.7)	26.0 (78.8)	26.5 (79.7)	26.1 (79.0)
Mean daily minimum °C (°F)	18.0 (64.4)	18.3 (64.9)	18.5 (65.3)	18.4 (65.1)	18.0 (64.4)	17.8 (64.0)	17.2 (63.0)	17.4 (63.3)	17.4 (63.3)	17.7 (63.9)	17.9 (64.2)	17.8 (64.0)	17.9 (64.2)
Record low °C (°F)	13.0 (55.4)	10.7 (51.3)	14.4 (57.9)	12.2 (54.0)	14.3 (57.7)	14.0 (57.2)	10.0 (50.0)	12.0 (53.6)	13.2 (55.8)	13.9 (57.0)	14.3 (57.7)	13.8 (56.8)	10.0 (50.0)
Average precipitation mm (inches)	86.7 (3.41)	84.4 (3.32)	184.5 (7.26)	264.4 (10.41)	253.8 (9.99)	116.2 (4.57)	72.1 (2.84)	77.8 (3.06)	79.0 (3.11)	127.6 (5.02)	171.7 (6.76)	120.6 (4.75)	1,638.8 (64.52)
Average precipitation days (≥ 1.0 mm)	7.3	7.3	13.1	16.8	16.2	9.4	6.9	6.3	7.1	10.7	13.6	10.2	124.9
Average relative humidity (%)	76	76	77	79	79	78	77	78	76	75	76	76	77
Mean monthly sunshine hours	234	204	205	181	191	187	197	194	194	205	202	214	2,408
Source 1: World Meteorological Organization
Source 2: Deutscher Wetterdienst (extremes and humidity), Danish Meteorological Institute (sun, 1931–1960)

=== Climate change ===
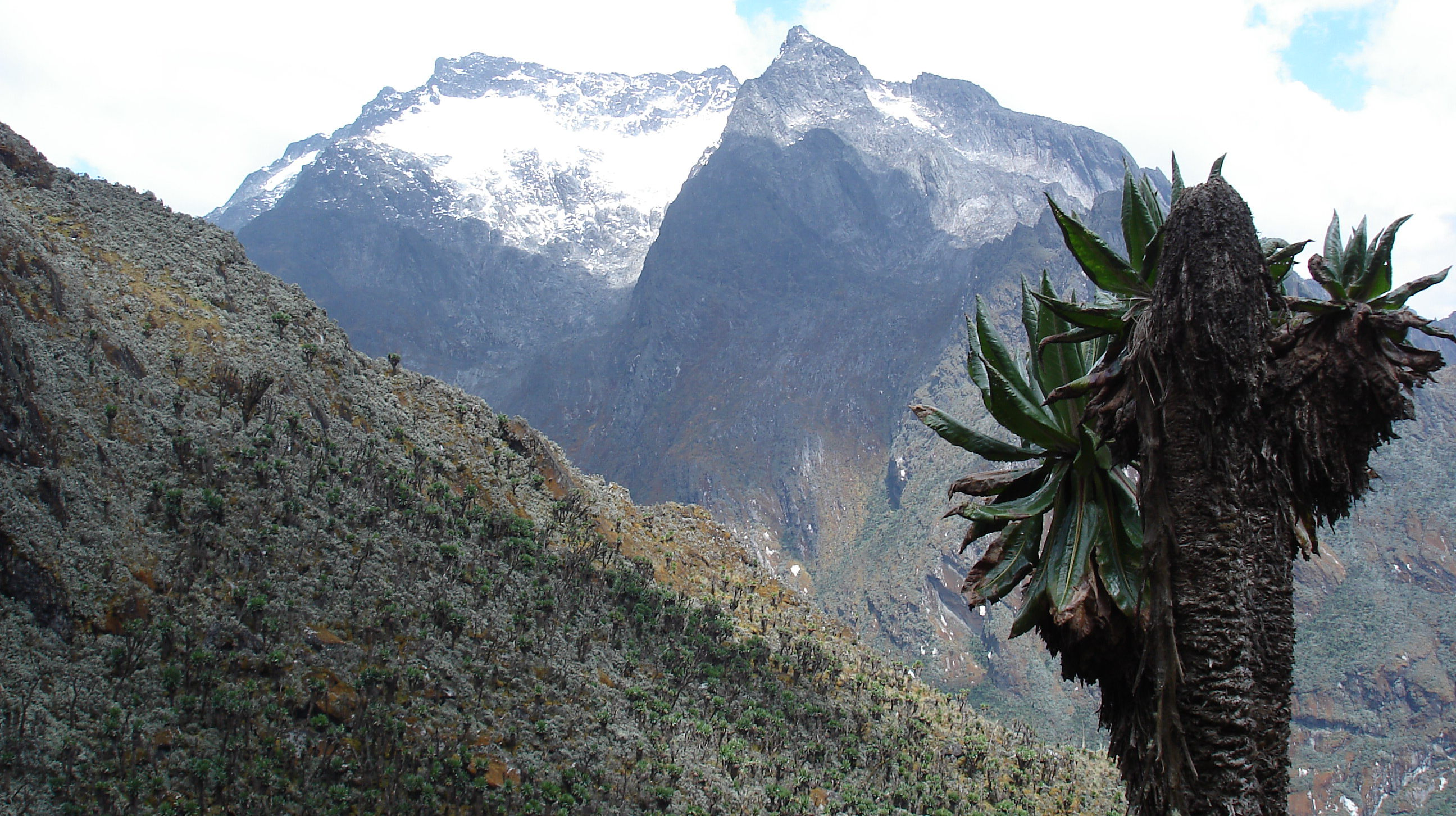
Glaciers on the Rwenzori Mountains, like these on Mount Speke, are melting due to climate change.

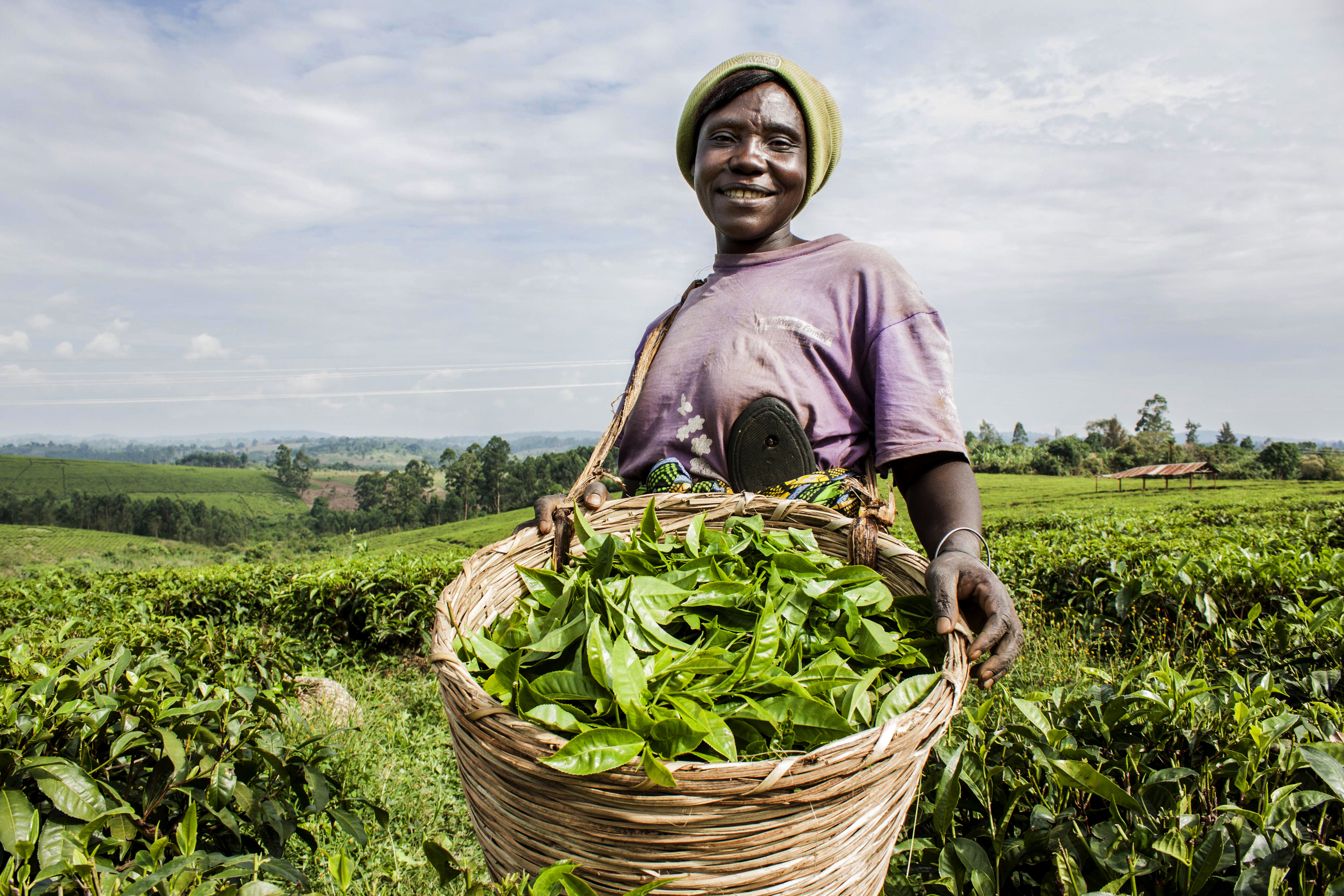
Tea plantation in Uganda

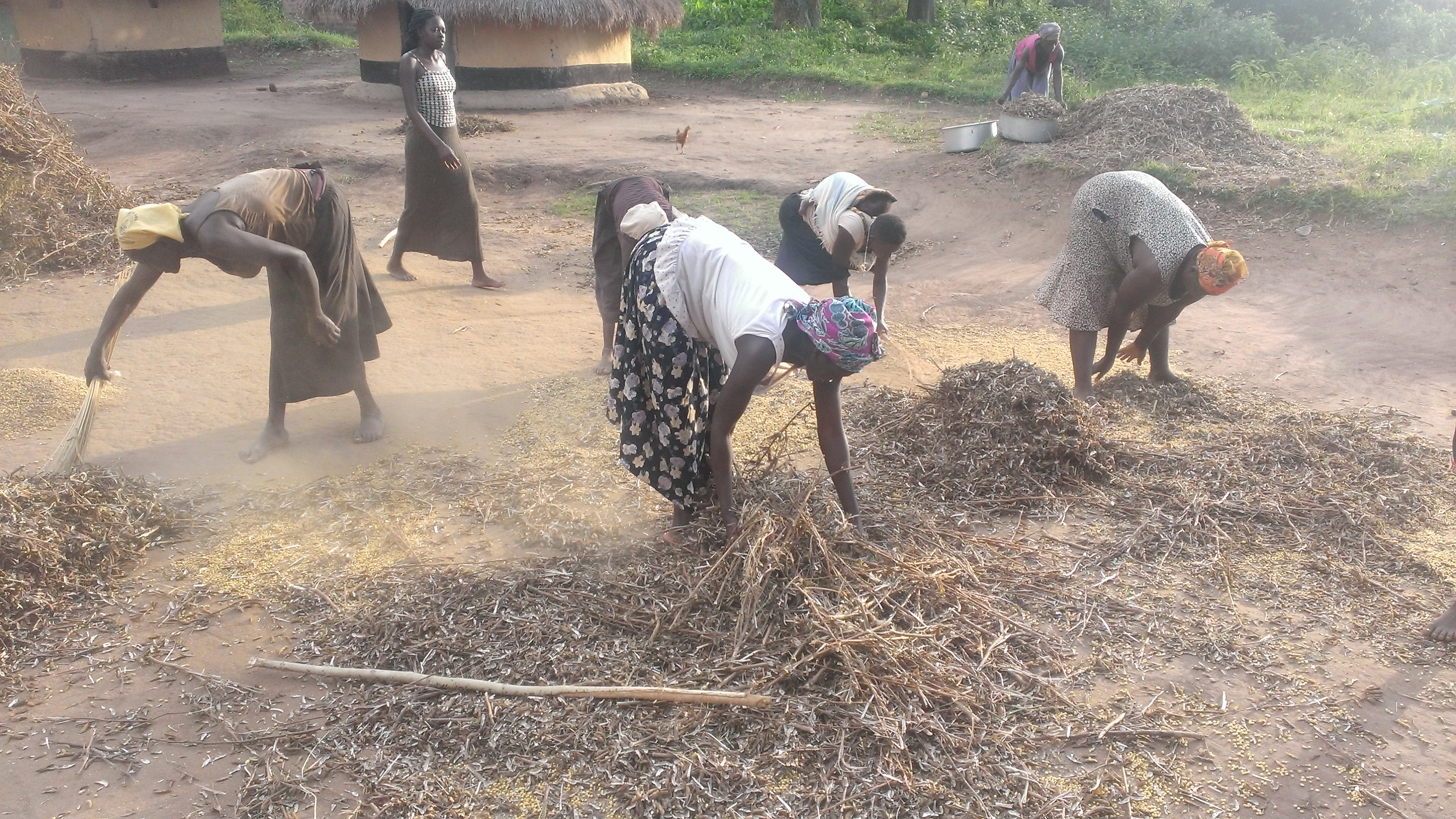
Women fighting food insecurity during harvests in dry season

The effects of climate change in Uganda are increasingly severe, affecting the lives of the country's citizens and its environment. It has led to extreme weather events such as unpredictable, prolonged drought and rainfall. Uganda's climate is mostly tropical with regular rainfall and sunshine patterns. Due to climate change the seasons have changed, with the rainy season becoming more variable in length and droughts more ubiquitous, especially in eastern and northeastern Uganda. Climate trends have the potential to affect development of Uganda, due to the vulnerability of Uganda's diverse environment.

== See also ==
- List of Protected Areas in Uganda
