= Albertine Rift =

Western branch of the East African Rift

Coordinates: 9°S 34°E

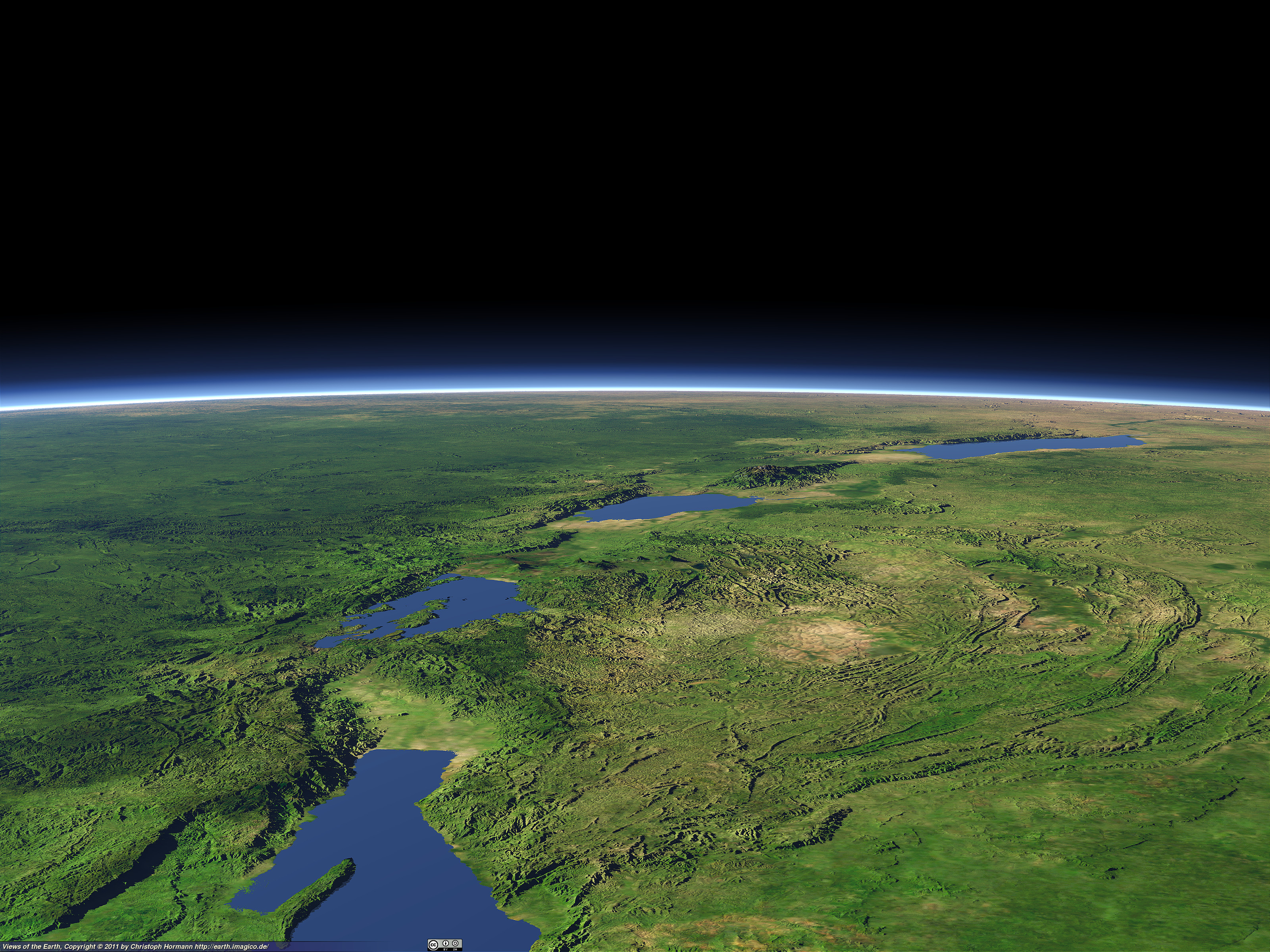
An artificial rendering of the Albertine Rift. Visible features include (from background to foreground, looking north): Lake Albert, Rwenzori Mountains, Lake Edward, Virunga Mountains, Lake Kivu, and northern Lake Tanganyika

The Albertine Rift is the western branch of the East African Rift, covering parts of Uganda, the Democratic Republic of the Congo (DRC), Rwanda, Burundi and Tanzania. It extends from the northern end of Lake Albert to the southern end of Lake Tanganyika. The geographical term includes the valley and the surrounding mountains.

== Geology ==
Map of the region showing the Albertine Rift to the west

The Albertine Rift and the mountains are the result of tectonic movements that are gradually splitting the Somali Plate away from the rest of the African continent. The mountains surrounding the rift are composed of uplifted Pre-Cambrian basement rocks, overlaid in parts by recent volcanic rocks.

== Lakes and rivers ==
The northern part of the rift is crossed by two large mountain ranges, the Rwenzori Mountains between Lake Albert and Lake Rutanzige (formerly Lake Edward) and the Virunga Mountains between Lake Rutanzige and Lake Kivu. The Virungas form a barrier between the Nile Basin to the north and east and the Congo Basin to the west and south. Lake Rutenzige is fed by several large rivers, the Rutshuru River being one, and drains to the north through the Semliki River into Lake Albert. The Victoria Nile flows from Lake Victoria into the northern end of Lake Albert and exits as the White Nile from a point slightly to the west, flowing north to the Mediterranean.

South of the Virunga, Lake Kivu drains to the south into Lake Tanganyika through the Ruzizi River. Lake Tanganyika then drains into the Congo River via the Lukuga River. It seems likely that the present hydrological system was established quite recently when the Virunga volcanoes erupted and blocked the northward flow of water from Lake Kivu into Lake Edward, causing it instead to discharge southward into Lake Tanganyika. Before that Lake Tanganyika, or separate sub-basins in what is now the lake, may have had no outlet other than evaporation. The Lukuga has formed relatively recently, providing a route through which aquatic species of the Congo Basin could colonize Lake Tanganyika, which formerly had distinct fauna.

== Mountains ==
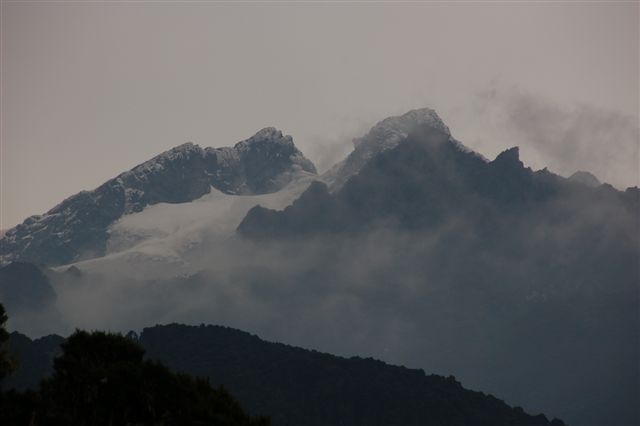
Mount Stanley in the Rwenzori range. With an elevation of 5,109 m (16,763 ft), it is the tallest mountain in the Albertine Rift and the third tallest in Africa.

From north to south the mountains include the Lendu Plateau, Rwenzori Mountains, Virunga Mountains and Itombwe Mountains. The Ruwenzori mountains have been identified with Ptolemy's "Mountains of the Moon". The range covers an area 120 km (75 mi) long by 65 km (40 mi) wide. This range includes Mount Stanley 5,119 m (16,795 ft), Mount Speke 4,890 m (16,040 ft) and Mount Baker 4,843 m (15,889 ft). The Virunga Massif along the border between Rwanda and the DRC consists of eight volcanoes. Two of these, Nyamuragira and Nyiragongo, are still highly active.

Isolated mountain blocks further to the south include Mount Bururi in southern Burundi, the Kungwe-Mahale Mountains in western Tanzania, and Mount Kabobo and the Marungu Mountains in the DRC on the shores of Lake Tanganyika. Most of the massifs rise to between 2,000 m (6,600 ft) and 3,500 m (11,500 ft).

== Ecology ==
The Albertine Rift montane forests are important eco-regions. Transitional forests, intermediate between lowland and montane forest, are found at elevations from around 1,000 m (3,300 ft) to 1,750 m (5,740 ft). Montane forest covers the slopes from around 1,600 m (5,200 ft) to 3,500 m (11,500 ft). Above 2,400 m (7,900 ft) there are areas of bamboo and elfin forest. Heather and grasses predominate above 3,500 m (11,500 ft). The ecology is threatened by deforestation as a growing population seeks new farmland. Illegal timber extraction is another problem, and artisanal gold mining causes some local damage.

== See also ==
- Mukura Forest Reserve
- Budongo Conservation Field Station

== Sources ==
- Birdlife. "Albertine Rift mountains". Birdlife International. Archived from the original on 2012-06-04.
- Clark, John Desmond (1969). Kalambo Falls prehistoric site, Volume 1. CUP Archive.
- Erfurt-Cooper, Patricia; Cooper, Malcolm (2010). Volcano and Geothermal Tourism: Sustainable Geo-Resources for Leisure and Recreation. Earthscan. ISBN 978-1-84407-870-7.
- Hughes, R. H.; Hughes, J. S. (1992). A directory of African wetlands. IUCN. ISBN 2-88032-949-3.
- Owiunji, I.; Plumptre, A.J. (2011). "The importance of cloud forest sites in the conservation of endemic and threatened species of the Albertine Rift". Tropical Montane Cloud Forests: Science for Conservation and Management. Cambridge University Press. ISBN 978-0521760355.
