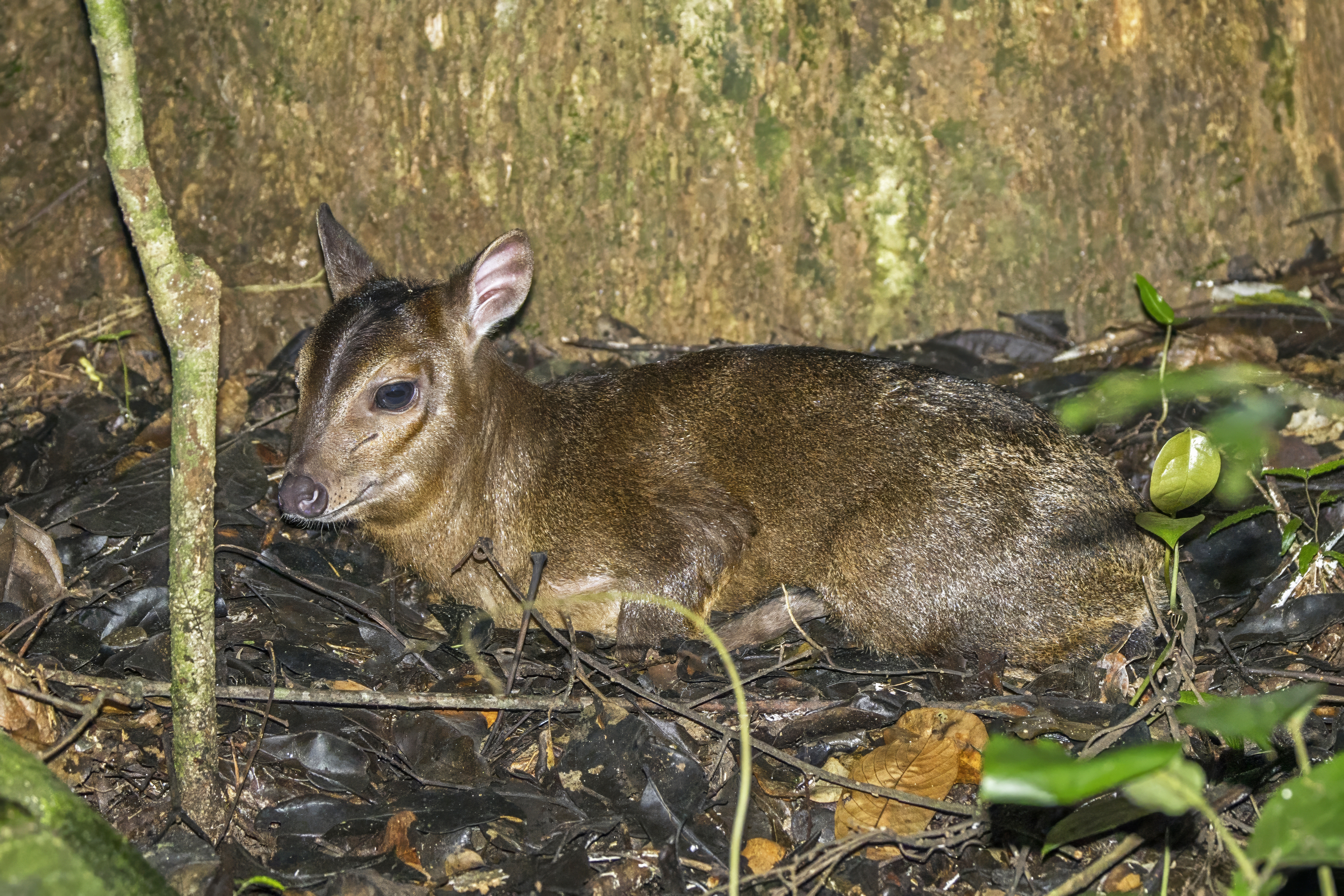
- Philantomba maxwellii maxwellii Ankasa Forest Reserve, Ghana

Conservation status
- Least Concern (IUCN 3.1)
- CITES Appendix II (CITES)

Scientific classification
- Kingdom: Animalia
- Phylum: Chordata
- Class: Mammalia
- Order: Artiodactyla
- Family: Bovidae
- Genus: Philantomba
- Species: P. maxwellii

Binomial name
- Philantomba maxwellii (C. H. Smith, 1827)
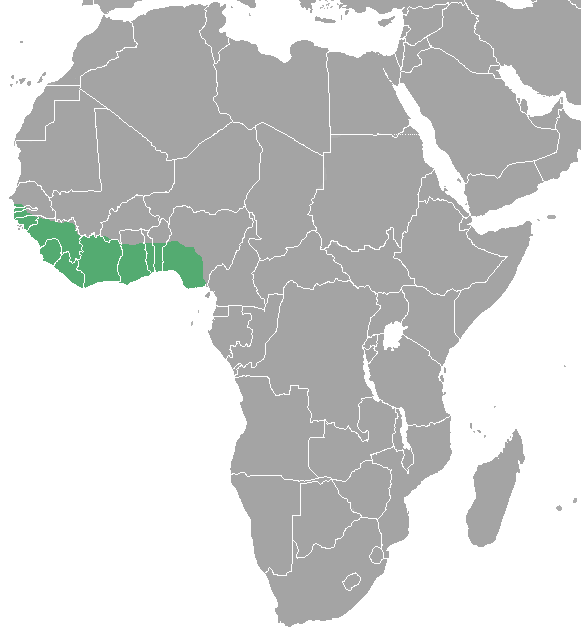
- The range map of Maxwell's duiker

Synonyms
- Cephalophus maxwellii Hamilton Smith, 1827; Antilope philantomba C. H. Smith, 1827; Antilope maxwellii C. H. Smith, 1827

= Maxwell's duiker =

Species of mammal

The Maxwell's duiker (Philantomba maxwellii) is a small antelope found in western Africa.

== Taxonomy ==
- Philantomba
  - Blue duiker
  - - Maxwell's duiker
    - Walter's duiker

Phylogenetic relationships of Maxwell's duiker, including Walter's duiker

The scientific name of Maxwell's duiker is Philantomba maxwelli. It is classified in the genus Philantomba along with the blue duiker (P. monticola) and Walter's duiker (P. walteri). It was first described by English naturalist Charles Hamilton Smith in 1827. The species is sometimes treated as a species of Cephalophus, another genus of duikers, although Philantomba has been recognised as a genus by zoologists such as Peter Grubb and Colin Groves. Theodor Haltenorth has considered this species to be a race of the blue duiker due to their identical features.

In 2012, Anne R. Johnston (of the University of Orleans) and colleagues constructed a cladogram of the subfamily Cephalophinae (duiker), that includes the three genera Cephalophus, Philantomba and Sylvicapra, based on mitochondrial analysis. Philantomba was shown to be monophyletic. It is sister to the rest of the subfamily, from which it diverged nearly 8.73 million years ago (in the late Miocene). Maxwell's duiker split from blue duiker 2.68 to 5.31 million years ago. This cladogram, however, did not include the newly discovered Walter's duiker. Marc Colyn (of the University of Rennes 1) and colleagues, who had discovered this species in 2010, had prepared a similar cladogram that included it.

Three subspecies are identified:

- P. m. danei or P. m. lowei Hinton, 1920 Occurs in Sierra Leone.
- P. m. maxwelli C. H. Smith, 1827 Occurs in Senegal, Gambia and Sierra Leone.
- P. m. liberiensis Hinton, 1920 Occurs in Liberia, Ghana and further East

== Description ==
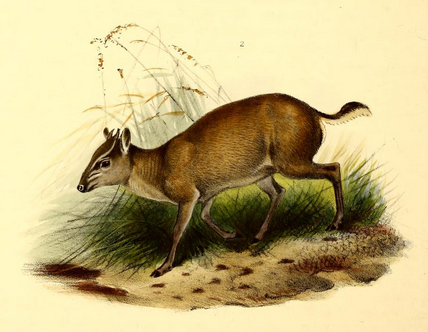
An illustration of Maxwell's duiker from The Book of Antelopes (1894)

Maxwell's duiker is a small antelope, as are the others in its genus. It is characterised by a slightly elevated back, short legs, a small head and short, round ears. According to measurements by Haltenorth, the head-and-body length is typically between 63 and 100 centimetres (25 and 39 in), and between 55 and 90 centimetres (22 and 35 in) excluding the head. It reaches 35–38 centimetres (14–15 in) at the shoulder, and weighs around 8–10 kilograms (18–22 lb). The tail, 8–10 centimetres (3.1–3.9 in) long, is bushy and lined with white. The species exhibits sexual dimorphism, as the females are slightly larger than the males. The coat is grayish brown, sometimes with a bluish tinge; the colour varies with individuals. A short tuft of hair circles the base of the horns and covers the area between them. The underbelly, in contrast with the dorsal parts, is generally white. Four teats are present.

Males, and sometimes females, possess straight, short, spiky horns. Heavily ringed and thick at the base, these measure 3.5–6 centimetres (1.4–2.4 in) in length. The length of the horns of the subspecies P. m. maxwelli rises from east to west, though this is not apparent in Ghana and the longest horns are observed in the western extremes of the range. The proportion of horned females reduces sharply from 100 percent in Nigeria and Togo to 5 out of 80 in Liberia. P. m. libriensis females generally lack horns; in populations where female grow horns, the males are observed to have longer horns. The broad skull, with a narrow, bare muzzle, is nearly 12.7 centimetres (5.0 in) long and 6.4 centimetres (2.5 in) wide. In P. m. maxwelli, the skull measurements tend to increase from east to west between Togo and Liberia, though this trend is not observed in the eastern and western extremes of the range.

The blue duiker bears a striking resemblance to Maxwell's duiker. However, the latter is nearly twice as large and heavier as the former, with a larger skull. While colouration is more uniform in Maxwell's duiker, the blue duiker shows two different colourations - there is a marked transition from the dorsal parts and the flanks to the rump. Another point of difference is the pedal gland (in the hooves), which has a simpler opening in the blue duiker.

== Habitat and distribution ==
The Maxwell duiker prefers areas with fresh and dense growth of shrubs and other plants. It inhabits the warm, moist lowland forests prevalent in western African countries such as Benin, Burkina Faso, Côte d'Ivoire, Ghana, Guinea, Guinea-Bissau, Liberia, Nigeria, Senegal, Sierra Leone and Togo. The habitat also includes forest fringes, secondary, scrub and gallery forests and farmlands. The western limits of the range lie in southwestern Senegal and western Gambia, from where it extends as far east as the Cross River in Nigeria.

== Diet ==
The Maxwell duiker's diet mostly consists of fruits, seeds, secondary vegetation and shrubs. Maxwell's duiker and other duikers present in the same geographical area were found to have similar diets. Diets are subject to seasonal changes, with a shift towards vegetation and parts of flowers at the beginning of winter.

The animal's small size is reflected in its food choices. Due to its smaller mouth, body anatomy, and masseter muscle, it tends to concentrate on food items up to 3 cm in diameter, while larger species eat items up to 6 cm in diameter.

== Behavior ==
Maxwell's duiker has a preorbital gland known to be used for marking objects and members of the same species, especially by dominant males. It was one of the first animals observed using its preorbital gland for scent marking. It was shown that scent marking is also associated with individual recognition or social appeasement as male and females will often press these glands together on both sides of each other's faces.

== Reproduction and lifespan ==
Calves are born mainly during the two dry seasons in Africa. Females birth a single calf once per year, after a gestation period of 120 days. Offspring usually weigh around 1/10 the weight of their mother and are similar in color to calves from other duiker species. Maxwell's duikers can survive up to 10 years in captivity.

== Threats and conservation ==
Maxwell's duiker is listed as Least Concern, though with the population trend decreasing, by the International Union for Conservation of Nature and Natural Resources (IUCN).
