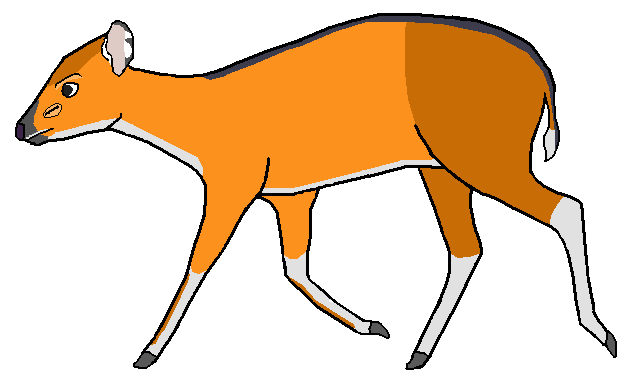

Conservation status
- Near Threatened (IUCN 3.1)

Scientific classification
- Kingdom: Animalia
- Phylum: Chordata
- Class: Mammalia
- Order: Artiodactyla
- Family: Bovidae
- Subfamily: Antilopinae
- Genus: Cephalophorus
- Species: C. ogilbyi
- Subspecies: C. o. crusalbum

Trinomial name
- Cephalophorus ogilbyi crusalbum (Grubb, 1978)

= White-legged duiker =

Species of mammal

The white-legged duiker (Cephalophorus ogilbyi crusalbum) is a medium-sized antelope subspecies from the duiker tribe (Cephalophini) within the family of bovids (Bovidae). It is native to Gabon and the Republic of the Congo. It was described as subspecies of the Ogilby's duiker (Cephalophus ogilbyi) by Peter Grubb in 1978. After a revision of the ungulates in 2011 by Colin Groves, some taxonomists regard it as a distinct species. Others, like the IUCN, maintain this species as a subspecies of C. ogilbyi.

== Description ==
The head-body length is usually 96.5 to 104.1 cm (38.0 to 41.0 in), but two collected specimens had lengths of 145 cm (57 in). The tail length is between 13 and 16 cm (5.1 and 6.3 in) and the weight is about 20 kg (44 lb). The coat is golden brown. The hindquarters and the rump are darker than the flanks. The neck, the forequarters and the belly are grey. A black broad dorsal stripe is 2.5 to 6 cm (0.98 to 2.36 in) in width. It runs from the shoulders to the rump, where it narrowed to 1 cm and extended to the tail tip. Aside from the black middle stripe, the upperside of the tail is golden brown. The underside of the tail has distinctly longer white hairs, and the end of the tail consists of a small tuft of about 7.5 cm (3.0 in) long golden brown hairs. All four legs are relatively long, with distinct white hairs below the carpus and the tarsus. The throat and the lower jaw are white. The head is grey with a darker brown forehead and a black muzzle. A bright chestnut-coloured arch runs over both eyes. The coronal tufts between the eyes are dark chestnut-coloured. The ears have sparse black hairs on the outer sides. On the surface of the innerside of the ears are distinct white hairs. Both sexes have horns; lengths of 8.7 to 10.9 cm (3.4 to 4.3 in) were measured for the males, and about 5 cm (2.0 in) for the females. The dental formula is I 0/3-C 0/1-P 3/3-M 3/3 (× 2) = 32 in total.
