= Kivu duiker =

Scientific classification
- Kingdom: Animalia
- Phylum: Chordata
- Class: Mammalia
- Order: Artiodactyla
- Family: Bovidae
- Subfamily: Antilopinae
- Genus: Cephalophorus
- Species: C. kivuensis

Binomial name
- Cephalophorus kivuensis (Lönnberg, 1919)

Species of mammal

The Kivu duiker is a species of antilopine mammal. It has formerly been regarded as a subspecies of the black-fronted duiker.
