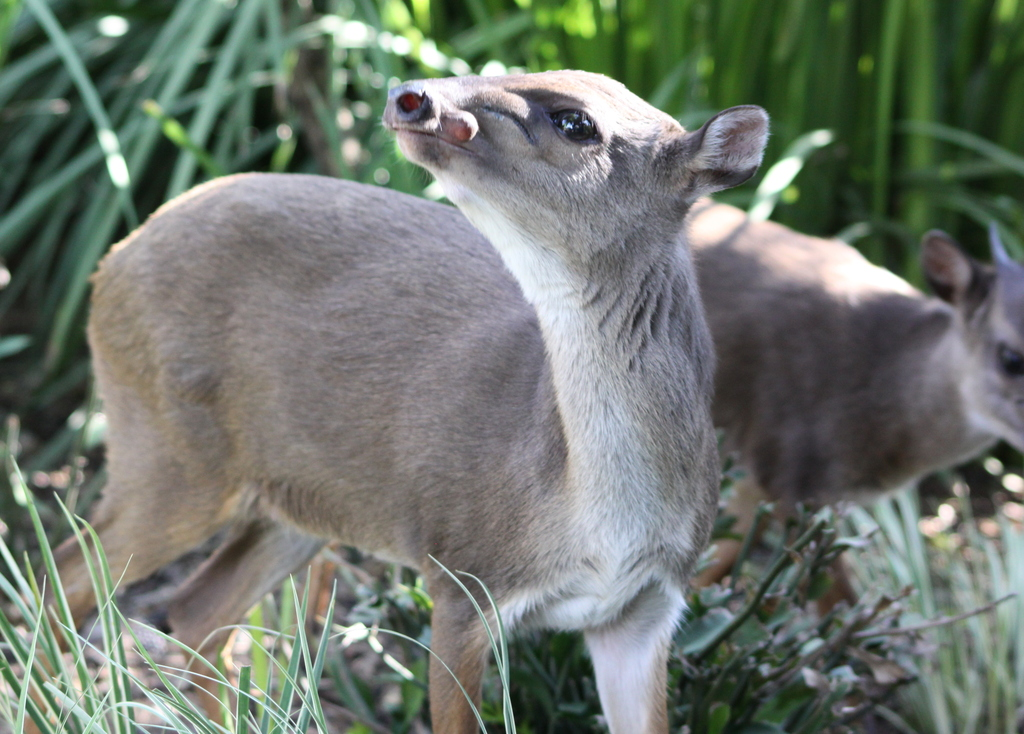

Conservation status
- Least Concern (IUCN 3.1)
- CITES Appendix II

Scientific classification
- Kingdom: Animalia
- Phylum: Chordata
- Class: Mammalia
- Order: Artiodactyla
- Family: Bovidae
- Genus: Philantomba
- Species: P. monticola

Binomial name
- Philantomba monticola (Thunberg, 1789)
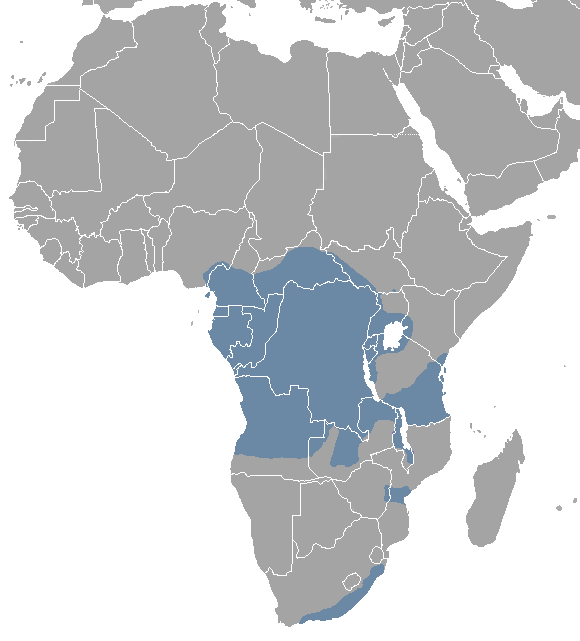
- Distribution map of Blue duiker

Synonyms
- Cephalophus monticola Thunberg, 1789

= Blue duiker =

Species of mammal

The blue duiker (Philantomba monticola) is a small antelope found in central, southern and eastern Africa. It is the smallest species of duiker. The species was first described by Swedish naturalist Carl Peter Thunberg in 1789. 12 subspecies are identified. The blue duiker reaches 32–41 centimetres (13–16 in) at the shoulder and weighs 3.5–9 kilograms (7.7–19.8 lb). Sexually dimorphic, the females are slightly larger than the males. The dark tail measures slightly above 10 centimetres (3.9 in). It has short, spiky horns, around 5 centimetres (2.0 in) long and hidden in hair tufts. The subspecies show a great degree of variation in their colouration. The blue duiker bears a significant resemblance to Maxwell's duiker.

Activity is diurnal (limited to daytime). Secretive and cautious, the blue duiker confines itself to the forest fringes. Territorial, individuals of opposite sexes form pairs and occupy territories, nearly 0.4–0.8 hectares (0.0015–0.0031 sq mi) large and marked by preorbital gland secretions. The blue duiker feeds on fallen fruits, foliage, flowers and pieces of bark, provided mainly by the forest canopies in their habitat. The age when sexual maturity is gained has been given differently by different studies. The species is monogamous, with pairs remaining together throughout the year. The length of the gestational period has been estimated from as little as four months to as long as seven months. Births occur throughout the year, though the birth rate might fall in the dry season. The calf is mainly kept in hiding and weaning occurs at 2.5 to 3 months.

The habitat consists of a variety of forests, including old-growth, secondary, and gallery forests. Forests are preferred as these provide the animal with shelter through the dense understory and forage through the canopy. Though categorized as Least Concern by the International Union for Conservation of Nature and Natural Resources (IUCN), the blue duiker is under threat from extensive bushmeat hunting across its range.

== Taxonomy and etymology ==
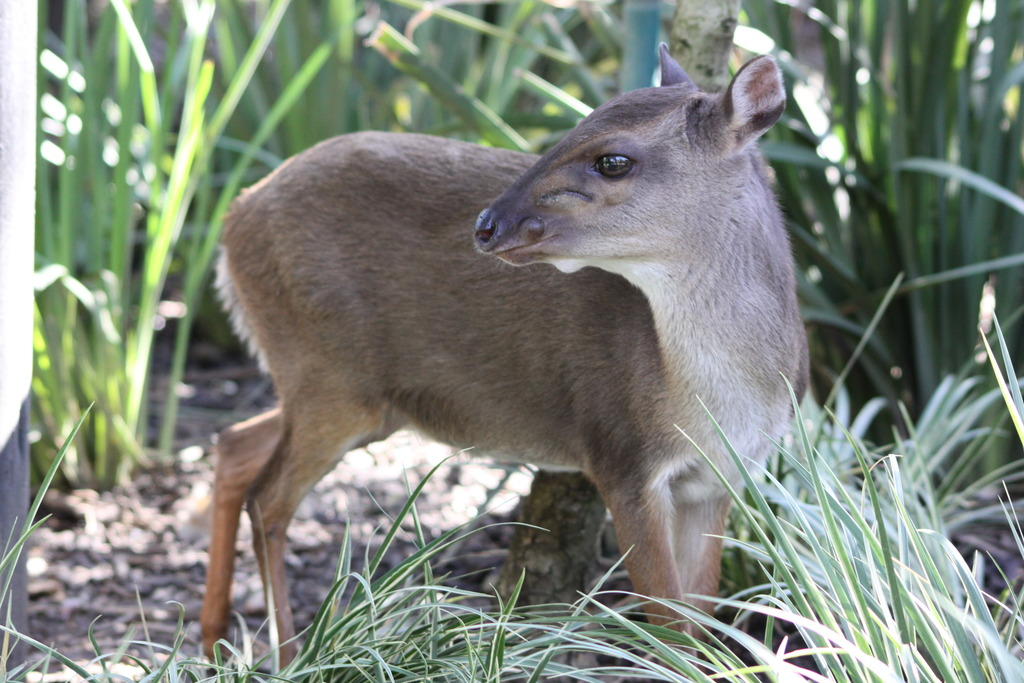
A blue duiker

The scientific name of the blue duiker is Philantomba monticola. It is placed in the genus Philantomba, along with Maxwell's duiker (P. maxwelli) and Walter's duiker (P. walteri), and the family Bovidae. The species was first described by Swedish naturalist Carl Peter Thunberg in 1789. It is sometimes treated as a species of Cephalophus, another genus of duikers, although Philantomba has been recognised as a genus by zoologists such as Peter Grubb and Colin Groves. Owing to the remarkable similarities between the two species, some zoologists such as Theodor Haltenorth consider Maxwell's duiker as a race of the blue duiker.

While the generic name Philantomba has no clear origin, the specific name monticola has been derived from the Latin words montis (mountain) and colo (meaning "I cultivate" or "I inhabit"), in reference to its montane habitat. The common name "blue" refers to one of its typical coat colours. The common name of duiker comes from the Afrikaans duik or Dutch duiker – both mean "diver", which refers to the practice of the animals to frequently dive into vegetation for cover.

In 2012, Anne R. Johnston (of the University of Orleans) and colleagues constructed a cladogram of the subfamily Cephalophinae (duiker), that includes the three genera Cephalophus, Philantomba and Sylvicapra, based on mitochondrial analysis. Philantomba was shown to be monophyletic. It is sister to the rest of the subfamily, from which it diverged nearly 8.73 million years ago (in the late Miocene). The blue duiker split from Maxwell's duiker 2.68 to 5.31 million years ago. This cladogram, however, did not include the newly discovered Walter's duiker. Marc Colyn (of the University of Rennes 1) and colleagues, who had discovered this species in 2010, had prepared a similar cladogram (below) that included it.

- - Cephalophus
  - Philantomba
    - Blue duiker (P. monticola)
    - - Maxwell's duiker (P. maxwelli)
      - Walter's duiker (P. walteri)

=== Subspecies ===
As many as 16 subspecies of the blue duiker have been proposed. In 1997, Jonathan Kingdon demarcated seven major populations of the species. In 2001, Groves and Grubb identified the following subspecies, bifurcating them into two groups on the basis of their colouration and geographical occurrence:

The grey-legged or northern subspecies

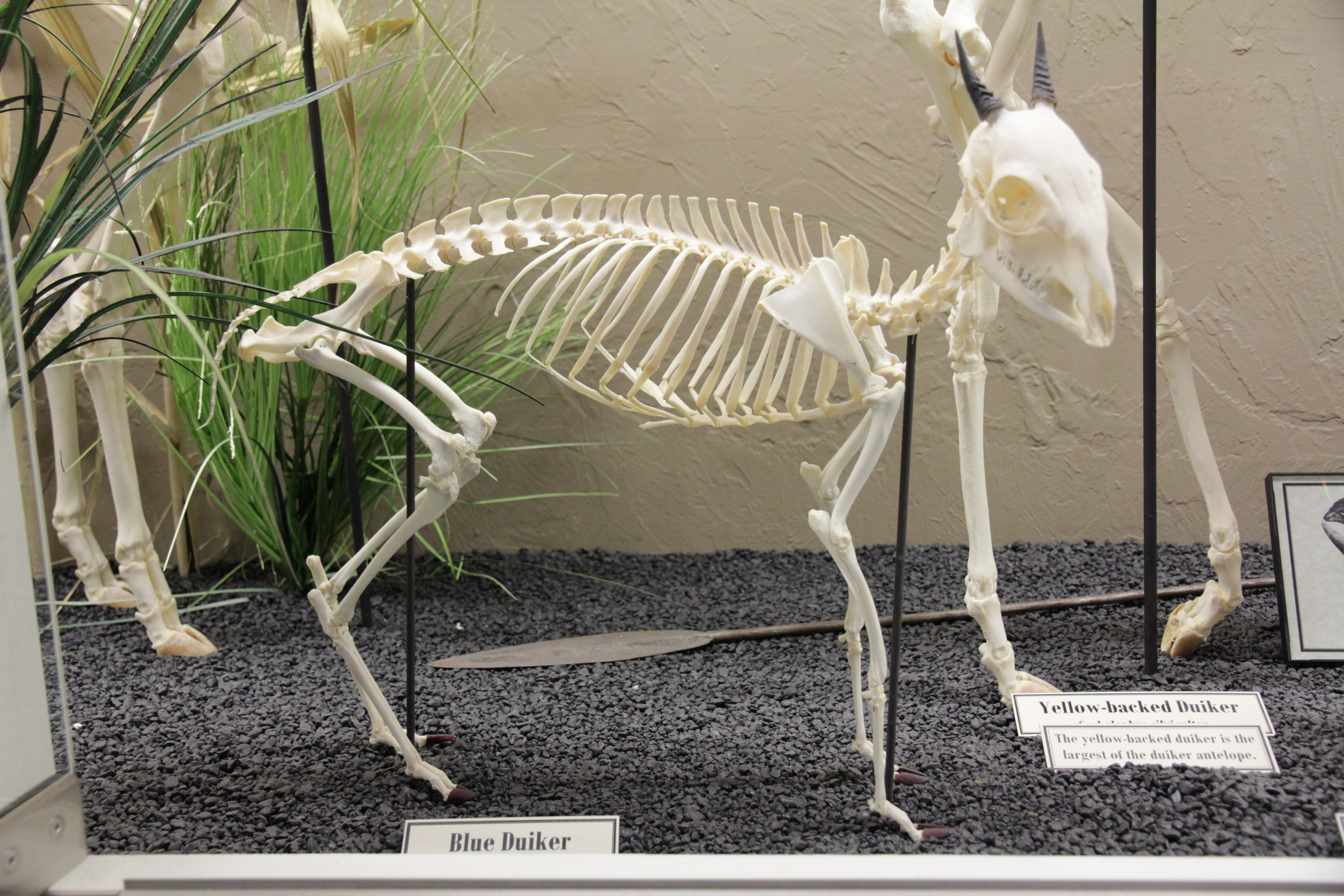
- Blue duiker skeleon (Museum of Osteology)
  P. m. aequatorialis (Matschie, 1892) – The range, bounded by the Congo River on the west, extends from the Democratic Republic of Congo into Uganda, and up to the Nile River. It is also found to the northeast of the Imatong Mountains (South Sudan).
- P. m. congicus (Lönnberg, 1908) – The range extends from the east of the Cross River across the Ubangi River to the Congo River, till Lisala (Democratic Republic of Congo). It is also found north of the mouth of the Congo River and in Cameroon and Gabon.
- P. m. lugens (Thomas, 1898) – The range extends from the Southern Highlands of Tanzania till the Malawi border, though it may occur in the Nyika Plateau in northern Malawi.
- P. m. melanorheus (Gray, 1846) – The type locality is Bioko, Equatorial Guinea.
- P. m. musculoides (Heller, 1913) – Occurs in eastern Ugandan and Kenyan forests. The range extends as far east as the East African Rift.
- P. m. sundevalli (Fitzinger, 1869) – It occurs in the eastern African coast, and on the islands of Mafia, Pemba and Zanzibar.

The red-legged or southern subspecies

- P. m. anchietae (Bocage, 1879) – The type locality is northern Angola.
- P. m. bicolor (Gray, 1863) – The range extends from Zanzibar to the KwaZulu Natal region in South Africa.
- P. m. defriesi (W. Rothschild, 1904) – The type locality is to the west of the steep cliffs in the Muchinga Province (Zambia).
- P. m. hecki (Matschie, 1897) – Occurs in Malawi, east of the valley of the Luangwa River (Zambia) and northern Mozambique.
- P. m. monticola (Thunberg, 1789) – Occurs in the Eastern Cape and Western Cape provinces of South Africa.
- P. m. simpsoni (Thomas, 1910) – Occurs between the lower Congo River and its tributary Kasai River.

== Description ==
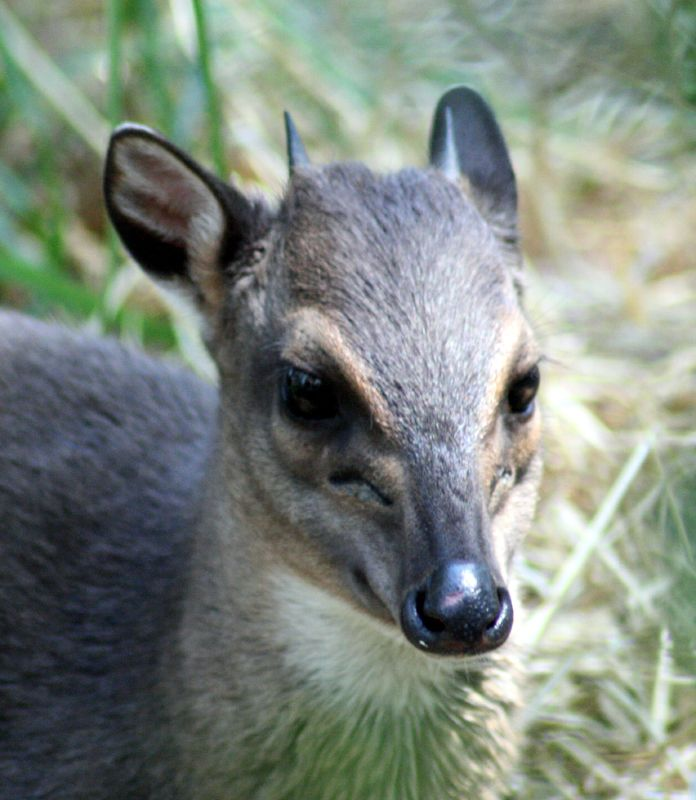
A close view of a blue duiker

The blue duiker is a small antelope; in fact, it is the smallest duiker. The head-and-body length is typically between 55 and 90 centimetres (22 and 35 in). It reaches 32–41 centimetres (13–16 in) at the shoulder and weighs nearly 3.5–9 kilograms (7.7–19.8 lb). P. m. anchietae is the largest subspecies. Sexually dimorphic, the females are slightly larger than the males. The blue duiker is characterised by a flat forehead, large eyes, small ears with a line of white, large nostrils, a broad mouth and agile lips. The dark tail measures slightly above 10 centimetres (3.9 in). A remarkable feature of the tail is the row of white crinkly hairs on either flank that reflect light efficiently, so that when the animal moves its tail up and down, it looks like a luminous signal in the dark habitat. The duiker has short, spiky horns, around 5 centimetres (2.0 in) long and hidden in hair tufts. A row of minute pores surrounded by a few hairs in the preorbital glands (near the eyes) secrete an opaque liquid consisting of 45 volatile compounds. The pedal glands (near the hooves) produce a pungent, whitish fluid.

The subspecies show a great degree of variation in their coloration. The coat can be a shade of blue, grey or brown, and even black. The grey-legged northern subspecies show a grey to brown coloration, with a posterior stripe that marks a transition from the rump to the buttocks. P. m. congicus has a bright grey to black back, with dull grey flanks; a dark brown stripe marks the shift from the black rump to the lighter buttocks. P. m. sundevalli is similar, though the difference between the flanks and the rump is less notable. P. m. aequatorialis is paler and browner than P. m. congicus with a less sharp transition. The stripe is fainter and the back darker in P. m. musculoides. P. m. lugens can be told apart from its darker coloration; the flanks and the dorsal parts are dark grey to brown, the underside grey and a black rump. The diminutive P. m. melanorheus stands apart as well, with black dorsal parts, pinkish grey sides, and long thick fur.

Comparison between the similar species

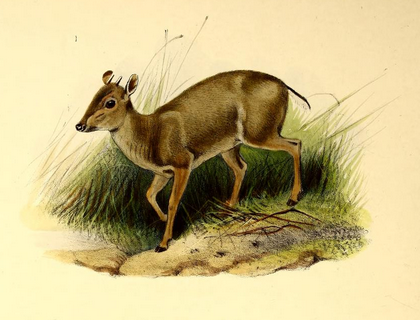
Blue duiker

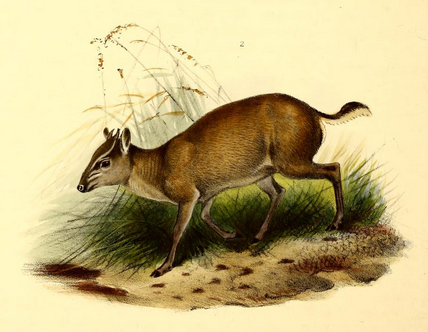
Maxwell's duiker

The southern subspecies, on the other hand, have reddish tan legs and reddish coats. P. m. hecki is a light fawn to greyish black with light red flanks and a white underbelly; a change in tone can be observed as the rump is a darker reddish fawn. The paler P. m. defriensi is grey in the middle portion of the back, with red to fawn sides, and dark rump and tail. P. m. monticola, light grey to fawn with a reddish rump, is darker than P. m. bicolor, that has reddish-orange flanks. P. m. anchietae is a pale grey or brown on the back with white underparts and a black tail; there is a clear transition from the grey sides and anterior parts to the reddish rump. P. m. simpsoni is distinguished by a facial stripe with white ventral parts; the rump is redder than the flanks.

The blue duiker bears a significant resemblance to Maxwell's duiker. However, the latter is nearly twice as large and heavy as the former, with a larger skull. While coloration is more uniform in Maxwell's duiker, the blue duiker shows two different colorations. Another point of difference is the pedal gland (in the hooves), which has a simpler opening in the blue duiker. Walter's duiker is notably lighter in colour; the flanks are brown instead of grey.

== Ecology and behavior ==
The blue duiker is diurnal (active during the day). Secretive and cautious, it confines itself to the forest fringes. Territorial, individuals of opposite sexes form pairs and occupy territories, nearly 0.4–0.8 hectares (0.0015–0.0031 sq mi) large and marked by preorbital gland secretions. The animal rubs the preorbital glands on trees and logs to mark its territory with the fluid produced by the glands. A vocal bovid, bird-like chirps denote curiosity in the animal. It can let out yowls typical of cats if distressed. A female not in oestrus will avoid the male's advances, and may even let out a whistling call.

=== Diet ===
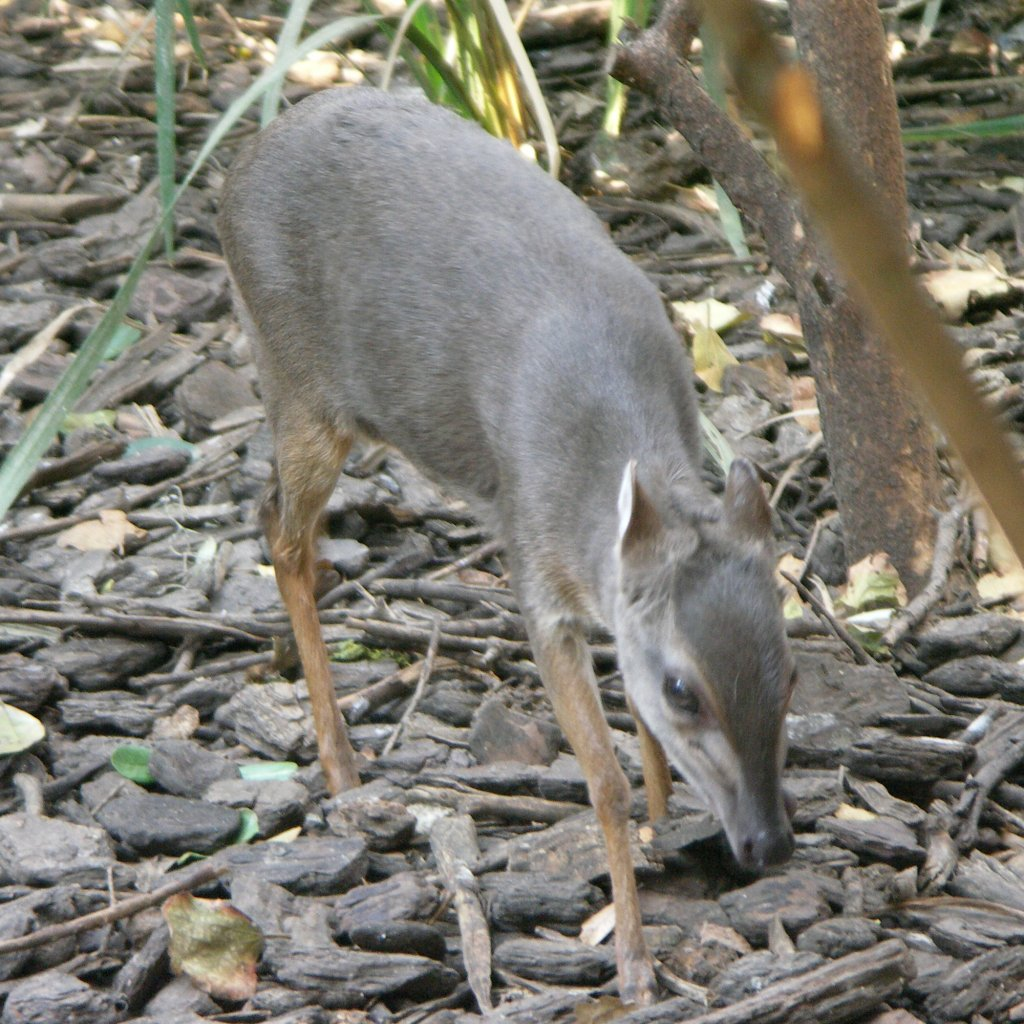
The blue duiker feeds on fallen fruits and foliage.

The diet consists of fallen fruits, foliage, flowers and pieces of bark, provided mainly by the forest canopies in their habitat. Fungi, resin, particularly exudates from Albizia species and animal matter such as ants (which are licked from the ground) may also be included in the diet. The blue duiker can sustain itself on dead foliage better than other duiker species. A 1990 study analysed 12 stomachs and determined the content of dicotyledonous leaves to be 70%, while fruits and seeds comprised 23% of the diets and fresh foliage was plenty and perennial. Fruits were, however, strongly preferred to foliage. In 2001, American zoologist Don E. Wilson observed 18 stomachs, and concluded that nearly three-fourths were occupied by fruits, browse took 15 percent of the volume, while fungi and flowers took 5 percent each. They may forage by tracking the movements of birds and monkeys.

=== Reproduction ===
The age when sexual maturity is gained has been given differently by different studies. Wilson observed that females become mature before 13 months, and the minimum age was found to be eight months. He noted that males take longer to mature, nearly 11 to 14 months. The species is monogamous, with pairs remaining together throughout the year. The length of the gestational period has been estimated from as short as four months to as long as seven months. The former estimate is supported by observations in the Ituri Rainforest (Democratic Republic of Congo). Births occur throughout the year, though the birth rate might fall in the dry season. The calf can start moving about on its own within 20 minutes of birth, and is nursed thrice a day. It is kept in hiding for most of the time. The nursing intervals become irregular towards weaning, which occurs at 2.5 to 3 months. Males visit their mates occasionally, though they disappear for about a month after the calf's birth to probably protect the calf. A postpartum oestrus occurs three to five days after the birth.

== Habitat and distribution ==
This species can survive in a variety of forests, including old-growth, secondary and gallery forests. Forests are preferred as these provide the animal with shelter through the dense understory and forage through canopy. They can also be found in pockets of degraded and regenerated forests from the sea level up to an altitude of 3,000 metres (9,800 ft). This duiker can be found in several countries in the western, southern and eastern parts of Africa: Angola, Cameroon, Central African Republic, The Democratic Republic of Congo, Equatorial Guinea, Gabon, Kenya, Malawi, Mozambique, Nigeria, Rwanda, South Africa, South Sudan, Tanzania, Uganda, Zambia and Zimbabwe.

== Threats and conservation ==
The blue duiker is categorized as Least Concern by the International Union for Conservation of Nature and Natural Resources (IUCN). It is listed in Appendix II of the Convention on International Trade in Endangered Species (CITES). While the population trend is reasonably stable, the blue duiker is threatened by extensive bushmeat hunting across its range. Human population growth in the regions the blue duiker inhabits, which intensifies hunting of the blue duiker by humans, has also been identified as a significant threat. Wilson claimed that the blue duiker has the greatest economic as well as ecological significance of any African ungulate. Blue duiker meat is an important source of nutrition in its range. However, the blue duiker can survive despite human interference in its habitat.

P. monticola occurs in the following protected areas across its range: Semuliki National Park (Uganda); Dja Faunal Reserve and Lobéké National Park (Cameroon); Dzanga-Sangha Special Reserve and Dzanga-Ndoki National Park (Central African Republic); Monte Alén National Park (Equatorial Guinea); Lopé National Park and Gamba (Gabon); Odzala, Nouabalé-Ndoki and Conkouati-Douli National Parks and Lake Tele region (Congo-Brazzaville); the Okapi Wildlife Reserve and Maiko, Kahuzi-Biéga and Salonga National Parks (Congo-Kinshasa); and numerous others in Southern Africa.
