= Mount Baker (Uganda) =

Mountain in Uganda

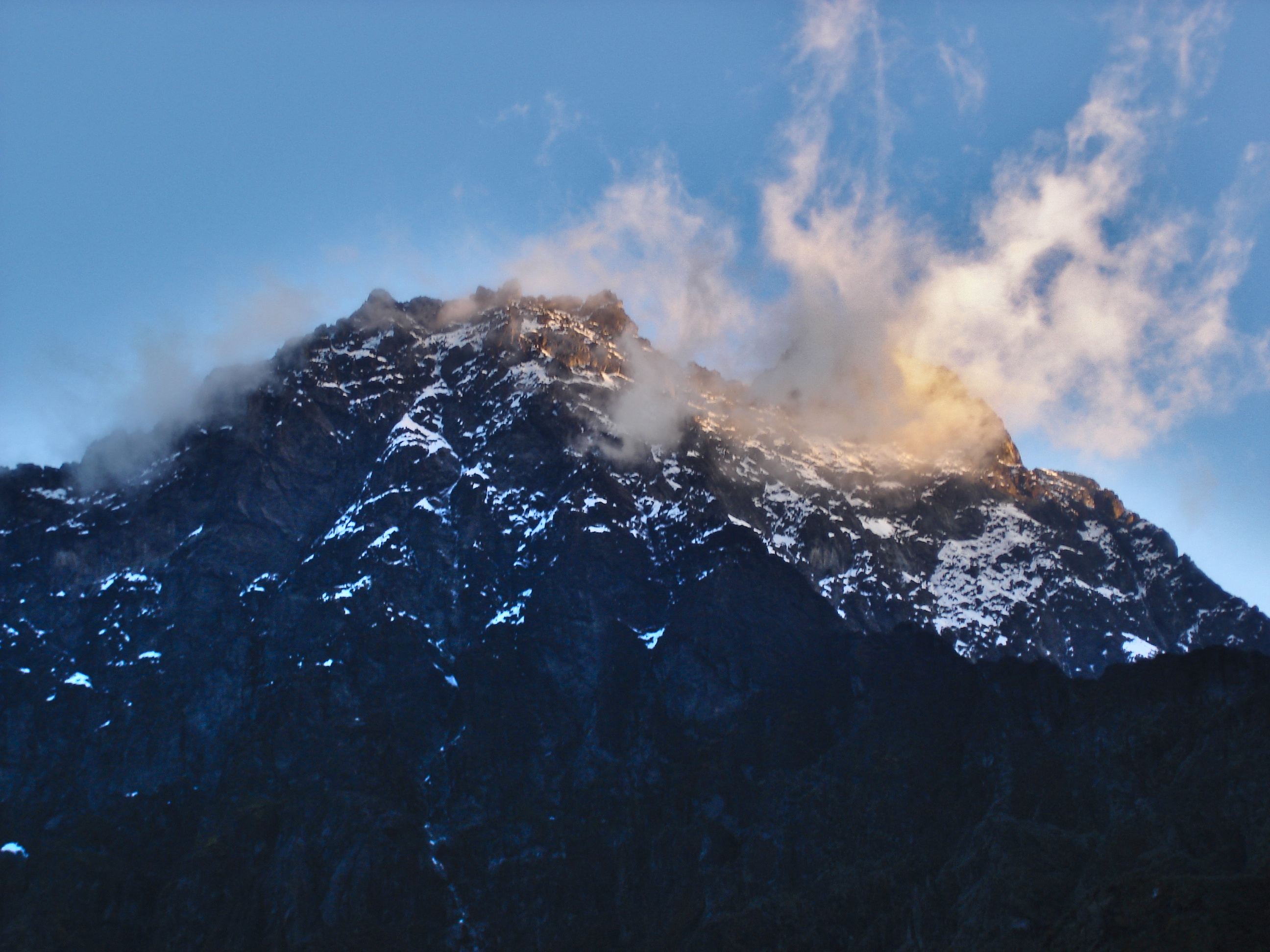
- Mount Baker seen from Bujuku hut.

Highest point
- Elevation: 4,844 m (15,892 ft)
- Prominence: 507 m (1,663 ft)
- Coordinates: 0°22′00″N 29°54′00″E

Geography
- Location within Uganda
- Location: Uganda
- Parent range: Rwenzori Mountains

Climbing
- First ascent: 10 June 1906 by Duke of the Abruzzi, Joseph Petigax, Cesar Ollier and Josef Brocherel

Mount Baker or Kiyanja is a mountain in the Rwenzori Mountains National Park in Uganda, 2.8 kilometres (1.7 mi) from the border with the Democratic Republic of the Congo. With a height of 4,844 metres (15,892 ft), it is the sixth-highest mountain in Africa. Together with Mount Stanley and Mount Speke, it forms a triangle enclosing the upper Bujuku Valley. The nearest peak is Mount Stanley, which is 2.26 kilometres (1.40 mi) to the west. The mountains lie within an area called "The Mountains of the Moon".

Like all peaks in the Ruwenzori Range, Mount Baker has multiple jagged peaks along a ridge. The highest is Edward Peak.

The ridge line of Mount Baker was first reached in January 1906 by the Austrian mountaineer Rudolf Grauer accompanied by two British missionaries, H. E. Maddox and H. W. Tegart. In February of that year and again in April, the same rocky point was reached by an English expedition, including Alexander F. R. Wollaston, Richard Bowen Woosnam, and Douglas Carruthers. The highest point of Mount Baker was finally climbed in June by an expedition led by the Duke of the Abruzzi, which climbed all peaks of the other five highest mountains of the Rwenzori, .

The Bakonjo name for the mountain seems to have been (and currently is) "Kiyanja". On his June 1891 expedition into the Ruwenzori, Franz Stuhlmann observed the peak and named it either "Semper" or "Ngemwimbi". Abruzzi renamed the mountain after Samuel Baker, a 19th-century British explorer who in 1864 was the first European to sight and visit Lake Albert, just northeast of the Ruwenzori Mountains, and who had reported to glimpse "great mountainous masses away in the distance, to the south of Lake Albert."
