= Walter's duiker =

Conservation status
- Data Deficient (IUCN 3.1)

Scientific classification
- Kingdom: Animalia
- Phylum: Chordata
- Class: Mammalia
- Order: Artiodactyla
- Family: Bovidae
- Subfamily: Antilopinae
- Genus: Philantomba
- Species: P. walteri

Binomial name
- Philantomba walteri Colyn, Hulselmans, Sonet, Oudé, de Winter, Natta, Nagy & E. Verheyen, 2010

Species of antelope

Walter's duiker (Philantomba walteri) is a species of duiker found in Togo, Benin and Nigeria. It was described in 2010. Its name commemorates Professor Walter Verheyen, who was the first to obtain a specimen of this species of duiker from Togo in 1968.

== Description ==
It measures under 40 cm (16 in) tall at the shoulder, and weighs between 4 and 6 kg (8.8 and 13.2 lb). It was described in 2010 following comparison of specimens in museum collections with those from bushmeat markets. It is a small antelope and is characterised by a slightly raised back, short legs, a small head and short, rounded ears. It has a long tail, pedal glands and a distinctive stripe above the eye. It is intermediate in size between the larger Maxwell's duiker (Philantomba maxwellii) and the smaller blue duiker (Philantomba monticola), but is clearly different in morphology, cranial structure and DNA analysis.

== Distribution and habitat ==
Walter's duiker was first recognised as a new species in 2010 when specimens of this duiker were found on sale at a bushmeat market. The duikers have not been observed by researchers in the wild (until Spring of 2021, via video cameras), but are believed to come from the Dahomey Gap, an area of savannah which is a portion of the Guinean forest-savanna mosaic with a relatively dry climate, that extends all the way to the coast in Benin, Togo and Ghana, separating the rainforest zones on either side.

== Status ==
As of 2016 the species is known from only forty-one specimens, and it has not been viewed in the wild. The International Union for Conservation of Nature considers the species too poorly known for it to be able to evaluate this animal's conservation status, so they have assessed it as being "data deficient".
