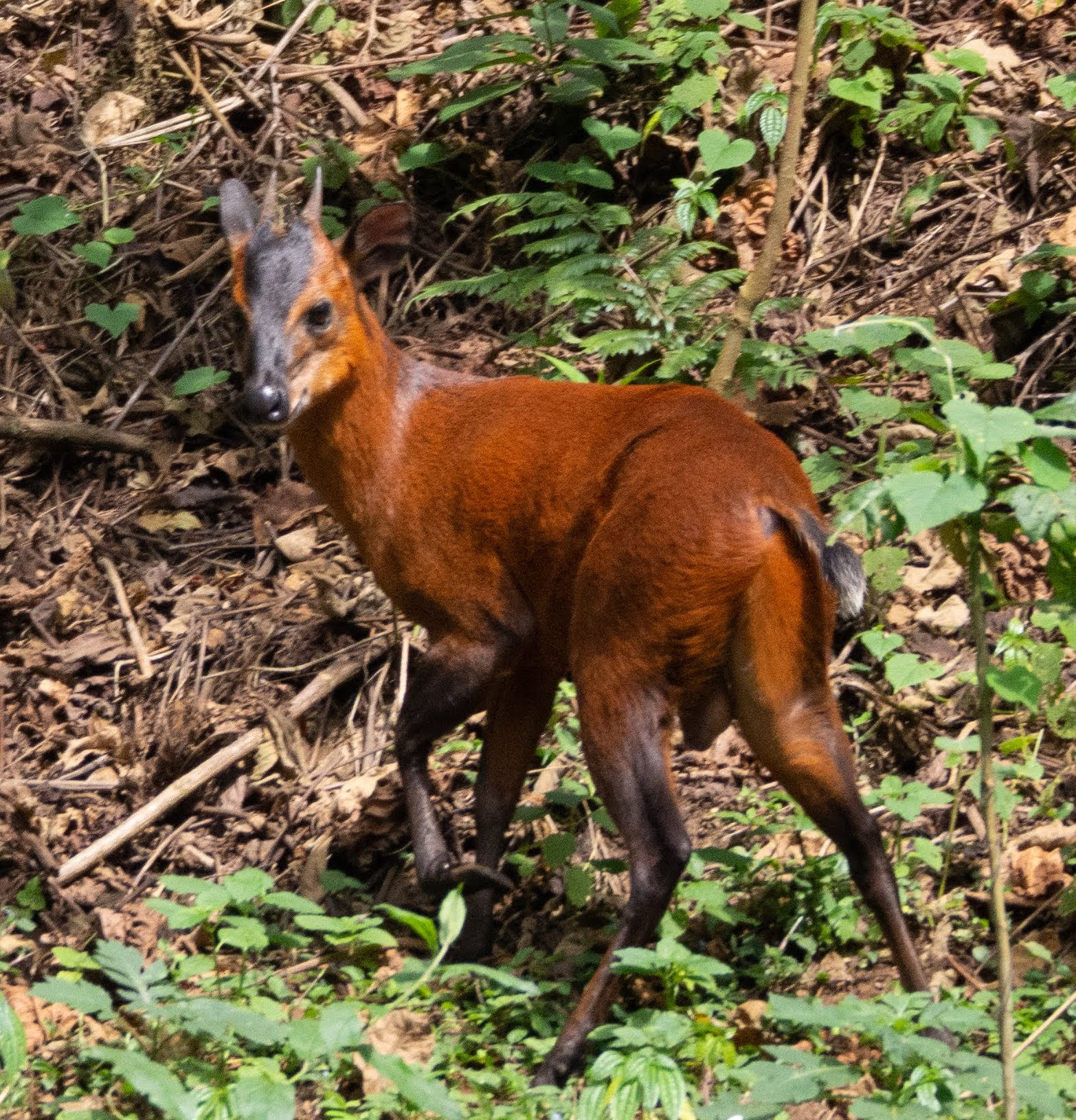
- in Bwindi Impenetrable National Park, Uganda

Conservation status
- Endangered (IUCN 3.1)

Scientific classification
- Kingdom: Animalia
- Phylum: Chordata
- Class: Mammalia
- Order: Artiodactyla
- Family: Bovidae
- Subfamily: Antilopinae
- Genus: Cephalophorus
- Species: C. rubidus

Binomial name
- Cephalophorus rubidus (Thomas, 1901)

Synonyms
- Cephalophus nigrifrons ssp. rubidus

= Ruwenzori duiker =

Species of mammal

The Ruwenzori duiker or Ruwenzori red duiker (Cephalophorus rubidus) is a stocky but small antelope found only in the Ruwenzori Mountains between Uganda and, probably, the Democratic Republic of Congo. While listed as a species, some consider it to be a subspecies of either the black-fronted duiker or the red-flanked duiker.

The Ruwenzori duiker weighs about 15 kg (33 lb) and has a shoulder height of about 45 cm (18 in). It has a rufous coat, lighter on its underbelly and darker on its back. Its short, prong-like horns are about 8 cm (3.1 in) long.

It is found in subalpine zones above 3,000 metres (9,800 ft), where it eats herbs. It is diurnal.
