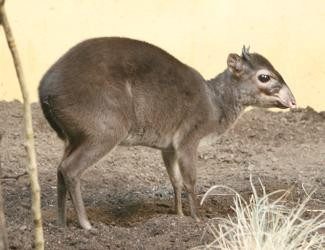
- Maxwell's duiker, the type species for Philantomba

Scientific classification
- Kingdom: Animalia
- Phylum: Chordata
- Class: Mammalia
- Order: Artiodactyla
- Family: Bovidae
- Subfamily: Antilopinae
- Tribe: Cephalophini
- Genus: Philantomba; Blyth, 1840

Type species
- Antilope philantomba Smith, 1827

Species
- P. maxwellii; P. monticola; P. walteri

= Philantomba =

Genus of mammals

Philantomba is a mammal genus which contains three species of duiker, a type of small antelope. The three species are Maxwell's duiker (Philantomba maxwellii), the blue duiker (Philantomba monticola) and Walter's duiker (Philantomba walteri).
