= British Museum Ruwenzori expeditions =

Three British expeditions to Equatorial Africa

The British Museum Ruwenzori expeditions took place in 1905–1906, 1934–1935 and during the summer of 1952. The three expeditions to the Ruwenzori were organised by the British Museum. The first, in 1905–1906, mainly operated in the lower part of the Mubuku valley, the 1934–1935 expedition focused on the eastern side of the massif and the expedition during the summer of 1952 was led with a geological focus.

== British Museum Ruwenzori expedition 1905–1906 ==
Henry Morton Stanley was the first European to recognise that the Ruwenzori was a snow covered range. Soon after the publication of his observations in 1888, a view developed amongst naturalists that "the isolated position and the great altitude attained by the forest-clad, snow-capped peaks, rising to nearly 17,000 feet, made it certain that a rich and peculiar fauna and flora must await the investigation of the explorer". William Robert Ogilvie-Grant, an ornithologist in the British Museum was keen to investigate this question and he organised the 1905-06 expedition and arranged the finances but was not a member of the field party. The object of the expedition was "to make collections of natural history specimens, and especially of birds and mammals".

The expedition left England on 5 October 1905, the overall field leader was Richard Bowen Woosnam (1880–1915 who was later killed in action during the Battle of Gallipoli). The other members were Gerald Legge (1882–1915 who was also later killed in action at Gallipoli, during the landing at Suvla Bay), Douglas Carruthers, Richard Edward Dent (b. 1882) and Sandy Wollaston, who at the age of 30 was the oldest member of the field party and was later a member of the 1921 British Everest expedition. Wollaston took on the role of medic, botanist and entomologist. It was "only a day or two before the expedition started" that he "heard for the first time of its existence, and that they were in need of a doctor", he approached Ogilvie-Grant at the British Museum, was accepted, and then had to make his own way to catch up with the rest of the party. Legge's father, William Legge, 6th Earl of Dartmouth, was one of the 'subscribers' whose financial backing supported the expense of the expedition.

They mainly operated in the lower part of the Mubuku valley up to about 6,000 ft (1,800 m) and on savannah county near Muhokya. An account of the botanical results of the expedition was published in 1908 and a comprehensive report on the zoological results was published in 1909. Numerous new species were collected including at least 23 new species of mammal, 24 new species of birds, 6 new species of moths, 47 new species of butterflies, 6 new species of molluscs and 34 new species of plants (and one new genus). Woosnam was awarded the Silver Medal (Zoological Society of London) for his role in leading the expedition.

The "British Museum had not considered the remote possibility of exploration in fitting out the Ruwenzori Expedition" but in February 1906 Wollaston, a member of the Alpine Club, along with Woosnam and Dent set off towards the upper slopes "the object of the expedition was primarily to collect specimens; Woosnam and Dent were in quest of birds and mammals, and I went to collect plants, but we had at the back of our minds the idea of getting up something if an opportunity should occur, and we accordingly took with us all the apparatus that we could collect. This consisted of about 25 feet of Alpine rope and a pair of crampons, which we had obtained from Herr Grauer, and an old ice-axe, which Mr. Freshfield had left behind him at Toro." After crossing a small glacier they summited a peak of c.15,285 ft (4,659 m) (now referred to as Wollaston Peak), a subsidiary top of Mount Baker.

== British Museum Ruwenzori expedition 1934–1935 ==
A British Museum botanical-entomological expedition to the eastern Ruwenzori took place from September 1934-March 1935. The joint leaders were Frederick Wallace Edwards (entomologist) and George Taylor (botanist), both employees of the British Museum. Other members of the expedition were David Roden Buxton, Patrick Synge, John Ford, E.G. Gibbins, T.H.E. Jackson and J.F. Shillito. Before taking part in the Ruwenzori expedition, Synge and Ford had both been members of the Oxford University Expedition to Sarawak in 1932.

The Ruwenzori expedition operated in two parties, one being active mainly in the Namwamba valley and the other mainly in the Nyamgasani valley. Short forays were also made to the Virunga Mountains, Mount Elgon and the Aberdare Range. The Kalinzu forest and Budongo Forest were also visited.

The French entomologist Aimée Fournier de Horrack contributed towards the expedition's costs. A general account of the expedition is given in Synges book Mountains of the Moon The reports on the material collected by the expedition were published by the British Museum between 1939 and 1957 in a special publication entitled the Ruwenzori Expedition 1934–1935 which comprised 3 volumes, with a total of 29 parts.

== British Museum Ruwenzori expedition 1952 ==
In the summer of 1952 the geologist William Quarrier Kennedy of Leeds University led the third expedition involving the British Museum in the Ruwenzori. The party included another British geologist, George P. L. Walker, and members of the Uganda Geological Survey. The British Museum was represented by three naturalists: Robert Ross (botanist), Gwilym O. Evans (zoologist) and David Stephen Fletcher (entomologist).

The geological aspects of the expedition involved a collaboration with a Belgian expedition which was visiting Ruwenzori at the same time. The zoological collecting was primarily focused on soil-fauna extracted from the soil, forest litter, moss and lichen samples.
