= Brooke's duiker =

Conservation status
- Vulnerable (IUCN 3.1)
- CITES Appendix II

Scientific classification
- Kingdom: Animalia
- Phylum: Chordata
- Class: Mammalia
- Order: Artiodactyla
- Family: Bovidae
- Subfamily: Antilopinae
- Genus: Cephalophorus
- Species: C. brookei

Binomial name
- Cephalophorus brookei (Thomas, 1903)

Synonyms
- Cephalophus ogilbyi brookei Thomas, 1903

Species of antelope

Brooke's duiker (Cephalophorus brookei) is a species of antelope. It is distributed throughout Liberia, Sierra Leone and Côte d'Ivoire. It was elevated to species status, though the IUCN still considers it to be a subspecies of Ogilby's duiker (C. ogilby).
