= Peter Grubb (zoologist) =

British zoologist

Peter Grubb (1942 – 23 December 2006) was a British zoologist. He often collaborated with Colin Groves and described several new mammal taxa including Felis margarita harrisoni (a subspecies of the sand cat), the Bornean yellow muntjac, the Nigerian white-throated guenon, Cephalophus nigrifrons hypoxanthus, the white-legged duiker, Cephalophus silvicultor curticeps, Cephalophus weynsi lestradei, the Kashmir musk deer, and the Niger Delta red colobus.

Grubb was born in Dumfries, Dumfriesshire, but moved to Ealing West London when he was a small child. His father William Grubb was a research chemist at the Imperial Chemical Industries and later worked as a science teacher in London. His mother Anne Sirutis was a school teacher from Lithuania. His younger sister Katrina is an artist.

After his BSc graduation in Zoology at the University College London Grubb was research assistant in the Wellcome Institute of the Zoological Society of London. In the 1960s he went to St Kilda for three years where he studied Soay sheep for his PhD thesis. For this work he received a special mention as runner-up for the Thomas Henry Huxley Award of the Zoological Society of London in 1968. In the same year he took part in the Royal Society expedition to Aldabra where he worked particularly on the Aldabra giant tortoises. Subsequently, he lectured at the University of Ghana for twelve years. His main research field was the taxonomy and distribution of African mammals.

In 1993 and 2005 he wrote the Artiodactyla and Perissodactyla sections for the publication Mammal Species of the World. He also contributed to Mammalian Species, the journal of the American Society of Mammalogists. He published checklists of West African mammals (for instance for Sierra Leone, Gambia, and Ghana) and wrote several revisions, including on warthogs, gerenuks and buffalo. In 1993 he co-edited the IUCN publication Pigs, Peccaries, and Hippos: Status Survey and Conservation Action Plan.

In 1977 botanist Francis Raymond Fosberg named the Portulaca variety Portulaca mauritiensis var. grubbii from Cosmoledo after Grubb which is now included in Portulaca mauritiensis var. aldabrensis.

In June 2006 he was honored with the Stamford Raffles Award of the Zoological Society of London.

After two surgeries Peter Grubb died from cancer in December 2006. He was married and had two children.
