= Mukura Forest Reserve =

Protected reserve in Rwanda

Coordinates: 01°59′S 29°30′E

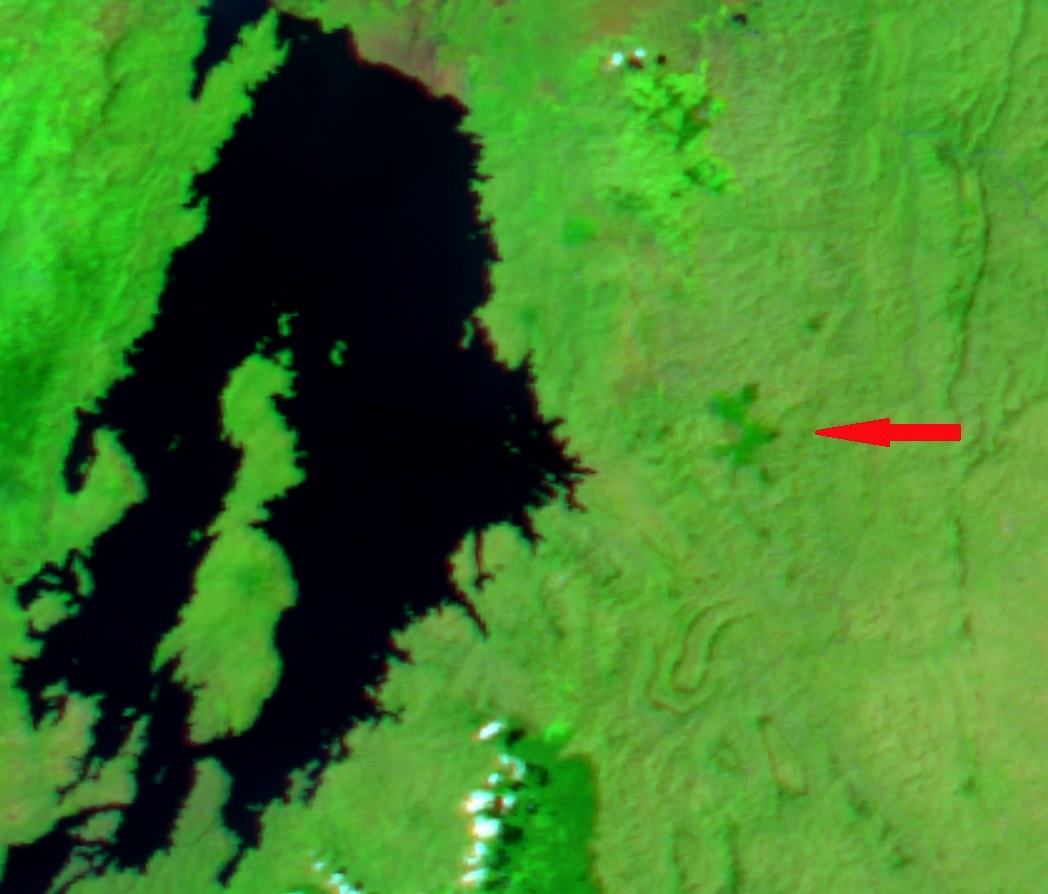
- Mukura Forest Reserve, east of Lake Kivu. Nyungwe National Park is visible below.
- Interactive map of Mukura Forest Reserve
- Location: Rwanda
- Established: 1951

The Mukura Forest Reserve is a protected reserve in the northwest part of Rwanda, covering about 16 km^{2}. It is situated in western Rwanda's Albertine Rift region, which lies in the Congo-Nile crest. Once part of a swath of mountain forest that extended all the way from Nyungwe to the Volcanoes National Park, the Mukura is now an isolated chunk of forest.

Mukura was designated a reserve in 1951, and originally covered an area of 30,000 ha. However, nearly half of the total forest cover and biodiversity has been lost since, leaving the forest with an area of only 16,000 ha. A host of factors have led to this decline, including a population density of nearly 600 people per km^{2} and a mean local household income of $3/month, the latter causing inhabitants to exploit the forest for financial solvency.

The average annual temperature of Mukura Forest is 15 °C. The forest rises to an average height of 2,600 meters above sea level, and receives 1,500 mm of rainfall annually.

The reserve has about 163 species of birds.
