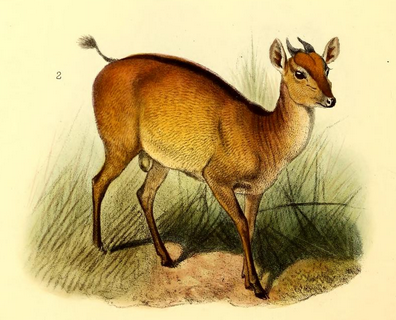

Conservation status
- Least Concern (IUCN 3.1)
- CITES Appendix II

Scientific classification
- Kingdom: Animalia
- Phylum: Chordata
- Class: Mammalia
- Order: Artiodactyla
- Family: Bovidae
- Subfamily: Antilopinae
- Genus: Cephalophorus
- Species: C. ogilbyi

Binomial name
- Cephalophorus ogilbyi (Waterhouse, 1838)
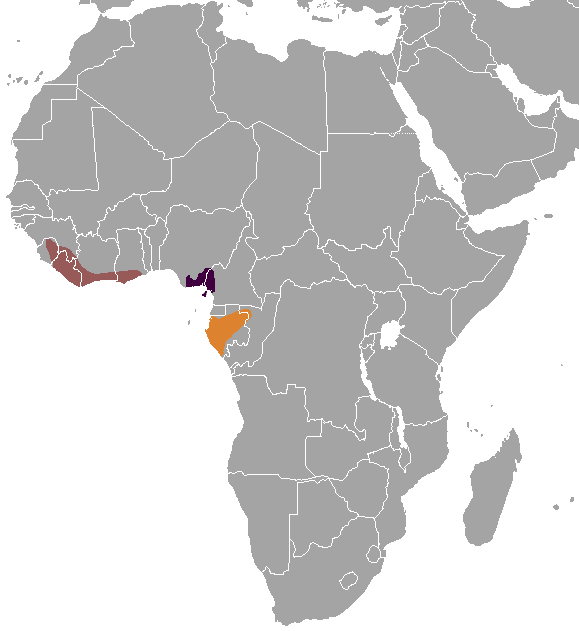
- Distribution of Ogilby's duiker

= Ogilby's duiker =

Species of mammal

Ogilby's duiker (Cephalophorus ogilbyi) is a small antelope found in Sierra Leone, Liberia, Ghana, southeastern Nigeria, Bioko Island and possibly Gabon. It is named after Irish zoologist William Ogilby.

The white-legged duiker (Cephalophorus ogilbyi crusalbum) is currently regarded as a subspecies, while the former subspecies Brooke's duiker (Cephalophorus brookei) is now considered a distinct species.

Ogilby's duiker weighs up to 20 kg (44 lb) and has a shoulder height of up to 56 cm (22 in). It varies in color from chestnut to mahogany to deep brown, and has massive hindquarters typical of duikers.

Ogilby's duiker lives mainly in high-altitude rainforests, where it feeds mainly on fallen fruit.

The total population is estimated to be 12,000 individuals for nominate subspecies C. o. ogilbyi, or approximately 35,000 if Brooke's and white-legged duiker are included.
