= Douglas Carruthers =

English explorer, cartographer and naturalist (1882–1962)

Alexander Douglas Mitchell Carruthers (4 October 1882 – 23 May 1962) was an explorer and naturalist of some repute. He was the son of the Reverend William Mitchell Carruthers of Holbrook, and was an explorer in the Middle East in the early 1900s.

== Biography ==
Carruthers was born in London and was educated at Haileybury College and Trinity College, Cambridge. He worked as secretary to a number of people active at the Royal Geographical Society, and underwent training in land survey work, also becoming an expert taxidermist.

Carruthers took part in the British Museum Ruwenzori expedition to the Congo in 1905-1906 from where he sent home specimens of birds and mammals. In 1910 he joined John H. Miller and Morgan Philips Price in an expedition through the desert of Outer Mongolia, publishing two volumes on Unknown Mongolia in 1913.

In 1915, Carruthers married Mary Morrison Hill Trevor in St. George's, Hanover Square, London. She died in 1948, and on 3 September 1948 he married Rosemary Arden Clay (born 12 August 1908 in Banstead, Surrey).

During the First World War Carruthers was employed mainly at the War Office compiling maps of the Middle East; his later career consisted largely of writing, map making and working with explorers and travellers.

=== Awards ===
In 1910 Carruthers was awarded the Gill Memorial, and in 1912 the Patron's Medal of the Royal Geographical Society, which he was to serve as Honorary Secretary from 1916 to 1921 and as a Fellow from 1909 to 1962. In 1956 Carruthers was awarded the Sykes Medal of the Royal Central Asian Society.

=== Legacy ===
In 1972 Professor Owen Lattimore gave The First Douglas Carruthers Memorial Lecture on "Douglas Carruthers and Geographical Contrasts in Central Asia".

He wrote many books, and collected a large number of specimens, some of which are still the only samples of those species in the British Museum, and some bear his name, "nnn Carruthersi".

=== Death ===
He died in London on 23 May 1962, aged 79. Upon his death, his papers were lodged at the Royal Geographical Society in London. He had no children.

== Bibliography ==
- Unknown Mongolia : a record of travel and exploration in north-west Mongolia and Dzungaria with three chapters on sport by J. H. Miller, and a foreword by Earl Curzon of Kedleston, 1914.
- The Desert Route to India: Being the Journals of Four Travellers by the Great Desert Caravan Route between Aleppo and Basra, 1745–1751, 1929
- Captain Shakespear's Last Journey, 1922
- Notes on the Maps Illustrating the Exploration in Mongolia and Dzungaria, 1913
- Notes on the Journey to the Arpa and Ak-Sai Plateaus in Russian Turkestan-&-Neve, Arthur the Ranges of the Karakoram, 1910
- A Journey in North-Western Arabia, 1910.
- "Notes on the Journey to the Arpa and Ak-Sai Plateaus in Russian Turkestan." The Geographical Journal, Vol. 36, No. 5 (Nov., 1910), pp. 563–570.
- Arabian Adventure, to the Great Nafud in Quest of the Oryx, H.F. & G. Witherby Ltd., London, 1935
- "Further Information on the Turgun Or Kundelun Mountains in North-Western Mongolia, and Notes on a New Map of This Region", Geographical Journal. Vol. XLIV (1914).
- Reminiscences of Gertrude Bell, Journal of the Royal Central Asian Society, Volume 45 Issue 1 1958
- Beyond The Caspian. 1949.
- Ibis vol. XVI.— "On some Birds collected by Mr. Douglas Carruthers in the Syrian Desert", P. L. Sclater D.Sc., F.R.S., British Ornithologists Union, 1906
