= Mount Speke =

Mountain in Uganda

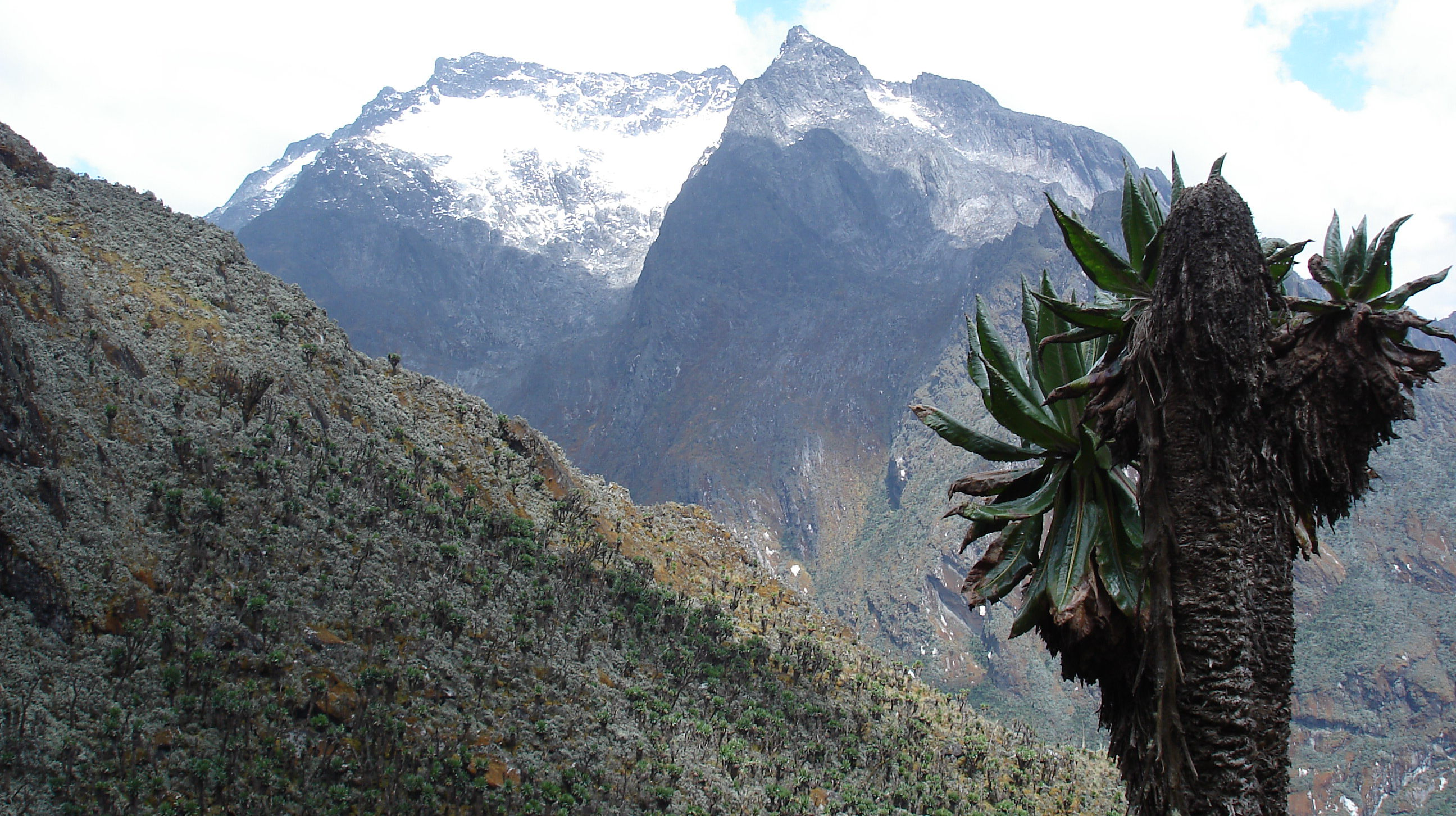
- Mt. Speke as seen from Uganda

Highest point
- Elevation: 4,890 m (16,040 ft)
- Prominence: 730 m (2,400 ft)
- Coordinates: 00°23′53″N 29°53′32″E

Geography
- Location within Uganda
- Location: Uganda
- Parent range: Ruwenzori Range

Climbing
- First ascent: 1906 by Duke of the Abruzzi
- Easiest route: scramble

Mount Speke lies in the Ruwenzori Mountains National Park in Uganda and is the second highest mountain in this range. Together with Mount Stanley and Mount Baker, it forms a triangle enclosing the upper Bujuku Valley. The nearest peak is Mount Stanley, which is 3.55 km (2.21 mi) to the south-southwest. The mountains lie within an area called 'The Mountains of the Moon'.

All mountains in this range consist of multiple jagged peaks. Mount Speke's summits are Vittorio Emanuele 4,890 m (16,040 ft); Ensonga 4,865 m (15,961 ft); Johnston 4,834 m (15,860 ft); and Trident 4,572 m (15,000 ft). The names were chosen in respect for the Italian royal family; however, the name choice had to be approved by the British Protectorate of Uganda who ruled the region at that time.

The people living on the mountains call the 'Rwenzori', which means 'rain maker' or 'rain mountains' in the Bakonjo language. The Baganda, who could see the mountains from far, used to call them 'Gambaragara', which means 'My Eyes Pain', a reference to the shining snow. The Bakonjo had their own names for the peaks in the Rwenzori range, however, as they had never climbed them, it was difficult to clarify which peak was which. For example, they had names for the three main peaks: Kiyanja, Duwoni and Ingomwimbi. The fact is that for the Bakonjo the high Rwenzori is the home of Kitasamba, the god who resides at the high altitudes and cannot be accessed.

Early European explorers visited the region in the search for the source of the Nile. This mountain was named after John Speke. While he never climbed this peak, Speke mapped the source of the White Nile in 1862. All the mountain in this region are named after similar early explorers.

When Duke of the Abruzzi climbed this summit, he climbed all the other peaks in the Rwenzori range.

Due to the large amount of rainfall Mount Speke receives, it is criss-crossed by many rivers and streams. The vegetation tends to be quite thick. There is also a variety of wildlife, including elephants, chimpanzee, monkeys, leopards and antelope.
