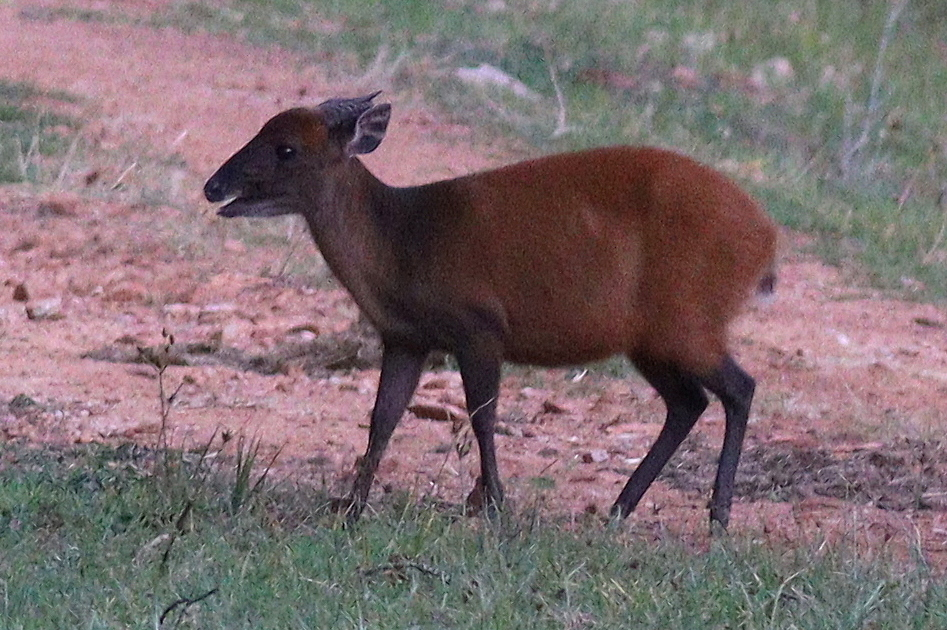

Conservation status
- Least Concern (IUCN 3.1)

Scientific classification
- Kingdom: Animalia
- Phylum: Chordata
- Class: Mammalia
- Order: Artiodactyla
- Family: Bovidae
- Subfamily: Antilopinae
- Genus: Cephalophorus
- Species: C. weynsi

Binomial name
- Cephalophorus weynsi Thomas, 1901
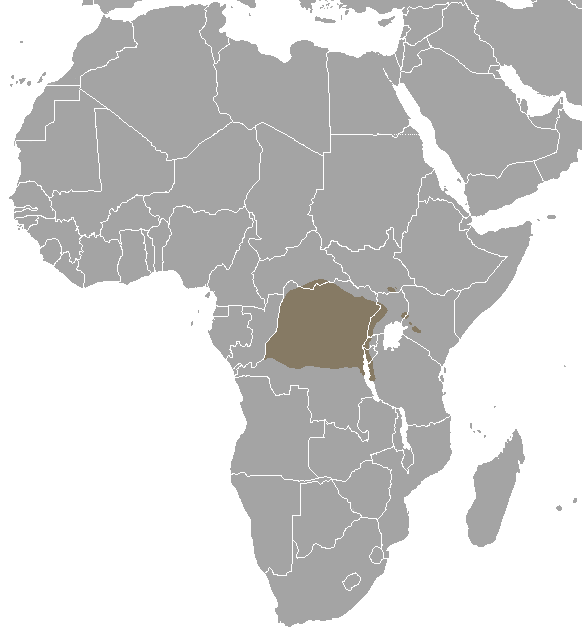
- Distribution of Weyns's duiker

= Weyns's duiker =

Weyns duiker

Species of mammal

Weyns's duiker (Cephalophorus weynsi) is a tiny antelope found in the Democratic Republic of Congo, Uganda, Central African Republic and western Kenya. It is sometimes spelled "Weyn's", "Weyns", or "Weyns'" duiker.

Weyns's duiker averages about 15 kg (33 lb) in weight when full grown, with a shoulder height of about 43 cm (17 in). It has a plain rufous coat.

This duiker makes it home in lowlands and montane rainforests.
