= Cephalophorus =

Scientific classification
- Kingdom: Animalia
- Phylum: Chordata
- Class: Mammalia
- Order: Artiodactyla
- Family: Bovidae
- Subfamily: Antilopinae
- Tribe: Cephalophini
- Genus: Cephalophorus; Gray, 1842

Genus of mammals

Cephalophorus is a genus of antilopine mammals.

There are 11 species assigned to this genus:

- Cephalophorus brookei (O. Thomas, 1903)
- Cephalophorus callipygus (W. C. H. Peters, 1876)
- Cephalophorus kivuensis (Lönnberg, 1919)
- Cephalophorus leucogaster (J. E. Gray, 1873)
- Cephalophorus natalensis (A. Smith, 1834)
- Cephalophorus niger (J. E. Gray, 1846)
- Cephalophorus nigrifrons (J. E. Gray, 1871)
- Cephalophorus ogilbyi (G. R. Waterhouse, 1838)
- Cephalophorus rubidus (O. Thomas, 1901)
- Cephalophorus rufilatus (J. E. Gray, 1846)
- Cephalophorus weynsi (O. Thomas, 1901)
