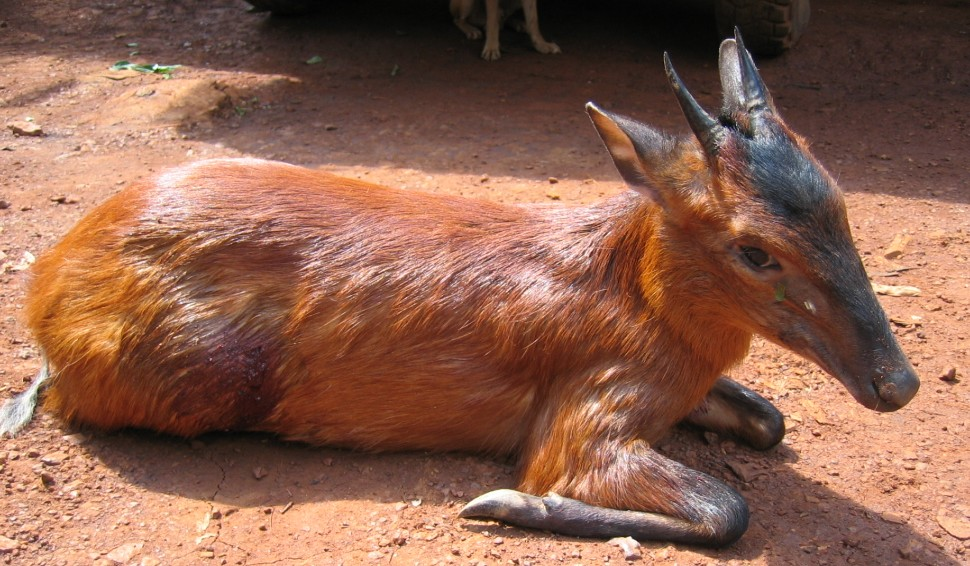

Conservation status
- Least Concern (IUCN 3.1)

Scientific classification
- Kingdom: Animalia
- Phylum: Chordata
- Class: Mammalia
- Order: Artiodactyla
- Family: Bovidae
- Subfamily: Antilopinae
- Genus: Cephalophorus
- Species: C. nigrifrons

Binomial name
- Cephalophorus nigrifrons Gray, 1871
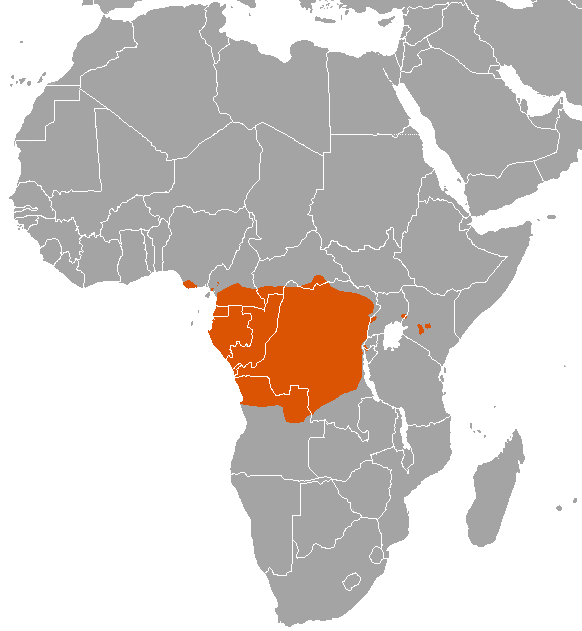
- Distribution of black-fronted duiker

= Black-fronted duiker =

Species of mammal

The black-fronted duiker (Cephalophorus nigrifrons) is a small antelope found in central and west-central Africa.

== Description ==
The black-fronted duiker is a compact, short-necked, and active antelope that gets its name from the broad black streak that runs from the nose to its forehead, a feature distinguishing it from its congeners. It has a glossy coat that is deep reddish-mahogany to a lighter orange-chestnut in colour, the hair becoming sparser and darker on the long legs. It has a short tail that is black with a white tip and short, pointed horns, measuring 4–12 cm (1.6–4.7 in), which are carried by both sexes and are used for defense against other duikers and predators. Its elongated hooves appear to be an adaptation to the wet habitats it tends to prefer. It weighs 14–18 kg (31–40 lb) and has a shoulder height of 43 cm (17 in).

== Distribution ==
The black-fronted duiker is found in central and west-central Africa, with an isolated population in the Niger Delta in eastern Nigeria and then from southern Cameroon east to western Kenya and south to northern Angola.

== Habitat ==
The black-fronted duiker occurs in montane, lowland, and swamp forests, from near sea level up to an altitude of 3,500 metres (11,500 ft). It is frequently recorded in wetter areas such as marshes or on the margins of rivers or streams.

== Habits ==
The black-fronted duiker is territorial and monogamous, each pair owning a territory that it defends against neighbours and is marked using the secretions of the facial glands. The pair have habitual paths within their territory that connect sleeping sites with feeding areas and allow them to be active during both day and night. It is mainly a browser, but will also feed on fruit.
