= Mount Stanley =

Mountain in Central Africa

- Mount Ngaliema
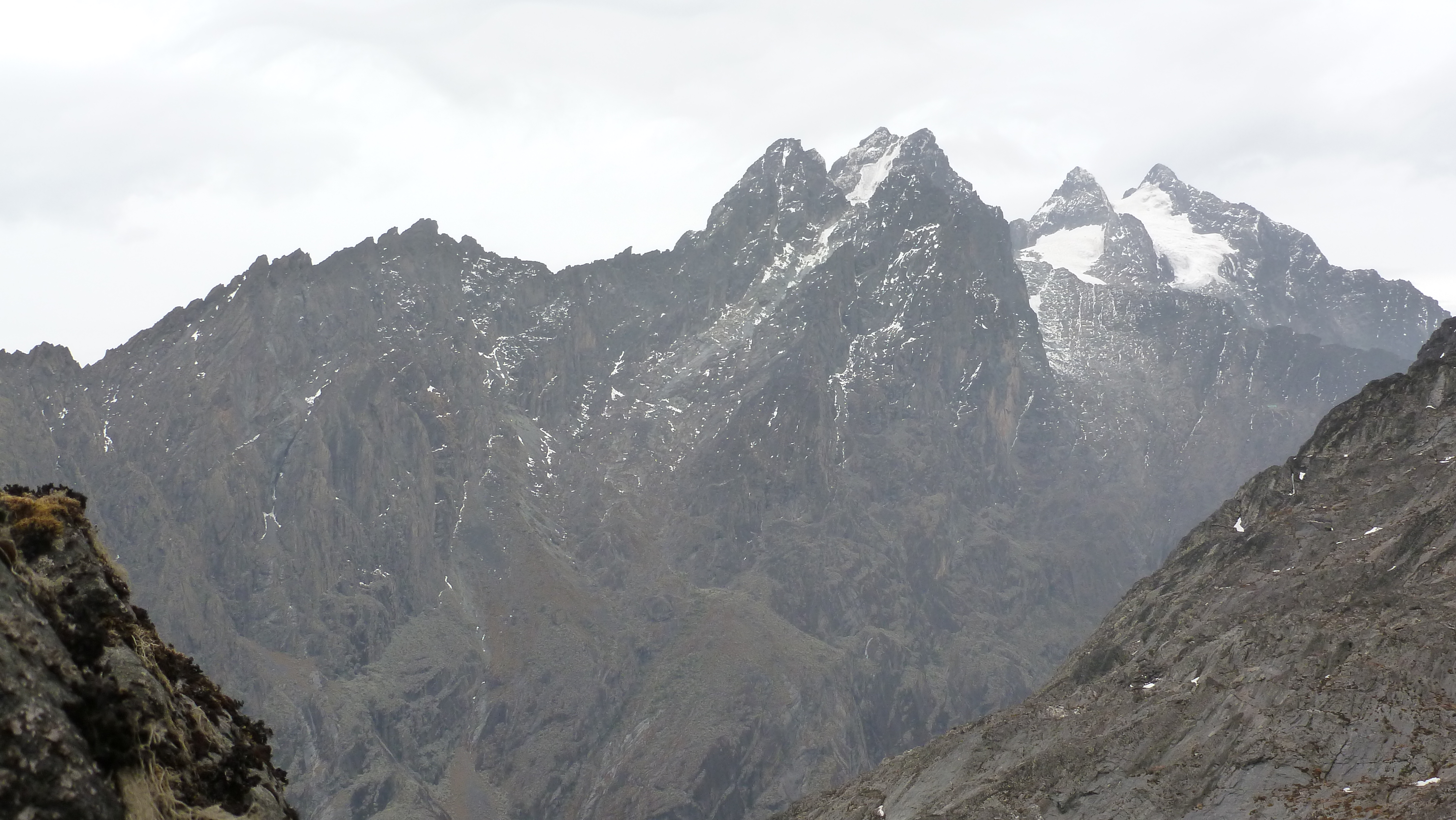
- Mount Stanley; From left to right: Moebius Peak, Elena Peak, Savoia Peak, Alexandra Peak, Margherita Peak

Highest point
- Elevation: 5,109 m (16,762 ft)
- Prominence: 3,924 m (12,874 ft); Ranked 28th
- Listing: Country high point Ultra
- Coordinates: 0°23′09″N 29°52′18″E

Geography
- Location within Uganda
- Countries: Democratic Republic of the Congo; Uganda
- Parent range: Rwenzori Mountains

Climbing
- First ascent: 1906 by Duke of the Abruzzi and party
- Easiest route: rock/snow climb

Mount Stanley, also known as Mount Ngaliema (/əŋɡɑːˈljeɪmə/, also US: /-mɑː/, UK: /əŋˌɡɑːliˈeɪmə/), is a mountain located in the Rwenzori range. With an elevation of 5,109 m (16,763 ft), it is the highest mountain of both the Democratic Republic of the Congo and Uganda, and the fourth-highest in Africa (Note: Although Mount Stanley is the third-tallest independent mountain, Kilimanjaro's second tallest volcanic peak, Mawenzi, has sufficient promience (850 meters) to be considered an independent peak. Both Messner and Bass list Mawenzi in the Seven Third Summits).

The peak and several other surrounding peaks are high enough to support glaciers. Mount Stanley is named for the explorer, journalist, and colonist Sir Henry Morton Stanley. It is part of the Rwenzori Mountains National Park, a UNESCO World Heritage Site.

== Peaks ==
Mt. Stanley consists of two twin summits and several lower peaks:

| Peak | Metres | Feet |
|---|---|---|
| Margherita Peak | 5,109 | 16,763 |
| Alexandra | 5,091 | 16,703 |
| Albert | 5,087 | 16,690 |
| Savoia | 4,977 | 16,330 |
| Ellena | 4,968 | 16,300 |
| Elizabeth | 4,929 | 16,170 |
| Phillip | 4,920 | 16,140 |
| Moebius | 4,916 | 16,130 |
| Cheptegei | 4,907 | 16,099 |
| Great Tooth | 4,603 | 15,100 |

== Expeditions ==
First ascent

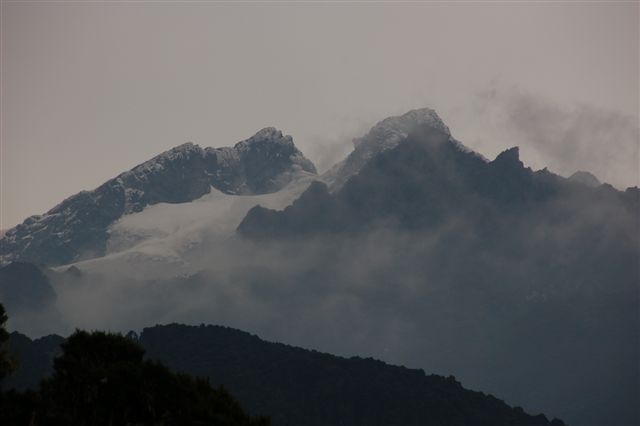
Mount Stanley.

The first recorded ascent of Mt. Stanley was in 1906 by Luigi Amedeo, J. Petigax, C. Ollier, and J. Brocherel. Margherita Peak is named after Queen Margherita of Italy.
