= Anisia =

Scientific classification
- Kingdom: Animalia
- Phylum: Arthropoda
- Clade: Pancrustacea
- Class: Insecta
- Order: Diptera
- Family: Tachinidae
- Subfamily: Exoristinae
- Tribe: Blondeliini
- Genus: Anisia; Wulp, 1890

Type species
- Anisia inflexa Wulp, 1890

Synonyms
- Bonnaniops Townsend, 1935; Nepophasmophaga Townsend, 1927; Gilvella Mesnil, 1960; Oedematocera Townsend, 1916; Santacruziopsis Thompson, 1968; Stenoneura Reinhard, 1945; Tamanamyia Thompson, 1963; Trinitodoria Townsend, 1935; Schistocercophaga Townsend, 1928

Genus of flies

Anisia is a genus of flies in the family Tachinidae.

== Species ==
- Anisia aberrans (Townsend, 1935)(Synonym: Santacruziopsis claripennis Thompson, 1968)
- Anisia ciliata Wulp, 1890
- Anisia cineraria Wulp, 1890
- Anisia cinerea Brèthes, 1909
- Anisia dampfi (Aldrich, 1927)
- Anisia facialis (Townsend, 1927)
- Anisia fatua Wulp, 1890
- Anisia flaveola (Coquillett, 1897)
- Anisia fumipennis (Thompson, 1968)
- Anisia gilvipes (Coquillett, 1897)
- Anisia inflexa Wulp, 1890
- Anisia macroptera Wulp, 1890
- Anisia media (Townsend, 1935)
- Anisia optata (Reinhard, 1942)
- Anisia palposa Wulp, 1890
- Anisia peregrina Wulp, 1890
- Anisia rubripes Wulp, 1890
- Anisia ruficoxa Wulp, 1890
- Anisia serotina (Reinhard, 1945)
- Anisia striata (Aldrich, 1928)
- Anisia vanderwulpi Townsend, 1892

The following species are unplaced in Eryciini:

- Anisia infima Wulp, 1890
- Anisia trifilata Wulp, 1890

The following species were moved to other genera:

- A. aberrans Wulp, 1890: Moved to Vibrissina
- A. accedens Wulp, 1890: Moved to Lydinolydella; synonym of L. rasilis
- A. aegrota Wulp, 1890: Moved to Opsomeigenia
- A. approximata Wulp, 1890: Moved to Houghia
- A. candicans Wulp, 1890: Moved to Vibrissina
- A. congerens Wulp, 1890: Moved to Eucelatoria; synonym of E. dissepta
- A. conspersa Wulp, 1890: Moved to Myiopharus
- A. fulvipennis Wulp, 1890: Moved to Pseudoredtenbacheria
- A. gagatina Wulp, 1890: Moved to Italispidea
- A. inepta Wulp, 1890: Moved to Eucelatoria
- A. intrusa Wulp, 1890: Moved to Eucelatoria
- A. misella Wulp, 1890: Moved to Ametadoria
- A. morionella Wulp, 1890: Moved to Lydinolydella; synonym of L. rasilis
- A. mucorea Wulp, 1890: Moved to Vibrissina
- A. neglecta Wulp, 1890: Moved to Lixophaga
- A. nigella Wulp, 1890: Moved to Eucelatoria
- A. nigrithorax Wulp, 1890: Moved to Erythromelana
- A. nigrocincta Wulp, 1890: Moved to Lixophaga
- A. niveomarginata Wulp, 1890: Moved to Spathidexia
- A. obscurifrons Wulp, 1890: Moved to Erythromelana
- A. opaca Wulp, 1890: Moved to Lixophaga
- A. ophthalmica Wulp, 1890: Moved to Thelairodoria
- A. pallidipalpis Wulp, 1890: Moved to Angustia
- A. pulicaria Wulp, 1890: Moved to Oxynops; synonym of O. anthracinus
- A. pullata Wulp, 1890: Moved to Myiopharus; synonym of M. trifurca
- A. remissa Wulp, 1890: Moved to Lixophaga
- A. signata Wulp, 1890: Moved to Calodexia
- A. similis Wulp, 1890: Moved to Lixophaga
- A. stolida Wulp, 1890: Moved to Eucelatoria; synonym of E. inepta
- A. umbrina Wulp, 1890: Moved to Lixophaga
