= H. frontalis =

H. frontalis may refer to:

- Hemiargyropsis frontalis, a tachinid fly species
- Hemispingus frontalis, the oleaginous hemispingus, a bird species found in Colombia, Ecuador and Peru
- Hyperolius frontalis, a frog species found in Democratic Republic of the Congo and Uganda

== See also ==
- Frontalis (disambiguation)
