= Anisia aberrans =

Scientific classification
- Kingdom: Animalia
- Phylum: Arthropoda
- Class: Insecta
- Order: Diptera
- Family: Tachinidae
- Subfamily: Exoristinae
- Tribe: Blondeliini
- Genus: Anisia
- Species: A. aberrans

Binomial name
- Anisia aberrans (Townsend, 1935)

Synonyms
- Bonnaniops aberrans Townsend, 1935

Species of fly

Anisia aberrans is a species of fly in the family Tachinidae.

Not to be confused with Anisia aberrans of van der Wulp from Mexico, which is now Vibrissina aberrans (Wulp, 1890).

== Distribution ==
Trinidad and Tobago.
