= Ruwenzorek =

Scientific classification
- Kingdom: Animalia
- Phylum: Arthropoda
- Subphylum: Chelicerata
- Class: Arachnida
- Order: Araneae
- Infraorder: Araneomorphae
- Family: Salticidae
- Genus: Ruwenzorek; Wiśniewski & Wesołowska, 2024
- Species: R. evansi

Binomial name
- Ruwenzorek evansi Wiśniewski & Wesołowska, 2024

Species of spider

Ruwenzorek is a monotypic genus of spiders in the family Salticidae containing the single species, Ruwenzorek evansi.

== Distribution ==
Ruwenzorek evansi is endemic to Uganda.

== Etymology ==
The genus is named after the mountain range Ruwenzori, where the species was found.
