= Erythromelana jaena =

Scientific classification
- Kingdom: Animalia
- Phylum: Arthropoda
- Class: Insecta
- Order: Diptera
- Family: Tachinidae
- Subfamily: Exoristinae
- Tribe: Blondeliini
- Genus: Erythromelana
- Species: E. jaena

Binomial name
- Erythromelana jaena Townsend, 1919

Species of fly

Erythromelana jaena is a species of fly in the family Tachinidae, found in South America.

== Distribution ==
Found along the Andes at high elevations of 2,150m in Jaén and between 2,000 and 2,600m in Napo Province.

== Description ==
Males are typically between 6.8mm and 7.6mm with a yellow abdomen, 6 or more (rarely 5) well-developed anteroventral setae, and the apex of the cerci have truncated tips. E. jaena closely resembles E. abdominalis.
