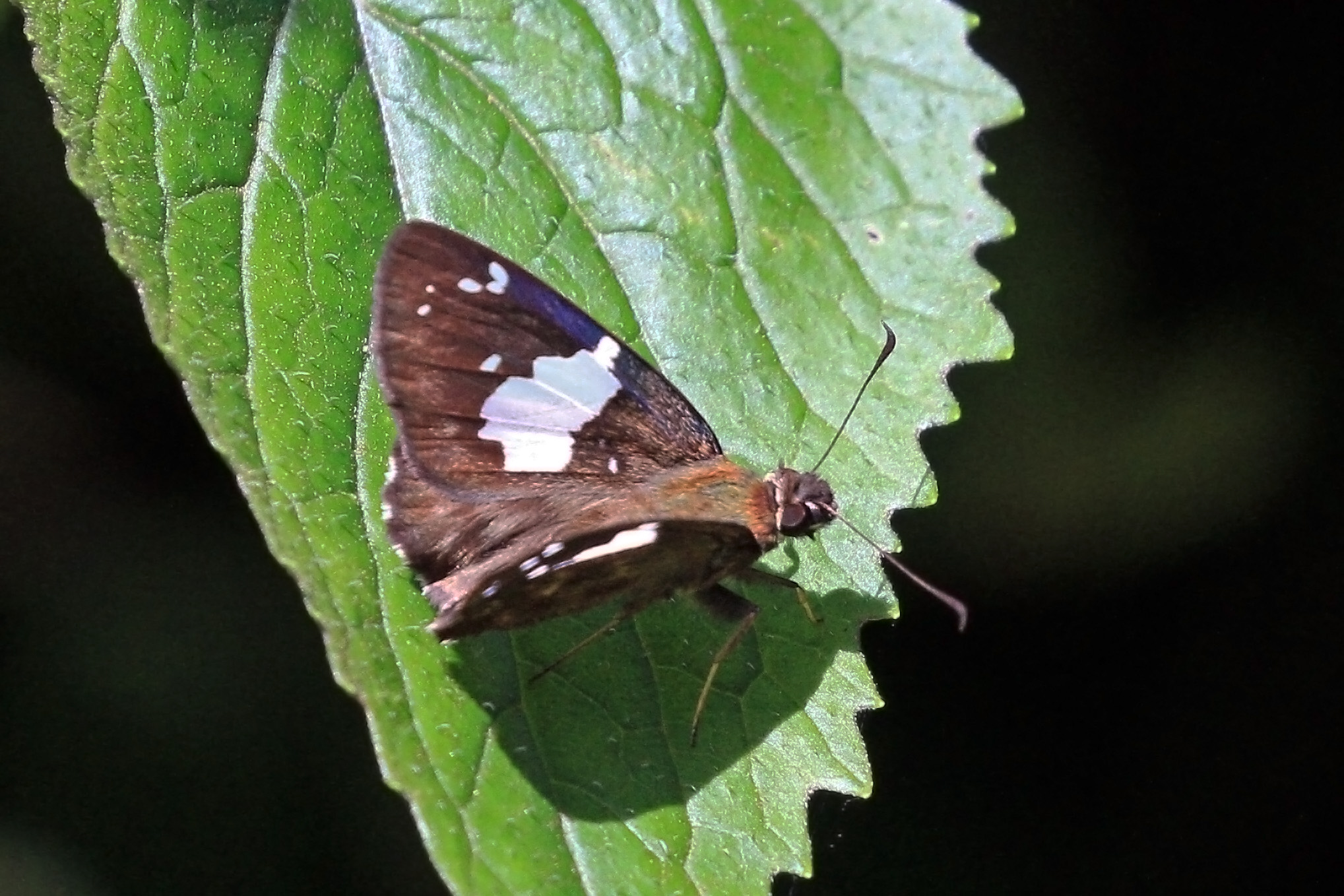
- Kakamega Forest, Kenya

Scientific classification
- Kingdom: Animalia
- Phylum: Arthropoda
- Clade: Pancrustacea
- Class: Insecta
- Order: Lepidoptera
- Family: Hesperiidae
- Genus: Celaenorrhinus
- Species: C. proxima

Binomial name
- Celaenorrhinus proxima (Mabille, 1877)

Synonyms
- Plesioneura proxima Mabille, 1877; Tagiades elmina Plötz, 1879

= Celaenorrhinus proxima =

Common black sprite

Species of butterfly

Celaenorrhinus proxima, commonly known as the common black sprite, is a species of butterfly in the family Hesperiidae. It is found in Guinea, Sierra Leone, Liberia, Ivory Coast, Ghana, Togo, Nigeria, Cameroon, Democratic Republic of the Congo, Sudan, Uganda, Kenya and Tanzania. The habitat consists of forests and heavy woodland.

The larvae feed on Mimulopsis species.

== Subspecies ==
- Celaenorrhinus proxima proxima (Cameroon to Sudan, Uganda, western Tanzania, western Kenya)
- Celaenorrhinus proxima maesseni Berger, 1976 (Guinea, Sierra Leone, Liberia, Ivory Coast, Ghana, Togo, Nigeria, western Cameroon)

Torben Larsen developed a species numbering system for his 2005 publication Butterflies of West Africa. The subspecies Celaenorrhinus proxima maesseni was #1230. This 'Larsen' number is used with permission in A Sharp Eye on Butterflies of Ghana, where the butterfly is elevated to species stats as Celaenorrhinus maesseni.
