= Hyperolius frontalis =

Conservation status
- Least Concern (IUCN 3.1)

Scientific classification
- Kingdom: Animalia
- Phylum: Chordata
- Class: Amphibia
- Order: Anura
- Family: Hyperoliidae
- Genus: Hyperolius
- Species: H. frontalis

Binomial name
- Hyperolius frontalis Laurent, 1950

Species of frog

Hyperolius frontalis is a species of frog in the family Hyperoliidae. It is found in the eastern Democratic Republic of the Congo, from northwest of Mount Rwenzori, south to west of Lake Kivu, extending into extreme south-western Uganda in the Bwindi Forest. Common names Bushoho reed frog and white-snouted reed frog have been coined for this species.

== Description ==
Adult males measure 25–29 mm (1.0–1.1 in) in snout–vent length. The dorsum is bright translucent green with some mottling. The snout bears a conspicuous light golden triangle. A light, brief, broad dorsolateral stripe is sometimes present, occasionally extending further back than the shoulder region. Calling males have green vocal sac.

The male advertisement call is a brief, hard buzzing that is repeated two–three times.

== Habitat and conservation ==
Hyperolius frontalis occurs in lowland and montane forest at elevations of 700–2,000 m (2,300–6,600 ft) above sea level. It has been recorded in dense secondary vegetation overhanging a small stream and in a small marsh in forest. Breeding habitat is unknown, but presumably the larvae are aquatic. It appears to be common within its range. It is threatened by habitat loss caused by agriculture activities, wood extraction, and expanding human settlements. It occurs in the Bwindi National Park in Uganda and in the Virunga National Park and—possibly—Kahuzi-Biega National Park in the Democratic Republic of Congo.
