= Eucelatoria argentea =

Scientific classification
- Kingdom: Animalia
- Phylum: Arthropoda
- Class: Insecta
- Order: Diptera
- Family: Tachinidae
- Subfamily: Exoristinae
- Tribe: Blondeliini
- Genus: Eucelatoria
- Species: E. argentea

Binomial name
- Eucelatoria argentea (Thompson, 1968)

Synonyms
- Heliodexodes argenteus Thompson, 1968

Species of fly

Eucelatoria argentea is a species of tachinid flies in the genus Eucelatoria of the family Tachinidae.

== Distribution ==
Trinidad and Tobago.
