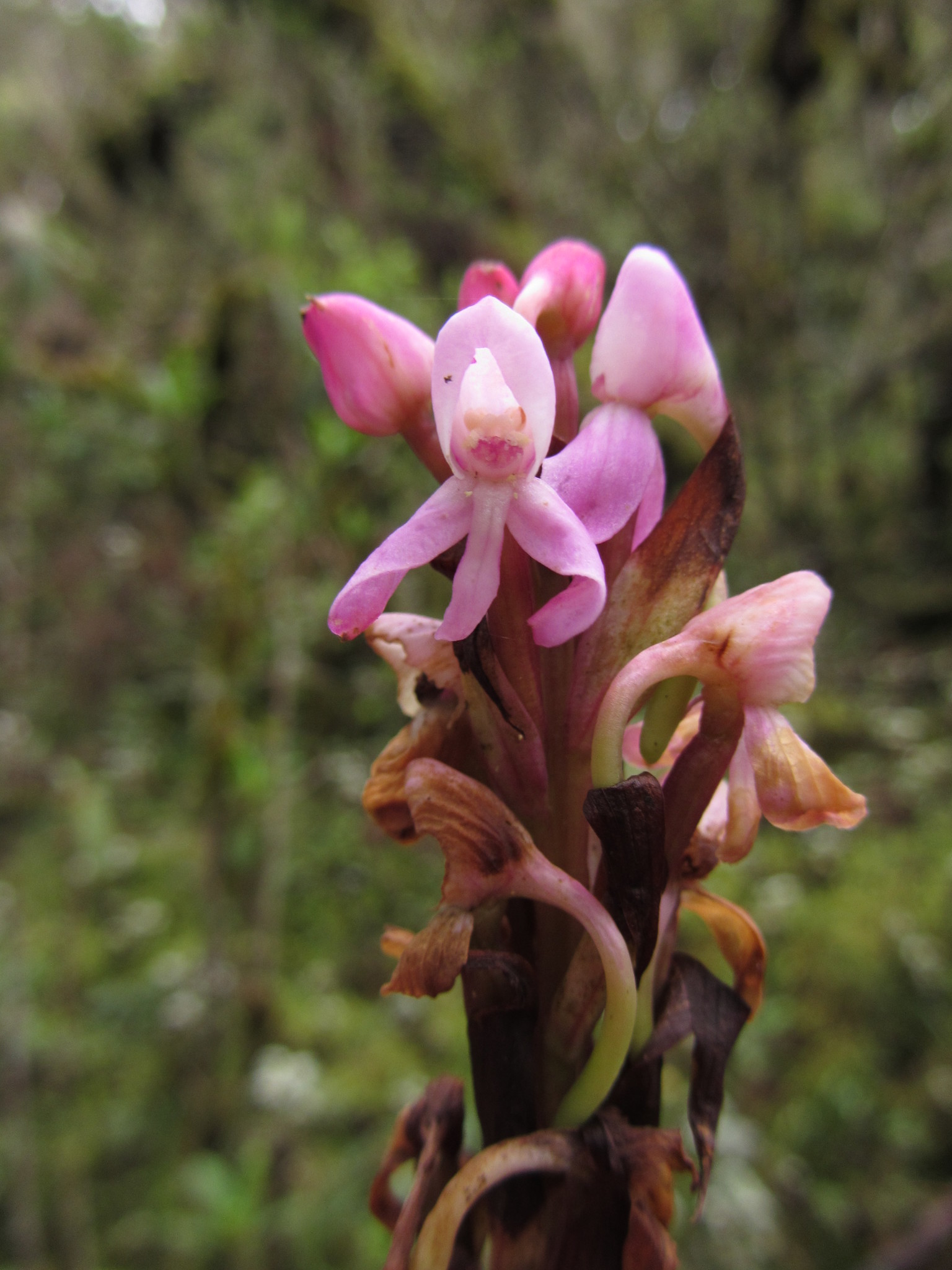

Scientific classification
- Kingdom: Plantae
- Clade: Tracheophytes
- Clade: Angiosperms
- Clade: Monocots
- Order: Asparagales
- Family: Orchidaceae
- Subfamily: Orchidoideae
- Genus: Disa
- Species: D. stairsii

Binomial name
- Disa stairsii Kraenzl. (1892)

Synonyms
- Disa bakeri Rolfe; Disa gregoriana Rendle; Disa luxurians Kraenzl. Disa wissmannii Kraenzl.

= Disa stairsii =

Species of flowering plant

Disa stairsii (Rwenzori mountain orchid) is a species of Disa of the family Orchidaceae that can be found growing with the giant heathers on the Rwenzori Mountains of mountains in East Tropical Africa as well as in the Congo in West-Central Tropical Africa. It was first collected by Lieutenant Stairs in 1889, during the Emin Pasha Relief Expedition, whilst he was carrying out the first European exploration of the Rwenzori Mountains.

Disa stairsii is cardinal red, distinct from the other foliage by its single spur which is borne on the top of its flower and is generally growing in moss between the altitudes of 2,800–3,400 meters (9,200–11,200 feet). It is common in the heath belt of the Ruwenzori Range. On Kilimanjaro D. stairsii also grows among the heath along with Erica arborea and Erica rossi, is "small pink flowered" and is hidden by clumps of grasses along with the white flowered Anemone thomsonii.

The flower featured on the 50 centimes stamp in the 1976 series of Rwanda orchid stamps.
