= Senecio transmarinus =

Scientific classification
- Kingdom: Plantae
- Clade: Tracheophytes
- Clade: Angiosperms
- Clade: Eudicots
- Clade: Asterids
- Order: Asterales
- Family: Asteraceae
- Genus: Senecio
- Species: S. transmarinus

Binomial name
- Senecio transmarinus S.Moore

Synonyms
- Senecio confertoides De Wild; Senecio lanuriensis De Wild.

Species of flowering plant

Senecio transmarinus is a sometimes straggling member of the flowering plants Asteraceae and species of the genus Senecio a perennial herb that grows on the higher elevations of the Rwenzori Mountains in Uganda. It is also found in Rwanda and the Democratic Republic of the Congo. The inflorescences consist of several flowerheads with large yellow ray florets.

== Description ==
Sometimes straggling and sometimes straight and found in the heathbelt and "alpine zone" between 3,000 and 4,200 meters (9,800 and 13,800 ft), Senecio transmarinus plants are much larger at lower altitudes than at the higher altitudes.

Stems and leaves
Stems 30 to 240 centimeters (12 to 94 inches) tall and are mostly without hairs. Leaves at the base are 3 to 8 centimeters (1.2 to 3.1 inches) long, a measurement which includes the petiole, and 1 to 2 centimeters wide. Leaves are lobed and somewhat waxy or sparsely hairy and sometimes purple on the bottom.

Flowers
"Inflorescences with several flower heads with striking large yellow ray florets" in clusters of 1 to many, each with 6 to 12 yellow ray florets and 5-veined disc yellow disc florets.

Fruits
Achenes 4 to 5 millimeters long and hairless; pappus 5 to 8 millimeters long.
