= Anisia inflexa =

Scientific classification
- Kingdom: Animalia
- Phylum: Arthropoda
- Class: Insecta
- Order: Diptera
- Family: Tachinidae
- Subfamily: Exoristinae
- Tribe: Blondeliini
- Genus: Anisia
- Species: A. inflexa

Binomial name
- Anisia inflexa Wulp, 1890

Species of fly

Anisia inflexa is a species of fly in the family Tachinidae.

== Distribution ==
Mexico.
