= Eucelatoria striolata =

Scientific classification
- Kingdom: Animalia
- Phylum: Arthropoda
- Class: Insecta
- Order: Diptera
- Family: Tachinidae
- Subfamily: Exoristinae
- Tribe: Blondeliini
- Genus: Eucelatoria
- Species: E. striolata

Binomial name
- Eucelatoria striolata (Wulp, 1890)

Synonyms
- Telothyria striolata Wulp, 1890; Hemilydella fasciata Townsend, 1927

Species of fly

Eucelatoria striolata is a species of tachinid fly in the genus Eucelatoria of the family Tachinidae.
