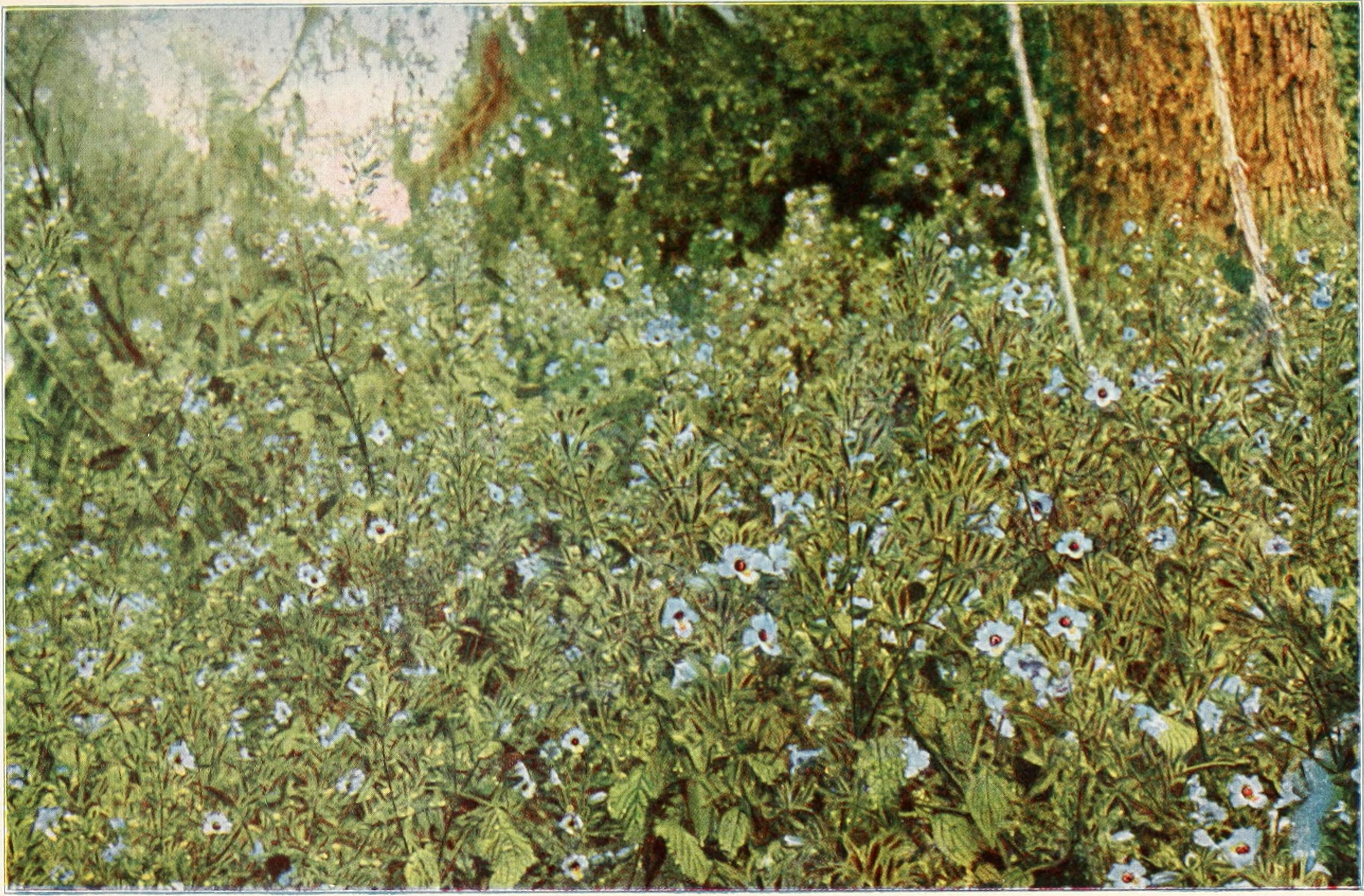

Scientific classification
- Kingdom: Plantae
- Clade: Tracheophytes
- Clade: Angiosperms
- Clade: Eudicots
- Clade: Asterids
- Order: Lamiales
- Family: Acanthaceae
- Genus: Mimulopsis
- Species: M. solmsii

Binomial name
- Mimulopsis solmsii Schweinf. (1868)

Synonyms
- Mimulopsis bagshawei S.Moore; Mimulopsis bicalcarata Lindau; Mimulopsis sesamoides S.Moore; Mimulopsis solmsii var. kivuensis (Mildbr.) Troupin; Mimulopsis solmsii var. mikenica (Mildbr.) Troupin; Mimulopsis solmsii var. orophila Troupin; Mimulopsis spathulata C.B.Clarke; Mimulopsis thomsonii C.B.Clarke; Mimulopsis usumburensis Lindau; Mimulopsis velutinella Mildbr.; Mimulopsis violacea Lindau

= Mimulopsis solmsii =

Species of flowering plant

Mimulopsis solmsii is a flowering plant from the family Acanthaceae. It is a native to the mountains of tropical Africa. It is the type species for the genus Mimulopsis.

== Description ==
It is a shrubby perennial herb, with a scrambling or erect form. Its leaves are ovate, opposite, and large, up to 21 cm, with a coarsely-toothed margin.

Its flowers form a large open and branched inflorescence, 15-35 cm long, made up of 1 to 9-flowered groups. The flowers are five-petaled, white to pale mauve with an orange-brown throat and one or two yellow markings.

Plants flower abundantly after 5 to 9 years, and die back after flowering.

== Range and habitat ==
Mimulopsis solmsii is native to the mountains of tropical Africa, including Guinea, Liberia, and Sierra Leone in West Africa, Cameroon, Nigeria, and the Gulf of Guinea Islands in west-central Africa, and Ethiopia, South Sudan, Kenya, Uganda, Tanzania, Democratic Republic of the Congo, Rwanda, Burundi, Malawi, Mozambique, Zambia, and Zimbabwe in eastern Africa.

It grows in the understorey of and along the margins of evergreen montane forests between 950 and 2300 meters elevation.
