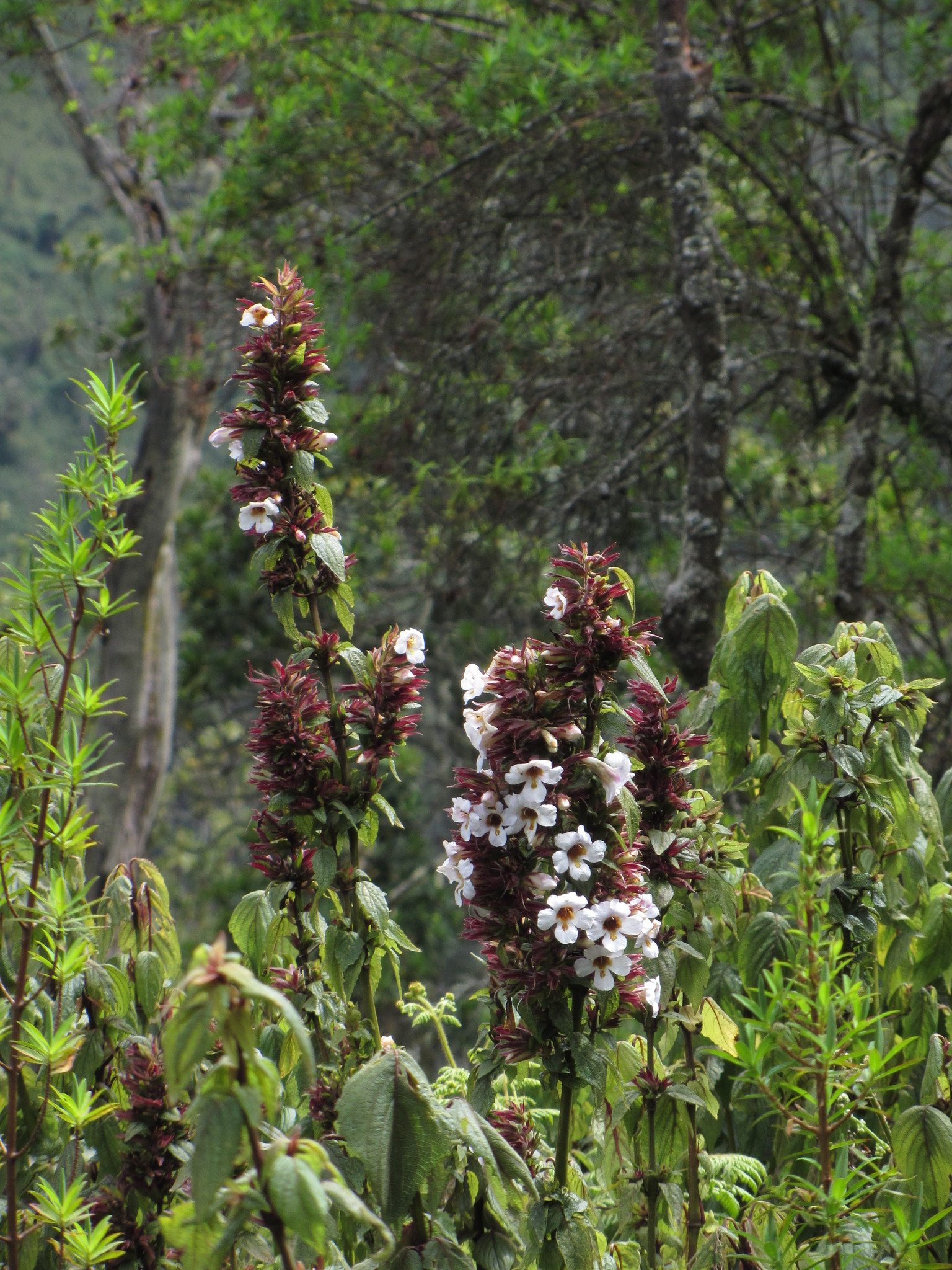
- In Uganda

Scientific classification
- Kingdom: Plantae
- Clade: Tracheophytes
- Clade: Angiosperms
- Clade: Eudicots
- Clade: Asterids
- Order: Lamiales
- Family: Acanthaceae
- Genus: Mimulopsis
- Species: M. elliotii

Binomial name
- Mimulopsis elliotii C.B.Clarke

= Mimulopsis elliotii =

Species of shrub

Mimulopsis elliotii is a flowering shrub from the family Acanthaceae and a species of the genus Mimulopsis. This flowering shrub is one of the species that can be found in the Rwenzori Mountains.
