= Eucelatoria aurata =

Scientific classification
- Kingdom: Animalia
- Phylum: Arthropoda
- Class: Insecta
- Order: Diptera
- Family: Tachinidae
- Subfamily: Exoristinae
- Tribe: Blondeliini
- Genus: Eucelatoria
- Species: E. aurata

Binomial name
- Eucelatoria aurata (Townsend, 1927)

Synonyms
- Heliolydella aurata Townsend, 1927

Species of fly

Eucelatoria aurata is a species of fly in the family Tachinidae.

== Distribution ==
The species is found in Brazil and Venezuela.
