= Eucelatoria nigripalpis =

Scientific classification
- Kingdom: Animalia
- Phylum: Arthropoda
- Class: Insecta
- Order: Diptera
- Family: Tachinidae
- Subfamily: Exoristinae
- Tribe: Blondeliini
- Genus: Eucelatoria
- Species: E. nigripalpis

Binomial name
- Eucelatoria nigripalpis (Bigot, 1889)

Synonyms
- Ceromasia spinipes Bigot, 1889; Chetolyga nigripalpis Bigot, 1889

Species of fly

Eucelatoria nigripalpis is a species of fly in the family Tachinidae.

== Distribution ==
Mexico.
