= Klaus Thymann =

Danish photographer, explorer and reporter

- Born: 1974 (age 51–52); Copenhagen, Denmark
- Education: Bachelor of Science
- Alma mater: The Open University
- Occupations: Explorer; Scientist; Creator
- Years active: 1997 - present
- Organization: Project Pressure
- Awards: Sony World Photography Awards; Danish Music Awards
- Website: www.klausthymann.com

Klaus Thymann (born 1974) is a Danish explorer, scientist, fellow at The Explorers Club, fellow at the Royal Geographical Society, photographer, filmmaker and creator. He combines journalism, image making, mapping, documentary and exploration with a focus on contemporary issues and the climate emergency. Thymann has been featured by BBC, National Geographic, The Guardian, New Scientist and other media outlets. He was awarded with the Sony World Photography Award in 2013 and was the youngest winner of the Scandinavian Kodak Gold Award in 1996. He is on the Expert Roster at UNESCO – UN Decade of Ocean Science for Sustainable Development.

== Early life, education ==
Thymann was born in 1974 in Copenhagen, Denmark. In 1988, at the age of fourteen, he began working as a photographer, photographing tourists for the Canal Tours. For the next few years, he also worked as a photographer and writer for several Danish publications. He attended Marie Kruses Skole in Farum, Denmark where he graduated in 1993. In 1996, Thymann was the recipient of the Scandinavian Kodak Gold Award. He received a Bachelor of Science degree in Environmental studies from The Open University (UK) in 2015.

== Early career ==
In Thymann's early career he photographed musicians and made music videos, he worked with Kashimir and photographed David Bowie, Depeche Mode, Coldplay, Green Day, David Bowie, Linkin Park, The Kills, Prodigy, The Cardigans, Suede, Elvis Costello and Robyn amongst others.

In collaboration with the Danish alternative rock band Kashmir, he created the music video of the song "Mom in Love & Daddy in Space”. He was awarded with the 2000 Danish Music Awards in the Danish Music Video of the Year category for the video and the video was nominated for an MTV award.

== Career ==
Thymann has a degree in environmental science. Through leading teams and working collaboratively, Thymann has partnered with institutions including NASA, the United Nations, World Glacier Monitoring Service and Danish Technical University – conceiving new methodologies and creating inventions along the way. In 2020, Thymann discovered an abundance of corals in Jammer Bay, Denmark which led him to start a habitat mapping project with the Danish Technical University, in partnership with the local fishing community, funded by a €500,000 grant he secured from the Velux Foundation. He has conducted the only scuba dive of the world's clearest lake in New Zealand and made several discoveries as he conducts exploration with a scientific purpose.

As a journalist, Thymann has conducted original reporting for BBC, Bloomberg, CNN, the New York Times, The Guardian, Vice and many others while working from conflict zones, jungles, remote mountains, glaciers, and the oceans. Thymann began working in journalism as a teenager. In 1997 he co-founded a Danish magazine, Virus, a biannual publication with in-depth features. The magazine was first to publish a feature on ECHELON, a surveillance program operated by the United States. The feature opened up the way for an investigation by a committee of the European Parliament during 2000 and 2001 with a report published in 2001. From 2000, he started working internationally and undertook diverse assignments include reporting and photographing for the New York Times in Gaza and Tonga, conducting expeditions in Uganda and Congo DRC for the BBC, and decades of environmental reporting for The Guardian.

As an explorer, he has led more than 50 expeditions to extreme environments across six continents and into four of the planet's oceans. He is a fellow at The Explorers Club of New York, a designation he earned through finding corals in Danish waters, prehistoric human bones deep inside a submerged Mexican cave system, and an unexplored manatee habitat in the Yucatán. He has revealed equatorial glaciers by trekking a new route into Congo and reported unnamed glaciers in Nepal. He has documented tourism in Iraq, parkour in Gaza, the relocation of the Arctic town Kiruna In Sweden and explored the glaciers of Uganda and Congo via new trekking routes. He is comfortable confronting the limits of the human body, both as a climber summiting oxygen-deprived peaks above 6300m and as a technical diver capable of navigating in deep waters, below ice, and in narrow flooded caves. His scientific and exploration work has been featured by New Scientist, National Geographic, Wired, Red Bull and more.

As a filmmaker, Thymann has reached audiences of tens of millions through commissions from media outlets. For CNN, he travelled into Brazil's Amazon, past the frontier of deforestation, to show the conflict between an indigenous community and land grabbing ranchers. In the Bikini Atolls for CNN, he dived atomic wrecks and walked on the still-toxic island to tell the story of America's nuclear legacy. He has revealed the impact of mining in the Arctic through the story of long-time residents and Sami reindeer herders. For The Guardian he entered a never explored glacier cave. Thymann's work in Mexico has taken him cave diving beneath illegal construction sites in the jungle and up close with cartels haunting the streets of Tulum for Vice and New Scientist featuring his manatee habitat discovery.

As an artist, his artworks have been exhibited at Designmuseum Denmark, Horniman Museum London, Institute of Contemporary Art London, Natural History Museum Vienna, Museum of Climate Change Hong Kong and Moderna Museet Stockholm.

Thymann has guest lectured at Oxford University, University of St Andrews, The Photographers' Gallery, Central St. Martin's College of Art and Design, Hong Kong University, Rome University, Cancun University, University of the Arts London, Natural History Museum Vienna. He is a Hasselblad Ambassador and has served on the board of organizations such The Design and Artists Copyright Society, UNICEF, Extinction Rebellion and Red Cross. His charitable work has been supported by the Queen of Denmark, Arts Council England, Danish Arts Foundation and Swiss Environmental Ministry.

In 2008, he establish the charity Project Pressure, an ecological and climate-focused charity which instigates, conceptualizes, and leads change-driven projects with an emphasis on field-building. Through Project Pressure he collaborates with well-known artists to create and exhibit provocative work that inspires climate action. Materials from these projects have been used by activists and policymakers to support their ongoing work.

== Projects and expeditions ==
=== Hybrids ===
In 2007, Thymann completed a four-year documentation and published Hybrids, an art project featuring documentary photography with a global perspective exploring peculiar hybrid cultures around the planet, such as Snow Polo in St. Moritz, Gay Rodeo in Los Angeles, Underwater Striptease in Chile, Underground Gardening in Tokyo and more. Hybrids is a significant body of Thymann's art work between 2004 and 2008 and was exhibited in London, New York and Copenhagen.

=== Project Pressure ===
In 2008, Thymann founded Project Pressure, a global environmental charity dedicated to highlight the impact of climate change, inspiring action and participation. The charity is collaborating with artists creating and exhibiting work to engage emotions in order to incite positive behavioural change.

=== Rwenzori Mountains ===
In 2012, Thymann with his journalist colleague Ian Daly, and a team of nine local Ugandans spent 18 days detailing Rwenzori Mountains' glaciers from both sides of the range that lies on the equator. He has uncovered glaciers by trekking a new route into Congo and an applying historic maps onto a GPS device and Thymann's team traversed Congolese side of the range, where few have been for decades because of insurgency and war. Thymann documented that glaciers have retreated massively on the east side of the mountains and the meltdown is super-intense with less than one kilometer square of ice remaining. Some geographers estimate that there will be no ice left within a decade. In 2025, an expedition led by Thymann resulted in the first ever 3D model of the glacier on Mount Stanley, documenting a 29.5% decline of its surface area between 2020 and 2025.

=== Worlds clearest lake ===
Thymann is the only person known to have conducted a scuba dive in the world's clearest lake, Blue Lake in New Zealand. In February 2013, he explored the underwater cave system of the Yucatán Peninsula in order to take photographs, diving 1 km underwater to where salt and freshwater meet. The expedition was supported by New Zealand Department of Conservation and New Zealand Tourism and featured in The Guardian. In 2015, for the images taken during this expedition, Thymann received Honorable Mention at the International Photography Awards.

=== Kiruna ===
Starting in 2013, Thymann has documented the Arctic town of Kiruna in the Lapland region of Sweden creating and ongoing documentation of move of the town because of the unstable ground as a fissure caused by excessive iron ore. Thymann's expedition to Kiruna received coverage from Vice, Bloomberg and CNN. In 2025, Kiruna Church was moved, which Thymann documented.

=== Glacier documentation ===
Since 2008, Thymann has led expedition to detail the glaciers in remote regions to show that climate change is a global issue. He has led expeditions to Iceland, Norway, Switzerland, Sweden, United States, Argentina, Mexico, Chile, Spain, Uganda, Greenland, Iran, New Zealand, Nepal, Ecuador, Bolivia and Colombia. The expeditions were part of a mission by the charity Project Pressure to document the world's vanishing and receding glaciers using art as inspiration for action.

=== Underwater cave exploration ===
Since 2016, Thymann is exploring underwater rivers on the Yucatán in Mexico. He wrote and directed a long-format documentary film of this form of environmental exploration, Flows, with music by Thom Yorke. By mapping underwater caves, areas that have been untouched by modern civilisation, he hopes to raise awareness of the natural and human heritage of the ecosystem that he hopes will result in greater protection. In 2018, The Guardian featured his work and in 2020, he created a short documentary for Red Bull. In 2022, Thymann discovered a new manatee habitat within the cenotes and documented the discovery with a 12-minute film that is available on the interactive streaming platform WaterBear. The discovery got picked up by the New Scientist in 2024, who featured in a 10-minute short film.

=== Tonga Whales ===
In an expedition to the coast of Vava'u, Tonga in 2017, Thymann photographed the Tonga Whales for The New York Times Magazine. The series documents the pilot and humpback whales congregating in Tonga to raise their new-born calves.

=== Shroud ===
In an attempt to preserve an ice-grotto tourist attraction at the Rhône Glacier, local Swiss entrepreneurs wrapped a significant section of the ice-body in a thermal blanket. In early 2018, in their collaborative work, Simon Norfolk and Thymann address financial issues as driving forces behind human adaptation to the changing climate. The title Shroud refers to the melting glacier under its death cloak. In addition, a thermal image time-lapse film was created, showing how glaciers compare to the surrounding landscape by only reacting to long-term temperature changes, as opposed to weather fluctuations. The project was featured in New Scientist and the Los Angeles Times and is part of Project Pressure's travelling exhibition MELTDOWN.

=== Nuclear wrecks in the Bikini Atolls ===
In 2019, Thymann dived the nuclear wrecks in the Bikini Atoll at 65 meters depth. In a mini documentary for CNN, Thymann travelled to the Marshall Islands to learn about the legacy of United States nuclear testing.

=== Voices For The Future ===
In 2019, Thymann-led global charity Project Pressure was responsible for the Voices For The Future, an art piece projected and transmitted on the UN building, featuring Swedish student activist Greta Thunberg in New York City in the lead-up to the 2019 UN Climate Action Summit. Thymann authored the messages of six young activists, including an authorized edit of Thunberg's words. The visualization was done by New Zealand-based artist Joseph Michael. Soundtracked by musician and artist Brian Eno and their commentary on the climate crisis.

=== Corals in Denmark ===
In 2020, Thymann led a seafloor mapping project at Jammerbugt coast in Jutland, Denmark where he discovered an abundance of dead man's fingers, the only soft coral found in Danish waters. Earlier, it was believed that the majority of the Jammerbugten's seafloor was sandy with a low density of species, until Thymann found evidence of much greater biodiversity in a range seafloor habitats. This discovery by Thymann received wide coverage including that from The Guardian in July 2020 and a 7-minute short film featured by New Scientist in late 2023.
