= Lixophaga tenuis =

Scientific classification
- Domain: Eukaryota
- Kingdom: Animalia
- Phylum: Arthropoda
- Class: Insecta
- Order: Diptera
- Family: Tachinidae
- Genus: Lixophaga
- Species: L. tenuis

Binomial name
- Lixophaga tenuis (Blanchard, 1959)

Synonyms
- Actinotachina tenuis Blanchard, 1959

Species of fly

Lixophaga tenuis is a species of tachinid flies in the genus Lixophaga of the family Tachinidae.
