= Senecio mattirolii =

Scientific classification
- Kingdom: Plantae
- Clade: Tracheophytes
- Clade: Angiosperms
- Clade: Eudicots
- Clade: Asterids
- Order: Asterales
- Family: Asteraceae
- Genus: Senecio
- Species: S. mattirolii

Binomial name
- Senecio mattirolii Chiov.

Species of herb

Senecio mattirolii is a perennial herb of the family Asteraceae endemic to altitudes between 3,600–4,500 meters (11,800–14,800 ft) on the slopes of the mountains of the Ruwenzori Mountains in Uganda and the Democratic Republic of the Congo and an atypical species of the genus Senecio since it has purple flowers.

Standing straight and tall and common in the open, stony slopes on the mountains where it lives, Senecio mattirolii achieves heights of 10 to 50 centimeters (4 to 20 inches).

Stems and leaves
A well-developed, above ground, reddish colored stem. The leaves are lobed and have a 'crisped' appearance by being irregularly curled or twisted. Leaves closer to the base are often reddish and attached directly to the stem with stalks from 2 to 5 centimeters (0.79 to 1.97 inches) long. Leaves have an oblong shape sometimes spatulate tipped, 5 to 13 centimeters (2.0 to 5.1 inches) long and 1 - 2 centimeters wide. Higher up the stem, the leaves are smaller 2 to 5 centimeters (0.79 to 1.97 inches) long and 3 to 10 millimeters wide.

Flowers
Flower heads have a flat circular shape and are held straight up by the plant. They appear in clusters of 2 to 6 which grow upward from various points on the main stem to approximately the same height with the outer flowers opening first. The phyllaries are purplish. There are no ray florets and the disc florets are purple or mauve colored.

Fruits
Achenes 3 to 4 millimeters long, ribbed and not hairy. Pappus 6 to 7 millimeters long.
