= Lixophaga angusta =

Scientific classification
- Kingdom: Animalia
- Phylum: Arthropoda
- Clade: Pancrustacea
- Class: Insecta
- Order: Diptera
- Family: Tachinidae
- Genus: Lixophaga
- Species: L. angusta

Binomial name
- Lixophaga angusta (Townsend, 1927)

Synonyms
- Actinotachina angusta Townsend, 1927

Species of fly

Lixophaga angusta is a species of tachinid flies in the genus Lixophaga of the family Tachinidae.
