= Calodexia rubripes =

Scientific classification
- Kingdom: Animalia
- Phylum: Arthropoda
- Class: Insecta
- Order: Diptera
- Family: Tachinidae
- Subfamily: Exoristinae
- Tribe: Blondeliini
- Genus: Calodexia
- Species: C. rubripes

Binomial name
- Calodexia rubripes Thompson, 1968

Species of fly

Calodexia rubripes is a species of fly in the family Tachinidae.

== Distribution ==
Trinidad.
