= Erythromelana glenriverai =

Scientific classification
- Kingdom: Animalia
- Phylum: Arthropoda
- Class: Insecta
- Order: Diptera
- Family: Tachinidae
- Subfamily: Exoristinae
- Tribe: Blondeliini
- Genus: Erythromelana
- Species: E. glenriverai

Binomial name
- Erythromelana glenriverai Fleming & Wood, 2015

Species of fly

Erythromelana glenriverai is a species of fly in the family Tachinidae.

== Distribution ==
Costa Rica.
