= Houghia maris =

Scientific classification
- Kingdom: Animalia
- Phylum: Arthropoda
- Class: Insecta
- Order: Diptera
- Family: Tachinidae
- Subfamily: Exoristinae
- Tribe: Goniini
- Genus: Houghia
- Species: H. maris

Binomial name
- Houghia maris (Townsend, 1929)

Synonyms
- Actinoprosopa maris Townsend, 1929

Species of fly

Houghia maris is a species of tachinid flies in the genus Houghia of the family Tachinidae. It was first described from São Paulo, Brazil by Charles Henry Tyler Townsend in 1929. It was originally placed in the genus Actinoprosopa, which became a synonym of Houghia in 2014.

== Distribution ==
Brazil.
