= Anisia flaveola =

Scientific classification
- Kingdom: Animalia
- Phylum: Arthropoda
- Class: Insecta
- Order: Diptera
- Family: Tachinidae
- Subfamily: Exoristinae
- Tribe: Blondeliini
- Genus: Anisia
- Species: A. flaveola

Binomial name
- Anisia flaveola (Coquillett, 1897)

Synonyms
- Hypostena flaveola Coquillett, 1897

Species of fly

Anisia flaveola is a species of fly in the family Tachinidae.

== Distribution ==
Canada, United States.
