= Erica trimera =

Scientific classification
- Kingdom: Plantae
- Clade: Tracheophytes
- Clade: Angiosperms
- Clade: Eudicots
- Clade: Asterids
- Order: Ericales
- Family: Ericaceae
- Genus: Erica
- Species: E. trimera

Binomial name
- Erica trimera (Engl.) Beentje (1990)

Synonyms
- Philippia trimera Engl. (1895)

Species of flowering plant

Erica trimera is a species of flowering plant. It is a shrub or tree which grows in the mountains of eastern and central Africa.

== Description ==
Erica trimera is an evergreen shrub or tree which grows from .4 to 12 meters in height, with a many-branching habit. It has small leaves, 1 to 7–10 mm long and 0.4 to 1.4 wide, which are generally smooth with tiny hairs along the margins. Flowers grow in clusters of 4 to 12 at branch ends.

== Range and habitat ==
Erica trimera is native to the mountains of Eastern and Central Africa, ranging from Ethiopia through Kenya, Uganda, Tanzania, and the northeastern Democratic Republic of the Congo. It is native to high-elevation areas of the mountains, including the Ethiopian Highlands in Ethiopia, Mount Elgon and Mount Kenya in Kenya, Mount Meru and Mount Kilimanjaro in Tanzania, and the Rwenzori Mountains on the border of Uganda and the Democratic Republic of the Congo. It is typically found in the subalpine ericaceous belt, a transitional zone between the Afromontane forests and the higher-elevation Afroalpine grasslands and shrublands, from approximately 3000 to 4000 meters elevation. In the ericaceous belt it is often co-dominant with Erica arborea, and can form dense thickets or low forests.

== Subspecies ==
Six subspecies are recognized:

- Erica trimera subsp. abyssinica (Pic.Serm. & Heiniger) Dorr – Ethiopian Highlands in Ethiopia
- Erica trimera subsp. elgonensis (Mildbr.) Beentje – Mount Elgon in Kenya
- Erica trimera subsp. keniensis (S.Moore) Beentje – Mount Kenya in Kenya
- Erica trimera subsp. kilimanjarica (Hedberg) Beentje – Mount Meru and Kilimanjaro in Tanzania
- Erica trimera subsp. meruensis (R.Ross) Beentje – Mount Meru and Mount Loolmalasin in Tanzania
- Erica trimera subsp. trimera – Ruwenzori Mountains of Uganda and Democratic Republic of the Congo
