= Myiopharus punctilucis =

Scientific classification
- Kingdom: Animalia
- Phylum: Arthropoda
- Class: Insecta
- Order: Diptera
- Family: Tachinidae
- Subfamily: Exoristinae
- Tribe: Blondeliini
- Genus: Myiopharus
- Species: M. punctilucis

Binomial name
- Myiopharus punctilucis (Townsend, 1927)

Synonyms
- Hemiargyrophylax punctilucis Townsend, 1927

Species of fly

Myiopharus punctilucis is a species of tachinid flies in the genus Myiopharus of the family Tachinidae.

== Distribution ==
They are found in Peru.
