= Eucelatoria claripalpis =

Scientific classification
- Kingdom: Animalia
- Phylum: Arthropoda
- Class: Insecta
- Order: Diptera
- Family: Tachinidae
- Subfamily: Exoristinae
- Tribe: Blondeliini
- Genus: Eucelatoria
- Species: E. claripalpis

Binomial name
- Eucelatoria claripalpis (Thompson, 1968)

Synonyms
- Dexodiopsis claripalpis Thompson, 1968

Species of fly

Eucelatoria claripalpis is a species of fly in the family Tachinidae.

== Distribution ==
Trinidad.
