= Eucelatoria texana =

Scientific classification
- Kingdom: Animalia
- Phylum: Arthropoda
- Class: Insecta
- Order: Diptera
- Family: Tachinidae
- Subfamily: Exoristinae
- Tribe: Blondeliini
- Genus: Eucelatoria
- Species: E. texana

Binomial name
- Eucelatoria texana (Reinhard, 1923)

Synonyms
- Dexodes insignis Reinhard, 1934; Xiphomyia texana Reinhard, 1923

Species of fly

Eucelatoria texana is a species of fly in the family Tachinidae.

== Distribution ==
United States.
