= Eucelatoria bryani =

Scientific classification
- Kingdom: Animalia
- Phylum: Arthropoda
- Class: Insecta
- Order: Diptera
- Family: Tachinidae
- Subfamily: Exoristinae
- Tribe: Blondeliini
- Genus: Eucelatoria
- Species: E. bryani

Binomial name
- Eucelatoria bryani Sabrosky, 1981

Synonyms
- Hemilydella bryani Sabrosky, 1981

Species of fly

Eucelatoria bryani is a species of fly in the family Tachinidae.

== Distribution ==
El Salvador, Honduras, Mexico, Nicaragua, United States.
