= Calodexia majuscula =

Scientific classification
- Kingdom: Animalia
- Phylum: Arthropoda
- Class: Insecta
- Order: Diptera
- Family: Tachinidae
- Subfamily: Exoristinae
- Tribe: Blondeliini
- Genus: Calodexia
- Species: C. majuscula

Binomial name
- Calodexia majuscula Wulp, 1891

Species of fly

Calodexia majuscula is a species of fly in the family Tachinidae.

== Distribution ==
Mexico.
