= Lixophaga aberrans =

Scientific classification
- Domain: Eukaryota
- Kingdom: Animalia
- Phylum: Arthropoda
- Class: Insecta
- Order: Diptera
- Family: Tachinidae
- Genus: Lixophaga
- Species: L. aberrans

Binomial name
- Lixophaga aberrans (Townsend, 1929)

Synonyms
- Actinotachina aberrans Townsend, 1929

Species of fly

Lixophaga aberrans is a species of tachinid fly in the genus Lixophaga of the family Tachinidae.
