= Thelairodoria setinervis =

Scientific classification
- Kingdom: Animalia
- Phylum: Arthropoda
- Class: Insecta
- Order: Diptera
- Family: Tachinidae
- Subfamily: Exoristinae
- Tribe: Blondeliini
- Genus: Thelairodoria
- Species: T. setinervis

Binomial name
- Thelairodoria setinervis (Coquillett, 1910)

Synonyms
- Exorista setinervis Coquillett, 1910; Thelairodoria floscula Reinhard, 1958

Species of fly

Thelairodoria setinervis is a species of bristle fly in the family Tachinidae.

== Species ==
United States.
