= Vibrissina turrita =

Scientific classification
- Kingdom: Animalia
- Phylum: Arthropoda
- Class: Insecta
- Order: Diptera
- Family: Tachinidae
- Subfamily: Exoristinae
- Tribe: Blondeliini
- Genus: Vibrissina
- Species: V. turrita

Binomial name
- Vibrissina turrita (Meigen, 1824)

Synonyms
- Masicera minor Perris, 1852; Tachina turrita Meigen, 1824

Species of fly

Vibrissina turrita is a species of fly in the family Tachinidae.

== Distribution ==
Czech Republic, Hungary, Poland, Slovakia, Sweden, Andorra, Bulgaria, Greece, Italy, Serbia, Turkey, Austria, France, Germany, Netherlands, Switzerland, Japan, South Korea, Russia, Transcaucasia, China, Taiwan.
