= Lixophaga townsendi =

Scientific classification
- Domain: Eukaryota
- Kingdom: Animalia
- Phylum: Arthropoda
- Class: Insecta
- Order: Diptera
- Family: Tachinidae
- Genus: Lixophaga
- Species: L. townsendi

Binomial name
- Lixophaga townsendi (Guimarães, 1971)

Synonyms
- Actinophryno angusta Townsend, 1928; Actinotachina townsendi Guimarães, 1971

Species of fly

Lixophaga townsendi is a species of tachinid flies in the genus Lixophaga of the family Tachinidae.
