= Eucelatoria occulta =

Scientific classification
- Kingdom: Animalia
- Phylum: Arthropoda
- Clade: Pancrustacea
- Class: Insecta
- Order: Diptera
- Family: Tachinidae
- Subfamily: Exoristinae
- Tribe: Blondeliini
- Genus: Eucelatoria
- Species: E. occulta

Binomial name
- Eucelatoria occulta (Wulp, 1890)

Synonyms
- Telothyria occulta Wulp, 1890

Species of fly

Eucelatoria occulta is a species of fly in the family Tachinidae.
