= Houghia setipennis =

Scientific classification
- Kingdom: Animalia
- Phylum: Arthropoda
- Class: Insecta
- Order: Diptera
- Family: Tachinidae
- Subfamily: Exoristinae
- Tribe: Goniini
- Genus: Houghia
- Species: H. setipennis

Binomial name
- Houghia setipennis Coquillett, 1897

Species of fly

Houghia setipennis is a species of tachinid flies in the genus Houghia of the family Tachinidae.

== Distribution ==
United States.
