= Mimulopsis arborescens =

Scientific classification
- Kingdom: Plantae
- Clade: Tracheophytes
- Clade: Angiosperms
- Clade: Eudicots
- Clade: Asterids
- Order: Lamiales
- Family: Acanthaceae
- Genus: Mimulopsis
- Species: M. arborescens

Binomial name
- Mimulopsis arborescens C.B.Clarke

Species of tree

Mimulopsis arborescens is a tree from the family Acanthaceae and a species of the genus Mimulopsis. This tree is one of the species that can be found at Rwenzori Mountains.
