= Italispidea antennalis =

Scientific classification
- Kingdom: Animalia
- Phylum: Arthropoda
- Class: Insecta
- Order: Diptera
- Family: Tachinidae
- Subfamily: Exoristinae
- Tribe: Blondeliini
- Genus: Italispidea
- Species: I. antennalis

Binomial name
- Italispidea antennalis Townsend, 1927

Species of fly

Italispidea antennalis is a species of fly in the family Tachinidae. It is found in Brazil.
