= Eucelatoria armigera =

Scientific classification
- Kingdom: Animalia
- Phylum: Arthropoda
- Class: Insecta
- Order: Diptera
- Family: Tachinidae
- Subfamily: Exoristinae
- Tribe: Blondeliini
- Genus: Eucelatoria
- Species: E. armigera

Binomial name
- Eucelatoria armigera (Coquillett, 1889)

Synonyms
- Tachina armigera Coquillett, 1889

Species of fly

Eucelatoria armigera is a species of fly in the family Tachinidae.

== Distribution ==
United States, Cuba, Puerto Rico, Mexico, Colombia, Venezuela, West Indies, Hawaii.
