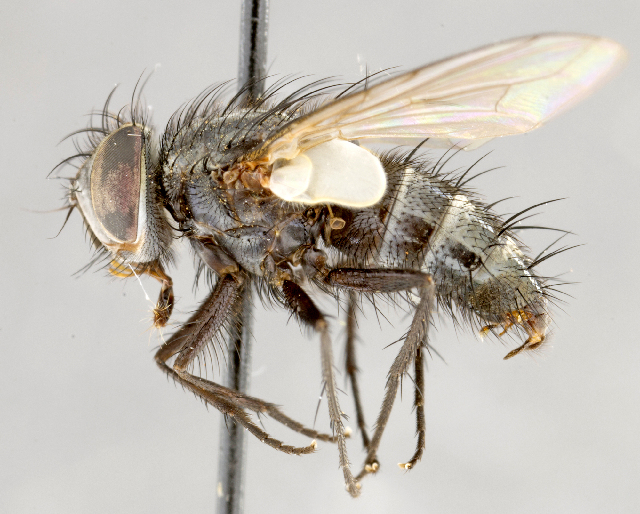

Scientific classification
- Kingdom: Animalia
- Phylum: Arthropoda
- Class: Insecta
- Order: Diptera
- Family: Tachinidae
- Genus: Myiopharus
- Species: M. doryphorae

Binomial name
- Myiopharus doryphorae (Riley, 1869)

Synonyms
- Exorista aerata Coquillett, 1897; Tachina tricincta Walker, 1853

= Myiopharus doryphorae =

Species of fly

Myiopharus doryphorae (formerly Doryphorophaga doryphorae) is a species of fly in the family Tachinidae. It is native to North America, and has a current distribution ranging from British Columbia and Nova Scotia in the north to Arizona, Mexico and South Carolina in the south.

This fly is one of the main native, relatively specific parasitoid insects of the Colorado potato beetle in North America. Its life cycle takes place in successive larval stages of the host. Its final stage occurs underground inside the nymph of the beetle.

This species has been studied for use in biological control of the Colorado potato beetle.
