= Lixophaga =

Scientific classification
- Kingdom: Animalia
- Phylum: Arthropoda
- Class: Insecta
- Order: Diptera
- Family: Tachinidae
- Subfamily: Exoristinae
- Tribe: Blondeliini
- Genus: Lixophaga; Townsend, 1908

Type species
- Lixophaga parva Townsend, 1908

Synonyms
- Lyxophaga Townsend, 1936; Euzenillia Townsend, 1911; Euzenilla Townsend, 1912; Microceromasia Villeneuve, 1911; Urophyllopsis Townsend, 1916; Euzenilliopsis Townsend, 1916; Phrynofrontina Townsend, 1919; Chaquimayoia Townsend, 1927; Epiprospherysa Townsend, 1927; Paranetia Townsend, 1927; Prophorinia Townsend, 1927; Actinotachina Townsend, 1927; Ptilolydella Townsend, 1927; Lydellactia Townsend, 1927; Biohypostena Townsend, 1927; Cataphorinia Townsend, 1927; Itabiomyia Townsend, 1927; Paraprospherysa Townsend, 1927; Chrysoprospherysa Townsend, 1928; Euprospherysa Townsend, 1928; Actinophryno Townsend, 1928; Erycioides Curran, 1930; Plaxactia Townsend, 1931; Prolixophaga Townsend, 1934; Polybiophila Curran, 1937; Messiomyia Reinhard, 1955; Talparomyia Thompson, 1968; Santacruzia Thompson, 1968; Cataphoriniopsis Thompson, 1968; Pseudoprospherysa Thompson, 1968; Dexodioidea Thompson, 1968; Braziliomyia Thompson, 1968; Conoptina Richter, 1995

Genus of flies

Lixophaga is a genus of flies in the family Tachinidae.

== Species ==
- Lixophaga aberrans (Townsend, 1929)
- Lixophaga alberta (Curran, 1925)
- Lixophaga albidula (Wulp, 1890)
- Lixophaga angusta (Townsend, 1927)
- Lixophaga aristalis (Townsend, 1927)
- Lixophaga aurata (Blanchard, 1937)
- Lixophaga aurea (Thompson, 1968)
- Lixophaga beardsleyi Hardy, 1981
- Lixophaga brasiliana (Townsend, 1927)
- Lixophaga caledonia (Curran, 1929)
- Lixophaga charapensis (Townsend, 1927)
- Lixophaga cincta (Walker, 1853)
- Lixophaga cinctella (Mesnil, 1957)
- Lixophaga cinerea Yang, 1988
- Lixophaga claripalpis (Thompson, 1968)
- Lixophaga clausa (Townsend, 1927)
- Lixophaga croesus (Townsend, 1928)
- Lixophaga diatraeae (Townsend, 1916)
- Lixophaga discalis (Coquillett, 1902)
- Lixophaga dubiosa (Thompson, 1968)
- Lixophaga dyscerae Shi, 1991
- Lixophaga facialis (Townsend, 1931)
- Lixophaga fallax Mesnil, 1963
- Lixophaga famelica (Wiedemann, 1830)
- Lixophaga fasciata Curran, 1930
- Lixophaga fitzgeraldi (Curran, 1937)
- Lixophaga flavescens (Wulp, 1890)
- Lixophaga fulvescens (Townsend, 1927)
- Lixophaga fumipennis (Townsend, 1927)
- Lixophaga galbae (Thompson, 1968)
- Lixophaga grisea (Curran, 1926)
- Lixophaga impatiens (Curran, 1925)
- Lixophaga jennei Aldrich, 1926
- Lixophaga latigena Shima, 1979
- Lixophaga leucophaea (Wulp, 1890)
- Lixophaga limoniina (Richter, 1995)
- Lixophaga mediocris Aldrich, 1925
- Lixophaga neglecta (Wulp, 1890)
- Lixophaga nigrocincta (Wulp, 1890)
- Lixophaga nubilosa (Wulp, 1890)
- Lixophaga obscura (Thompson, 1968)
- Lixophaga opaca (Wulp, 1890)
- Lixophaga opsiangusta Nihei & Dios, 2016 (new name for Lixophaga angusta (Townsend, 1927) (Cataphorinia))
- Lixophaga orbitalis Aldrich, 1926
- Lixophaga pacata (Wulp, 1890)
- Lixophaga parva Townsend, 1908
- Lixophaga plumbea Aldrich, 1925
- Lixophaga plumosula (Townsend, 1927)
- Lixophaga pollinosa (Thompson, 1968)
- Lixophaga proletaria (Townsend, 1927)
- Lixophaga punctata (Townsend, 1927)
- Lixophaga puscolulo Carrejo & Woodley, 2013
- Lixophaga remissa (Wulp, 1890)
- Lixophaga remora Reinhard, 1953
- Lixophaga retiniae (Coquillett, 1897)
- Lixophaga santacruzi (Thompson, 1968)
- Lixophaga scintilla Reinhard, 1953
- Lixophaga similis (Wulp, 1890)
- Lixophaga similis (Thompson, 1968)
- Lixophaga simplex (Walker, 1858)
- Lixophaga solitaria (Curran, 1926)
- Lixophaga sphenophori (Villeneuve, 1911)
- Lixophaga stenomae Curran, 1935
- Lixophaga subtilis (Wulp, 1890)
- Lixophaga tenuis (Blanchard, 1959)
- Lixophaga thompsoniana Nihei & Dios, 2016 (new name for Lixophaga fumipennis (Thompson, 1968))
- Lixophaga thoracica (Curran, 1930)
- Lixophaga townsendi Guimarães, 1971
- Lixophaga townsendiana Nihei & Dios, 2016 (new name for Lixophaga fumipennis (Townsend, 1928))
- Lixophaga trichosoma (Wulp, 1890)
- Lixophaga triconis (Reinhard, 1955)
- Lixophaga umbrina (Wulp, 1890)
- Lixophaga umbripennis (Wulp, 1890)
- Lixophaga unicolor (Smith, 1917)
- Lixophaga usta (Giglio-Tos, 1893)
- Lixophaga variabilis (Coquillett, 1895)
- Lixophaga villeneuvei (Baranov, 1934)
