= Houghia =

Scientific classification
- Kingdom: Animalia
- Phylum: Arthropoda
- Class: Insecta
- Order: Diptera
- Family: Tachinidae
- Subfamily: Exoristinae
- Tribe: Goniini
- Genus: Houghia; Coquillett, 1897

Type species
- Houghia setipennis Coquillett, 1897

Synonyms
- Actinoprosopa Townsend, 1927; Agrarialia Curran, 1934; Anhangabahuia Townsend, 1931; Bolohoughia Townsend, 1927; Carceliocephala Townsend, 1934; Chrysohoughia Townsend, 1935; Eumacrohoughia Townsend, 1927; Eumasicera Townsend, 1909; Macrohoughia Townsend, 1927; Orohoughia Townsend, 1934; Pacidianus Reinhard, 1943; Pammaerus Aldrich, 1927; Petrargyrops Townsend, 1927; Sisyrohoughia Townsend, 1927; Tapajohoughia Townsend, 1934; Verrugomyia Townsend, 1927

Genus of flies

Houghia is a genus of flies in the family Tachinidae.

== Species ==
- Houghia aerata Fleming & Wood, 2014
- Houghia analis (Townsend, 1931) (Synonym: Anhangabahuia analis Townsend, 1931)
- Houghia approximata (Wulp, 1890) (Synonym: Anisia approximata van der Wulp, 1890)
- Houghia aurata (Townsend, 1934)
- Houghia aurifera Fleming & Wood, 2014
- Houghia aurometallica (Townsend, 1927) (Synonym: Bolohoughia aurometallica Townsend, 1927)
- Houghia biseriata Fleming & Wood, 2014
- Houghia bistrigata (Wulp, 1890) (Synonym: Masicera bistrigata van der Wulp, 1890)
- Houghia bivittata Fleming & Wood, 2014
- Houghia blancoi Fleming & Wood, 2014
- Houghia brevipilosa Fleming & Wood, 2014
- Houghia calcarata (Wulp, 1890) (Synonym: Masicera calcarata van der Wulp, 1890)
- Houghia chavarriae Fleming & Wood, 2014
- Houghia chlorescens (Townsend, 1935) (Synonym: Chrysohoughia chlorescens Townsend, 1935)
- Houghia coccidella (Townsend, 1909)(Synonyms: Eumasicera coccidella Townsend, 1909, Pacidianus hirsutus Reinhard, 1943)
- Houghia confinis Fleming & Wood, 2014
- Houghia crypta (Townsend, 1934) (Synonym: Carceliocephala crypta Townsend, 1934)
- Houghia delospilota Fleming & Wood, 2014
- Houghia destituta Fleming & Wood, 2014
- Houghia facialis (Townsend, 1929) (Synonym: Actinoprosopa facialis Townsend, 1927)
- Houghia fimbriata Fleming & Wood, 2014
- Houghia gracilis Fleming & Wood, 2014
- Houghia graciloides Fleming & Wood, 2014
- Houghia griseifrons Fleming & Wood, 2014
- Houghia impedita (Wulp, 1890) (Synonym: Masicera impedita van der Wulp, 1890)
- Houghia inflatipalpis Fleming & Wood, 2014
- Houghia lateralis (Curran, 1934) (Synonym: Aridalia lateralis Curran, 1934)
- Houghia latigena Fleming & Wood, 2014
- Houghia latilobus Fleming & Wood, 2014
- Houghia leptitrichopus (Brauer & von Berganstamm, 1891) (Synonyms: Sisyropa leptotrichopa Brauer & Bergenstamm, 1891, Pammaerus leptotrichopa (Brauer & Bergenstamm, 1891), Sturmia orbitalis Curran, 1934, Houghia orbitalis (Curran, 1934))
- Houghia longicercus Fleming & Wood, 2014
- Houghia longipilosa Fleming & Wood, 2014
- Houghia luteiventris Fleming & Wood, 2014
- Houghia macilenta Fleming & Wood, 2014
- Houghia marini Fleming & Wood, 2014
- Houghia maris (Townsend, 1929) (Synonym: Actinoprosopa maris Townsend, 1929)
- Houghia marmorata (Townsend, 1927)
- Houghia matarritai Fleming & Wood, 2014
- Houghia minor Thompson, 1963 (Synonym: Eumacrohoughia minor Thompson, 1963)
- Houghia nigripalpis Reinhard, 1967
- Houghia nigrofemur Fleming & Wood, 2014
- Houghia nuda (Townsend, 1927) (Synonym: Eumacrohoughia nuda Townsend, 1927)
- Houghia ochrofemur Fleming & Wood, 2014
- Houghia omissa Fleming & Wood, 2014
- Houghia orbitalis (Townsend, 1927) (Synonym: Verrugomyia orbitalis Townsend, 1927)
- Houghia pallida Fleming & Wood, 2014
- Houghia parmata Fleming & Wood, 2014
- Houghia parva (Townsend, 1935) (Synonym: Pararrhinactia parva Townsend, 1935)
- Houghia pilosifrons Fleming & Wood, 2014
- Houghia plagioides (Wulp, 1890)
- Houghia punctiger (Townsend, 1927) (Synonym: Petrargyrops punctiger Townsend, 1927)
- Houghia quadra (Wiedemann, 1830) (Synonyms: Tachina quadra Wiedemann, 1830, Pammaerus quadra (Wiedemann, 1830))
- Houghia romeroae Fleming & Wood, 2014
- Houghia setinervis (Coquillett, 1898) (Synonym: Hypostena setinervis Coquillett, 1898)
- Houghia setipennis Coquillett, 1897
- Houghia sexmaculata Fleming & Wood, 2014
- Houghia sexualis (Curran, 1934) (Synonym: Agrarialia sexualis Curran, 1934)
- Houghia similima (Thompson, 1963) (Synonym: Carceliocephala simillima Thompson, 1963)
- Houghia similis (Townsend, 1927) (Synonym: Sisyrohoughia similis Townsend, 1927)
- Houghia sordida (Wulp, 1890) (Synonym: Masicera sordida van der Wulp, 1890)
- Houghia spathulata Fleming & Wood, 2014
- Houghia sternalis (Coquillett, 1897) (Synonyms: Sturmia sternalis Coquillett, 1897, Pacidianus persimilis Reinhard, 1943)
- Houghia tenuiseta (Macquart, 1846) (Synonym: Masicera tenuiseta Macquart, 1846)
- Houghia triangularis Fleming & Wood, 2014
- Houghia tropica (Townsend, 1934) (Synonym: Tapajohoughia tropica Townsend, 1934)
- Houghia velutina Fleming & Wood, 2014

H. baccharis Reinhard, 1922 was moved to Microsillus (now a synonym of Siphosturmia).
