= Myiopharus frontalis =

Scientific classification
- Kingdom: Animalia
- Phylum: Arthropoda
- Clade: Pancrustacea
- Class: Insecta
- Order: Diptera
- Family: Tachinidae
- Genus: Myiopharus
- Species: M. frontalis

Binomial name
- Myiopharus frontalis (Townsend, 1927)

Synonyms
- Hemiargyropsis frontalis Townsend, 1927

Species of fly

Myiopharus frontalis is a species of tachinid fly in the genus Myiopharus of the family Tachinidae.
