= Italispidea =

Scientific classification
- Kingdom: Animalia
- Phylum: Arthropoda
- Class: Insecta
- Order: Diptera
- Family: Tachinidae
- Subfamily: Exoristinae
- Tribe: Blondeliini
- Genus: Italispidea; Townsend, 1927

Type species
- Italispidea antennalis Townsend, 1927

Synonyms
- Caenisoma Townsend, 1927; Euclausicella Townsend, 1927

Genus of flies

Italispidea is a genus of flies in the family Tachinidae.

== Species ==
- Italispidea antennalis Townsend, 1927
- Italispidea charapense (Townsend, 1927)
- Italispidea gagatina (Wulp, 1890)
- Italispidea uruhuasi (Townsend, 1927)
