= Thelairodoria =

Scientific classification
- Kingdom: Animalia
- Phylum: Arthropoda
- Class: Insecta
- Order: Diptera
- Family: Tachinidae
- Subfamily: Exoristinae
- Tribe: Blondeliini
- Genus: Thelairodoria; Townsend, 1927

Type species
- Thelairodoria thrix Townsend, 1927

Genus of flies

Thelairodoria is a genus of parasitic flies in the family Tachinidae.

== Species ==
- Thelairodoria exilis (Wulp, 1890)
- Thelairodoria ophthalmica (Wulp, 1890)
- Thelairodoria setinervis (Coquillett, 1910)
- Thelairodoria thrix Townsend, 1927
