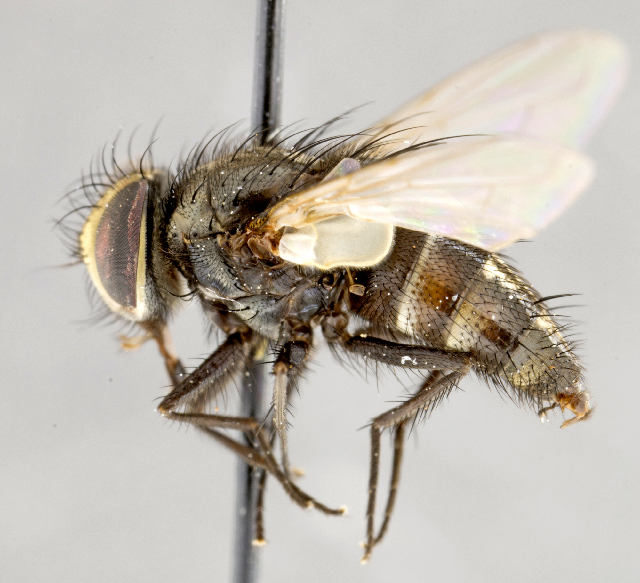
- Myiopharus infernalis

Scientific classification
- Kingdom: Animalia
- Phylum: Arthropoda
- Class: Insecta
- Order: Diptera
- Family: Tachinidae
- Subfamily: Exoristinae
- Tribe: Blondeliini
- Genus: Myiopharus; Brauer & von Bergenstamm, 1889

Type species
- Myiopharus metopia Brauer & von Bergenstamm, 1889

Synonyms
- Adoryphorophaga Townsend, 1931; Anoxynopsella Townsend, 1935; Apacheprospherysa Townsend, 1926; Argyrodoria Townsend, 1927; Bolodoria Townsend, 1927; Didyma Wulp; Didymops Townsend, 1927; Doryphorophaga Townsend, 1912; Epidexiopsis Townsend, 1916; Gymnodoria Townsend, 1927; Hemiargyrophylax Townsend, 1927; Hemiargyropsis Townsend, 1927; Mayophorinia Townsend, 1927; Melanodoria Townsend, 1927; Mesochaeta Brauer & Bergenstamm, 1891; Metadoria Brauer & Bergenstamm, 1893; Metarrhinomyia Townsend, 1927; Muscinothelaira Townsend, 1916; Myioxynops Townsend, 1927; Neoxynopsoidea Thompson, 1968; Oxynopsalia Curran, 1934; Oxynopsis Townsend, 1927; Paradoria Brauer & Bergenstamm, 1891; Paralispe Brauer & Bergenstamm, 1891; Parkeriellus Smith, 1916; Pseudomyothyria Townsend, 1892; Stenochaeta Thompson, 1968; Stomatolydella Townsend, 1919; Tachinophyto Townsend, 1892; Thelyphaenopsis Townsend, 1927

= Myiopharus =

Genus of flies

Myiopharus is a genus of flies in the family Tachinidae.

== Species ==
- Myiopharus aberrans (Townsend, 1916)
- Myiopharus albomarginatus (Wulp, 1890)
- Myiopharus albomicans (Wulp, 1890)
- Myiopharus ambulatrix (Wulp, 1890)
- Myiopharus americanus (Bigot, 1889)
- Myiopharus ancillus (Walker, 1853)
- Myiopharus angustus (Townsend, 1927)
- Myiopharus apicalis (Brèthes, 1920)
- Myiopharus argentata Nihei & Dios, 2016 (new name for Myiopharus argentescens (Townsend, 1935))
- Myiopharus argentescens (Townsend, 1927)
- Myiopharus assimilis (Townsend, 1919)
- Myiopharus atra (Townsend, 1927)
- Myiopharus atratula (Walker, 1853)
- Myiopharus barbatus (Bigot, 1889)
- Myiopharus basilaris (Wulp, 1890)
- Myiopharus brasiliana (Brauer & von Bergenstamm, 1891)
- Myiopharus brasiliensis (Townsend, 1927)
- Myiopharus calyptratus (Williston, 1896)
- Myiopharus canadensis Reinhard, 1945
- Myiopharus capitata (Townsend, 1927)
- Myiopharus carbonarius (Wulp, 1890)
- Myiopharus castanifrons (Bigot, 1889)
- Myiopharus claripalpis (Thompson, 1968)
- Myiopharus connexus (Wulp, 1890)
- Myiopharus conspersus (Wulp, 1890)
- Myiopharus costalis (Walker, 1853)
- Myiopharus crysocephalus (Bigot, 1889)
- Myiopharus dejectus (Wulp, 1890)
- Myiopharus dorsalis (Coquillett, 1898)
- Myiopharus doryphorae (Riley, 1869)
- Myiopharus dubia (Townsend, 1927)
- Myiopharus exiguus (Wulp, 1890)
- Myiopharus fimbricrurus (Wulp, 1890)
- Myiopharus flaviventris (Wulp, 1890)
- Myiopharus floridensis (Townsend, 1892)
- Myiopharus frontalis (Townsend, 1927)
- Myiopharus hemiargyroides (Townsend, 1927)
- Myiopharus huascarayus (Townsend, 1917)
- Myiopharus hyalinipennis (Wulp, 1890)
- Myiopharus hyphena (Townsend, 1927)
- Myiopharus inconspicuus (Wulp, 1890)
- Myiopharus infernalis (Townsend, 1919)
- Myiopharus jamaicensis (Curran, 1928)
- Myiopharus leucocyclus (Wulp, 1890)
- Myiopharus levis (Aldrich & Webber, 1924)
- Myiopharus lutzi (Townsend, 1916)
- Myiopharus macellus (Reinhard, 1935)
- Myiopharus melanoceps (Bigot, 1889)
- Myiopharus meridionalis (Townsend, 1929)
- Myiopharus metopia Brauer & von Bergenstamm, 1889
- Myiopharus moestus (Wulp, 1890)
- Myiopharus murinus (Wulp, 1890)
- Myiopharus nana (Townsend, 1934)
- Myiopharus neilli O’Hara, 2007
- Myiopharus niger (Brauer & von Bergenstamm, 1891)
- Myiopharus nigricolor (Wulp, 1890)
- Myiopharus nigrisquamis (Townsend, 1927)
- Myiopharus nigritus (Wulp, 1890)
- Myiopharus nitidus (Curran, 1934)
- Myiopharus ochrifrons (Wulp, 1890)
- Myiopharus ovatus (Wulp, 1890)
- Myiopharus palpalis (Townsend, 1927)
- Myiopharus palposus (Wulp, 1890)
- Myiopharus parva (Townsend, 1927)
- Myiopharus parvulus (Wulp, 1890)
- Myiopharus paulista (Townsend, 1929)
- Myiopharus pavidus (Wulp, 1890)
- Myiopharus perplexus (Townsend, 1911)
- Myiopharus pirioni Aldrich, 1934
- Myiopharus punctilucis (Townsend, 1927)
- Myiopharus ravus (Wulp, 1890)
- Myiopharus refugus (Wulp, 1890)
- Myiopharus securis Reinhard, 1945
- Myiopharus secutoris (Reinhard, 1975)
- Myiopharus sedulus (Reinhard, 1935)
- Myiopharus subaeneus Aldrich, 1934
- Myiopharus trifurca (Wulp, 1890)
- Myiopharus unicolor (Wulp, 1890)
- Myiopharus volucris (Wulp, 1890)
- Myiopharus vulgata (Walker, 1853)
- Myiopharus yahuarmayana (Townsend, 1927)
- Myiopharus yahuarmayensis (Townsend, 1927)
