= Vibrissina =

Scientific classification
- Kingdom: Animalia
- Phylum: Arthropoda
- Class: Insecta
- Order: Diptera
- Family: Tachinidae
- Subfamily: Exoristinae
- Tribe: Blondeliini
- Genus: Vibrissina; Rondani, 1861

Type species
- Tachina demissa Meigen, 1824

Synonyms
- Microvibrissina Villeneuve, 1911; Spathimeigenia Townsend, 1915; Hylotomomyia Townsend, 1916; Schizocerophaga Townsend, 1916; Jicaltepecia Townsend, 1917; Acemeigenia Townsend, 1927; Hypophylax Townsend, 1935; Neoswaldia Mesnil, 1960

Genus of flies

Vibrissina is a genus of flies in the family Tachinidae.

== Species ==
- Vibrissina aberrans (Wulp, 1890)
- Vibrissina albopicta (Bigot, 1889)
- Vibrissina angustifrons Shima, 1983
- Vibrissina aurata Shima, 1983
- Vibrissina aurifrons (Curran, 1930)
- Vibrissina bilineata (Wulp, 1890)
- Vibrissina bridwelli (Aldrich, 1931)
- Vibrissina buckelli (Curran, 1926)
- Vibrissina candicans (Wulp, 1890)
- Vibrissina carinata (Wulp, 1890)
- Vibrissina curva (Wulp, 1890)
- Vibrissina danmartini Fleming & Wood, 2017
- Vibrissina debilitata (Pandellé, 1896)
- Vibrissina dieloceri (Townsend, 1942)
- Vibrissina dolopis (Reinhard, 1958)
- Vibrissina erecta (Aldrich, 1931)
- Vibrissina fasciata (Wulp, 1890)
- Vibrissina forticula (Wulp, 1890)
- Vibrissina hallwachsorum Fleming & Wood, 2017
- Vibrissina hylotomae (Coquillett, 1898)
- Vibrissina inca (Townsend, 1927)
- Vibrissina insecta (Giglio-Tos, 1893)
- Vibrissina inthanon Shima, 1983
- Vibrissina itaquaquecetubae (Townsend, 1929)
- Vibrissina leibyi (Townsend, 1916)
- Vibrissina leida (Wulp, 1890)
- Vibrissina mexicana (Aldrich, 1931)
- Vibrissina mucorea (Wulp, 1890)
- Vibrissina nigriventris (Smith, 1917)
- Vibrissina obscura (Aldrich, 1931)
- Vibrissina prospheryx (Townsend, 1935)
- Vibrissina rafaela (Townsend, 1917)
- Vibrissina randycurtisi Fleming & Wood, 2017
- Vibrissina randyjonesi Fleming & Wood, 2017
- Vibrissina remota (Wulp, 1890)
- Vibrissina robertwellsi Fleming & Wood, 2017
- Vibrissina scita (Walker, 1853)
- Vibrissina spinigera (Townsend, 1915)
- Vibrissina texensis (Aldrich, 1931)
- Vibrissina turrita (Meigen, 1824)
- Vibrissina vaciva (Wulp, 1890)
- Vibrissina vicina (Wulp, 1890)
- Vibrissina zonata (Bigot, 1889)
