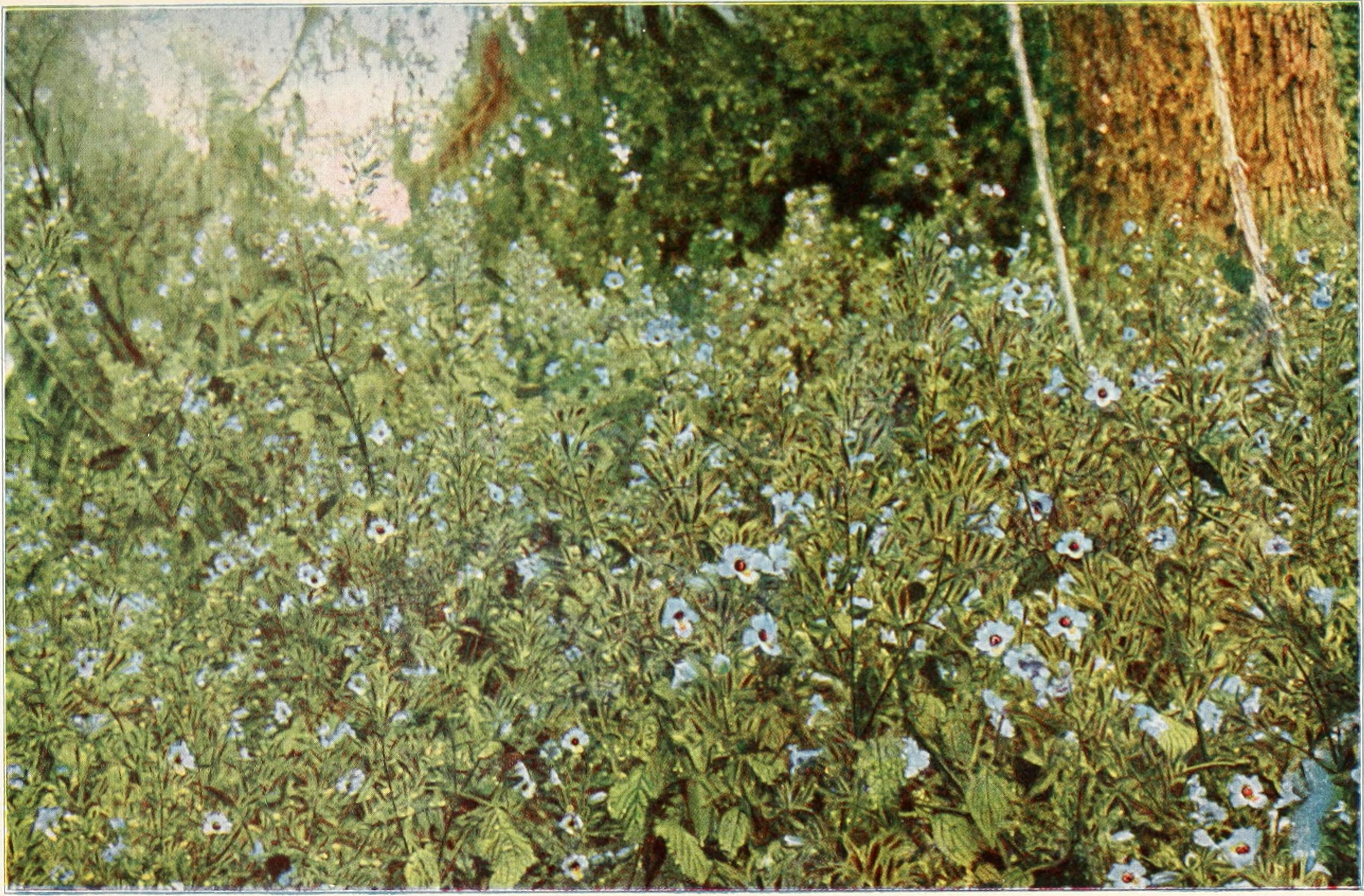
- Mimulopsis violacea, watercolor

Scientific classification
- Kingdom: Plantae
- Clade: Tracheophytes
- Clade: Angiosperms
- Clade: Eudicots
- Clade: Asterids
- Order: Lamiales
- Family: Acanthaceae
- Subfamily: Acanthoideae
- Tribe: Ruellieae
- Genus: Mimulopsis; Schweinf. (1868)

Type species
- Mimulopsis solmsii

Species
- 20; see text

Synonyms
- Epiclastopelma Lindau (1895); Sooia Pócs (1973)

= Mimulopsis =

Genus of flowering plants

Mimulopsis is a genus in the flowering plant family Acanthaceae with about 20 species native to tropical Africa and Madagascar.

== Species ==
20 species are accepted:

- Mimulopsis alpina Chiov.
- Mimulopsis angustata Benoist
- Mimulopsis arborescens C.B.Clarke
- Mimulopsis calcarata (Benoist) E.A.Tripp & I.Darbysh.
- Mimulopsis catati Benoist
- Mimulopsis champluvierae Eb.Fisch.
- Mimulopsis dasyphylla Mildbr.
- Mimulopsis elliotii C.B.Clarke
- Mimulopsis excellens Lindau
- Mimulopsis glandulosa Baker
- Mimulopsis hildebrandtii Lindau
- Mimulopsis kilimandscharica Lindau
- Mimulopsis lyalliana (Nees) Baron
- Mimulopsis macrantha (Mildbr.) E.A.Tripp
- Mimulopsis madagascariensis (Baker) Benoist
- Mimulopsis marronina (Vollesen) E.A.Tripp
- Mimulopsis runssorica Lindau
- Mimulopsis solmsii Schweinf.
- Mimulopsis speciosa Baker
- Mimulopsis volleseniana E.A.Tripp & T.F.Daniel
