= Vibrissina aberrans =

Scientific classification
- Kingdom: Animalia
- Phylum: Arthropoda
- Class: Insecta
- Order: Diptera
- Family: Tachinidae
- Subfamily: Exoristinae
- Tribe: Blondeliini
- Genus: Vibrissina
- Species: V. aberrans

Binomial name
- Vibrissina aberrans (Wulp, 1890)

Synonyms
- Anisia aberrans Wulp, 1890

Species of fly

Vibrissina aberrans is a species of fly in the family Tachinidae.

== Distribution ==
Mexico.
