= Erythromelana abdominalis =

Scientific classification
- Kingdom: Animalia
- Phylum: Arthropoda
- Class: Insecta
- Order: Diptera
- Family: Tachinidae
- Subfamily: Exoristinae
- Tribe: Blondeliini
- Genus: Erythromelana
- Species: E. abdominalis

Binomial name
- Erythromelana abdominalis (Townsend, 1919)

Synonyms
- Minthomyia abdominalis Townsend, 1919

Species of fly

Erythromelana abdominalis is a species of fly in the family Tachinidae, found in South America.

== Distribution ==
Although found in the Andes of Peru and Ecuador, they potentially also inhabit Bolivia and Colombia. The majority of specimens have been found around the Yanayacu Biological Research Station & Center for Creative Studies, in the Napo Province of northern Ecuador. They seem to be restricted to the mountains at modern to high elevations such as 1,500m in Peru and up to 2,600m in Ecuador.

== Description ==
Males are typically between 6.1mm and 6.9mm with a yellow abdomen, 4 (rarely 5) well-developed anteroventral setae on their hind tibia, and round-tipped cerci.

No female specimens have been examined to any great extent yet.
