= Erythromelana =

Scientific classification
- Kingdom: Animalia
- Phylum: Arthropoda
- Class: Insecta
- Order: Diptera
- Family: Tachinidae
- Subfamily: Exoristinae
- Tribe: Blondeliini
- Genus: Erythromelana; Townsend, 1919

Type species
- Erythromelana jaena Townsend, 1919

Synonyms
- Minthomyia Townsend, 1919; Myiodoriops Townsend, 1935

Genus of flies

Erythromelana is a genus of flies in the family Tachinidae.

== Species ==
- Erythromelana abdominalis (Townsend, 1919)
- Erythromelana arciforceps Inclán, 2013
- Erythromelana catarina Inclán, 2013
- Erythromelana convexiforceps Inclán, 2013
- Erythromelana cryptica Inclán, 2013
- Erythromelana curvidfrons Inclán, 2013
- Erythromelana distincta Inclán, 2013
- Erythromelana ecuadoriana Inclán, 2013
- Erythromelana eois Inclán, 2013
- Erythromelana glenriverai Fleming & Wood, 2015
- Erythromelana jaena Townsend, 1919
- Erythromelana jimmychevezi Fleming & Wood, 2015
- Erythromelana leptoforceps Inclán, 2013
- Erythromelana marginalis (Townsend, 1935)
- Erythromelana napensis Inclán, 2013
- Erythromelana nigrithorax (Wulp, 1890)
- Erythromelana obscurifrons (Wulp, 1890)
- Erythromelana woodi Inclán, 2013
