= Project Pressure =

Environmental charity

- Formation: 2008
- Founder: Klaus Thymann
- Website: project-pressure.org

Project Pressure is a charity with an ecological and climate focus. It was founded in 2008. It conducted expeditions and made scientific artworks. In 2019 it created Voices For The Future, an art piece displayed at the UN building in New York City.

== History ==
Project Pressure was founded by Danish explorer and photographer Klaus Thymann in 2008. Since then they have also focused on humanitarian issues shifting to a broader perspective incorporating the climate, ecological and bio-diversity crisis.

== Ongoing ==
In 2015 The Guardian cited a book titled ‘ This Changes Everything' that contrasted a sense of helplessness compared to small amounts of "behavioral changes" that cumulatively make a difference.

Additionally, Project Pressure functions as a content provider for existing partners, communicating on multiple platforms. This includes well-established relationships with progressive governments, museums and cultural organizations, the global mass media, and other public bodies and grassroots organizations such as Fridays For Future.

=== Participants ===
Photographer and fisherman Corey Arnold travelled around the Arctic Archipelago of Svalbard aboard the Polish supply ship Horyzont. Arnold's long periods at sea are evident in his work as it reflects on the interconnectivity between the natural world, the sea, and tidal glaciers.

Michael Benson's work is focused on the intersection of art and science. He uses a variety of image-processing techniques to create composite images from raw data from planetary science archives.

Scott Conarroe's large format photos evoke romantic pictorial traditions while placing the landscape into a contemporary context. Conarroe studies the boundaries devised by Alpine nations, where borderlines are defined by glaciers. His work questions of territorial claim and geopolitical consequences.

Noémie Goudal constructed a large-scale photographic installation printed on biodegradable paper that disintegrates when exposed to water. As the image dissolves, the artificial landscape can be viewed against its natural form, functioning as a reminder of the instability of the seemingly stable as well as a visualization of the accelerating transformations in nature.

Simon Norfolk and Klaus Thymann address financial issues as driving forces behind human adaptation to the changing climate. The title, "Shroud", refers to the melting glacier under its death cloak. In addition, a thermal image time-lapse film was created, showing how glaciers compare to the surrounding landscape by only reacting to long-term temperature changes, as opposed to weather fluctuations. The project was featured in New Scientist and the Los Angeles Times.

=== Meltdown ===
In 2018, the first chapter of expeditions and content was completed. The work was gathered into the exhibition Meltdown – Visualizing Climate Change, which premiered at the Natural History Museum, Vienna in 2019. Meltdown is a travelling exhibition with interactive features. The target audience is younger people in education and the general public. During the first year of launch (until the COVID-19 pandemic), the venues attracted over 1.5 million visitors. Meltdown is to be shown at Jacopic Gallery, Ljubljana from January to May 2022.

As an example of the exhibition's interactive features, Project Pressure developed a carbon footprint calculator to encourage audience engagement. To learn how carbon-intense their lifestyle is, users answer a series of questions to get an estimate as well as recommendations for improvements to make in areas such as home, transport, energy, food, and Internet usage.

=== Voices For The Future ===
In 2019, Project Pressure was responsible for Voices For The Future, an art piece projected and transmitted on the UN building in New York in the lead up to the UN Climate Action Summit. Voices For The Future showcased the voices of six young activists, including Greta Thunberg, commenting on the climate crisis and the urgent actions that need to be taken to minimize its consequences. The art piece was visualised by Joseph Michael, authored by Klaus Thymann, and soundtracked by musician and artist Brian Eno.

=== Double Miroir ===
In 2025, Project Pressure organised the exhibition Double Miroir at Le Bicolore – Maison du Danemark in Paris. Double Miroir refers to both a scientific concept and a metaphor for climate change—where greenhouse gases act like a double mirror, letting sunlight in but trapping heat, amplifying global warming. It also reflects dual perspectives on the same environmental crisis by the two artists in the show.

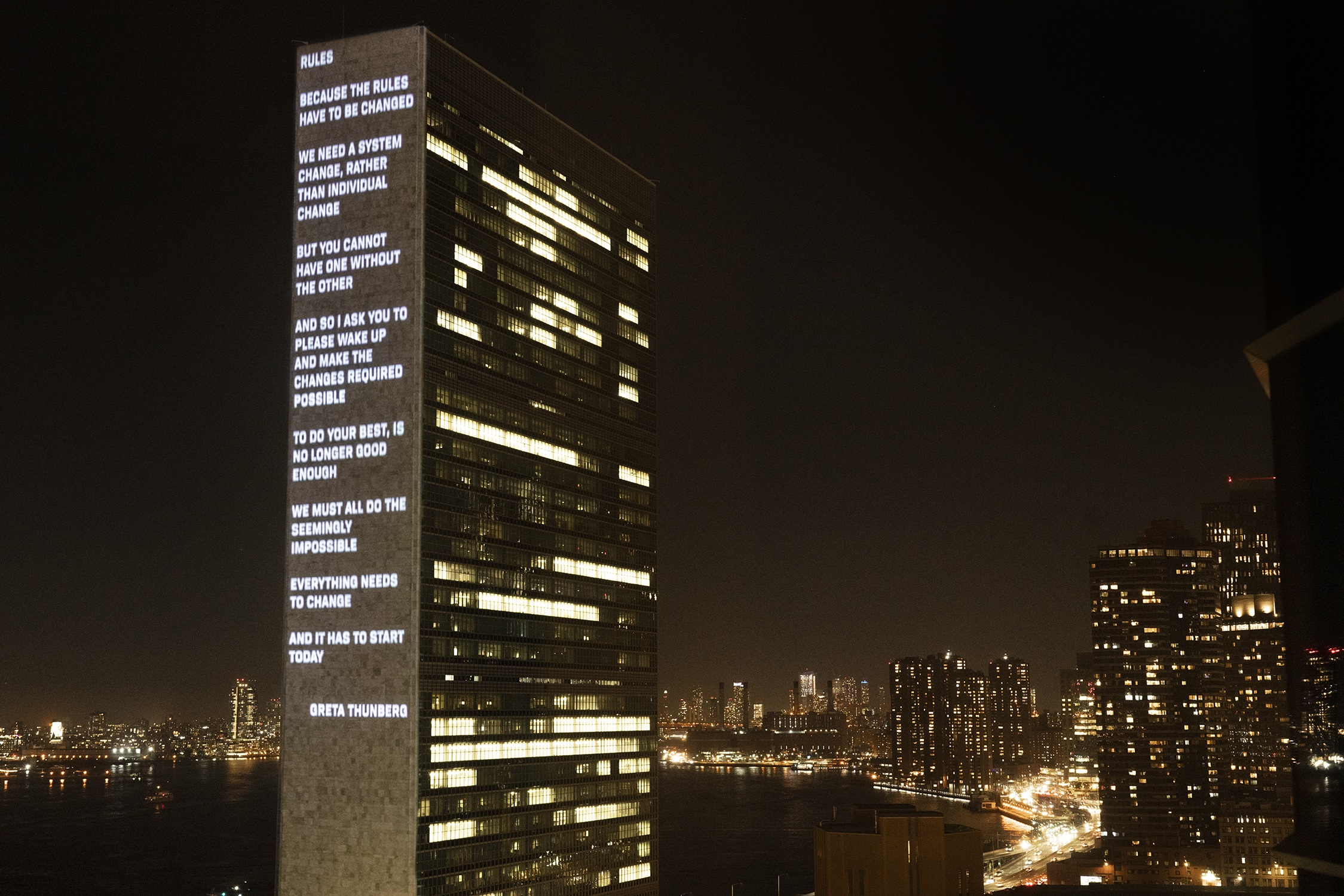
Project Pressure's Voices For The Future (photo: Klaus Thymann)
