= Calodexia =

Scientific classification
- Kingdom: Animalia
- Phylum: Arthropoda
- Class: Insecta
- Order: Diptera
- Family: Tachinidae
- Subfamily: Exoristinae
- Tribe: Blondeliini
- Genus: Calodexia; Wulp, 1891

Type species
- Calodexia majuscula Wulp, 1891

Synonyms
- Calothelaira Townsend, 1927; Chaetonalia Curran, 1934; Eucalodexia Townsend, 1908; Euoestrogaster Townsend, 1935; Euoestrogastrodes Townsend, 1935; Monoestrogaster Townsend, 1939; Nicetria Reinhard, 1953; Oestrogaster Townsend, 1912; Oestrogastrodes Townsend, 1915; Oestrogastropsis Townsend, 1915; Ommaleskia Townsend, 1917; Parathelaira Townsend, 1919

Genus of flies

Calodexia is a Neotropical genus of parasitic flies in the family Tachinidae. Females follow columns of army ants, apparently waiting for cockroaches to be flushed from hiding.

== Species ==
- Calodexia agilis Curran, 1934
- Calodexia aldrichi Curran, 1934
- Calodexia apicalis Curran, 1934
- Calodexia bella Curran, 1934
- Calodexia bequaerti Curran, 1934
- Calodexia bigoti Nihei & Dios, 2016
- Calodexia callani Thompson, 1968
- Calodexia caudata Curran, 1934
- Calodexia continua Curran, 1934
- Calodexia dives Curran, 1934
- Calodexia fasciata Curran, 1934
- Calodexia flavescens (Townsend, 1935)
- Calodexia flavicornis (Wulp, 1890)
- Calodexia flavipes (Schiner, 1868)
- Calodexia fulvibasis Curran, 1934
- Calodexia fumosa (Townsend, 1912)
- Calodexia fuscus (Townsend, 1935)
- Calodexia globosa (Reinhard, 1953)
- Calodexia grata (Wulp, 1890)
- Calodexia insolita Curran, 1934
- Calodexia interrupta Curran, 1934
- Calodexia lateralis (Curran, 1934)
- Calodexia major Curran, 1934
- Calodexia majuscula Wulp, 1891
- Calodexia mattoensis (Townsend, 1939)
- Calodexia mexicana (Townsend, 1915)
- Calodexia neofumosa Nihei & Dios, 2016
- Calodexia nigripes Thompson, 1968
- Calodexia panamensis Curran, 1934
- Calodexia panamensis (Townsend, 1919)
- Calodexia peponis (Reinhard, 1953)
- Calodexia rubripes Thompson, 1968
- Calodexia scurra (Wulp, 1890)
- Calodexia signata (Wulp, 1890)
- Calodexia similis (Townsend, 1915)
- Calodexia strigosa (Wulp, 1890)
- Calodexia townsendi Curran, 1934
- Calodexia valera Curran, 1934
- Calodexia varia Curran, 1934
- Calodexia venteris Curran, 1934
