= Eucelatoria =

Scientific classification
- Kingdom: Animalia
- Phylum: Arthropoda
- Class: Insecta
- Order: Diptera
- Family: Tachinidae
- Subfamily: Exoristinae
- Tribe: Blondeliini
- Genus: Eucelatoria; Townsend, 1909

Type species
- Tachina (Masicera) armigera Coquillett, 1889

Synonyms
- Celatoriopsis Blanchard, 1963; Corozalia Curran, 1934; Dexodimyia Thompson, 1968; Dexodiopsis Thompson, 1968; Eucelatorioidea Thompson, 1968; Eucelatoriopsis Townsend, 1927; Euptilodegeeria Townsend, 1931; Heliodexodes Thompson, 1968; Heliolydella Townsend, 1927; Hemilydella Townsend, 1927; Hypomyothyria Townsend, 1927; Lixinia Curran, 1926; Lydellohoughia Townsend, 1927; Machairomasicera Townsend, 1919; Orophorocera Townsend, 1927; Pseudocelatoria Thompson, 1968; Spathimyia Townsend, 1912; Tinalydella Townsend, 1927; Urodexodes Townsend, 1919; Xiphomyia Townsend, 1917

Genus of flies

Eucelatoria is a genus of flies in the family Tachinidae.

== Species ==
- Eucelatoria argentea (Thompson, 1968)
- Eucelatoria armigera (Coquillett, 1889)
- Eucelatoria aurata (Townsend, 1927)
- Eucelatoria aurea (Thompson, 1968)
- Eucelatoria aurescens Townsend, 1917
- Eucelatoria auriceps (Aldrich, 1926)
- Eucelatoria australis Townsend, 1911
- Eucelatoria bigeminata (Curran, 1927)
- Eucelatoria borealis Burington, 2022
- Eucelatoria bryani Sabrosky, 1981
- Eucelatoria carinata (Townsend, 1919)
- Eucelatoria charapensis (Townsend, 1919)
- Eucelatoria cinefacta (Reinhard, 1967)
- Eucelatoria cingulatus (Schiner, 1868)
- Eucelatoria claripalpis (Thompson, 1968)
- Eucelatoria comosa (Wulp, 1890)
- Eucelatoria cora (Bigot, 1889)
- Eucelatoria crambivora Burington, 2022
- Eucelatoria currani Nihei & Dios, 2016
- Eucelatoria digitata Sabrosky, 1981
- Eucelatoria dimmocki (Aldrich, 1932)
- Eucelatoria discalis (Thompson, 1968)
- Eucelatoria dissepta (Wulp, 1890)
- Eucelatoria dominica Sabrosky, 1981
- Eucelatoria elongata (Wulp, 1890)
- Eucelatoria eucelatorioides (Blanchard, 1963)
- Eucelatoria falcata Burington, 2022
- Eucelatoria ferox (Townsend, 1912)
- Eucelatoria flava Inclán & Stireman, 2014
- Eucelatoria fordlandia Burington, 2022
- Eucelatoria ghanii (Mesnil, 1975)
- Eucelatoria gladiatrix (Townsend, 1917)
- Eucelatoria guimaraesi Sabrosky, 1981
- Eucelatoria gustavogutierrezi Burington, 2022
- Eucelatoria hafelei Burington, 2022
- Eucelatoria heliothis Sabrosky, 1981
- Eucelatoria huitepecensis Burington, 2022
- Eucelatoria hypodermica (Townsend, 1927)
- Eucelatoria inclani Burington, 2022
- Eucelatoria jamaicensis (Curran, 1926)
- Eucelatoria jorgecortesi Burington, 2022
- Eucelatoria kopis Burington, 2022
- Eucelatoria leucophaeata (Reinhard, 1967)
- Eucelatoria longula (Curran, 1934)
- Eucelatoria luctuosa (Wulp, 1890)
- Eucelatoria lugens (Wulp, 1890)
- Eucelatoria makhaira Burington, 2022
- Eucelatoria meridionalis (Townsend, 1912)
- Eucelatoria montana Townsend, 1929
- Eucelatoria nana (Townsend, 1927)
- Eucelatoria nigripalpis (Bigot, 1889)
- Eucelatoria nudioculatus O'Hara & Wood, 2021
- Eucelatoria oblonga O'Hara & Wood, 2021
- Eucelatoria obscurata (Wulp, 1890)
- Eucelatoria obumbrata (Wulp, 1890)
- Eucelatoria occulta (Wulp, 1890)
- Eucelatoria ocellaris (Townsend, 1927)
- Eucelatoria ordinaria (Wulp, 1890)
- Eucelatoria paracarinata Nihei & Dios, 2016
- Eucelatoria parkeri (Sabrosky, 1952)
- Eucelatoria physonotae (Thompson, 1968)
- Eucelatoria pollens (Wulp, 1890)
- Eucelatoria procincta (Reinhard, 1935)
- Eucelatoria ritavargasae Burington, 2022
- Eucelatoria rivalis (Reinhard, 1953)
- Eucelatoria robusta (Thompson, 1968)
- Eucelatoria rubentis (Coquillett, 1895)
- Eucelatoria sabroskyi Burington, 2022
- Eucelatoria sica Burington, 2022
- Eucelatoria striolata (Wulp, 1890)
- Eucelatoria teffeensis (Townsend, 1927)
- Eucelatoria tenebrionis Burington, 2022
- Eucelatoria tenella (Reinhard, 1937)
- Eucelatoria teutonia Sabrosky, 1981
- Eucelatoria texana (Reinhard, 1923)
- Eucelatoria tinensis (Townsend, 1927)
- Eucelatoria woodorum Burington, 2022
- Eucelatoria yanayacu Burington, 2022
