= Rwenzori Mountains =

Mountain range of eastern equatorial Africa

Ruwenzori
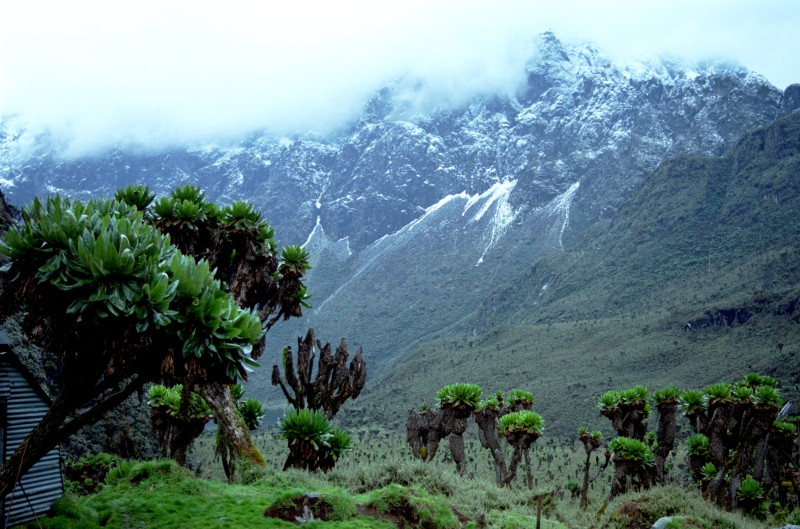

Highest point
- Peak: Mount Stanley
- Elevation: 5,109 m (16,762 ft)
- Coordinates: 00°23′09″N 29°52′18″E

Dimensions
- Length: 120 km (75 mi)

Geography
- Location within Uganda
- Countries: Uganda, Democratic Republic of the Congo

The Rwenzori (also known as the Ruwenzori, Rwenzururu or Rwenjura) are a range of mountains in eastern equatorial Africa, located on the border between Uganda and the Democratic Republic of the Congo. The highest peak of the Ruwenzori reaches 5,109 metres (16,762 ft), and the range's upper regions are permanently snow-capped and glaciated. Rivers fed by mountain streams form one of the sources of the Nile. Because of this, European explorers linked the Ruwenzori with the legendary Mountains of the Moon, claimed by the Greek scholar Ptolemy as the source of the Nile. Virunga National Park in eastern DR Congo and Rwenzori Mountains National Park in southwestern Uganda are located within the range.

== Geology ==
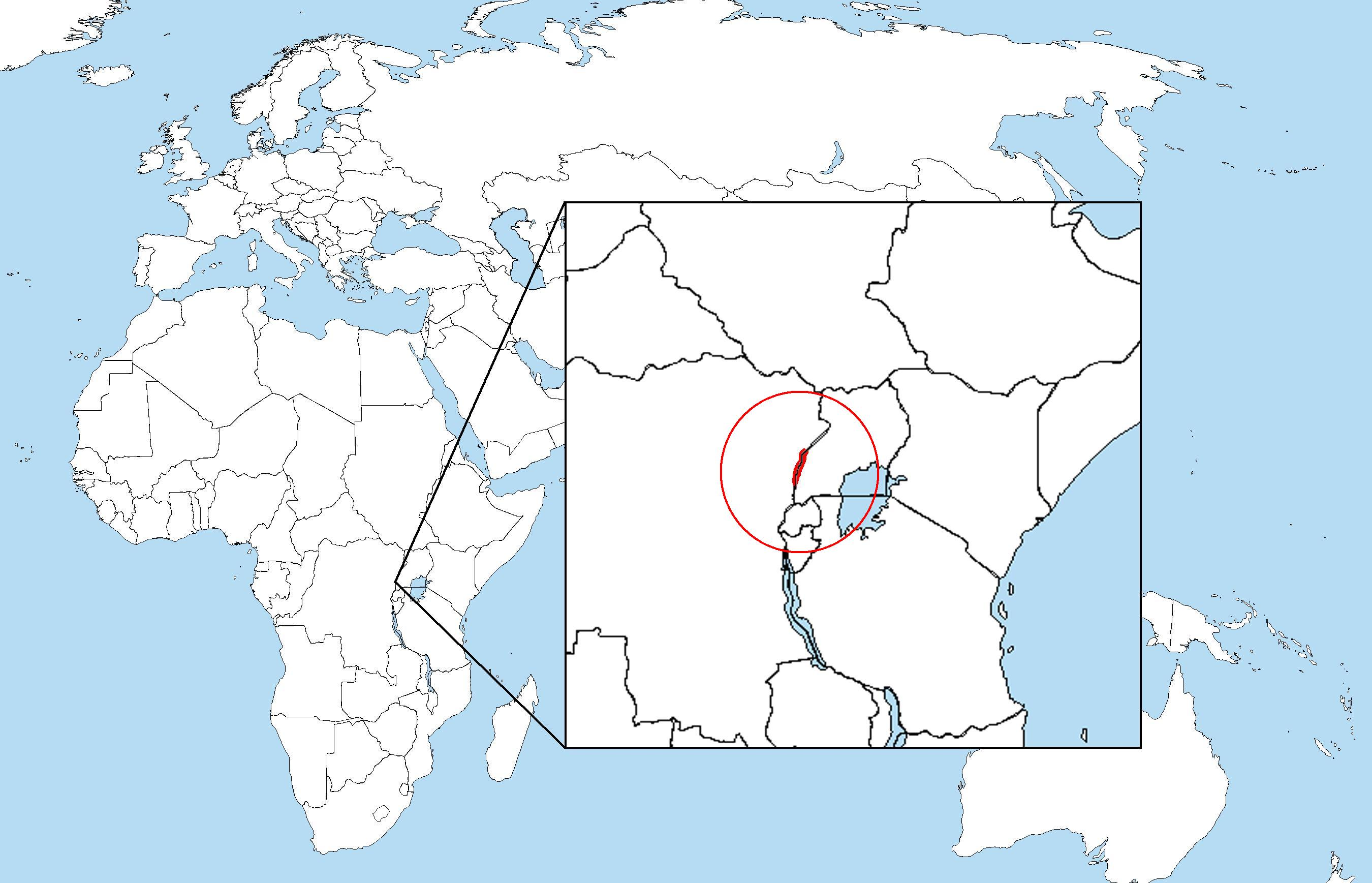
Rwenzori in larger geographical context

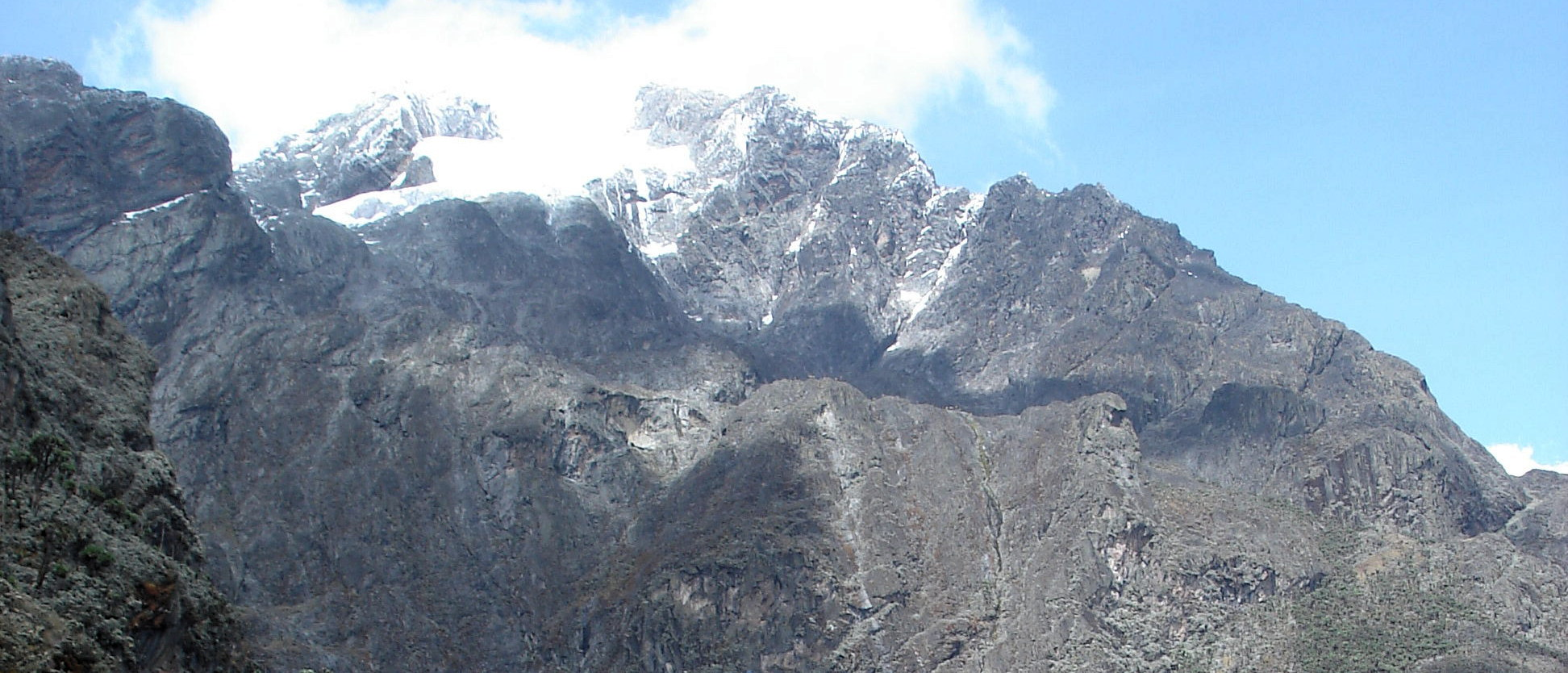
Margherita Peak on Mount Stanley is the highest point in the range.

The mountains formed about three million years ago in the late Pliocene epoch and are the result of an uplifted block of crystalline rocks including gneiss, amphibolite, granite and quartzite.

The Rwenzori mountains are the highest non-volcanic, non-orogenic mountains in the world.

This uplift divided the paleolake Obweruka and created three of the present-day African Great Lakes: Lake Albert, Lake Edward, and Lake George.

The range is about 120 kilometres (75 mi) long and 65 kilometres (40 mi) wide. It consists of six massifs separated by deep gorges: Mount Stanley (5,109 metres (16,762 ft)), Mount Speke (4,890 metres (16,040 ft)), Mount Baker (4,843 metres (15,889 ft)), Mount Emin (4,798 metres (15,741 ft)), Mount Gessi (4,715 metres (15,469 ft)) and Mount Luigi di Savoia (4,627 metres (15,180 ft)). Mount Stanley has several subsidiary summits, with Margherita Peak being the highest point.

== Human history ==
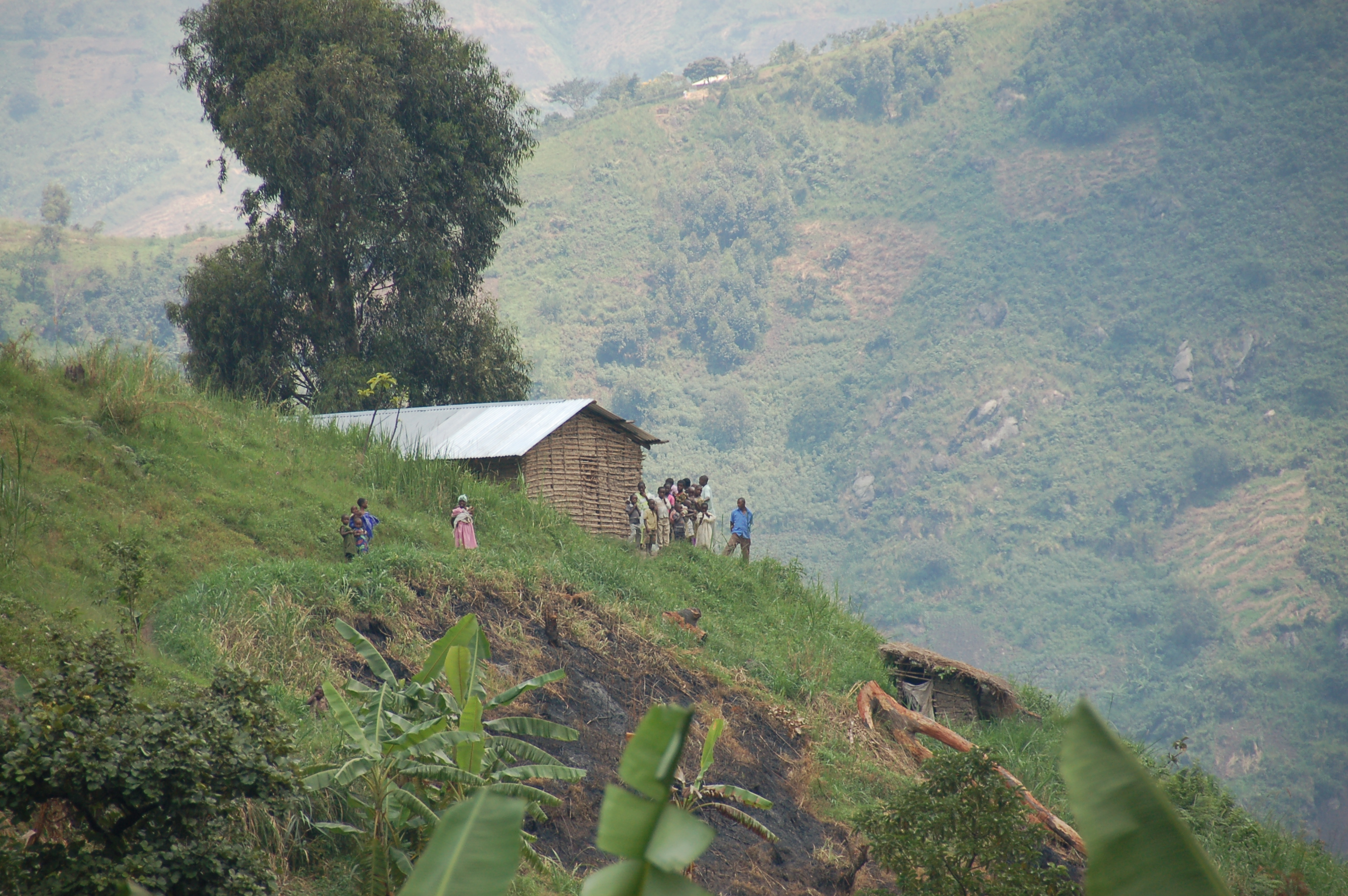
House and people in Kasese District, Uganda

The mountains are occasionally identified with the legendary "Mountains of the Moon", described in antiquity as the source of the Nile River. Modern European explorers observed the range beginning in the late nineteenth century, with Samuel Baker reporting what he called the "Blue Mountains" looming in the distance in 1864, and Henry M. Stanley visiting the range in 1875 and 1888, when he recorded the name as "Ruwenzori".

In 1906, the Duke of Abruzzi mounted an expedition to the Ruwenzori, the account of which was subsequently published by Filippo De Filippi. The expedition scaled the highest peaks of the range, several of which were named by the duke, while Mount Luigi di Savoia was named in his honour. Accompanying the duke was photographer Vittorio Sella, who had previously visited the mountains. His photographs of the glaciers and moraines of the Ruwenzori demonstrated that the glaciers were already in retreat. Sella's photographic work is conserved at the Museo Nazionale della Montagna in Turin and at the Istituto di Fotografia Alpina Vittorio Sella in Biella, both in Italy. The Makerere University, Uganda, also has a selection of his images.

The first traverse of the six massifs of the Ruwenzori was done in 1975, starting on 27 January and ending on 13 February. The traverse was done by Polish climbers Janusz Chalecki, Stanisław Cholewa and Leszek S. Czarnecki, with Mirosław Kuraś accompanying them on the last half of the traverse.

Since Uganda's independence from the British Empire, the Rwenzori Mountains have repeatedly become sanctuaries to rebel groups. The secessionist Rwenzururu movement fought an insurgency in the mountains in the 1960s. In course of the Ugandan Bush War, the Rwenzururu movement reemerged and continued its struggle until signing a peace deal with Ugandan President Milton Obote's government. In the Bush War's later stages, the National Resistance Army (NRA) rebel force operated in the mountains. After the NRA seized power in Uganda in 1986, another civil war broke out. This time, the Rwenzori Mountains hosted the bases of the National Army for the Liberation of Uganda (NALU) and the "Partie de Liberation Congolaise" (PLC), an anti-Mobutu rebel group. In the early 1990s, a Congolese rebel group known as the National Council of Resistance for Democracy (Conseil National de Résistance pour la Démocratie, CNRD) led by André Kisase Ngandu began to wage an insurgency against Mobutu from the Rwenzori Mountains.

Militias aligned with the old Rwenzururu movement's ideology occupied the Rwenzori Mountains from 1997 to June 2001. In 2020, after being defeated across the border by the Armed Forces of the Democratic Republic of the Congo, some elements of the Allied Democratic Forces moved into the Rwenzori Mountains.

== Natural history ==
=== Flora ===
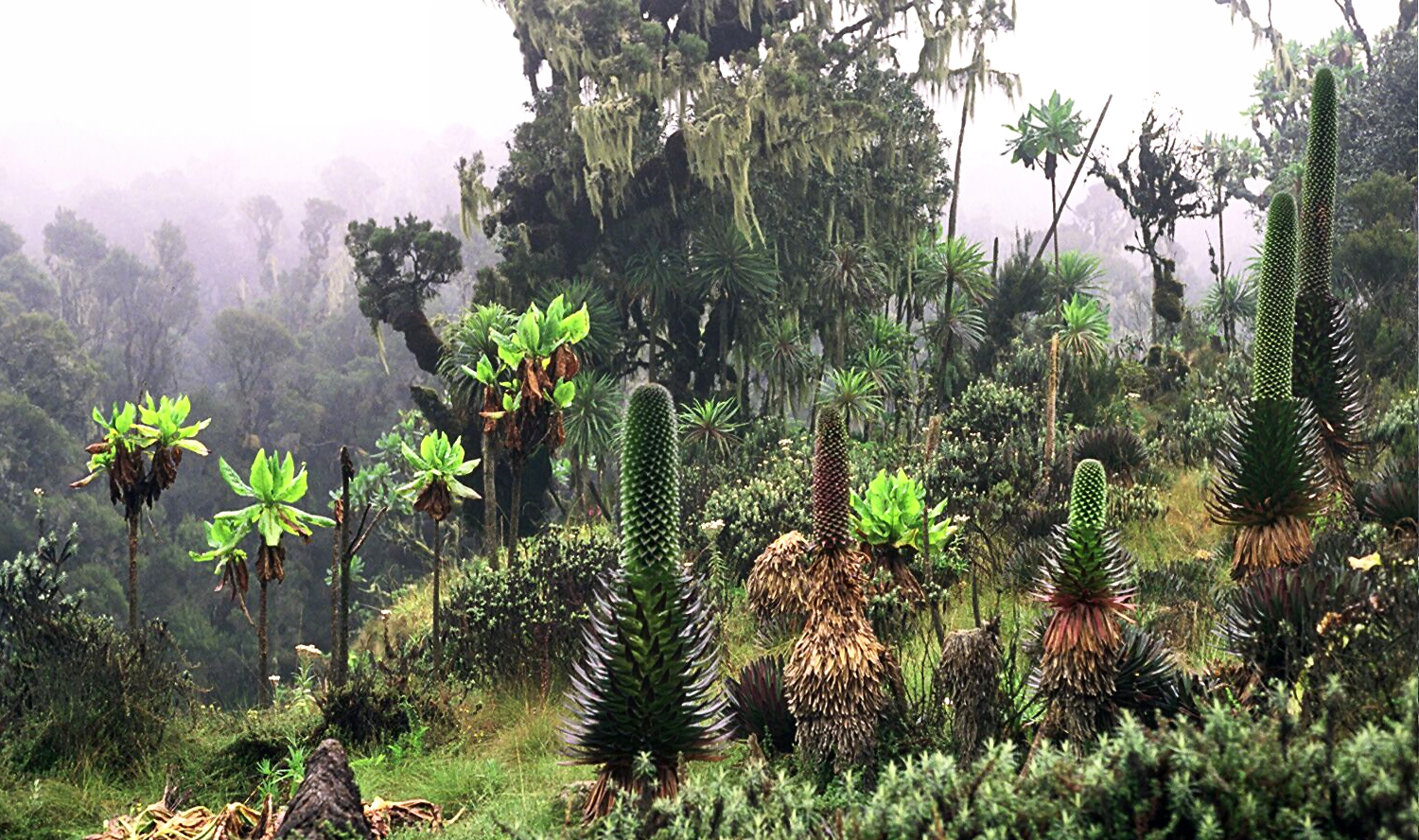
Lower Bigo Bog at 3400 m in the Ruwenzori, with giant lobelia in foreground

The Ruwenzori are known for their vegetation, ranging from tropical rainforest through alpine meadows to snow. The range supports its own species and varieties of giant groundsel and giant lobelia and even has a 6-metre (20 ft) tall heather covered in moss that lives on one of its peaks. Most of the range is now a World Heritage Site and is covered jointly by Rwenzori Mountains National Park in southwestern Uganda and the Virunga National Park in the eastern Congo.

There is no water shortage in the Ruwenzori; yet, several members of the afro-alpine family resemble species that normally thrive in desert climates. The reason lies in their similar water economy. Water is not always readily available to the afroalpine plants when they need it. In addition, nightly frosts affect the sap transport in the plants and the intake of water by its roots. As the day begins, the air temperature and radiation level rise rapidly, putting strenuous demands on the exposed parts of the plants as they try to meet the transpiration demands of the leaves and maintain a proper water balance. To counter the effects of freezing, the afro-alpine plants have developed the insulation systems that give them such a striking appearance. These adaptations become more prominent as the elevation increases.

There are five overlapping vegetation zones in the Ruwenzori: the evergreen forest zone (up to 2,800 metres (9,200 ft)); the bamboo zone (2,800 to 3,300 metres (9,200 to 10,800 ft)); the heather zone (3,000 to 3,800 metres (9,800 to 12,500 ft)); the alpine zone (3,500 to 4,500 metres (11,500 to 14,800 ft)); and, the nival zone (4,400 to 5,000 metres (14,400 to 16,400 ft)). At higher elevations, some plants reach an unusually large size, such as lobelia and groundsels. The vegetation in the Ruwenzori is unique to equatorial alpine Africa.

Flora vs elevation
Meters Order	1500	2000	2500	3000	3200	3400	3600	3800	4000	4200	4400	4600	4800	5000	5100
Lamiales			Mimulopsis elliotii Mimulopsis arborescens												
Rosales	Prunus africana			Hagenia abyssinica											
Rosales								Alchemilla subnivalis Alchemilla stuhlmanii Alchemilla triphylla Alchemilla johnstonii							
Rosales				Alchemilla argyrophylla											
Fabales	Albizia gummifera														
Cornales	Alangium chinense														
Malpighiales	Casearia battiscombei Croton macrostachyus Neoboutonia macrocalyx Symphonia globulifera			Hypericum sp											
Malpighiales				Hypericum revolutum Hypericum bequaertii											
Asparagales		Scadoxus cyrtanthiflorus													
Asparagales				Disa stairsii											
Asterales						Dendrosenecio erici-rosenii									
Asterales				Dendrosenecio adnivalis Helichrysum sp. Lobelia bequaertii Lobelia wollastonii						Helichchrysum guilelmii					
Asterales										Helichchrysum stuhlmanii					
Asterales								Senecio transmarinus Senecio mattirolii							
Apiales								Peucedanum kerstenii							
Myrtales	Syzygium guineense														
Sapindales	Allophylus abyssinicus														
Gentianales	Tabernaemontana sp.							Galium ruwenzoriense							
Ericales	Aningeria adolfi-friederici			Erica arborea Erica trimera											
Ericales				Erica silvatica Erica johnstonii											
Brassicales								Subularia monticola							
Primulales				Rapanea rhododendroides											
Ranunculales								Ranunculus oreophytus Arabis alpina							
Santalales	Strombosia scheffleri														
Poales			Yushania alpina					Carex runssoroensis Festuca abyssinica							
Poales											Poa ruwenzoriensis				
Lecanorales					Usnea										
Order Meters	1500	2000	2500	3000	3200	3400	3600	3800	4000	4200	4400	4600	4800	5000	5100

== Glacial recession ==
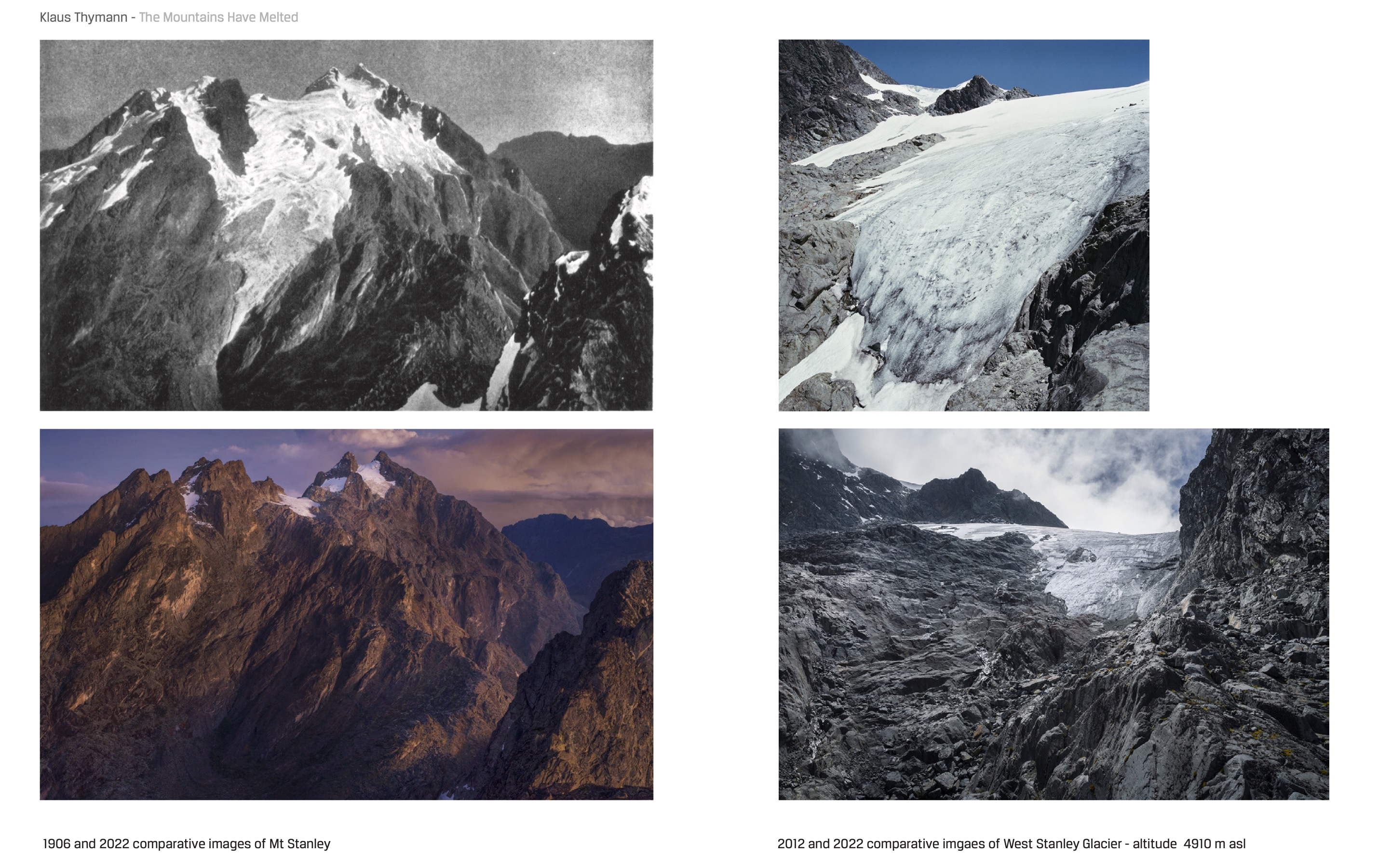
1906 (top left, archive) and 2022 (bottom left) comparative images of Mt Stanley 2012 (top right) and 2022 (bottom right) comparative images of West Stanley Glacier - altitude 4910 m asl created by Klaus Thymann on Project Pressure Expeditions

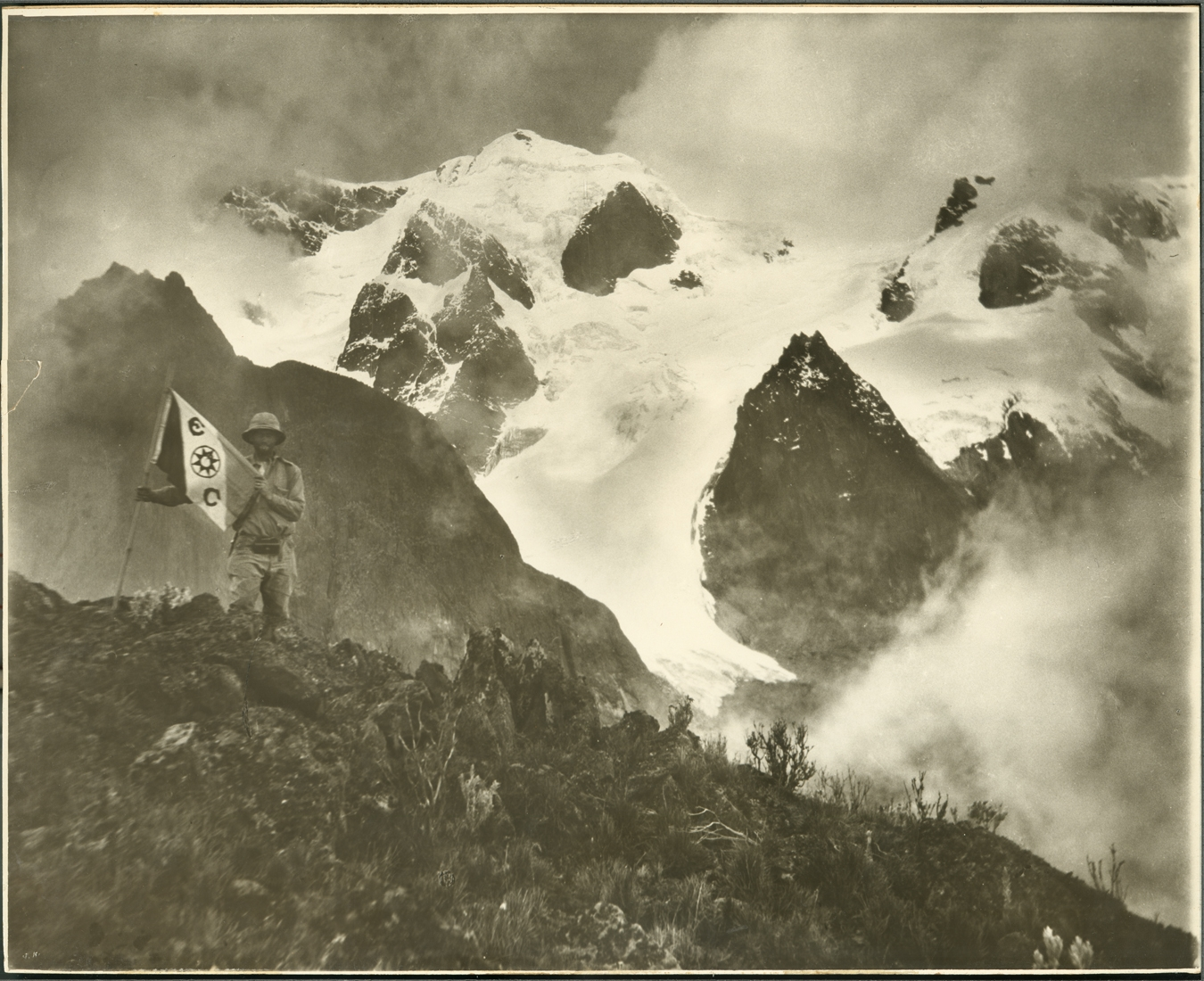
Ornithologist James P. Chapin on a Ruwenzori expedition under flag of The Explorers Club, 1925

An ongoing concern is the impact of climate change on the Ruwenzori's glaciers. In 1906, forty-three named glaciers were distributed over six mountains with a total area of 7.5 square kilometres (2.9 mi^{2}), about half the total glacier area in Africa. By 2005, less than half of these were still present, on only three mountains, with an area of about 1.5 square kilometres (0.58 mi^{2}). Recent scientific studies, such as those by Richard Taylor of University College London, have attributed this retreat to global climate change and have investigated the impact of this change on the mountain's vegetation and biodiversity.

In 2012, 2020, 2022, 2024 and 2025; Klaus Thymann led expeditions with the environmental charity Project Pressure creating comparative photographs to visually document the glacier recession, the findings were published in global media including BBC One Planet, The Guardian and Yale Environment 360. The alteration can be seen in comparative images. As the temperature rises and the glaciers recede, vegetation slowly creeps up the mountain.

In 2025, Project Pressure created the world's first 3D model of the Ugandan glaciers on Mount Stanley using drone photography and GPS coordinates. They found that the surface area of the Stanley Plateau glacier fell by 29.5% between 2020 and 2024. During the drone survey, the exhibition also discovered an accessible ice cave.

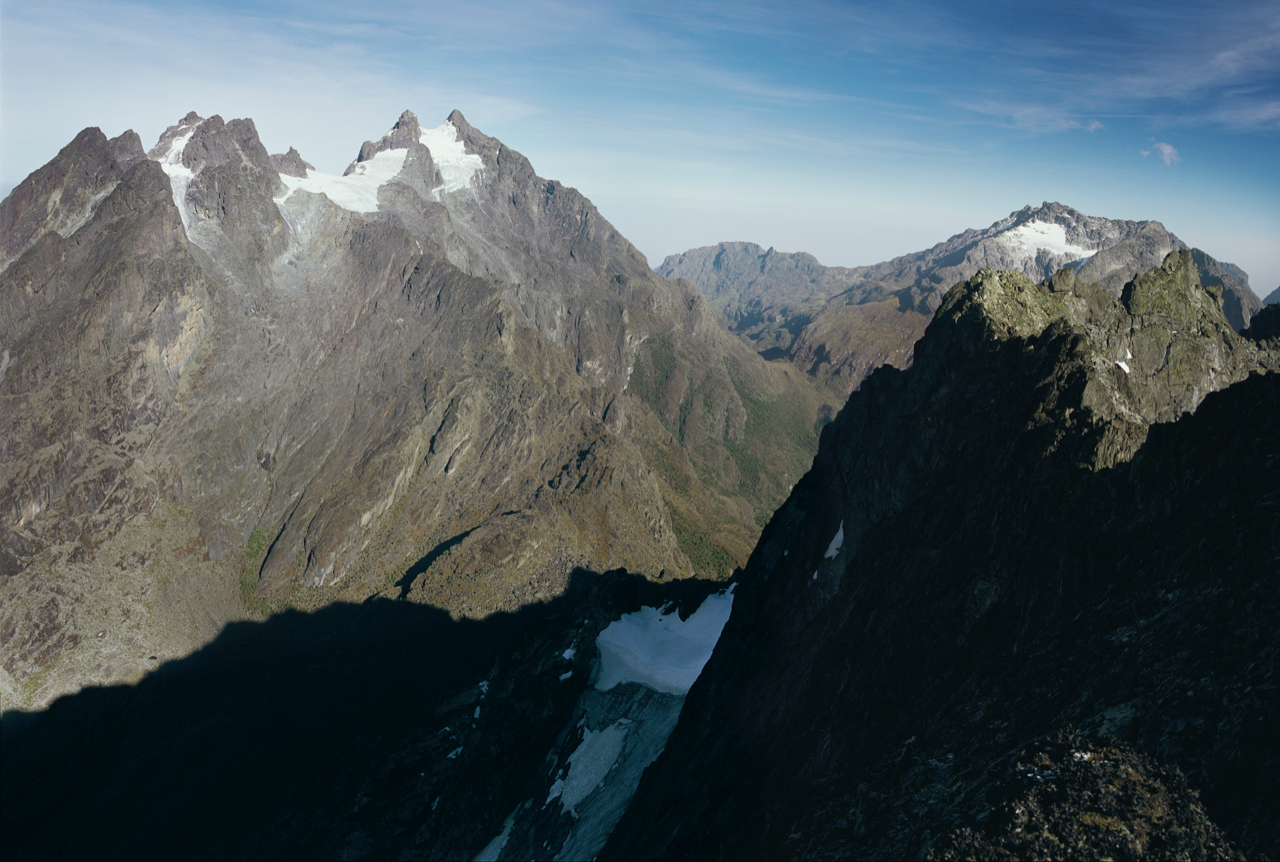
Comparative Image 2012. Mount Stanley (right) and Speke (left)

== See also ==
- 1966 Toro earthquake
- Rwenzori Mountains National Park
- Virunga National Park

== Notes ==
=== References ===
- Day, Christopher R. (July 2011). "The Fates of Rebels: Insurgencies in Uganda". Comparative Politics. 43 (4): 439–458. doi:10.5129/001041511796301623. JSTOR 23040638.
- Glaciers of the Middle East and Africa, Williams, Richard S. Jr. (editor) In: U. S. Geological Survey Professional Paper, 1991, pp.G1-G70
- Guide to the Ruwenzori, Osmaston, H.A., Pasteur, D. 1972, Mountain Club of Uganda. 200 p.
- Recession of Equatorial Glaciers. A Photo Documentation, Hastenrath, S., 2008, Sundog Publishing, Madison, WI, ISBN 978-0-9729033-3-2, 144 pp.
- Tropical Glaciers, Kaser, G., Osmaston, H.A. 2002, Cambridge University Press, UK. 207 p.
- Ruwenzori, De Filippi, F. 1909. Constable, London. 408 p.
- Greenpeace article "The Death of the Ice Giants"
- BBC Article "Fabled ice field set to vanish"
- Dr Taylor's Homepage, with information about the impact of climate change on Ruwenzori.
- Kaser et al. 2006, in International Book of Climatology 24: 329–339 (2004)
- Prunier, Gérard (2009). Africa's World War : Congo, the Rwandan Genocide, and the Making of a Continental Catastrophe: Congo, the Rwandan Genocide, and the Making of a Continental Catastrophe. Oxford: Oxford University Press. ISBN 978-0-19-970583-2.
- Stearns, Jason (2012). Dancing in the Glory of Monsters: The Collapse of the Congo and the Great War of Africa. New York City: PublicAffairs. ISBN 978-1610391597.
