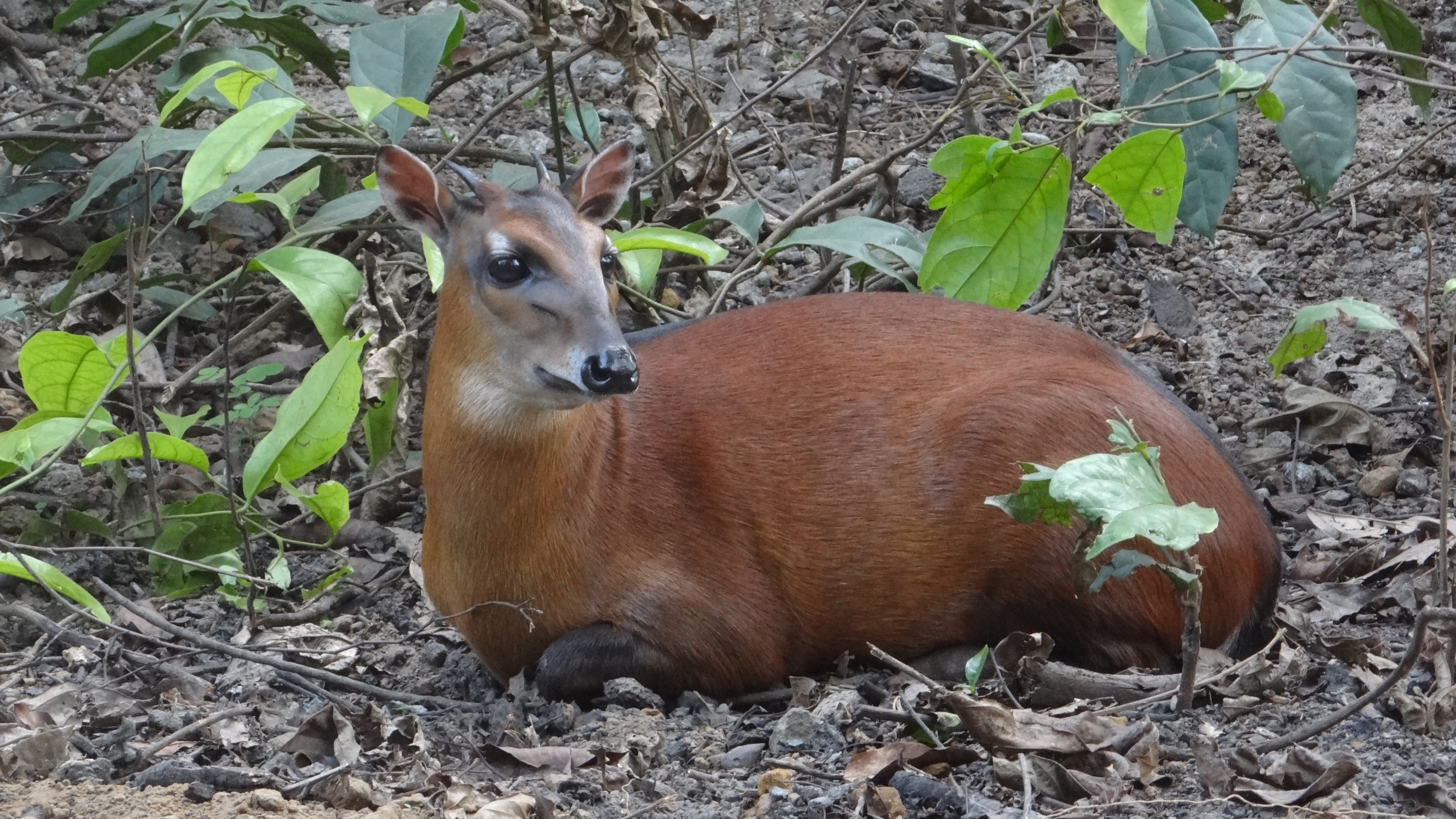
- Individual in Gabon

Conservation status
- Near Threatened (IUCN 3.1)
- CITES Appendix II

Scientific classification
- Kingdom: Animalia
- Phylum: Chordata
- Class: Mammalia
- Order: Artiodactyla
- Family: Bovidae
- Genus: Cephalophus
- Species: C. dorsalis

Binomial name
- Cephalophus dorsalis J.E. Gray, 1846

Subspecies
- C. d. dorsalis (Gray, 1846); C. d. castaneus (Thomas, 1892)

= Bay duiker =

Species of mammal

The bay duiker (Cephalophus dorsalis), also known as the black-striped duiker and the black-backed duiker, is a forest-dwelling duiker native to western and southern Africa. It was first described by British zoologist John Edward Gray in 1846. Two subspecies are identified. The bay duiker is reddish-brown and has a moderate size. Both sexes reach 44–49 cm (17–19 in) at the shoulder. The sexes do not vary considerably in their weights, either; the typical weight range for this duiker is 18–23 kg (40–51 lb). Both sexes have a pair of spiky horns, measuring 5–8 cm (2.0–3.1 in). A notable feature of this duiker is the well-pronounced solid stripe of black extending from the back of the head to the tail.

The bay duiker is a nocturnal animal. It tends to remain solitary, but pairs can also be observed. The leopard is the main predator of this duiker. It mainly prefers fruits, but may also feed on animal matter such as bird eggs. Females may conceive by the age of 18 months. Breeding occurs throughout the year. Gestation lasts about 240 days, following which generally a single offspring is born. The lifespan of the bay duiker is typically 17 to 18 years.

The bay duiker prefers old-growth or primary forests. It has been historically overhunted across its range for bushmeat. The survival of the bay duiker is also threatened by human settlement and agricultural expansion due to this duiker's preference for old-growth forests, and habitat degradation. The bay duiker is, however, still a common duiker species, and is classified as near threatened by the International Union for Conservation of Nature and Natural Resources.

== Taxonomy and etymology ==
- - - - Common duiker
      - - - Abbott's duiker
          - Yellow-backed duiker
        - - Jentink's duiker
          - Bay duiker
    - Zebra duiker

Phylogenetic relationships of the bay duiker (Johnston et.al. 2012)

The bay duiker was first described by British zoologist John Edward Gray in 1846. The generic name probably comes from the combination of the New Latin word cephal, meaning head, and the Greek word lophos, meaning crest. The specific name dorsalis is a Latin word referring to the back surface of an object. The common name "duiker" comes from the Afrikaans word duik, or Dutch dūken (both mean "diver") owing to the tendency of this antelope to seek cover in bushes. The bay duiker is also known as the black-striped duiker and the black-backed duiker.

A 2001 phylogenetic study divided Cephalophus into three distinct lineages: the giant duikers, east African red duikers and west African red duikers. The bay duiker was classified as a giant duiker along with the yellow-backed duiker (C. silvicultor), Abbott's duiker (C. spadix), and Jentink's duiker (C. jentinki). In 2012, Anne R. Johnston (of the University of Orleans) and colleagues constructed a cladogram of the subfamily Cephalophinae (duiker) based on mitochondrial analysis. They showed that within the "giant duiker" group, the bay duiker formed a clade with Jentink's duiker, and the zebra duiker is sister to this clade. Similarly, Abbott's duiker and the yellow-backed duiker form a clade sister to Sylvicapra. The bay duiker and Jentink's duiker probably evolved during the Pleistocene, less than 2.5 million years ago.

Although the species may be monotypic, a 2003 paper identified two subspecies of the bay duiker:

- C. d. dorsalis (Gray, 1846): western bay duiker, found in western Africa
- C. d. castaneus {Thomas, 1892): eastern bay duiker, found in central Africa

== Description ==
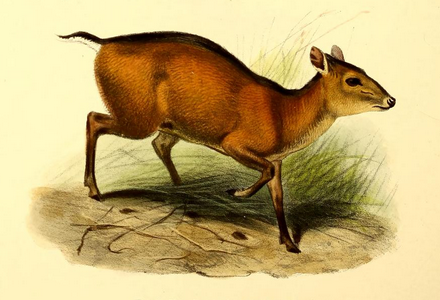
An illustration of the bay duiker from The Book of Antelopes (1894) by Philip Sclater

The bay duiker is a moderately sized antelope; the typical head-and-body length is 76–103 centimetres (30–41 in). Both sexes reach 44–49 centimetres (17–19 in) at the shoulder. The sexes do not vary considerably in their weights either; the typical weight range for this duiker is 18–23 kilograms (40–51 lb). Hence, sexual dimorphism in this species is not as remarkable as in other bovids, though females are often larger than males. The tail, black on the outside but white in the inner parts, is 9–11 centimetres (3.5–4.3 in) long. The tail of the eastern bay duiker terminates in a white tuft. Both sexes possess a pair of spiky horns, measuring 5–8 centimetres (2.0–3.1 in). Rowland Ward, however, recorded a maximum horn length of 12.3 centimetres (4.8 in) from Yokadouma (Cameroon). The horns of females are generally narrower.

Both sexes have a bright reddish-brown coat. The ventral parts and the flanks are all reddish-brown, and the legs dark brown. A notable feature of this duiker is the well-pronounced solid stripe of black extending from the back of the head to the tail. This stripe is narrower in females. Due to its nocturnal nature, the bay duiker has large conspicuous eyes. Whiskers can be observed above the eyes and around the nostrils. The patches of white fur around the whiskers are in sharp contrast to the dark reddish face. Juveniles have a dark coat, that develops the stripes and chestnut to reddish-brown color gradually. The face is marked by a dark region from the nose to the forehead, separated from the rest of the face by two light brown furrows extending above or circling its eyes. Above the eyes and on the lips and chin white spots can be seen. The head has a diminutive crest (a tuft of hair), and is dark brown. The eastern bay duiker is larger and heavier than the western bay duiker, with larger ears and darker coloration. The dorsal stripe is wider and lighter in color in the eastern bay duiker.

The bay duiker is similar to several other duikers. The red duiker can not be readily distinguished from the bay duiker. Though Ogilby's duiker resembles the bay duiker in size and pelage color, the ventral side is paler and the dorsal stripe starts from the shoulders instead of the back of the head. Additionally, the body posture and horn characteristics of the two species differ to a large extent. The bay duiker, as well as the Ogilby's duiker, are remarkably similar to the black duiker, except for the pelage coloration. The dorsal stripe of Peters's duiker also begins at the shoulders but widens to cover the whole of the rump, as does the fainter stripe on the white-bellied duiker. The bay duiker can be easily told apart from the black-fronted duiker and Weyns's duiker, that lack stripes.

== Ecology and behavior ==
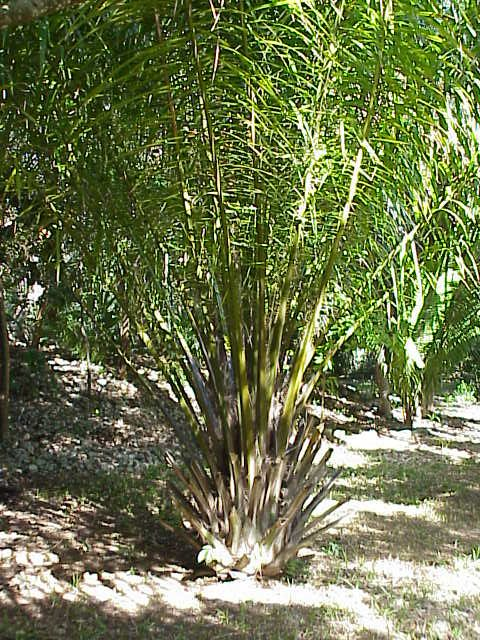
The African oil palm, one of the trees whose fruits the bay duiker feeds on

The bay duiker is a nocturnal animal, and consequently little is known of its behavioral patterns. During the day, the bay duiker rests against trees or in thickets. It tends to remain solitary, but pairs can also be observed. The bay duiker exhibits remarkable alertness. It depends heavily on its sense of smell for foraging and detecting potential danger. Individuals communicate through preorbital gland secretions and excrement. The leopard is the main predator of this duiker. Eagles, bonobos and mandrills may also prey on the bay duiker. An alarmed individual becomes motionless, and might leap to flee.

=== Diet ===
The bay duiker mainly prefers fruits. It feeds on the large fruits of Irvingia species (wild mango), Detarium macrocarpum and the spherical fruits of Mammea africana. Other fruits the duiker may eat are those of Ricinodendron heudelotii and oil-palms, the orange ones of Chrysophyllum beguei, the olive-like ones of Pseudospondias longifolia, the green plums of Panda oleosa and those of Cola rostrata, that resemble cocoa pods. The bay duiker extracts the pulp from the seeds, making a grating sound. If the seeds are large, the duiker spits them out. Smaller seeds such as those of Antrocaryon species may be ingested. A 1989 study found that the soft seeds of plants such as Drypetes gossweileri, Staudtia gabonensis, Dacryoides buettneri, Ongokea gore, Santiria trimera, Annonidium mannii and Pentaclethra macrophylla are preferred. There have been reports of the bay duiker preying on birds (without feeding on the legs and wings) and the embryo of unhatched eggs, carrion, remains of African porcupines and kusimanses, termites, beetles and ants. Dog food may serve as supplement for captive individuals.

=== Reproduction ===
Females may conceive by the age of eighteen months. Breeding occurs throughout the year, and no clear peaks are known. A study in Gabon recorded birth peaks before or during maximum abundance of fruits. In central Africa, births peak in January and February. Oestrus lasts for just eighteen hours. The rutting male pursues a female in oestrus continuously. The male might be humming and may move its foreleg outward. If receptive, the female will allow the male to mount by shifting her tail to a side.

Gestation lasts for about 240 days, following which generally a single offspring is born. The infant weighs nearly 1,600–1,690 grams (56–60 oz), and its coat is dark reddish-brown. The brighter reddish-brown to chestnut color develops by five to six months. For the first few weeks after its birth, the infant is kept concealed in dense vegetation when the mother is away. The offspring can start taking solid food within a few weeks. Weaning occurs at around three-and-a-half months. The lifespan of the bay duiker averages 17 to 18 years.

== Habitat and distribution ==
The bay duiker prefers old-growth or primary forests. Home ranges of females are around 0.2–0.4 square kilometres (0.077–0.154 sq mi) large, and those of males are twice the size of those of females. This duiker formerly occurred in the lowland forested areas (warm, moist rainforests) of Guinea. Nowadays, the bay duiker can be found in moist forested islands and riparian forests in the savannas of Guinea and northeastern Sudan. The bay duiker is native to several countries in western and southern Africa: Angola, Cameroon, Central African Republic, The Democratic Republic of the Congo, Côte d'Ivoire, Equatorial Guinea, Gabon, Ghana, Guinea, Guinea-Bissau, Liberia, Nigeria, Sierra Leone and Togo. It is feared to be extinct in Uganda.

== Threats and conservation ==
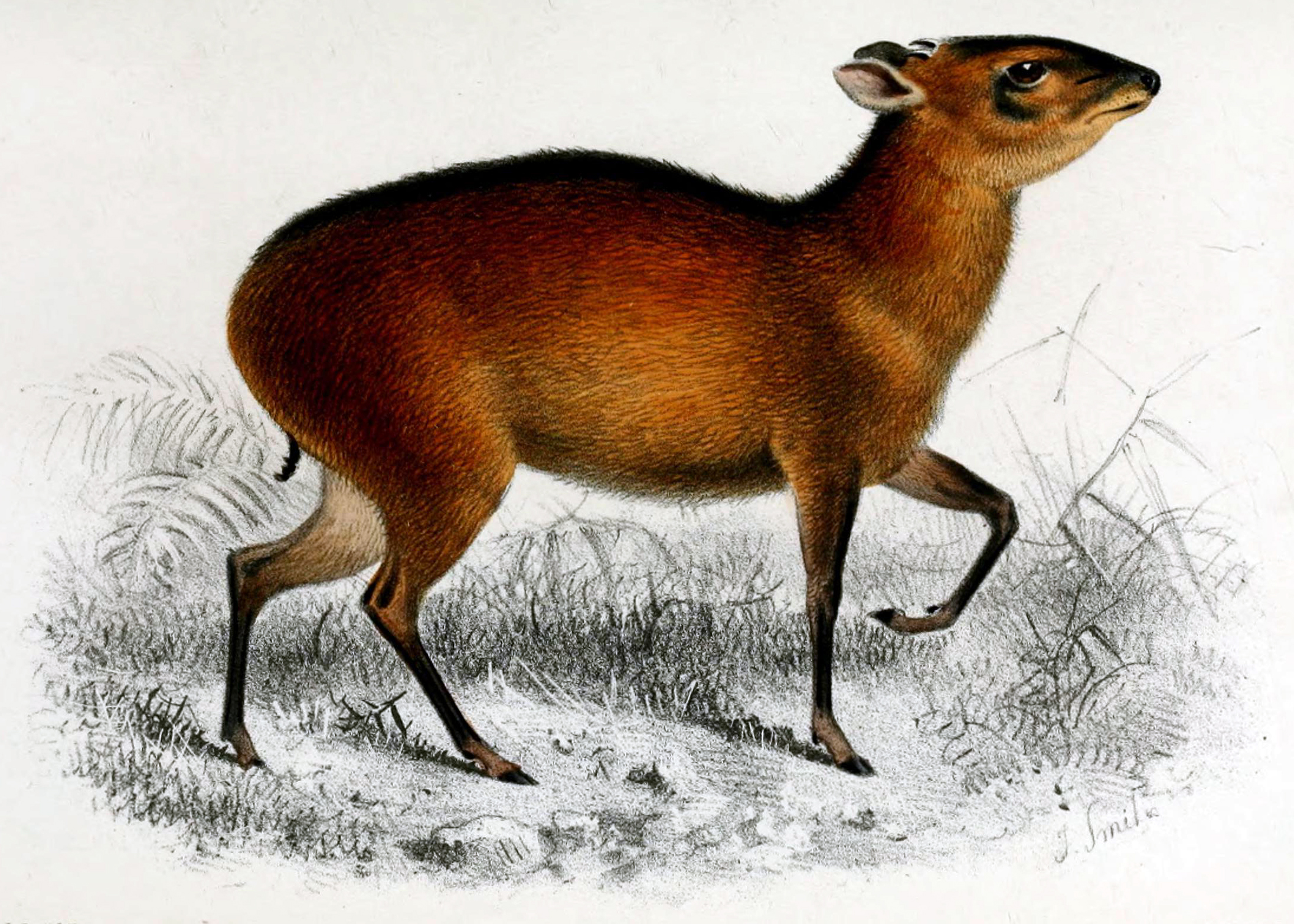
1869 illustration by Joseph Smit

The bay duiker has been historically overhunted across its range for bushmeat. A 2007 study of the extinction of the bay duiker in the Ipassa Makokou Biosphere Reserve (Gabon) held overhunting responsible for the elimination of the species from the reserve. The survival of the bay duiker is also threatened by human settlement and agricultural expansion due to this duiker's preference for old-growth forests, and habitat degradation.

The habitat of the bay duiker has depleted to a large extent due to deforestation. The bay duiker, unlike the other duiker species, is still found in significant numbers, and is classified as Near Threatened by the International Union for Conservation of Nature and Natural Resources (IUCN). The Convention on International Trade in Endangered Species (CITES) enlists the species in Appendix II. In 1999, Rod East of the IUCN SSC Antelope Specialist Group estimated the total population at 725,000. The most significant population occurs only in the Taï National Park (Côte d'Ivoire). Protected areas where bay duikers occur include: Sapo National Park (Liberia); Kakum National Park (Ghana); Campo Ma'an National Park, Dja Faunal Reserve and Lobéké National Park (Cameroon); Dzanga-Sangha Special Reserve and Bangassou (Central African Republic); Monte Alén National Park (Equatorial Guinea); Lopé National Park and Minkébé National Park (Gabon); Odzala National Park and Nouabalé-Ndoki National Park (Congo-Brazzaville); Ituri Rainforest, Kahuzi-Biéga, Maiko and Salonga National Parks (Congo-Kinshasa).
