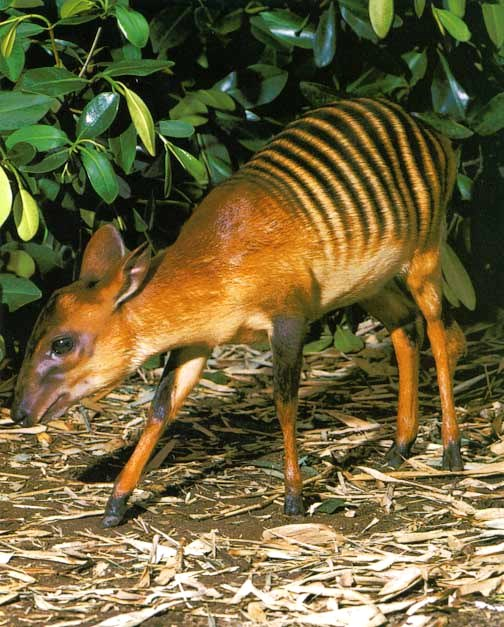

Conservation status
- Vulnerable (IUCN 3.1)
- CITES Appendix II

Scientific classification
- Kingdom: Animalia
- Phylum: Chordata
- Class: Mammalia
- Order: Artiodactyla
- Family: Bovidae
- Subfamily: Antilopinae
- Genus: Cephalophula
- Species: C. zebra

Binomial name
- Cephalophula zebra Gray, 1838
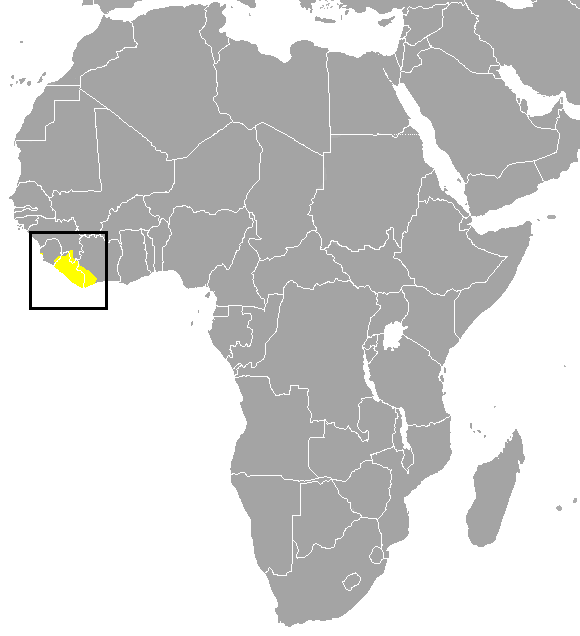
- Distribution of zebra duiker

= Zebra duiker =

Species of mammal

The zebra duiker (Cephalophula zebra) is a small antelope found primarily in Liberia, as well as the Ivory Coast, Sierra Leone, and occasionally Guinea. They are sometimes referred to as the banded duiker or striped-back duiker. It is believed to be one of the earliest duiker species to have evolved. Formerly in the genus Cephalophus, it was reassigned to its own genus, Cephalophula, in 2022.

== Taxonomy and etymology ==
- - - - Common duiker
      - - - Abbott's duiker
          - Yellow-backed duiker
        - - Jentink's duiker
          - Bay duiker
    - Zebra duiker

Phylogenetic relationships of the bay duiker (Johnston et.al. 2012)

The scientific name of the zebra duiker is Cephalophula zebra. It was first described by British zoologist John Edward Gray in 1838 in Annals of Natural History. No subspecies are identified. The generic name probably comes from the combination of the New Latin word cephal, meaning head, and the Greek word lophos, meaning crest. The specific name zebra pertains to the striking resemblance this duiker bears to the zebra due to the presence of dorsal stripes. The word "duiker" comes from the Afrikaans word duik, or Dutch duiker—both mean "diver". The zebra duiker is locally known as the marking deer in Liberia.

A 2001 phylogenetic study divided Cephalophus into three distinct lineages: the giant duikers, east African red duikers and west African red duikers. However, the status of two species, the zebra duiker and the Aders' duiker, remained dubious. In 2012, Anne R. Johnston (of the University of Orleans) and colleagues constructed a cladogram of the subfamily Cephalophinae (duiker) based on mitochondrial analysis. They showed that within the "giant duiker" group, the bay duiker formed a clade with Jentink's duiker, and the zebra duiker is sister to this clade. Similarly, Abbott's duiker and yellow-backed duiker form a clade sister to Sylvicapra. The bay duiker and Jentink's duiker probably evolved during the Pleistocene, less than 2.5 million years ago. In 2022 the species was formally assigned to the genus Cephalophula.

== Description ==
The Zebra duiker has a gold or red-brown coat with 12-16 distinctive zebra-like stripes, dark markings on its upper legs, and a russet face. Newborns appear darker because they are born with their stripes closer together. An adult can grow to 90 cm (35 in) in length, 45 cm (18 in) in height, and 20 kg (44 lb) in weight. Its horns are short and round with sharp pointed tips. It is about 4.5–5.0 cm (1.8–2.0 in) long in males, and half that in females. Female body size is larger than males, possibly due to long gestation periods.

Dental Formula:

0/3 I, 0/1 C, 3/2-3 P 3/3 M = 30-32 total

== Habitat ==
The Zebra duiker lives in lowland primary rainforests, particularly by clearings and along forest margins. It is most commonly found in forested areas of the midwestern parts of Africa. They can less commonly be found in hill and low-mountain forests.

== Diet ==
It is a ruminant which feeds primarily on fruit, foliage, and seeds. Though rare, there is evidence that it may eat rodents on occasion. Its reinforced nasal bone enables it to crack open the hard exterior of certain fruits.

== Reproduction ==
The gestation period is anywhere from 221 to 229 days and the female is receptive to mating about 10 days after parturition. The mother will only birth one calf at a time. A newborn can weigh from 1270 to 1550 g at birth. During the first ten days after birth, referred to as the lactation period, a newborn grows at a rate of about 94 g/day. After that, the growth rate decreases considerably. Females reach sexual maturity at 9–12 months of age and males reach sexual maturity at 12–18 months. Cephalophula zebra is the only duiker species with the diploid number 2n=58.

== Social behavior ==
The Zebra duiker has displayed diurnal activity when living in captive situations, but mostly nocturnal in the wild. It is a solitary animal that forms pair bonds for breeding purposes. Both the male and female participate in the defense of young and home range. Adaptations include stripes and thickened nasal/frontal bones. The stripes may reduce injury to the more vulnerable abdominal area. The stripes may also make it more difficult for some predators to identify by breaking up the outline of their forms. The nasal bones allow for protection against blunt force during altercations.

== Economic importance ==
It is hunted for bush meat. Its hide and other inedible parts can also be utilized by humans.

== Conservation ==
It is considered vulnerable by the IUCN due to deforestation, loss of habitat, and overhunting within its range. Zebra duikers are common prey to African leopards, African golden cats, rock pythons, and the crowned eagle. Additionally, olive baboons and western chimpanzees will hunt small antelope, such as the zebra duiker, with some troops being observed to have a preference for eating meat.

The zebra duiker has been described as the one duiker species that is the least-capable of adapting to environmental changes, thus granting it the fastest chance (and highest potential) to become extinct. The wild population is estimated at 28,000 individuals. This estimation is believed to be high, and continues to decline. Having once been more widespread, it is now more common in protected areas, in particular the Gola National Park in Sierra Leone, Sapo National Park in Liberia, and Taï National Park in Ivory Coast. In a study conducted to identify areas of greatest conservation need, one zebra duiker was identified in an unprotected area of the Ziama Classified Forest of Guinea. This area is under consideration for classification as a national park, currently serving as a home to many other species categorized as rare or threatened.
