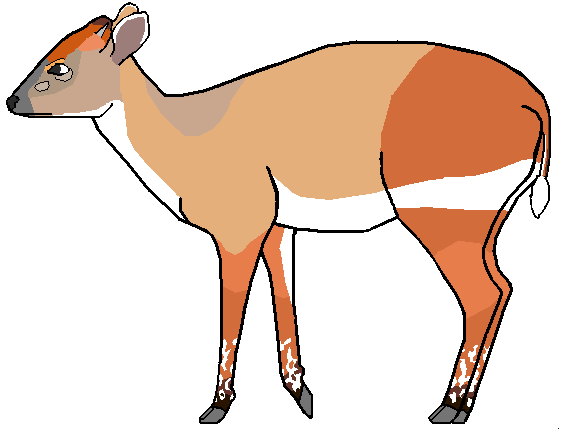

Conservation status
- Vulnerable (IUCN 3.1)

Scientific classification
- Kingdom: Animalia
- Phylum: Chordata
- Class: Mammalia
- Order: Artiodactyla
- Family: Bovidae
- Subfamily: Antilopinae
- Tribe: Cephalophini
- Genus: Leucocephalophus; Bärmann, Fonseca, Langen & Kaleme, 2022
- Species: L. adersi

Binomial name
- Leucocephalophus adersi Thomas, 1918
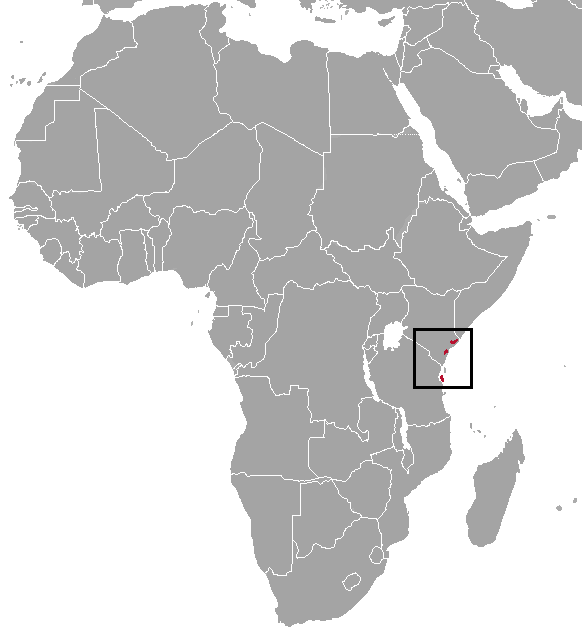
- Distribution of Aders's duiker

Synonyms
- Leucocephalophus adersi (Thomas, 1918)

= Aders's duiker =

Species of mammal

Aders's duiker (Leucocephalophus adersi), also known as nunga in Swahili, kunga marara in Kipokomo and harake in Giriama, is a small, forest-dwelling duiker found only in Zanzibar and Kenya. It was moved to its own genus, Leucocephalophus, in 2022, from Cephalophus. It is named after W. Mansfield Aders, a zoologist with the Zanzibar Government Service.

== Characteristics ==
Aders's duiker stands at around 30 cm (12 in) tall at the shoulder. Its weight varies greatly depending on geographical location; those in eastern Zanzibar weigh 12 kg (26 lb), while those in the south weigh only 7.5 kg (17 lb). Its coat is reddish-brown, grayer on the neck, and lighter down the backside and underneath. A small red crest runs along the head. It also has small, simple horns of 3 to 6 cm (1.2 to 2.4 in). The muzzle is pointed, and the nose has a flat front. The ears measure 7.0–8.3 cm (2.8–3.3 in) long, with a marked cowlick or whorl of hair on the nape of the neck.

== Distribution and habitat ==
Aders's duiker lives primarily in coastal forests and woodlands in Africa. The species can live in quite dry scrub near the sea or among coral outcrops; in Zanzibar, it is restricted to tall thicket forest growing on waterless coral rag. In Arabuko Sokoke (Kenya), they are most often trapped within Cynometra vegetation, especially on "red soil". L. adersi is sympatric with Cephalophus harveyi on the mainland and with C. monticola sundevalli on Zanzibar, although nothing is known regarding their ecological separation.

== Ecology and behavior ==
The species is very shy, alert, and sensitive to sound. As a result, common methods of hunting include the brute-force method of driving the duikers into nets with dogs, or silent ambush at feeding sites.

Aders's duiker lives in coastal forests, thickets and woodlands, where it eats flowers, leaves, and fruit which have fallen from the forest canopy. The species appears to be diurnal, as it is rarely seen active at night. Typical feeding patterns are from dawn to late morning, which is followed by a period of rest and rumination. At midafternoon, Aders's duiker generally becomes active, and will continue foraging until nightfall.

It is generally solitary or found in small groups of two or three. It often picks up scraps dropped by monkeys and birds foraging in the trees.

The species shows a particular dependence on the flowers and berries which grow prolifically from trees common to the area, such as ebony (Diospyros consolatae), kudu berry (Cassine aethiopica) and bush guarri (Euclea racemosa), and bushes such as turkey berry (Canthium spp.) and Polyspheria. In addition to these, it will eat sprouts, buds, and other fresh growth found at ground level. This duiker species can apparently manage without drinking, getting most of the hydration it needs from its diet.

This duiker has extremely specific habitat requirements, being found only in areas of old-growth thicket, with the highest population densities (11.4 ± 5.18/km^{2} (29.5 ± 13.4/sq mi)) recorded in relatively undisturbed high thicket. However, some Aders's duikers range to secondary thicket. In the Arabuko-Sokoke Forest in Kenya, Aders's duikers inhabit regions of Cyanometra forest.

Not much is known of its reproductive habits, although it may breed all year long.

== Conservation ==
They are threatened by habitat destruction, feral dogs, and overhunting. They are particularly sought by humans due to their soft skin and meat. The population in Zanzibar had declined from 5000 in 1983 to 640 in 1999, and it will probably continue to decrease rapidly. They are listed as vulnerable by IUCN. In Kenya, the duiker is present at very low densities, though the decline is probably not as severe as the other population.

Several conservation plans have been made, and a captive-breeding program has been proposed.
