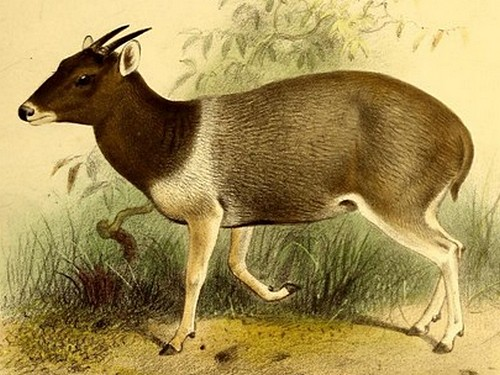

Conservation status
- Endangered (IUCN 3.1)
- CITES Appendix I

Scientific classification
- Kingdom: Animalia
- Phylum: Chordata
- Class: Mammalia
- Infraclass: Placentalia
- Order: Artiodactyla
- Family: Bovidae
- Genus: Cephalophus
- Species: C. jentinki

Binomial name
- Cephalophus jentinki Thomas, 1892
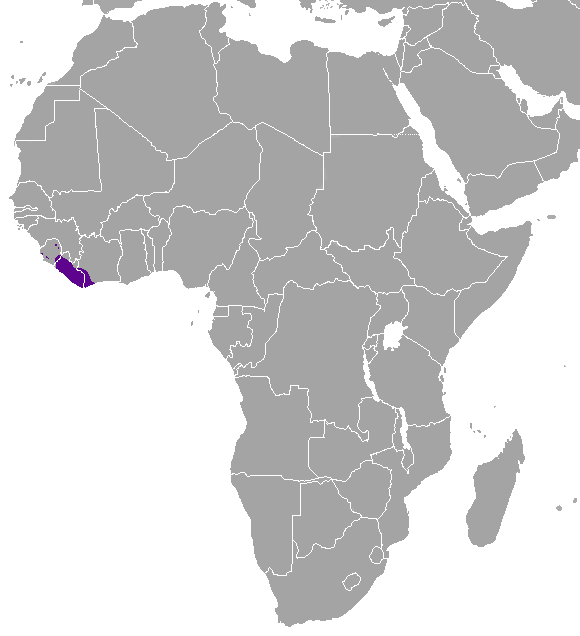
- Distribution of Jentink's duiker

= Jentink's duiker =

Species of mammal

Jentink's duiker (Cephalophus jentinki), also known as gidi-gidi in Krio and kaikulowulei in Mende, is a forest-dwelling duiker found in the southern parts of Liberia, southwestern Côte d'Ivoire, and scattered enclaves in Sierra Leone. It is named in honor of Fredericus Anna Jentink.

Jentink's duikers stand around 80 cm (31 in) tall at the shoulder and weigh about 70 kg (150 lb), making them the largest species of the duikers. They are gray from the shoulders back and dark black from the shoulders forward. A white band goes over the shoulders, between the two colours and joining the white undersides. Jentink's duikers have long, thin horns, which curl back a little at the ends, and reach between 14 and 21 cm (5.5 and 8.3 in).

Jentink's duikers live mainly in very thick rainforest, where they eat fruit, flowers, and leaves which have fallen from the canopy, as well as stems of seedlings, roots, and, to the annoyance of local farmers, palm nuts, mangos, and cocoa pods. They are nocturnal and shelter during the day in dense thickets, or buttress roots, apparently in pairs. Jentink's duikers are reported to be territorial animals, and when frightened, will run very quickly, but wear themselves out easily.

The species was first recognized as a new species in 1884, though it was not described until 1892. The species then vanished until a skull was found in Liberia in 1948. Sightings have occurred in its habitat since the 1960s. In 1971, the species was successfully bred in the Gladys Porter Zoo.

Recent population numbers are not available. In 1999 it was estimated that around 3,500 Jentink's duikers remained in the wild, but the following year others suggested less than 2,000 were likely to remain. They are threatened primarily by habitat destruction and commercial bushmeat hunters.

== Taxonomy ==
- - - - Common duiker
      - - - Abbott's duiker
          - Yellow-backed duiker
        - - Jentink's duiker
          - Bay duiker
    - Zebra duiker

Phylogenetic relationships of Jentink's duiker (Johnston et.al. 2012)

It is classified under the genus Cephalophus and the family Bovidae. It was first described by British zoologist Oldfield Thomas in 1892 in the Proceedings of the Zoological Society of London. The generic name probably comes from the combination of the New Latin word cephal, meaning head, and the Greek word lophos, meaning crest. The word "duiker" comes from the Afrikaans word duik, or Dutch dūken, both mean "diver".

A 2001 phylogenetic study divided Cephalophus into three distinct lineages: the giant duikers, east African red duikers and west African red duikers. Jentink's duiker was classified as a giant duiker along with the yellow-backed duiker (C. silvicultor), Abbott's duiker (C. spadix), and the bay duiker (C. dorsalis). In 2012, Anne R. Johnston (of the University of Orleans) and colleagues constructed a cladogram of the subfamily Cephalophinae (duiker) based on mitochondrial analysis. They showed that within the "giant duiker" group, Jentink's duiker formed a clade with the bay duiker, and the zebra duiker is sister to this clade. Similarly, Abbott's duiker and yellow-backed duiker form a clade sister to Sylvicapra. Jentink's duiker and the bay duiker probably evolved during the Pleistocene, less than 2.5 million years ago.
