= Campo Ma'an National Park =

National park in Cameroon

- IUCN category II (national park)
- Location within Cameroon
- Location: Cameroon
- Coordinates: 2°21′N 9°59′E
- Area: 2,680.00 km^{2} (1,035 sq mi)
- Established: 2000

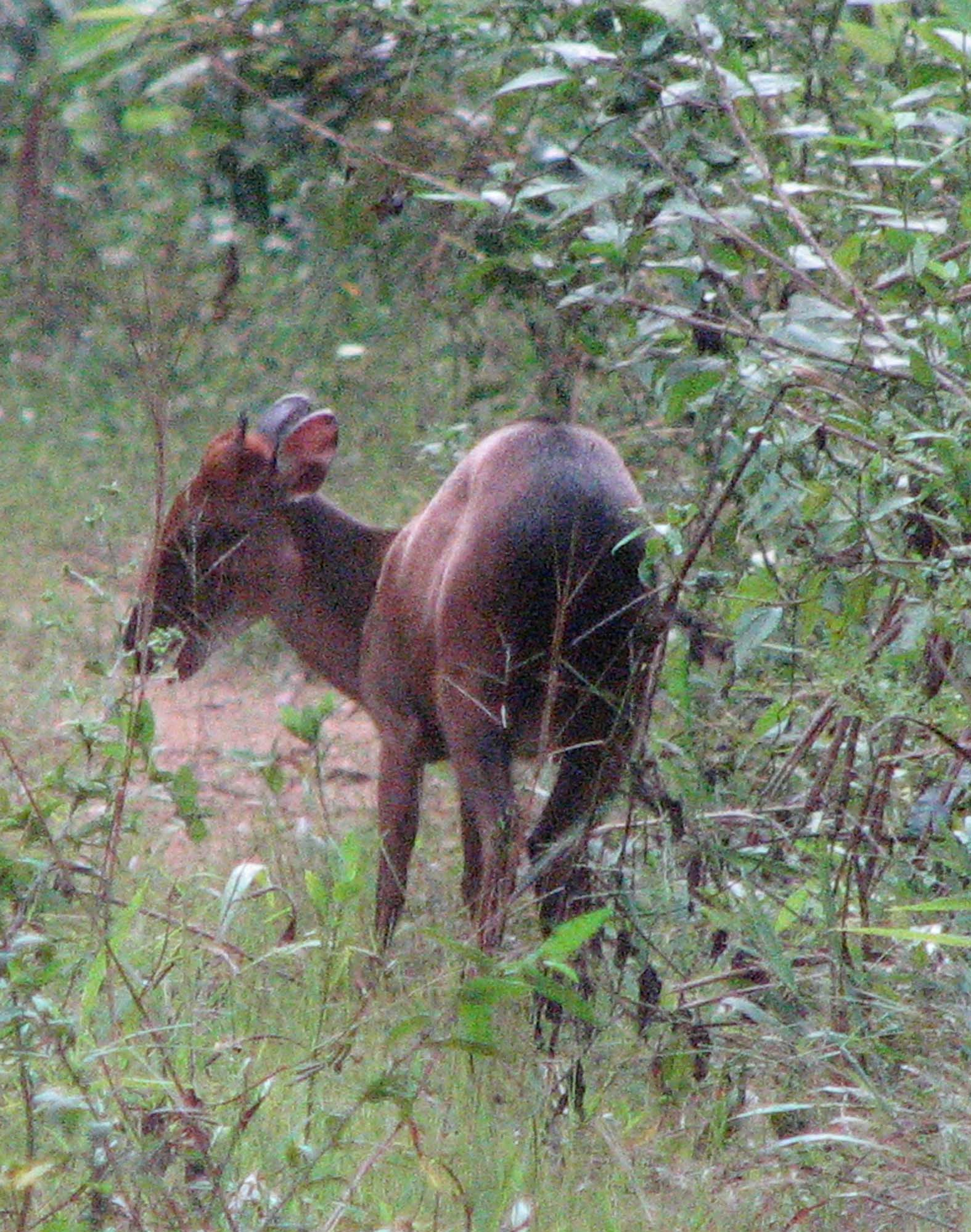
A Peters's Duiker antelope

Campo Ma'an National Park is a 2,680 square kilometer National Park in Cameroon, located in the South Region in the Océan division. It borders with Equatorial Guinea on the south, the Atlantic Ocean to its west, the Vallée-du-Ntem and the Mvila to the east. Total area of the park and buffer zone measure approximately 700,000 hectares. The climate has two dry seasons, November to March and July to August, and two rainy seasons, April to June and August to October. Average temperature is 25 °C.

== History ==
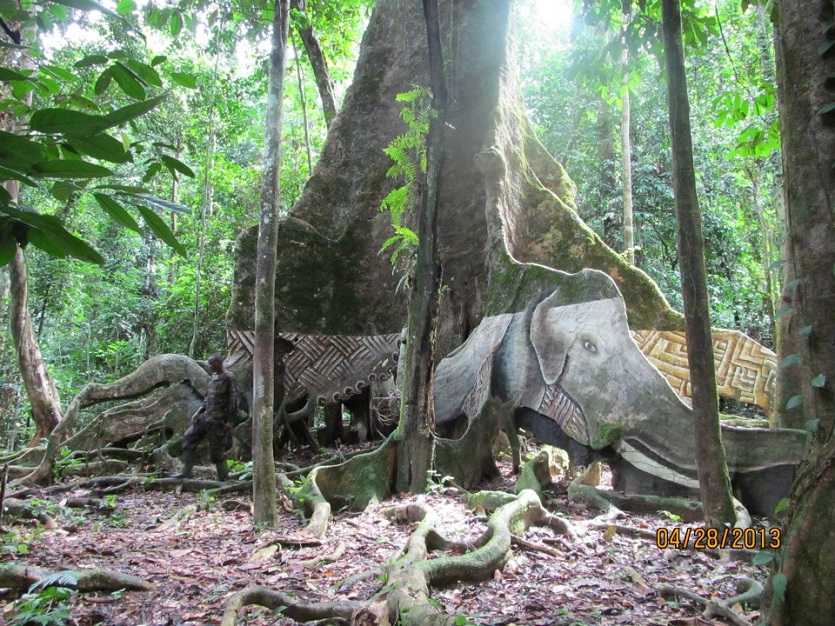
Musée de l'arbre au Parc National de Campo Ma'an

The original Campo Wildlife Reserve (1,582 km^{2}) was established in 1932 as an agreement between the Government of Cameroon and the Campo Forest Company. The adjacent Ma'an forest plantation (990 km^{2}) was set up in 1980 for conservation of Aucoumea klaineana (okoumé), a tree species with high economic logging value.

On August 6, 1999, under Decision 054/CAB/PN, the forest was upgraded to a Technical Operational Unit (TOU) of 771,000 ha. The Campo Ma'an TOU has a land allocation plan comprising protected area and protected forest, forest management units, a maritime estate and an agroforestry area.

In 2000, the protected area and protected forest became the current Campo Ma'an National Park, as a compensation for the environmental damages expected from the Chad-Cameroon oil pipeline. It was recognized as a site of the Global Environmental Facility, World Bank Biodiversity Conservation and Management Project. Currently, the national park is surrounded by five forest management units, industrial rubber plantations (HEVECAM), industrial oil palm plantations (SOCAPALM, CAMVERT) and a buffer zone.

== Biodiversity ==
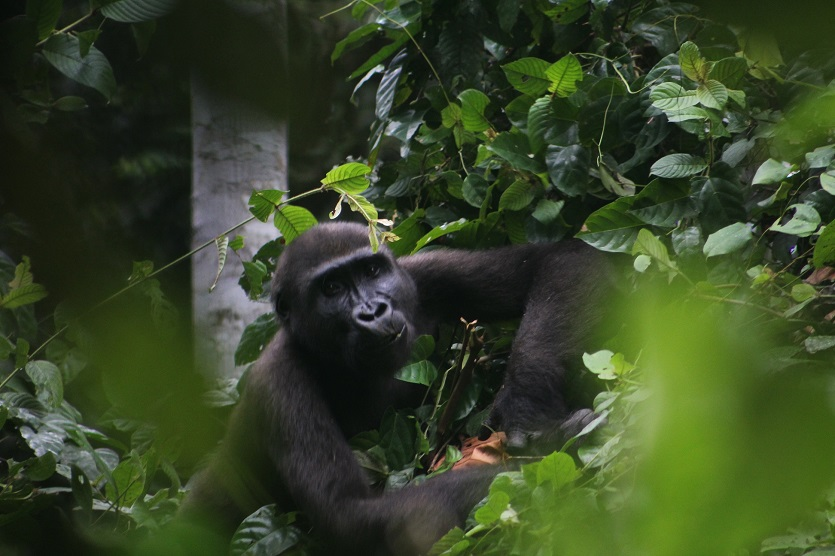
Image of a gorilla from the WWF habituation program at Campo Ma'an National Park.

Campo Ma'an National Park is biodiversity hotspot, with a wide range of plant and animal species, including several taxonomic endemics. Mammal species include forest elephants, duikers, hippos, bush pigs, giant pangolins, black colobus, mandrills and leopards. A small population of forest buffalo reside in the southern area of the park. Campo Ma'an National Park harbours populations of critically endangered western lowland gorilla and endangered central chimpanzee. The area is considered a priority landscape for conservation of western lowland gorillas and central chimpanzees by the IUCN and the park is the site of an ongoing gorilla habituation project. Reptile species reported are 122, and fish species are 165. A survey of millipedes, conducted in 2015, reports 27 species in the Campo Ma'an National Park, the most abundant being Aporodesmus gabonicus. It is also one of the 33 bird identified areas in the southwestern corner of Cameroon, and has more than 300 bird species. The forest type is mainly closed evergreen canopy, and is described as Atlantic Biafran forest with many plant species in the Caesalpiniaceae family. There are 29 species of plants occurring uniquely within park boundaries. A rare and critically endangered orchid from the genus Distylodon was discovered in the nearby village of Bifa; assessments are ongoing to detect further occurrence of this species within the protected area. Total plant species are reported at 256, with 22 listed as endangered by the IUCN. The forest region containing the Campo Ma'an National Park is believed to have persisted as a tropical rainforest throughout the Pleistocene era, based on the distribution of slowly dispersing plants species and high degrees of endemism. Selective logging took place in 1994–1995, leaving logging roads through the reserve area. The park is subject to many threats to its ecosystem, mainly due to logging, poaching, agricultural activities and coastal development. Construction of the Memve'ele hydroelectric dam and the Kribi deep-sea port represent additional threats to the biodiversity of the region. Due to the high biodiversity and need for continued and sustainable conservation, Campo Ma'an has been proposed as a pilot ecotourism site.

== Impact on Indigenous Peoples ==
The region of Cameroon where the Campo Ma'an Reserve is located is traditional territory of two main indigenous groups, the Bagyeli (Pygmies) and Bantu, who have resided in this location for over 4000 years. The Bagyeli are traditionally subsistence hunter gatherers, relying on the forest to provide resources, including medicinal plants. This group represents the minority of the indigenous people in the area with an estimated population under 10 000. The Bantu occupy coastal areas and are primarily fishermen. The Bantu have a larger population, which is divided into smaller groups; the Batanga, the Mabea, the Yassa, the Ntumu, the Mavae and the Bulu. The latter three groups occupy areas farther inland and rely on subsistence agriculture. A third ethnic group originating in eastern Cameroon, the Bebilis, also inhabit the area and, similar to the Bagyeli, reside in hunting camps. Currently, there are over 100 villages in the vicinity of the Campo Ma'an National Park.

The signing of the Campo Ma'an GEF/Biodiversity Project in December 1999 introduced new funding for the park, allowing for the enforcement of rules barring the use of natural resources from the protected area. Prior to this, there were no eco-guards or enforcement restricting access to the park area. The Integral Protection Zone, covering 2,901 square kilometers is completely off limits to local people and natural resource extraction is prohibited throughout 4,196 square kilometers of the region. There have been conflicts between local populations due to restricted hunting access, with one incident in May 2000 resulting in the burning of a disputed hunting camp by eco-guards. In April 2001, a Bagyeli pirogue used to access a region of the protected area was also destroyed by eco-guards. There are reports of ongoing illegal hunting and poaching within the reserve area, although between 2011 and 2014 it was cited that human hunting pressure declined by 50 percent. The WWF report on their website that a formal co-management agreement has been signed with the Bagyeli, and currently 15 Bagyeli have been employed as guides and trackers in great ape conservation initiatives.

== See also ==
- Communes of Cameroon
