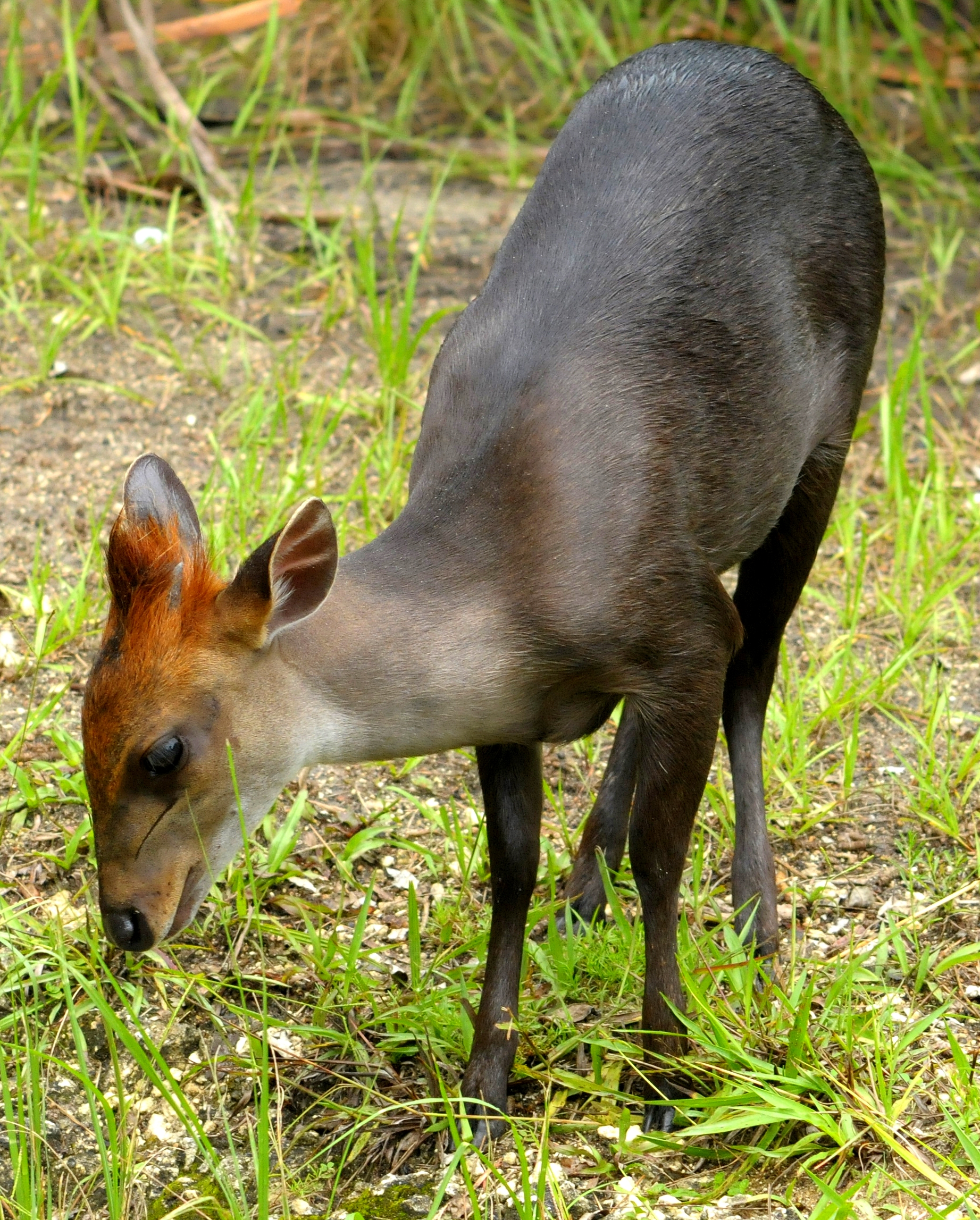
- Cephalophus niger

Conservation status
- Least Concern (IUCN 3.1)

Scientific classification
- Kingdom: Animalia
- Phylum: Chordata
- Class: Mammalia
- Order: Artiodactyla
- Family: Bovidae
- Subfamily: Antilopinae
- Genus: Cephalophorus
- Species: C. niger

Binomial name
- Cephalophorus niger Gray, 1846
- Distribution of Black duiker

= Black duiker =

Species of mammal

The black duiker (Cephalophorus niger), also known as tuba in Dyula, is a forest-dwelling duiker found in the southern parts of Sierra Leone, Liberia, Côte d'Ivoire, Ghana, Benin, and Nigeria.

The black duiker stands around 500 mm (20 in) tall at the shoulder and weighs 15 to 20 kg (33 to 44 lb). It has, not surprisingly, a black coat. The head is a rust colour with a large red crest between the ears. The black duiker has long, thin horns of 80 to 170 mm (3.1 to 6.7 in), but the horns of females reach only 30 mm (1.2 in).

The black duiker lives mainly in lowland rainforests, where it eats fruit, flowers, and leaves which have fallen from the canopy. It is probably diurnal, though this is surmised only from captive specimens. Black duiker are reported to be solitary, territorial animals.

The mating season of the black duiker is year round, but more offspring are born from November to January. The gestation period lasts 126 days, and is thus comparably short, usually only one young is born. Its average weight is 1.94 kg (4.3 lb); it is weaned around 90 days of age. The birth interval is seven and a half months. In captivity, the black duiker lives up to 14 years.

An estimated 100,000 black duikers are left in the world; they are threatened by hunting and are considered to be in decline across their range.
