= Ipassa Makokou Biosphere Reserve =

Protected area of Gabon

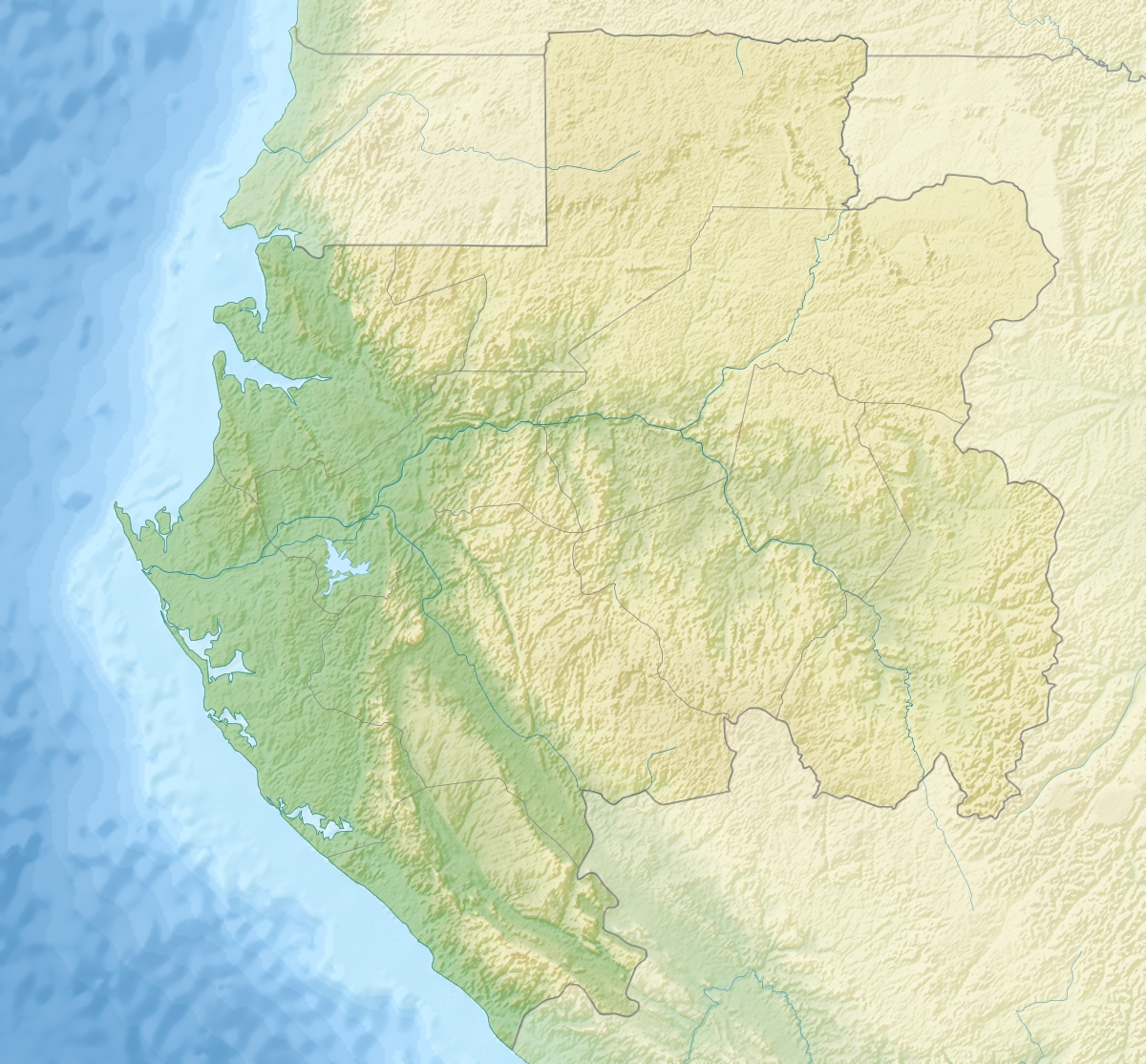
- Location within Gabon
- Location: North-eastern Gabon
- Nearest city: Makokou
- Coordinates: 00°28′00″N 12°43′00″E
- Area: 150 km^{2} (58 sq mi)
- Established: 1963

The Ipassa Makokou Biosphere reserve is situated in Gabon and covers 150 km^{2} (58 sq mi). Situated along the banks of the Ivindo River, Ipassa-Makokou Biosphere Reserve represents an example of the dense tropical rainforest of the Congo-Guinean phytogeographic region.

== History ==
The core area of the reserve is exceptionally well studied since long-term monitoring plots have been set up in 1963. There is a functioning research station in the area. Studies have also been carried out on agroforestry. In 1985, most research activity ceased, and an increase in poaching and human encroachment took place. Numerous proposals for rehabilitating the research center have been put forward, but the site remains comparatively underused

== Environment ==
The biosphere reserve is Gabon's only area where no forest exploitation takes place thus the core area is in a relatively pristine state. Within the 15,000 hectares of the biosphere reserve, more than 2,000 plant species and 600 species of mammals, reptiles, fish, amphibians and birds have been recorded. Among the most threatened plant species are Ardisia belingensis and Rhaptopetalum belingensis. The reserve has been designated an Important Bird Area (IBA) by BirdLife International because it supports significant populations of many bird species.

No people are living within the biosphere reserve. However, many villages are located along the southern bank of the Ivindo River. The main human activities include traditional agriculture, stock raising and the use of forest resources.
