= Diospyros consolatae =

Scientific classification
- Kingdom: Plantae
- Clade: Tracheophytes
- Clade: Angiosperms
- Clade: Eudicots
- Clade: Asterids
- Order: Ericales
- Family: Ebenaceae
- Genus: Diospyros
- Species: D. consolatae

Binomial name
- Diospyros consolatae Chiov.

Synonyms
- Diospyros consolataei; Diospyros vaughaniae Dunkley

Species of tree

Diospyros consolatae is a tree of the genus Diospyros, native to eastern Africa.

== Ecology ==
D. consolatae has a native range from Somalia to Mozambique.
