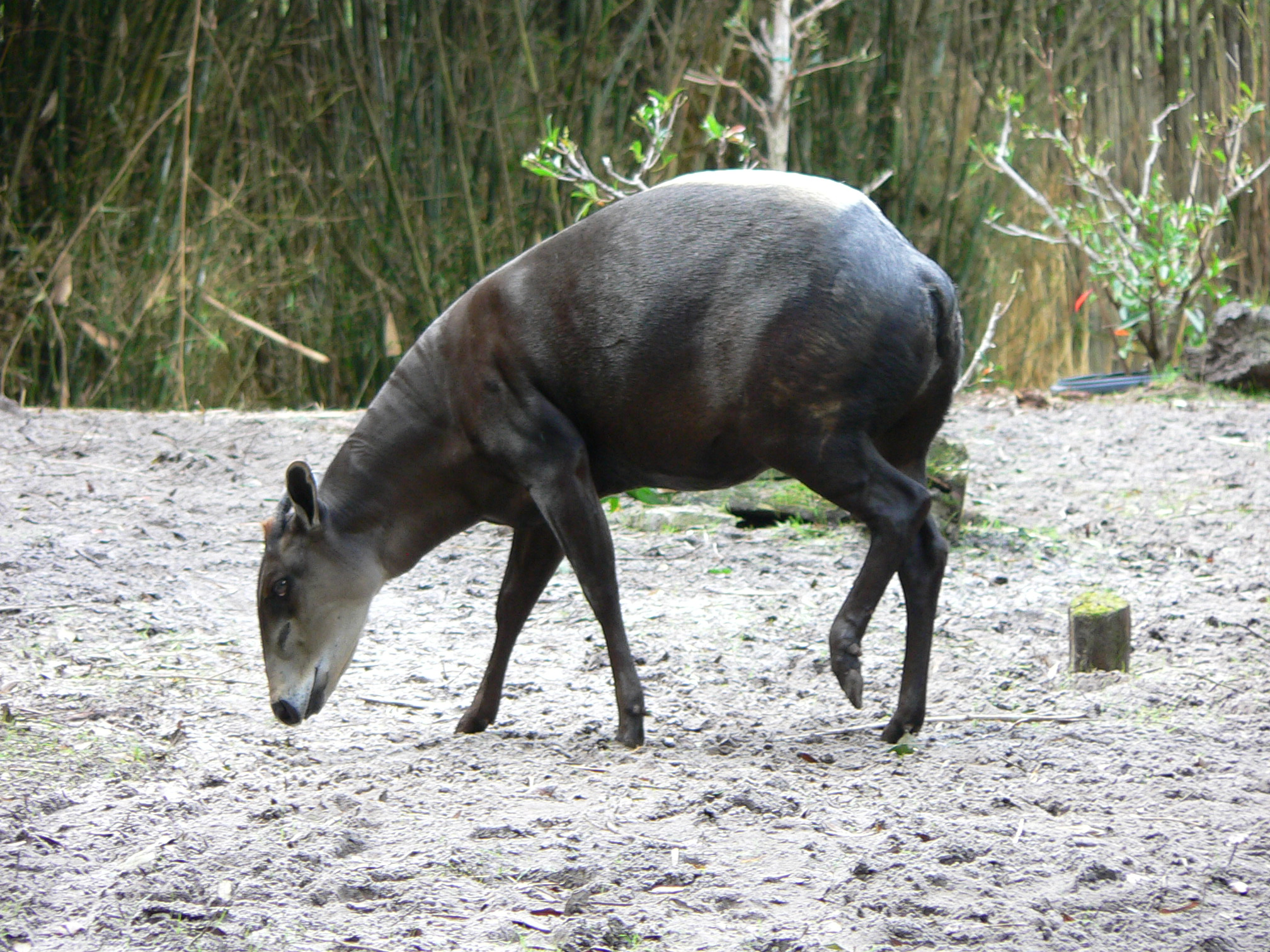
- C. s. silvicultor at Disney's Animal Kingdom

Conservation status
- Near Threatened (IUCN 3.1)
- CITES Appendix II

Scientific classification
- Kingdom: Animalia
- Phylum: Chordata
- Class: Mammalia
- Order: Artiodactyla
- Family: Bovidae
- Subfamily: Antilopinae
- Genus: Cephalophus
- Species: C. silvicultor

Binomial name
- Cephalophus silvicultor (Afzelius, 1815)
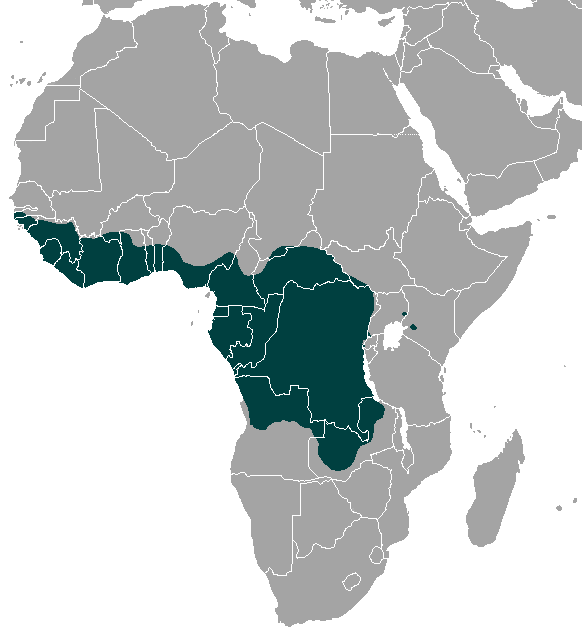
- Distribution of yellow-backed duiker

Synonyms
- Antilope sylvicultrix (Afzelius, 1815); C. punctulatus Gray, 1850; C. sclateri Jentink, 1901; C. sylvicultor Thomas, 1892

= Yellow-backed duiker =

Species of antelope

The yellow-backed duiker (Cephalophus silvicultor) is a shy, forest-dwelling antelope of the order Artiodactyla, from the family Bovidae. Yellow-backed duikers are the most widely-distributed of all duikers. They are found mainly in Central and Western Africa, ranging from Senegal and Gambia on the western coast, through to the Democratic Republic of the Congo to western Uganda; their distribution continues southward into Rwanda, Burundi, and most of Zambia.

== Taxonomy and etymology ==
The scientific name of the yellow-backed duiker is Cephalophus silvicultor. It is the type species of Cephalophus, and placed in the subfamily Cephalophinae and family Bovidae. The species was first described by Swedish botanist Adam Afzelius in the journal Nova Acta Regiæ Societatis Scientiarum Upsaliensis in 1815. The generic name has possibly originated from the combination of the New Latin word cephal, meaning head, and the Greek word lophos, meaning crest. The specific name silvicultor is composed by two Latin words: silva, meaning wood, and cultus, which relates to cultivation. This refers to its habitat.

In 1981, Colin Groves and Peter Grubb identified three subgenera of Cephalophus: Cephalophula, Cephalpia and Cephalophus. They classified C. silvicultor under the third subgenus along with C. spadix (Abbott's duiker), C. dorsalis (bay duiker) and C. jentinki (Jentink's duiker). This subgenus is characterized by minimal sexual dimorphism and spotted coats (of juveniles). C. silvicultor forms a superspecies with C. spadix.

Four subspecies are recognised:

- C. s. curticeps Grubb and Groves, 2002
- C. s. longiceps Gray, 1865
- C. s. ruficrista Bocage, 1869
- C. s. silvicultor (Afzelius, 1815)

== Description ==
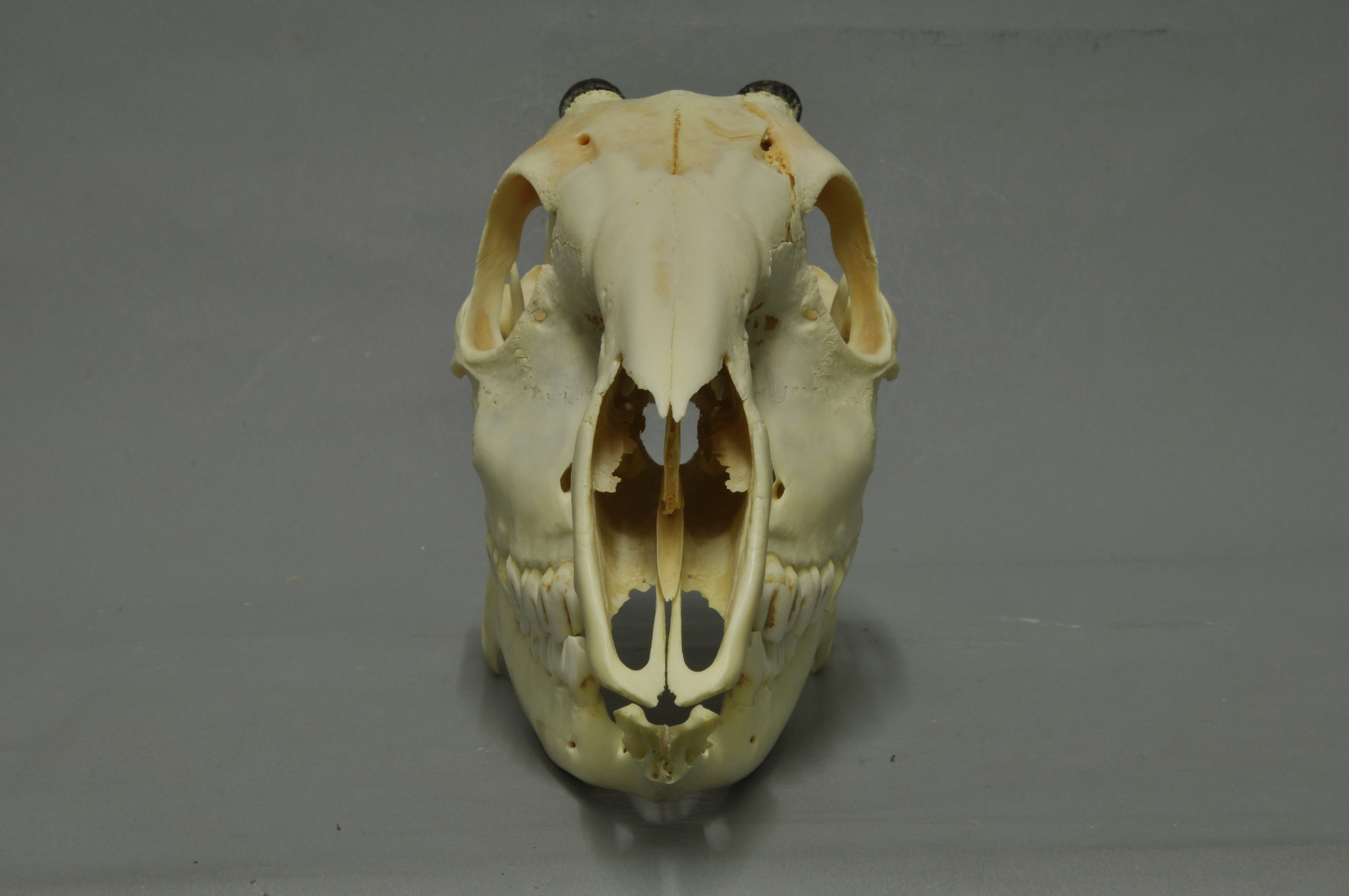
Skull of a yellow-backed duiker

Yellow-backed duikers have a convex body shape, standing taller at the rump than the shoulders. They have very short horns, 8.5 to 21 cm (3.3 to 8.3 in) in length, which are cylindrical and ribbed at the base. An orange crest of hair can be found between their horns. Yellow-backed duikers get their name from the characteristic patch of yellow hairs on their rump, which stand when the duiker is alarmed or feels threatened. Yellow-backed duiker females often grow to be slightly larger than males. Coloration is very similar between sexes and very little sexual dimorphism exists. The head-and-body length is 115 to 145 cm (45 to 57 in), with a short tail measuring 11 to 18 cm (4.3 to 7.1 in). The yellow-backed duiker weighs in at about 60–80 kg (130–180 lb), making it the largest of its genus. It has a large mouth, throat and jaw musculature.

== Ecology ==
=== Habitat and behaviour ===
Yellow-backed duikers are mainly forest dwelling and live in semi-deciduous forests, rain forests, riparian forests, and montane forests. However, they can be found in open bush, isolated forest islands, and clearings on the savanna as well. Their convex body shape is well-suited for forest living. It allows for quick movement through thick forest and bush and is reflective of ungulates accustomed to diving quickly into the underbrush for cover. In fact, duiker is the Afrikaans word for "diver".

Duikers are very flighty and easily stressed, and when frightened or pursued will run almost blindly from a threat. At the Los Angeles Zoo, duikers were found to run headlong into the glass of their enclosures if startled. In captivity, duikers have been known to form stress-induced jaw abscesses.

Yellow-backed duikers are active at all times of the day and night. They live mainly solitarily or in couples, rarely in even small herds. Their elusive habits mean that very little is known about their ecology and demography compared to other ungulates.

The yellow-backed duiker can breed throughout the year, with many breeding two times each year. The female gives birth to a single offspring (or rarely, two) after a gestation period of four to seven months. The calf remains hidden during the first week of life and is weaned at three to five months after birth. Sexual maturity happens at 12 to 18 months in the male, and at 9 to 12 months in the female.

The lifespan is 10 to 12 years in the wild, while 22.5 years in the captivity.

=== Diet ===
These forest dwelling antelope feed selectively on plants or plant parts such as shoots, roots, leaves, and buds, but their diet is mainly made up of fruits. The yellow-backed duiker is more efficient at digesting poor quality food than most other duiker species. This allows them to eat large, low quality fruits. Their diet makes them very hard to keep in captivity as most domesticated fruits are not well suited to their low fiber requirements. They are considered concentrate selectors, meaning they eat "diets relatively low in fiber, have a well developed ability to forage selectively, a rumen bypass, a rapid passage and high fermentation rate for starch, and they frequently encounter toxins."

Yellow-backed duikers are one of the few antelopes that can eat meat. Occasionally, these forest antelopes will kill and eat small animals, such as birds.

== Phylogeny ==
Duikers are very primitive antelope which diverged early in bovid history. The genus Cephalophus contains 16 African bovids of which the yellow-backed duiker is the largest. Cephalophus refers to the long crest of hair found between their horns. The yellow-backed duiker is most closely related to the Abbot's duiker and the Jentink's duiker. These three form the large or "giant" duikers group. The yellow-backed duiker belongs to a group of morphologically, ecologically, and behaviorally convergent mammals which also includes some artiodactyls, rodents, and lagomorphs which exhibit "microcursorial adaptive syndrome". This means they have tropical to subtropical distribution along with small body size, swift, cursorial locomotion, browse on high energy food, have precocial young, and a "facultatively monogamous social structure".

== Bushmeat hunting ==
Duikers are the most heavily hunted species across forested West and Central Africa. It is not only a vital food source for people living close to its habitats but a vital source of income as well. The animal's flighty, easy-to-scare nature causes the yellow-backed duiker to freeze up in torchlight which makes them very easy to hunt at night. When the animal is stunned by torchlight, hunters can almost walk right up to it. This puts the yellow-backed duiker and its relatives at major risk for overhunting. Some scientists even project that by the year 2020 they may be at serious risk. IUCN currently puts the yellow-backed duiker's status at near threatened but if current trends continue, "the yellow-backed duiker's distribution will become increasingly fragmented and its status will eventually become threatened." It is thought that the yellow-backed duiker may already be locally extinct in the Oban Sector of the Cross River National Park in the Oban Hills Region of Nigeria. The loss of this species may have many impacts due to the yellow-backed duiker's numerous ecological responsibilities. They not only make up a main source of food for many indigenous peoples, but they also act as seed dispersing agents for various plants, and prey items for many carnivores.
