= Mossapoula =

- Location in Central African Republic
- Coordinates: 2°57′36″N 16°15′44″E
- Country: Central African Republic
- Prefecture: Sangha-Mbaéré
- Sub-prefecture: Bayanga
- Commune: Yobe-Sangha

Population (2021)
  - Total: 979

Mossapoula, also spelled Moussapola, Mossapola, or Mossaboula, is a village situated near Bayanga town in Sangha-Mbaéré Prefecture, Central African Republic.

== History ==
In 1993, Mossapoula had a population of 380 people, 300 of whom were Baka.

== Economy ==
Agriculture and hunting are the main economic activities for the villagers. Since 1990, the residents have only been able to hunt 10 km from the village's eastern side since it is located within Dzanga-Sangha Special Reserve. The presence of the Baka people created the village's tourism industry.

== Education ==
The village has one primary school which were constructed were funded under the Dzanga-Sangha Project. The school lessons are delivered in Baka language.

== Healthcare ==
Mossapoula has one health post.
