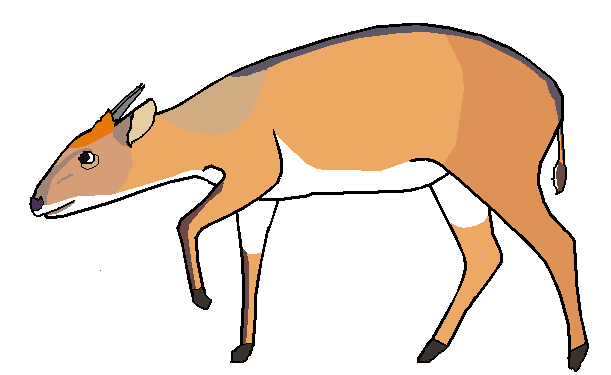

Conservation status
- Near Threatened (IUCN 3.1)

Scientific classification
- Kingdom: Animalia
- Phylum: Chordata
- Class: Mammalia
- Order: Artiodactyla
- Family: Bovidae
- Subfamily: Antilopinae
- Genus: Cephalophorus
- Species: C. leucogaster

Binomial name
- Cephalophorus leucogaster Gray, 1873
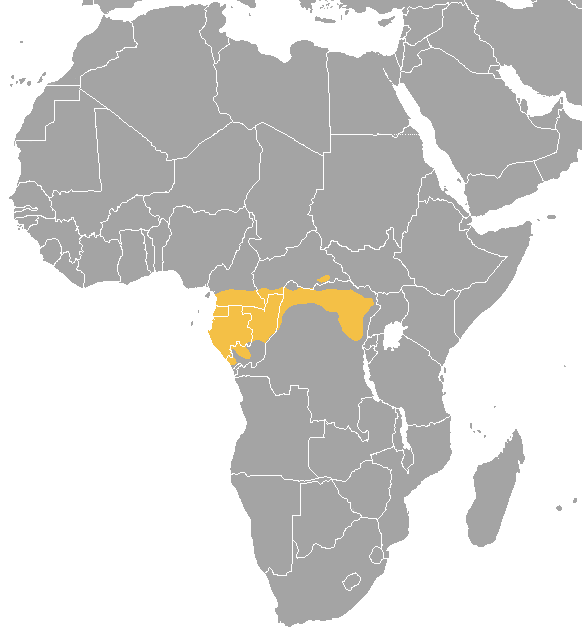
- Distribution of white-bellied duiker

= White-bellied duiker =

Species of mammal

The white-bellied duiker (Cephalophorus leucogaster) is a duiker found in central Africa. Little is known on the ecology of the species, and only some information on habitat and diet is available.

The white-bellied duiker ranges in Cameroon, the Central African Republic, the Republic of the Congo, the Democratic Republic of the Congo, Equatorial Guinea, and Gabon, while it is likely to have been extirpated in Uganda.

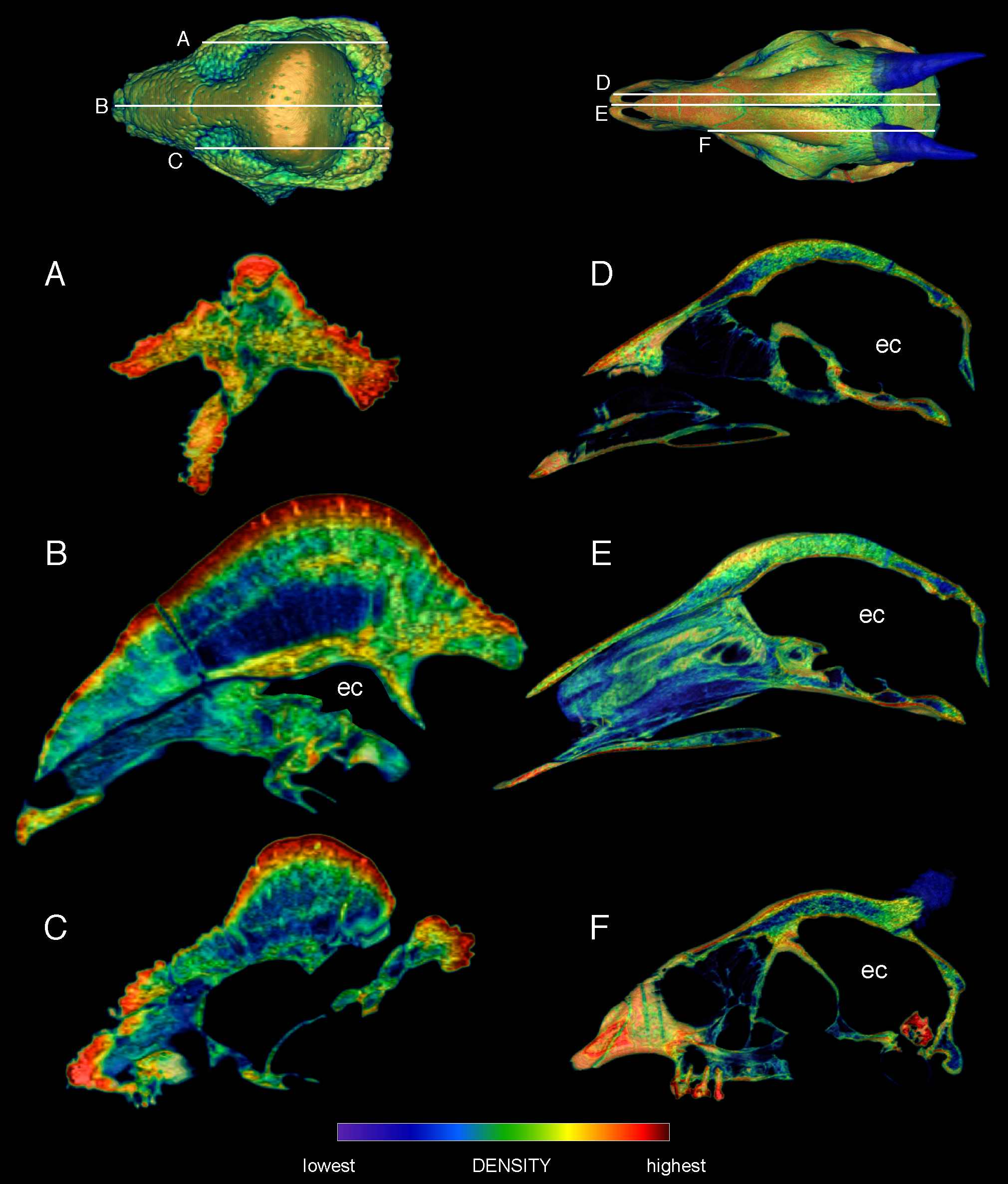
Sections through the skulls of the dinosaur Stegoceras validum (left) and Cephalophorus leucogaster (right).
