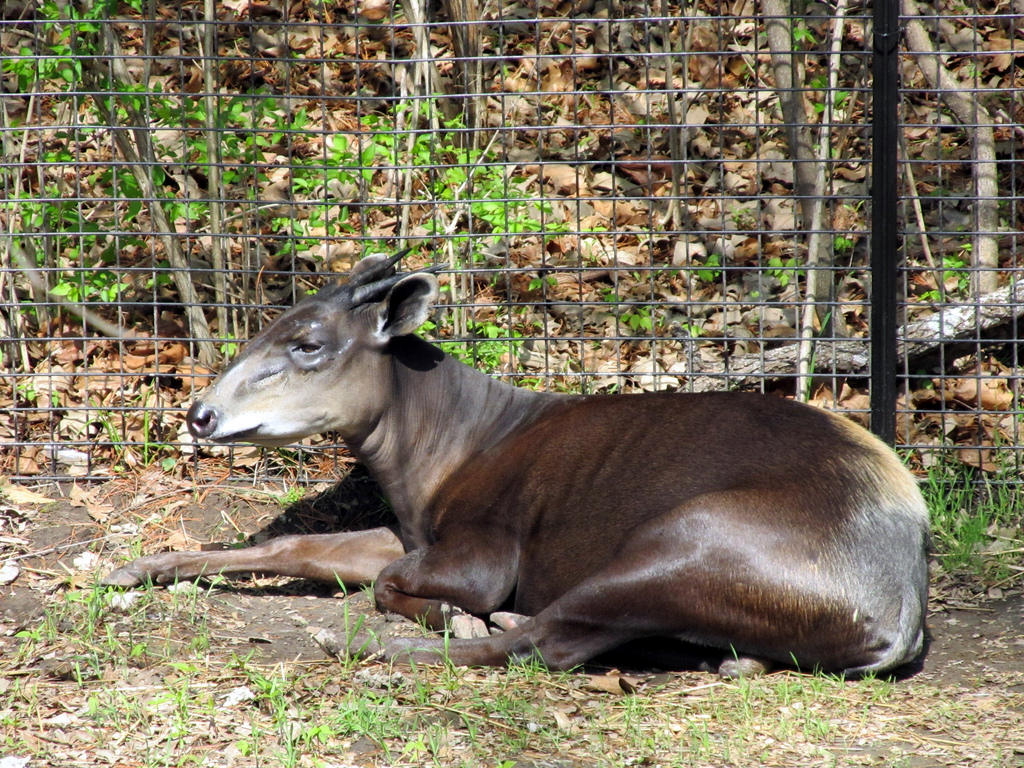
- Cephalophus silvicultor

Scientific classification
- Kingdom: Animalia
- Phylum: Chordata
- Class: Mammalia
- Order: Artiodactyla
- Family: Bovidae
- Subfamily: Antilopinae
- Tribe: Cephalophini
- Genus: Cephalophus; Smith, 1827

Type species
- Antilope silvicultrix Afzelius, 1815

= Cephalophus =

Genus of mammals

Cephalophus is a mammal genus which contains at four species of duiker, a type of small antelope.

== Species ==
The are four species assigned to this genus:

- Bay duiker Cephalophus dorsalis
- Jentink's duiker Cephalophus jentinki
- Yellow-backed duiker Cephalophus silvicultor
- Abbott's duiker Cephalophus spadix
