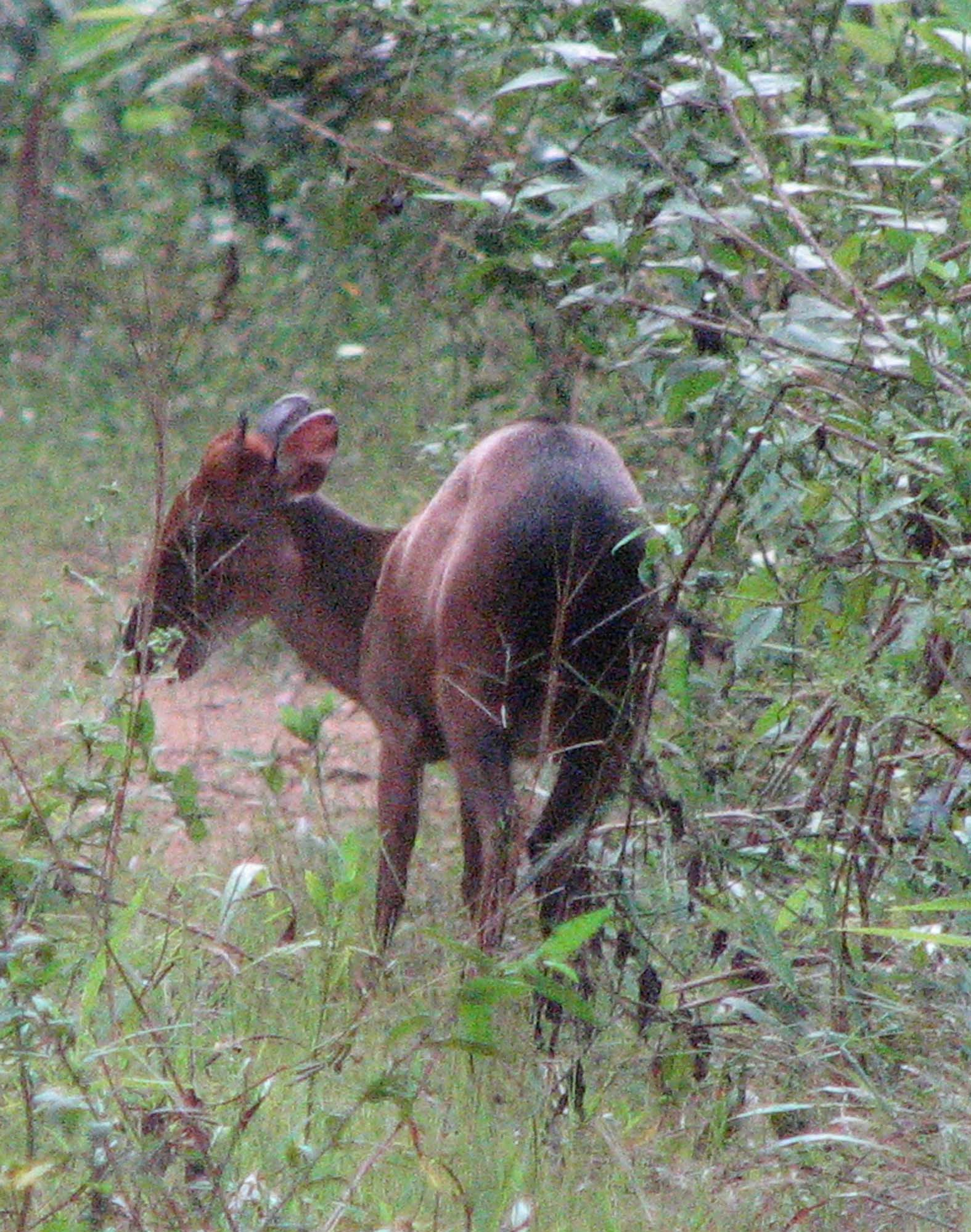
- Photographed in Campo Ma'an National Park

Conservation status
- Least Concern (IUCN 3.1)

Scientific classification
- Kingdom: Animalia
- Phylum: Chordata
- Class: Mammalia
- Order: Artiodactyla
- Family: Bovidae
- Subfamily: Antilopinae
- Genus: Cephalophorus
- Species: C. callipygus

Binomial name
- Cephalophorus callipygus Peters, 1876
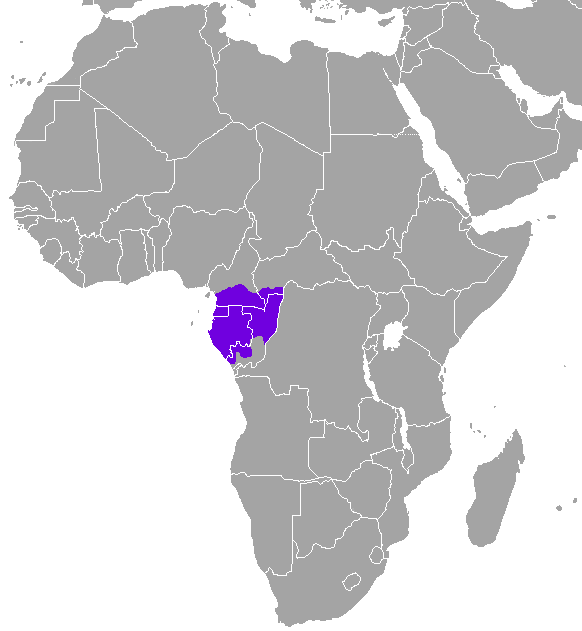
- Distribution of Peters' duiker

= Peters's duiker =

Peters' duiker

Species of mammal

Peters' duiker (Cephalophorus callipygus) is a small antelope found in Gabon, Equatorial Guinea, southern Cameroon, and northern Republic of the Congo.

Peters' duiker typically weighs about 40 lb (18 kg), and is about 20 in (510 mm) high at the shoulder. It has a grey-brown coat, and lives in dense undergrowth in mountain rainforests. Peters's duiker is a diurnal species, with peak activity between dawn and dusk.

== Conservation Status ==
The total population is estimated at 380,000 individuals, with a declining trend. Habitat loss and poaching are considered the main drivers of this decline, particularly poaching through snare traps targeting the animal for bushmeat. This is despite protective measures in some national parks.
