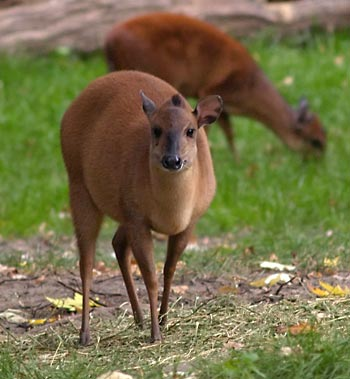

Conservation status
- Least Concern (IUCN 3.1)

Scientific classification
- Kingdom: Animalia
- Phylum: Chordata
- Class: Mammalia
- Order: Artiodactyla
- Family: Bovidae
- Subfamily: Antilopinae
- Genus: Cephalophorus
- Species: C. natalensis

Binomial name
- Cephalophorus natalensis A. Smith, 1834
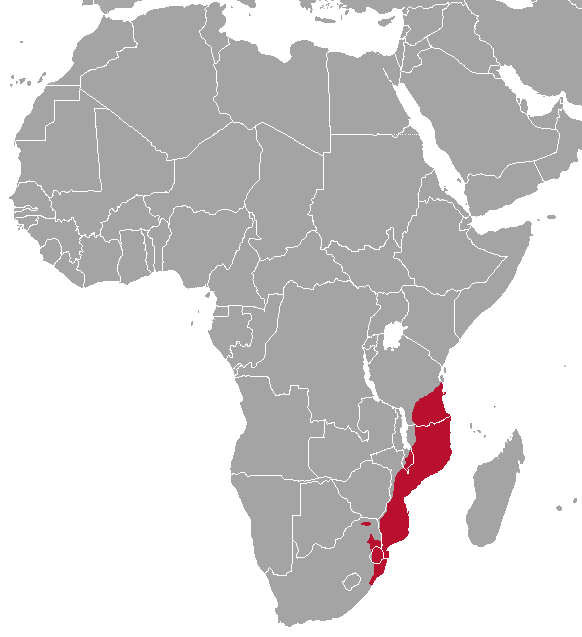
- native range

Synonyms
- Cephalophorus harveyi Thomas, 1893

= Red forest duiker =

Species of mammal

The red forest duiker, Natal duiker, or Natal red duiker (Cephalophorus natalensis) is a small antelope found in central to southern Africa. While the red forest duiker is very similar to the common duiker, it is smaller in size and has a distinguishing reddish coloring. Additionally, the red forest duiker favors a denser bush habitat than the common duiker. The Natal red duiker is more diurnal and less secretive than most forest duikers, so therefore it is easier for it to be observed. In 1999, the red forest duiker had an estimated wild population of 42,000 individuals.

== Description ==
The red forest duiker has a body length of up to 1 m (3.3 ft), a typical shoulder height of 43 cm (17 in), and an average mass of 14 kg (31 lb). Both sexes have short, straight horns about 6 cm (2.4 in) long, although in females they may be smaller in size. Towards the base, the horns have coarse rings and longitudinal striations, but they are smooth towards the tips. The longest recorded length of horns for the red forest duiker is 11 cm (4.3 in).

The red forest duiker is a rich reddish-brown in color, although the underparts are typically paler. The hairs on the chin, throat, and insides of the ears are commonly a shade of white. A tuft of reddish-brown and black hairs grow between the horns, and the tail has a white tip.

A notable characteristic of the Natal red duiker's appearance is its hunched back, with front legs shorter than the hind legs. These longer hind legs are in a crouched position, which serves as an advantage when the duiker senses danger and needs to flee by allowing the individual to leap quickly into nearby bush.

== Behavior and social organization ==
The red forest duiker tends to roam singly, in pairs, or small family groups, and it is rare to see a group of more than three individuals. The cry of the red forest duiker is rather distinctive, loud, and penetrating, sounding somewhere between a snort and a whistle. The call of a duiker becomes a throaty cry when the animal is distressed. When the duiker has been spotted by a predator, it will first freeze, and then bound away with the characteristic duiker diving motion into the safety of the thick bush. Some of the common predators of the red duiker include eagles, Southern African rock pythons, and leopards.

Also, the red forest duiker is quite territorial, and it often marks its territory by using a substance secreted from the maxillary glands near its eyes. A duiker will practice this scent marking by rubbing its face on grass, twigs, bark or other surfaces to indicate its territorial boundaries. Sometimes, the Natal red duiker will even mark its territory on its mate or calf.

The red forest duiker has an extraordinary jumping ability when compared to other ungulates, easily clearing 1.3-meter-tall (4.3 ft) nets.

== Feeding and foraging ==
The red forest duiker browses on leaves, flowers, and fruits that have fallen from trees as well as low-growing shrubs. This usually occurs during daylight, although in heavily disturbed areas duikers can become nocturnal. It is a concentrate feeder, as it does not have the ability to digest fiber well.

== Reproduction and lifespan ==
On average, the gestation period for a red duiker is about 8 months. When the young are born, they are a reddish-black, with a reddish-brown face. Usually a single calf is born, at any time of year. The young weigh about 1 kg (2.2 lb) at birth, and they will stay with their mother for approximately six to eight months. Males are not involved in rearing young, but nonetheless both sexes will respond to a distress call from the calf. The red forest duiker has a potential longevity of nine years, although some have lived up to 15 years in captivity.

== Habitat and distribution ==
The red forest duiker resides in forest and dense bush habitats in both mountainous and coastal areas, where surface water is readily available.

This species can be found in southeastern Tanzania, Malawi, extreme northeastern Zambia, Mozambique, Eswatini, southeastern Zimbabwe, and northeast South Africa. The red forest duiker can be found in Kruger National Park, Hluhluwe-Umfolozi National Park, and Tembe Elephant Park.

== Conservation threats ==
The red forest duiker's biggest threat is the clearing of its natural habitat, either for agriculture or human habitation. The Natal red duiker has disappeared from large parts of its former range, largely as a result of the loss of suitable habitat in the face of expanding human settlement, agriculture, and hunting. Nonetheless, it remains locally common within its former range. Despite the decreasing population trends, the red forest duiker retains a status of Least Concern by the IUCN.
