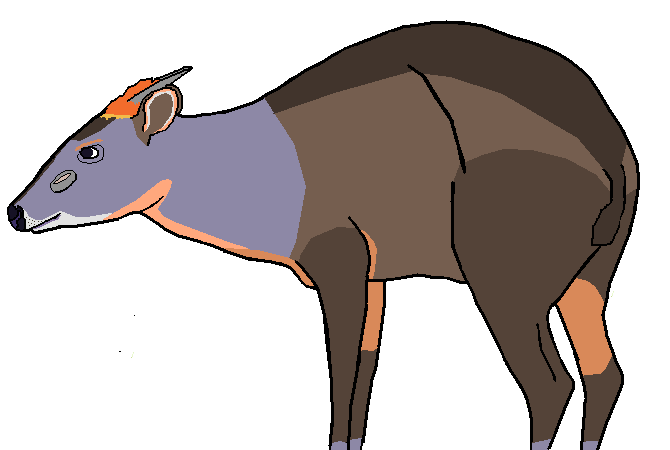

Conservation status
- Endangered (IUCN 3.1)

Scientific classification
- Kingdom: Animalia
- Phylum: Chordata
- Class: Mammalia
- Order: Artiodactyla
- Family: Bovidae
- Genus: Cephalophus
- Species: C. spadix

Binomial name
- Cephalophus spadix True, 1890
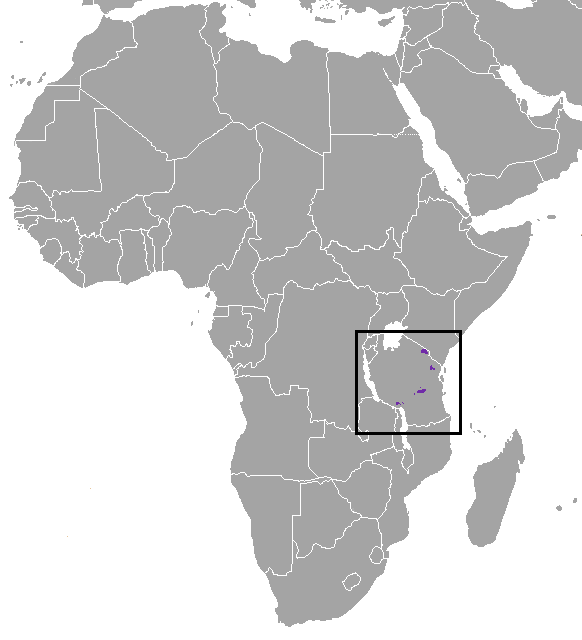
- Distribution of Abbott's duiker

= Abbott's duiker =

Species of mammal

Abbott's duiker (Cephalophus spadix), also known as minde in Swahili, is a large, forest-dwelling duiker (small antelope) found only in a few scattered enclaves in Tanzania. It may be a subspecies of the yellow-backed duiker. It is very rare, and the first photograph of an Abbott's duiker in the wild was taken as recently as 2003.

== Characteristics ==
Abbott's duikers stand around 65 cm (26 in) tall at the shoulder and weigh about 55 kg (121 lb). This duiker has a glossy, dark brown coat which is lighter on the underside. The face is paler and grey in colour, with a large red tuft on the forehead; the horns are thin and short (8 to 12 cm (3.1 to 4.7 in)). The secretive behaviour of Abbott's duiker, along with its largely nocturnal habits and preference for dense vegetation, means little is known about the ecology and behaviour of this species. It has been observed feeding on leaves in the forest understory, and on vegetation in forest clearings, and may feed on fruits, flowers and moss. An Abbott's duiker has also been seen with a frog in its mouth; duikers are known to capture and feed on live prey occasionally. The cryptic habits and alertness of Abbott's duiker unfortunately does not protect it entirely from predation. Young Abbott's duikers are probably preyed on by African crowned eagles (Stephanoetus coronatus) and pythons (Python species; Python natalensis and Python sebae), while duikers of all ages may fall victim to leopards (Panthera pardus). Lions (Panthera leo) and spotted hyenas (Crocuta crocuta) may also hunt this duiker species in some areas

== Habitat ==
Abbott's duiker is endemic to Tanzania, in the Eastern Arc Mountains, Mount Kilimanjaro, and Southern Highlands in scattered populations. They live mainly in wet forests and swamps between 1,700 and 2,700 m above sea level, but can sometimes wander to much higher elevations at 4,000 m. They eat mainly fruit and possibly other plant matter. Abbott's duikers are nocturnal, spending the days at rest in thickets. They form regular pathways through the undergrowth, making them relatively easy to find. If threatened, they generally try to run, though they have been known to kill pursuing dogs when left with no escape route.

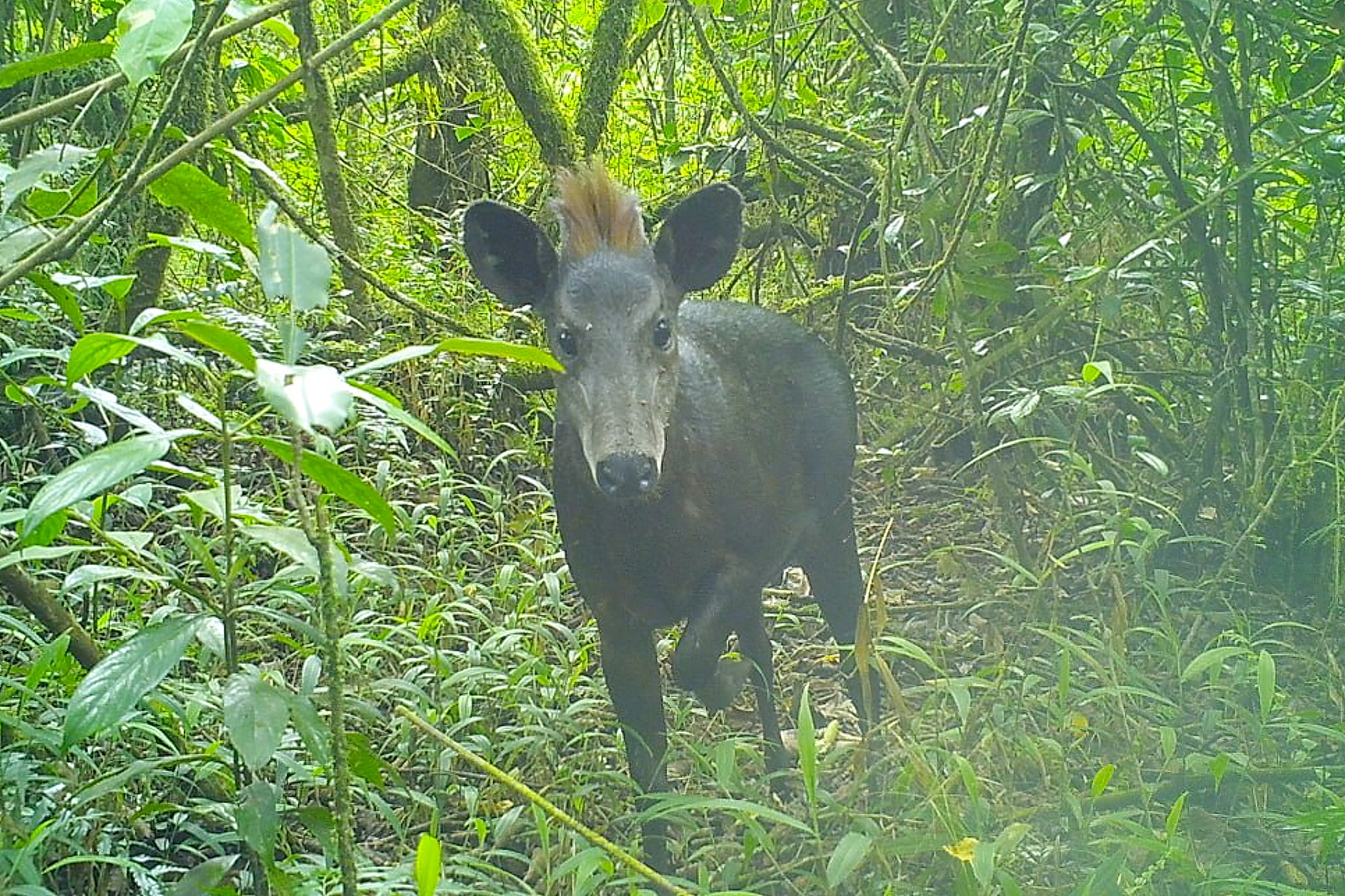
Abbott's Duiker

== Status ==
Less than 1,500 Abbott's duiker are estimated to be left in the world, with no captive population. They are threatened by habitat destruction and poaching.
