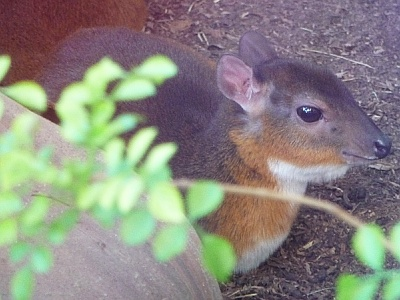
- Royal antelope (Neotragus pygmaeus)

Scientific classification
- Kingdom: Animalia
- Phylum: Chordata
- Class: Mammalia
- Order: Artiodactyla
- Family: Bovidae
- Subfamily: Antilopinae
- Tribe: Neotragini; Sclater and Thomas, (1894)

Genera
- Dorcatragus; Madoqua; Neotragus; Ourebia; Raphicerus

= Neotragini =

Tribe of mammals

The tribe Neotragini comprises the dwarf antelopes of Africa:

- Dorcatragus
  - Beira D. megalotis
- Madoqua
  - Günther's dik-dik M. guentheri
  - Kirk's dik-dik M. kirkii
  - Silver dik-dik M. piacentinii
  - Salt's dik-dik M. saltiana
- Neotragus
  - Royal antelope N. pygmaeus
- Ourebia
  - Oribi O. ourebi
- Raphicerus
  - Steenbok R. campestris
  - Cape grysbok R. melanotis
  - Sharpe's grysbok R. sharpei

Some mammalogists (Haltenorth, 1963) considered this group as a distinct subfamily (Neotraginae).
