= Grysbok =

Grysbok may refer to the following species of African antelope:

- Cape grysbok (Southern grysbok), found in the Cape region of South Africa
- Sharpe's grysbok (Northern grysbok), found in southeastern Africa
