= Raphicerus paralius =

Raphicerus paralius Temporal range: Pliocene

Scientific classification
- Kingdom: Animalia
- Phylum: Chordata
- Class: Mammalia
- Order: Artiodactyla
- Family: Bovidae
- Subfamily: Antilopinae
- Genus: Raphicerus
- Species: †R. paralius

Binomial name
- †Raphicerus paralius Gentry, 1980

Raphicerus paralius is an extinct species of bovid belonging to the genus Raphicerus that lived in the Pliocene epoch.

== Palaeoecology ==
Dental microwear texture analysis (DMTA) performed on R. paralius specimens from the Zanclean site of Langebaanweg denotes that this species was a browsing herbivore. However, only two samples were included in the study, so the authors note that the study's conclusions should be interpreted accordingly.
