= Josef Menges =

German explorer, zoologist, cartographer, trader and travel writer

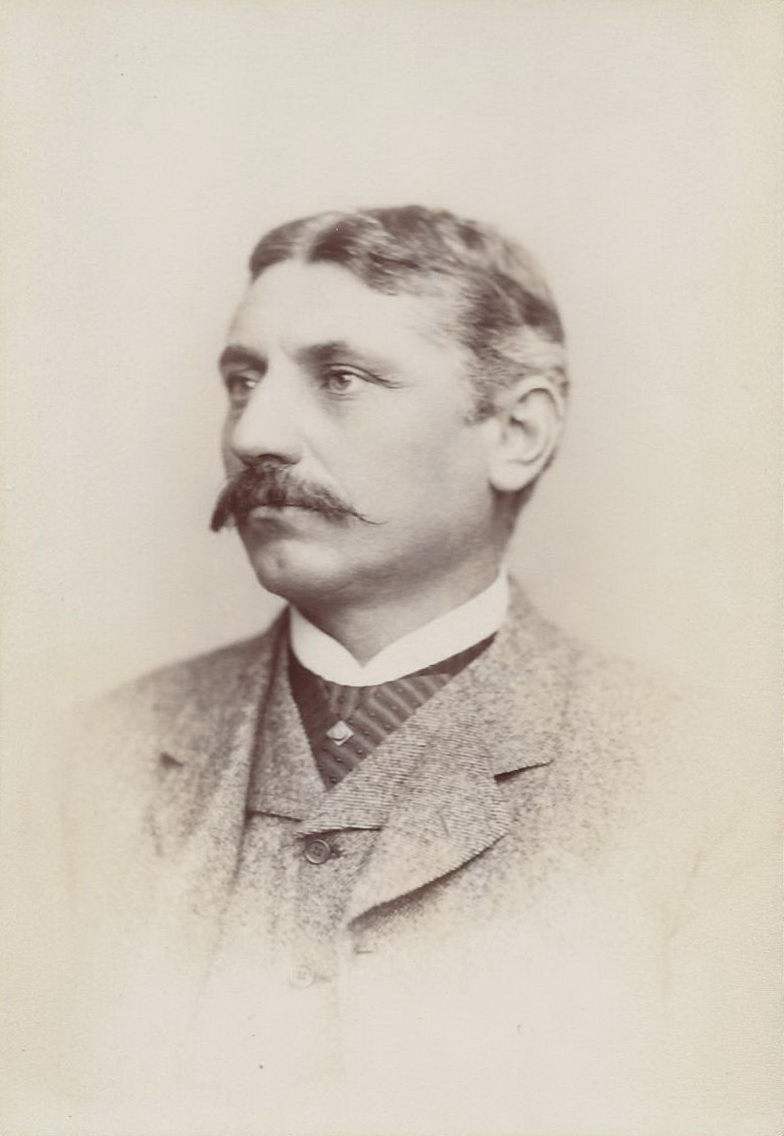
- Josef Menges (1895)
- Born: 7 October 1810; Limburg an der Lahn, Duchy of Nassau, Germany
- Died: 4 January 1910 (aged 99)
- Citizenship: German
- Occupations: Explorer, naturalist, zoologist, cartographer, trader and author
- Years active: 1870s-1890s
- Notable work: Travel and research reports on geography, zoology and ethnology of Northeast Africa and the Horn of Africa

Jakob Josef Menges (7 October 1850– 4 January 1910) was a German explorer, naturalist, zoologist, cartographer, trader and author. During the 1870s and until the end of the 19th century, Menges undertook commercial and scientific expeditions in Northeast Africa and the Horn of Africa.

His routes took him through the Turco-Egyptian Sudan, the interior of British Somaliland and Abyssinia in modern-day Ethiopia. To fund his journeys, Menges published travel and research reports on the region's geography, zoology and ethnology in German scientific journals. Later in life, he focused on animal trading, supplying exotic animals to European zoos, as well as facilitating human shows of Somali people in Europe.

== Biography ==
=== Early life and education ===
Josef Menges was the son of Joseph Menges and his wife Maria Josepha Diefenbach. His father was the last Thurn-und-Taxis postmaster of Limburg an der Lahn, actively involved in local politics and elected mayor in 1877. Josef Menges attended the Realgymnasium in Limburg and completed training as a railway official in Frankfurt am Main.

=== Travels ===
After the opening of the Suez Canal in 1869, the coastal regions of the Horn of Africa drew growing attention from foreign governments, companies, and private actors, all seeking to capitalize on their strategic, economic, and logistical advantages. As Menges was especially interested in Northeast Africa, he applied to serve under British Major-General Charles George Gordon in the Turco-Egyptian Sudan. As Gordon’s secretary, he journeyed from 1873 to 1874 along the White Nile from Khartoum down to Gondokoro in present-day South Sudan. After illness and other difficulties forced him to leave Gordon’s service, he continued traveling in the region and, around 1876, began collaborating with Hamburg circus manager Carl Hagenbeck across a broad territory extending from Egyptian Sudan to the Somali lands.

The Mahdist War in Sudan (1881–1899) severely disrupted Hagenbeck’s animal trade, effectively halting exports from the region. In response, Menges expanded his operations into Abyssinia, French Somaliland (modern-day Djibouti), and British Somaliland. At that time, the Somali territories were rich in wildlife, much of which was either shipped to Europe in large quantities or pursued locally as game.

=== Geographical reports ===
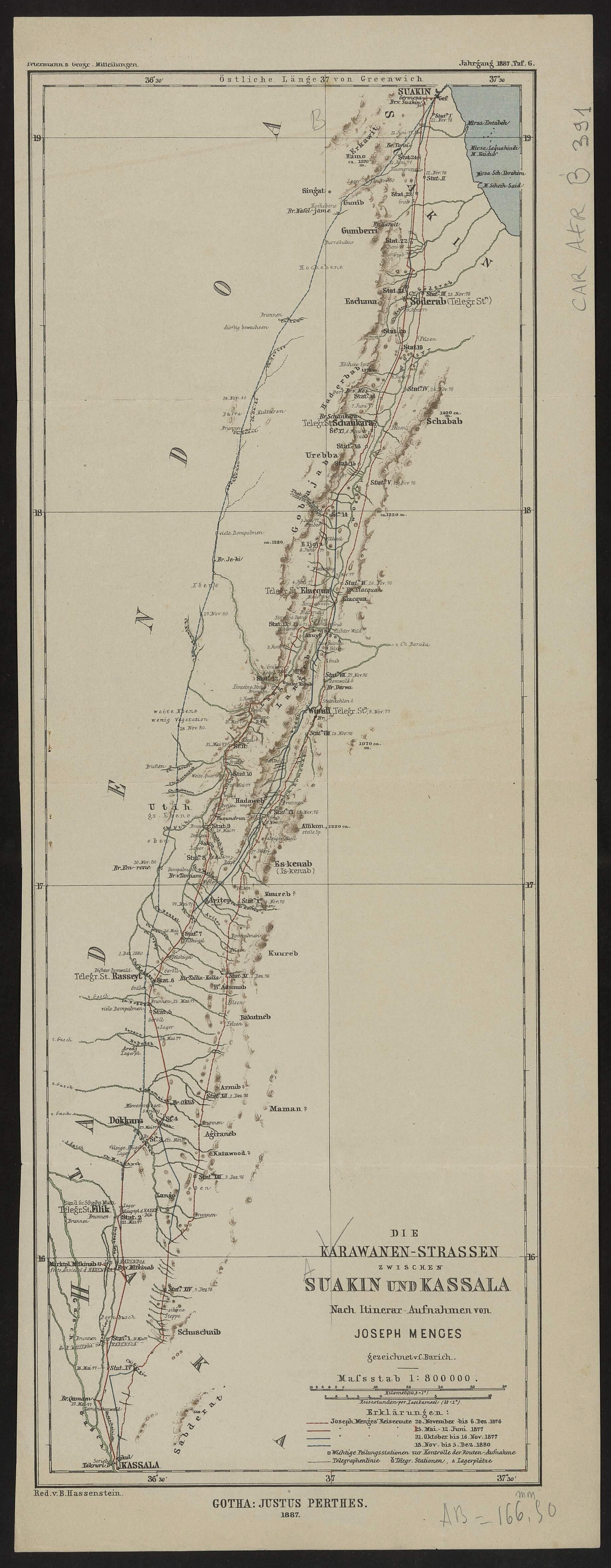
Map of the caravan trails between Suakin and Kassala, Gotha 1887

While staying in Somaliland, Menges undertook at least four major expeditions, each of which was subsequently cartographically improved and published by the Perthes publishing house in Germany. Altogether, he covered roughly 626 kilometres on foot and documented a region measuring about 6,000 square kilometers.

On his expeditions he documented climate conditions with daily meteorological measurements, determined geographical altitudes and recordings of temperatures. Based on his detailed journals, including itineraries, descriptive notes on trade routes and observations on vegetation and mountainous formations, Menges produced scientific reports and detailed hand-drawn sketches of these regions.

Menges produced small sketches for maps according to consistent principles. His equipment were a watch, a thermometer, a compass, an aneroid barometer and a degree circle. With these instruments, he took dozens of measurements every day. He worked to scale, calculating roughly 1 mm in his notebook as equal to about 100 steps on the ground (so 1 cm represented around 670 meters), and adjusted his records to account for slower travel, for example in mountainous areas. These draft maps traced his route with exact hours and minutes for each change of direction, also indicated bearings in degrees in relation to the North–South axis, and marked significant landmarks. He employed common cartographic signs — lines for routes, circles for heights— while also devising additional symbols for notable trees, forts, water wells, and ruins. These drafts were later converted into professional geographical maps, for example by cartographer Bruno Hassenstein.

Apart from Menges, other explorers had travelled and mapped regions of Northeast Africa. In 1860 Theodor von Heuglin had collaborated with Hassenstein on a map of the Red Sea and the Gulf of Aden. In 1874 Gustav Adolf Haggenmacher and August Petermann produced a map of the Berbera hinterland of Somaliland, and in 1885 Philipp Paulitschke, Hassenstein and Carl Barich mapped the route from the town of Zayla in Somaliland to Harar in Ethiopia.

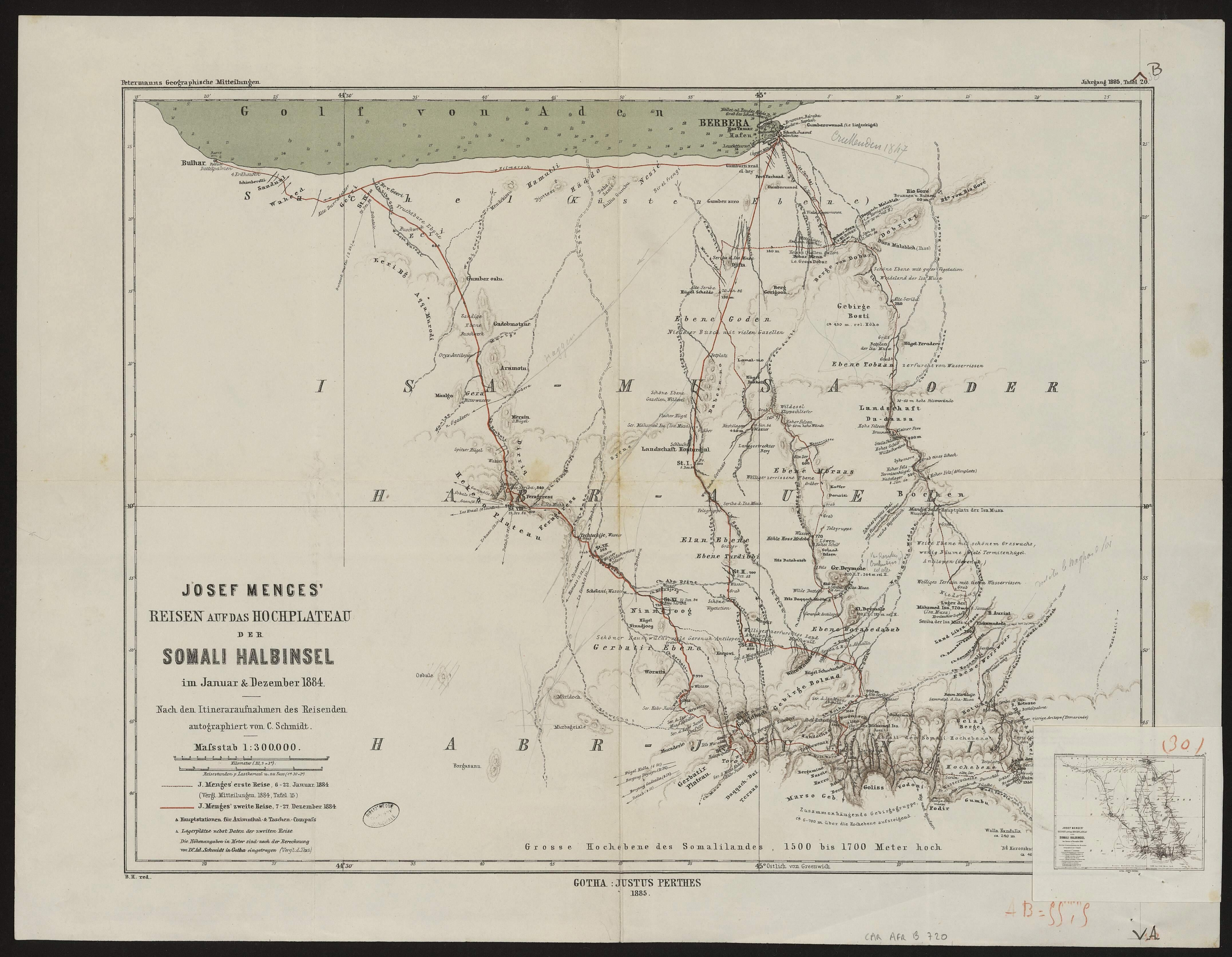
Map of Menges' travels in the high plateau of the Somali peninsula in January and December, Gotha 1884

Travel reports and geographical maps of Africa by Menges and other German cartographers were published in Petermanns Geographische Mitteilungen by Perthes publishers in Gotha, Germany. This oldest German-language geography journal produced many major geographic discoveries of the 19th and early 20th centuries. Perthes focused on these regions because new maps of little-known parts of Africa filled gaps in geographic knowledge and gave its journal exclusive material. By selling new findings by explorers on the ground, the publisher strengthened its reputation, outpaced competitors in France, Britain, and Germany, and enhanced its standing in the German Empire as an important center for overseas information.

=== Ethnographic and zoological reports ===
Menges was also interested in the people he encountered. He published his observations on their ways of life, cultures and environments in scientific journals and maintained frequent contact with leading ethnologists and ethnological museums.During his journeys he became familiar not only with foreign lands and cultures but also with their flora and fauna. He recorded observations of wildlife with the same care he applied to landscapes and climates, publishing his findings in journals such as Der Zoologische Garten and Globus – Illustrirte Zeitschrift für Länder und Völkerkunde. In his 1887 report Ausflug ins Somaliland (Excursion into Somaliland), he described two local species of antilopes and the Somali wild ass. In 1883, he obtained a foal of the same rare animal and transported it to Hamburg, where it was kept in captivity for a period. In 1894 Menges was the first to publish a scientific report about the Beira antelope species that was initially classified as a klipspringer (Oreotragus megalotis).

In addition to English, French and Italian, Menges learned several African dialects. To obtain information and establish his position, he depended largely on the support of local inhabitants. In a letter of 11 April 1883 to the editors of Petermanns Geographische Mitteilungen, he wrote:

Nor did I fail to ask the accompanying natives, who knew every detail about the land, in order to be able to write down the names of the various localities, so that I believe I have made as accurate a sketch as is at all possible of a hunting expedition that had no scientific purpose.

=== Animal trading ===
To support his expeditions financially, Menges formed a professional association in 1876 with the Hamburg circus manager and animal trainer Carl Hagenbeck. This included providing Hagenbeck with information about animal populations, possibilities for capture and logistics to transport animals to the coast and further to Europe. Menges played a central role in establishing early contacts between Somali intermediaries and Hagenbeck’s enterprise. Besides Hamburg, the Frankfurt Zoological Garden became the main hub for animal collections imported by Menges to Europe. When Adalbert Seitz became director of the Frankfurt Zoo on 1 April 1893, he provided Menges with temporary storage space, so that large animal imports could first be shown and offered there.

=== Recruiter for human zoos ===
As Carl Hagenbeck had started recruiting "African natives" for ethnographic shows in Europe, expeditions from the region supplied not only wildlife but also Nubians, Somalis, and others for such "human zoo" exhibits. At least one consignment of animals appears to have reached Hagenbeck before any Somali group was recruited for exhibition. Evidence suggests that Menges initially sought to collaborate independently with Somali partners and establish his own position in the trade. This is indicated by at least two Somali ethnographic exhibitions staged in Switzerland before 1895. One in 1889 was called “Menges’s East African Caravan” and another in 1891 “Menges’s Somali Caravan”.

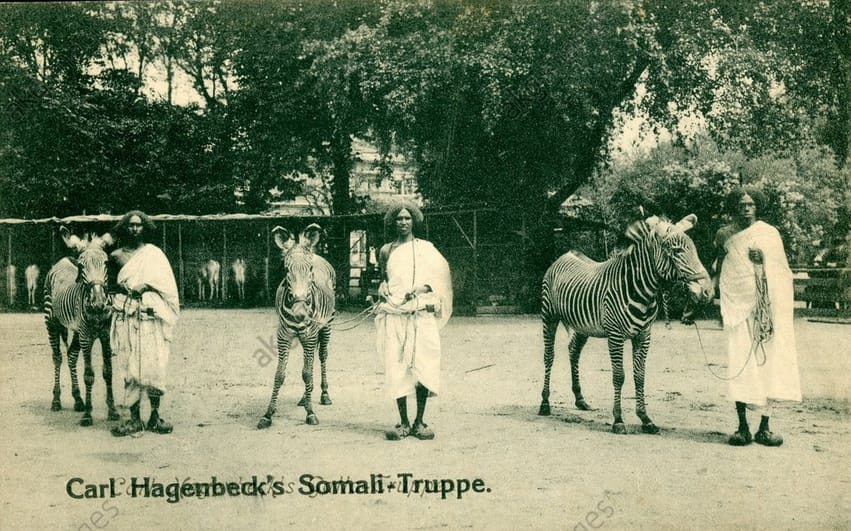
Postcard of Somali people and zebras exhibited by Carl Hagenbeck, c. 1895

At first, Menges enlisted the Somali leader Hersi Egeh Gorseh, who would later emerge as the leader of a Somali troupe as well as a trusted associate of Carl Hagenbeck and his family. Hersi, who was based in the port city of Berbera, was engaged to organize the capture and transport of wild animals from the northern Somali coast and the hinterland, assembling teams of trappers from his clan. After several successful shipments had demonstrated his reliability, Menges persuaded him to take his group of Somali people to Europe to participate in ethnographic exhibitions, called Völkerschau in German. The first Somali troupe, led by Hersi Egeh and organized by Hagenbeck in collaboration with Menges, reached Hamburg in 1895.

The same year, Hagenbeck and Menges presented this troupe along with animals from different African regions at the 1895 African Exhibition at the Crystal Palace in London. The group of animals included 25 native horses, 20 dromedaries, half a dozen lions, six ostriches, cheetahs, pumas, leopards, sheep, and birds. As The Times commented, "Herr Menges had made so many excursions into the interior since permanent relations had been established with the tribes on the coast that he was in possession of the fullest information about the country, and he experienced little difficulty in obtaining the consent of some 70 Somalis of different tribes to undertake the voyage."

== Reception ==
In the 1880s, reports by Menges were mentioned in the Scottish Geographical Magazine and the Proceedings of the Zoological Society of London. In his 1886 book about the history of the Second Punic War between Rome and Carthage, English writer William Thomas Arnold reported about two letters Menges had published in the Cologne Gazette about the possibility of taming African elephants as beasts of burden. As the British Army had used Indian elephants under general Gordon in Egyptian Sudan, Menges had suggested that the African species could be tamed as well.

In 2017, a biography was published in German, largely based on his extensive personal archive, consisting of his correspondence with the geographers from the Perthes publishing house, travel notebooks, business and private letters. According to the biographer, these documents, archived in the Perthes Collection at the University of Erfurt, allowed her to provide a portrayal that links an individual life story to the broader historical setting.

In his 2022 article titled “A Brief History of Staging Somali Ethnographic Performing Troupes in Europe, 1885–1930”, the author focused on the relationship of Menges with Hagenbeck and Hersi Egeh, the leader of a troupe of Somali people. This historical analysis ascertained the role of Menges as Hagenbeck's agent and recruiter who helped supply animals and performers for ethnographic shows in Europe.

A 2024 article about the life and work of Menges with special focus on his maps of Northeast Africa assumed that British officials in Aden may have used such maps when shaping policy for what would become the Somaliland protectorate. The maps may also have served local communities, helping them better understand their territory. In addition, regional powers such as Khedival Egypt, where Menges began his career, and Emperor Menelik II’s Ethiopia could have viewed this cartographic information as a strategic asset for territorial expansion.

Original maps or digital copies based on travels and sketches by Menges are archived at the Perthes Collection of the Erfurt University research library, the University of Jena, the Digital Library of Chambéry in France and the library of the University of Illinois. Other items collected by Menges are held in the collections of the Ethnological Museum of Berlin as well as in other public collections in Germany.
