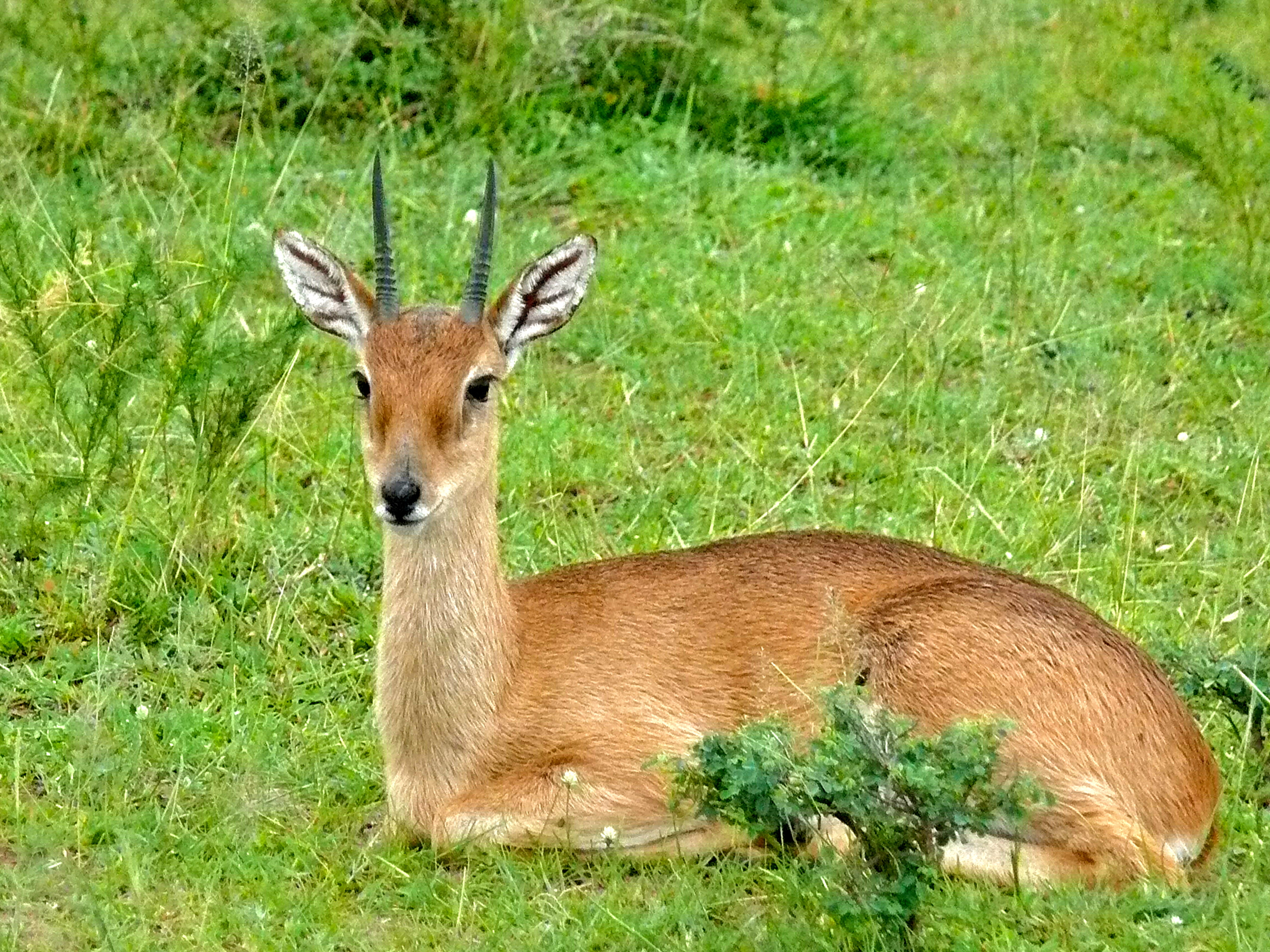
- Male
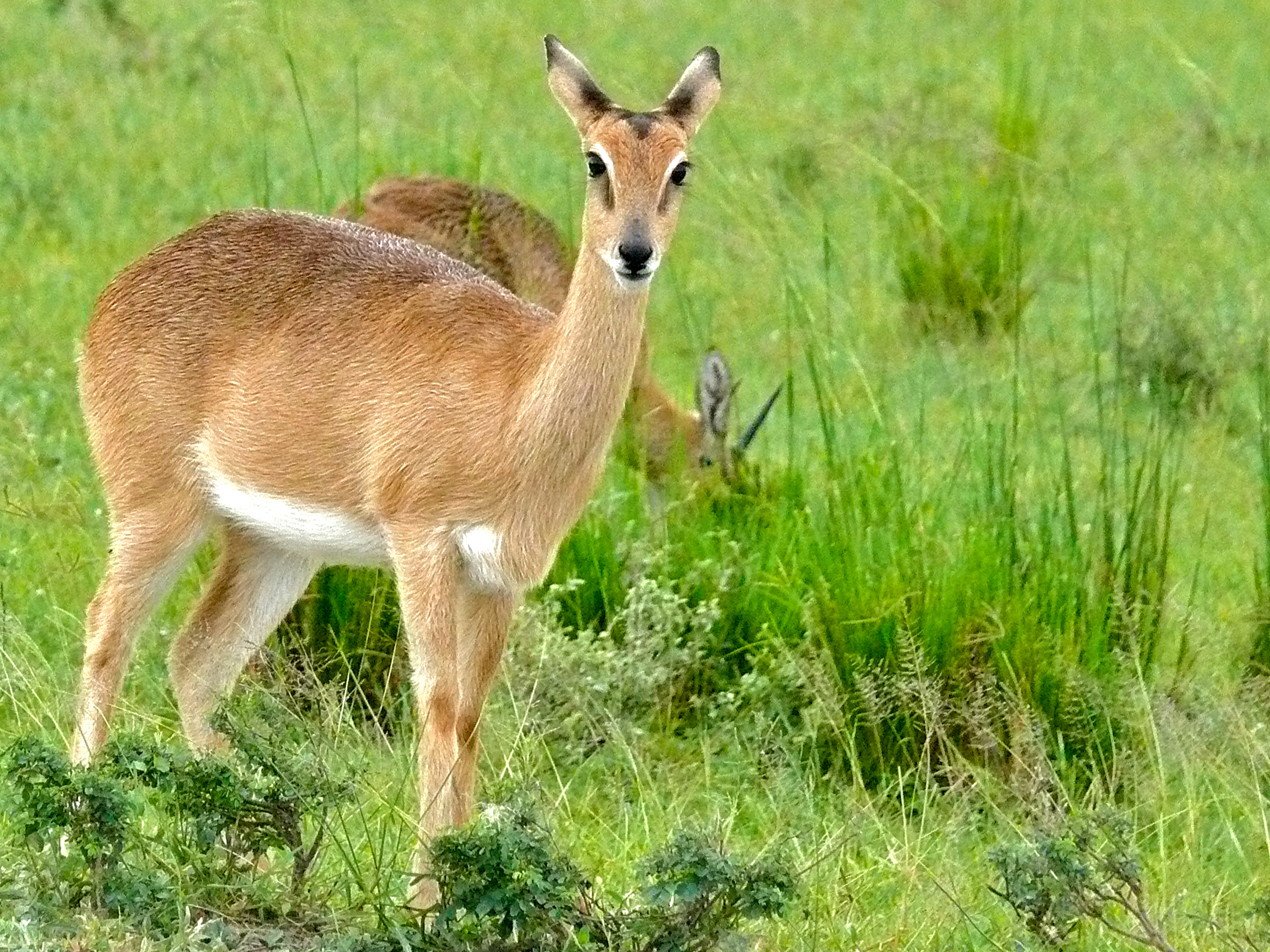
- Female both at the Murchison Falls National Park, Uganda

Conservation status
- Least Concern (IUCN 3.1)

Scientific classification
- Kingdom: Animalia
- Phylum: Chordata
- Class: Mammalia
- Order: Artiodactyla
- Family: Bovidae
- Subfamily: Antilopinae
- Genus: Ourebia; Laurillard, 1842
- Species: O. ourebi

Binomial name
- Ourebia ourebi Zimmermann, 1783

Subspecies
- See text
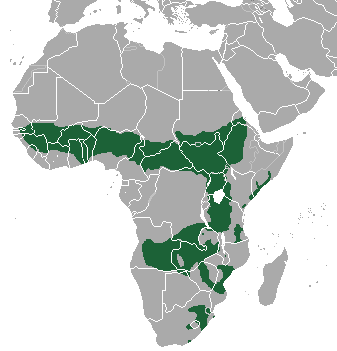
- Geographic range

Synonyms
- List: Oribia Kirby, 1899; O. aequatoria Heller, 1912; O. grayi (Fitzinger, 1869); O. masakensis Lönnberg and Gyldenstolpe, 1925; O. melanura (Bechstein, 1799); O. pitmani Ruxton, 1926; O. scoparia (Schreber, 1836); O. splendida Schwarz, 1914

= Oribi =

Species of mammal

The oribi (/ˈɔːrəbi/; Ourebia ourebi) is a small antelope found in eastern, southern and western Africa. The sole member of its genus, it was described by the German zoologist Eberhard August Wilhelm von Zimmermann in 1783. While this is the only member in the genus Ourebia, eight subspecies are identified. The oribi reaches nearly 50–67 centimetres (20–26 in) at the shoulder and weighs 12–22 kilograms (26–49 lb). It possesses a slightly raised back, and long neck and limbs. The glossy, yellowish to rufous brown coat contrasts with the white chin, throat, underparts and rump. Only males possess horns; the thin, straight horns, 8–18 centimetres (3.1–7.1 in) long, are smooth at the tips and ringed at the base.

Typically diurnal, the oribi is active mainly during the day. Small herds of up to four members are common; males defend their group's territory, 25–100 hectares (62–247 acres) large. It is primarily a grazer, and prefers fresh grasses but also browses occasionally. A seasonal breeder, the time when mating occurs varies geographically. Unlike all other small antelopes, oribi can exhibit three types of mating systems, depending on the habitat – polyandry, polygyny and polygynandry. Gestation lasts for six to seven months, following which a single calf is born; births peak from November to December in southern Africa. Weaning takes place at four to five months.

The oribi occurs in a variety of habitats – from savannahs, floodplains and tropical grasslands with 10–100 centimetres (3.9–39.4 in) tall grasses to montane grasslands at low altitudes, up to 2,000 metres (6,600 ft) above the sea level. This antelope is highly sporadic in distribution, ranging from Senegal in the west to Ethiopia and Eritrea in the east and southward to Angola and the Eastern Cape (South Africa). The oribi has been classified as Least Concern by the IUCN; numbers have declined due to agricultural expansion and competition from livestock.

== Taxonomy ==
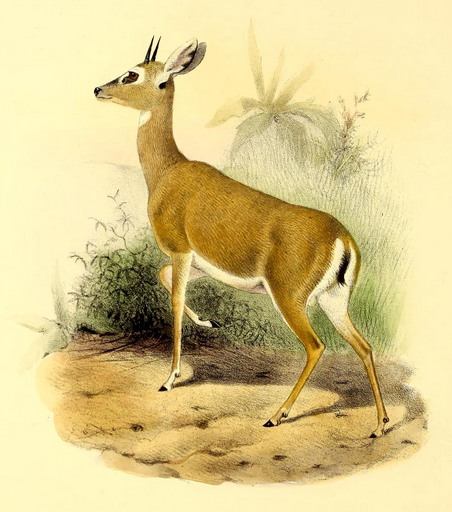
Illustration c. 1894

The scientific name of the oribi is Ourebia ourebi. The sole member of its genus, the oribi is placed under the family Bovidae. The species was first described by the German zoologist Eberhard August Wilhelm von Zimmermann in 1782. It was formerly included in the tribe Neotragini, that comprised a variety of other dwarf antelopes, including Dorcatragus (beira), Madoqua (dik dik), Neotragus, Oreotragus (klipspringer) and Raphicerus. In 1963, German mammalogist Theodor Haltenorth separated the oribi and Raphicerus into a new tribe, Raphicerini; later on, zoologist Jonathan Kingdon assigned the oribi to Ourebini, a tribe of its own. The common name "oribi" comes from the Afrikaans name for the animal, oorbietjie.

In a revision of the phylogeny of the tribe Antilopini on the basis of nuclear and mitochondrial data in 2013, Eva Verena Bärmann (of the University of Cambridge) and colleagues showed that the oribi is the sister taxon to all other antilopines. The cladogram below is based on the 2013 study.

- - - Oribi (Ourebia ourebi)
    - - Saiga (Saiga tatarica)
      - - - Gerenuk (Litocranius walleri)
          - Springbok (Antidorcas marsupialis)
        - - - Eudorcas
            - Nanger
          - - Gazella
            - Blackbuck (Antilope cervicapra)
  - - Procapra
    - - Raphicerus
      - - Madoqua
        - Dorcatragus

The following eight subspecies are identified:

- O. o. dorcas Schwarz, 1914
- O. o. gallarum Blaine, 1913
- O. o. haggardi (Thomas, 1895) – Occurs in eastern Africa. Listed as Vulnerable by the IUCN.
- O. o. hastata (Peters, 1852) – Ranges from Kenya southward into Mozambique and eastward into Angola
- † O. o. kenyae Meinhertzhagen, 1905 – Occurred on the lower slopes of Mount Kenya.
- O. o. montana (Cretzschmar, 1826) – Ranges from northern Nigeria eastward into Ethiopia and southward into Uganda.
- O. o. ourebi (Zimmermann, 1783) – Its range lies south of Zambezi River.
- O. o. quadriscopa (C. H. Smith, 1827) – Occurs in western Africa
- O. o. rutila Blaine, 1922

Of these, zoologists Colin Groves and Peter Grubb identify O. o. hastata, O. o. montana, O. o. ourebi and O. o. quadriscopa as independent species in their 2011 publication Ungulate Taxonomy.

== Description ==
The oribi is a small, slender antelope; it reaches nearly 50–67 centimetres (20–26 in) at the shoulder and weighs 12–22 kilograms (26–49 lb). The head-and-body length is typically between 92 and 110 centimetres (36 and 43 in). Sexually dimorphic, males are slightly smaller than females (except for O. o. ourebi, in which females are smaller). This antelope features a slightly raised back, and long neck and limbs. The glossy, yellowish to rufous brown coat contrasts with the white chin, throat, underparts and rump. The bushy tail, brown to black on the outside, has white insides (except in O. o. hastata, that has a completely black tail). The subspecies show some variation in colouration; O. o. ourebi is a rich rufous, while O. o. hastata is yellower.

Only males possess horns; the thin, straight horns, 8–18 centimetres (3.1–7.1 in) long, are smooth at the tips and ringed at the base. The maximum horn length, 19.1 centimetres (7.5 in), was recorded in 1998 from Malawi. The oribi has at least six different, well-developed scent glands (such as the prominent preorbital glands near the eyes). The body has several modifications, such as the large fossae below the eyes, to accommodate such a large number of glands. Females have four teats.

== Ecology and behaviour ==
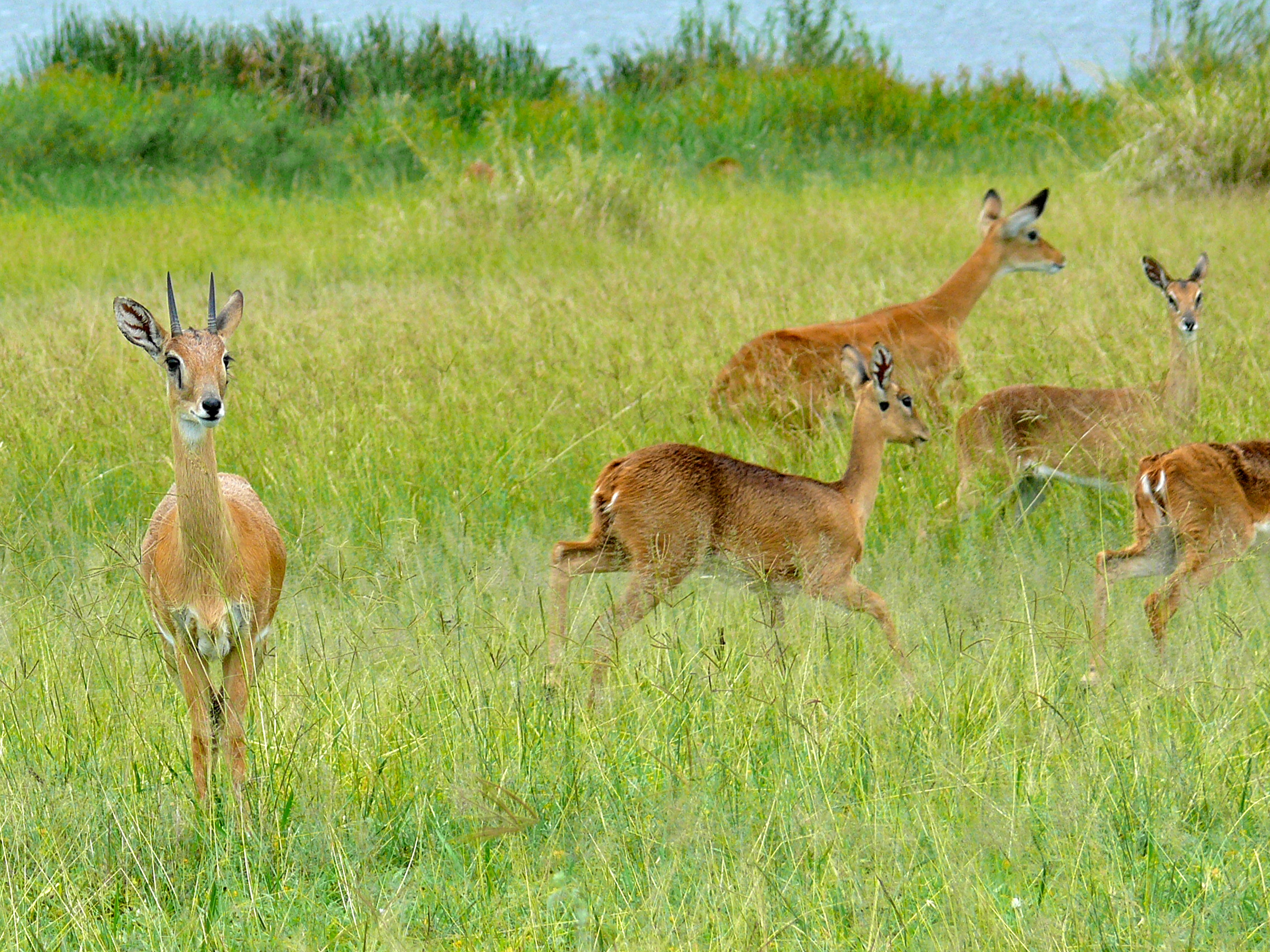
A male (left) and small group of females

The oribi is diurnal (active mainly during the day), though some activity may also be observed at night. It rests in cover during rain events. Unlike all other small antelopes, oribi can exhibit three types of mating systems, depending on the habitat – polyandry, polygyny and polygynandry; polygyny tends to prevail as the female-to-male ratio increases. A study suggested that polygyny is preferred in areas of high predator risk, as it leads to formation of groups as an anti-predator measure. Small herds of up to four members are also common.

Males defend their group's territory, 25–100 hectares (62–247 acres) large; female members may also show some aggression and drive away intruders. A study showed that the number of females that visit the male's territory depends on the appearance (particularly the symmetry) of the male's horns. Males mark vegetation and soil in their territories by preorbital gland secretions and excrement; the intensity of marking increases with the number of male neighbours. Dominant males tend to have greater access to females in and around the territory than other males. An important feature of the social behaviour of oribi is the "dung ceremony", in which all animals form temporary dung middens. Oribi at least three months old have been observed giving out one to three alarm whistles on sensing danger. These whistles are more common in adults than in juveniles, and males appear to whistle more. Common predators include carnivorans such as jackals.

=== Diet ===
Primarily a grazer, the oribi prefers fresh grasses and browses occasionally. Grasses can constitute up to 90% of the diet; preferred varieties include Andropogon, Eulalia, Hyparrhenia, Loudetia, Pennisetum and Themeda species. Mineral licks are also visited regularly. Oribi have been observed feeding on flowers and Boletus mushrooms. Groups of oribi congregate in the rainy season, when grasses are abundant.

=== Reproduction ===
Both sexes become sexually mature at 10 to 14 months. A seasonal breeder, the time when mating occurs varies geographically. Mating may peak in the rainy season (August to September). When a female enters oestrus (which lasts for four to six days), she seeks the company of males. During courtship, the male will pursue the female, test her urine to check if she is in oestrus and lick her rump and flanks. Gestation lasts for six to seven months, following which a single calf is born; births peak from November to December in southern Africa. The newborn is kept in concealment for nearly a month; the mother pays regular visits to her calf to suckle it for nearly half an hour. Males may guard their offspring from predators and keep away other males. Weaning takes place at four to five months. The oribi lives for 8 to 12 years in the wild, and for 12 to 14 years in captivity.

== Distribution and habitat ==
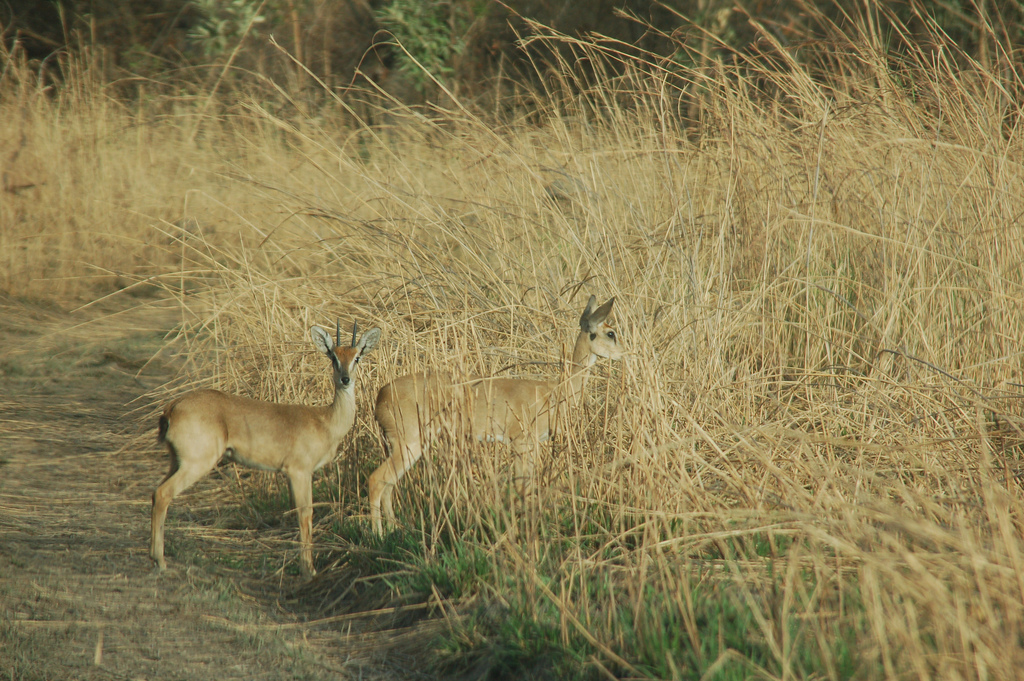
Oribi occur in tropical grasslands at W National Park, Niger

The oribi occurs in a variety of habitats – from savannahs, floodplains and tropical grasslands with 10–100 centimetres (3.9–39.4 in) tall grasses to montane grasslands at low altitudes, up to 2,000 metres (6,600 ft) above the sea level. Recently burnt areas often attract groups of oribi. The choice of habitat depends on the availability of cover needed to escape the eyes of predators. Population densities typically vary between 2 and 10 individuals per km^{2}; however, densities as high as 45 individuals per km^{2} have been recorded in tropical grasslands that receive over 110 centimetres (43 in) of annual rainfall and open floodplains. The oribi's range overlaps with those of larger grazers such as the African buffalo, hippopotamus, hartebeest, Thomson's gazelle and topi. These separate species often occur in close proximity to each other, increasing predator vigilance.

This antelope is highly sporadic in distribution; it occurs mainly in eastern, southern and western Africa, ranging from Nigeria and Senegal in the west to Ethiopia and Eritrea in the east and southward to Angola and the Eastern Cape (South Africa). It is feared to be extinct in Burundi.

== Threats and conservation ==
The oribi has been classified as Least Concern by the IUCN. The total population (as of 2008) is estimated at 750,000. However, the subspecies O. o. haggardi is listed as Vulnerable because, as of 2008, the total population is estimated at less than 10,000 mature individuals, and is feared to be declining. Hunting is a relatively minor threat, since the oribi shows some tolerance to hunting. Nevertheless, the steep fall of 92% in oribi populations in Comoé National Park (Côte d'Ivoire) has been attributed to poaching. Numbers have also declined due to agricultural expansion and competition from livestock.

The oribi occurs in a number of protected areas throughout its range, such as: Gashaka Gumti National Park in Nigeria, the Pendjari and W National Parks (Benin); Aouk Hunting Zone (Chad); Benoue, Bouba Njida and Faro National Parks (Cameroon); Manovo-Gounda St. Floris National Park (Central African Republic); Garamba, Upemba and Kundelungu National Parks (Congo-Kinshasa); Omo National Park (Ethiopia); Masai Mara Game Reserve and Ruma National Park (Kenya); Golden Gate Highlands National Park (South Africa); Serengeti National Park (Tanzania); Kidepo Valley, Lake Mburo and Murchison Falls National Parks (Uganda); Kafue and Liuwa Plain National Parks and Bangweulu Swamp (Zambia).
