= Georg Eiffinger =

German entomologist

Georg Eiffinger (1838 -1920) was a German entomologist who specialised in the Lepidoptera genus Erebia.He lived in Frankfurt am Main where he was associated with Naturmuseum Senckenberg.He is honoured by the name Kurixalus eiffingeri, a tree frog named by Oskar Boettger.

== Publications ==
Eiffinger, G. 1907. Die palaearctica Tagfalter. Erebia. in: Seitz, A. [Ed] Die Groβ-schmetterlinge der Erde. I. Abteilung: Die Großschmetterlinge des Palaearktischen Faunengebietes. 1. Band: Die Palaearktischen Tagfalter. Lehmann, Stuttgart. 94–114.
