= Adalbert Seitz =

German entomologist (1860–1938)

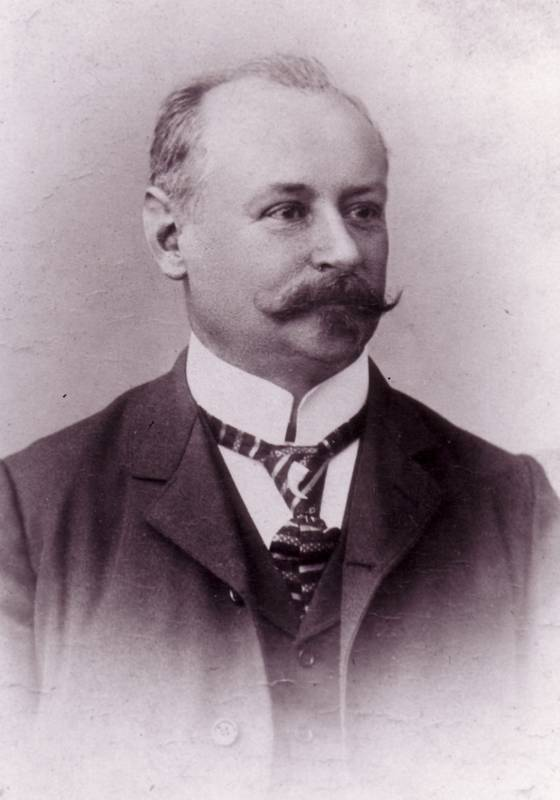
Adalbert Seitz

Friedrich Joseph Adalbert Seitz (24 February 1860 in Mainz – 5 March 1938 in Darmstadt) was a German physician and entomologist who specialised in Lepidoptera. He was a director of the Frankfurt zoo from 1893 to 1908 and is best known for editing the multivolume reference on the butterflies and larger moths of the world Die Gross-Schmetterlinge der Erde which continued after his death.

== Biography ==
Seitz was born in Mainz and went to school in Aschaffenburg, Darmstadt and Bensheim. He studied medicine from 1880 to 1885 and then zoology at Giessen. His doctorate was on the protective devices of animals. He worked as an assistant in the maternity hospital of the University of Giessen and then worked as a ship's doctor from 1887, travelling to Australia, South America and Asia. He began to collect butterflies on these travels.

In 1891 he habilitated in zoology with a thesis on the biology of butterflies from the University of Giessen. In 1893 he took up a position as a director of the Frankfurt Zoo. During the fifteen years of his service the zoo population of animals went from 1,111 to 3,000 and he brought in many new species. The animal dealer Josef Menges used the zoo as a holding depot for animals that came from other parts of the world, and this made the place very popular. Seitz designed a small mammal gallery and a special reptile house. He also created the first insectarium. Despite his interest and success, he retired in 1908 to work on the manual of the butterflies of the world.

Seitz moved to Darmstadt and invested much of his pension to aid zoo staff and then supported himself as the curator of the Senckenberg Museum, to which he donated his own butterfly collections. The idea for the book was first born in 1887 after meeting William John Macleay. Die Gross-Schmetterlinge der Erde (The Macrolepidoptera of the World) consisted of sixteen volumes with four supplements published in German, French, and English. For details see Griffin, F. J. (1936). The first four volumes describe the Palaearctic fauna and volumes 5–16 describe the exotic Fauna (Volumes 1–4, Palaearctic Fauna, with 4 supplements; Volumes 5–8, American Fauna; Volumes 9–12, Indo-Australian Fauna; Volumes 13–16, African Fauna). The coloured plates were made by 10–14 colour lithography. Seitz planned to finish the whole work in 1912, but this proved to be quite unrealistic and publication stopped in 1954. Several volumes remain unfinished.

Plate from Macrolepidoptera of the World.

Consulted collections of butterflies include those of Walter Rothschild, the British Museum, the Muséum national d'histoire naturelle, Paris, the Senckenberg Museum at Frankfurt, as well as collections in Tokyo, Hong-Kong, Australia, South America, and North America. Seitz's private collection is conserved in Forschungsinstitut und Naturmuseum Senckenberg.

== Die Großschmetterlinge der Erde, Verlag Alfred Kernen, Stuttgart ==
"The idea of a work for the identification of all the known Macrolepidoptera originated during an excursion which the editor made in Australia in the company of the late William McLeay. The suggestion put forward by this naturalist found further support in the following year in a consultation with Emilio A. Goeldi, the then director of the Zoological Museum at Rio de Janeiro, which induced me to enter into communication with Dr. O. Staudinger in order to confer with him about the feasibility of an extension, suiting the requirements of all collectors in foreign countries, of his work on Exotic Lepidoptera, which was in the course of publication.

But the imperfect technique and the absence of certain indispensable preliminary studies appeared to render it impossible at the time to carry out the plan. Nevertheless I commenced to work with a view towards a future realization of the idea. It seemed to me above all necessary to visit every faunistic region and subregion, as far as it might be possible, and consequently after leaving Australia in November 1887 and having collected in South America, especially Brazil (1888-89), I went to India and China (1890), visited Japan (1891-92) and Anterior India (1892) and finally collected on several tours in Africa. I paid also special attention to the fauna of islands and made collections on the Cape Verde Islands, the Canaries, Madeira, Kangaroo Island, and various islands of the Indian and Chinese seas."

Preface
Band 1: Abt. 1, Die Großschmetterlinge des palaearktischen Faunengebietes, Die palaearktischen Tagfalter, 1909, 379 Seiten, mit 89 kolorierten Tafeln (3470 Figuren)
Band 2: Abt. 1, Die Großschmetterlinge des palaearktischen Faunengebietes, Die palaearktischen Spinner und Schwärmer, 1912–1913
Band 3: Abt. 1, Die Großschmetterlinge des palaearktischen Faunengebietes, Die palaearktischen eulenartigen Nachtfalter, 1914
Band 4: Abt. 1, Die Großschmetterlinge des palaearktischen Faunengebietes, Die spannerartigen Nachtfalter, 1915
Band 5: Abt. 2, Die exotischen Großschmetterlinge, Die Großschmetterlinge des amerikanischen Faunengebietes, 1907
Band 6: Abt. 2, Die exotischen Großschmetterlinge, Die amerikanischen Spinner und Schwärmer, 1940, 1327 Seiten, 198 Tafeln
Band 7: Abt. 2, Die exotischen Großschmetterlinge, Eulenartige Nachtfalter, 1923, 508 Seiten, 87 Tafeln
Band 8: Abt. 2, Die exotischen Großschmetterlinge, Die amerikanischen Spanner, 1907, 144 Seiten, 16 Tafeln
Band 9: Abt. 2, Die exotischen Großschmetterlinge, Die indo-australischen Tagfalter, 1927, 1197 Seiten 177 Tafeln
Band 10: Abt. 2, Die exotischen Großschmetterlinge, Die indo-australischen Spinner und Schwärmer, 1933, 847 Seiten, 104 Tafeln
Band 11: Abt. 2, Die exotischen Großschmetterlinge, Die indo-australischen eulenartigen Nachtfalter, 1924, 1141 Seiten, 203 Tafeln
Band 12: Abt. 2, Die exotischen Großschmetterlinge, Die indo-australischen Geometridae
Band 13: Abt. 2, Die exotischen Großschmetterlinge, Die afrikanischen Tagfalter, 1925, 613 Seiten, 80 Tafeln
Band 14: Abt. 2, Die exotischen Großschmetterlinge, Die afrikanischen Spinner und Schwärmer, 1925–1930, 80 Tafeln
Band 15: Abt. 2, Die exotischen Großschmetterlinge, Die afrikanischen eulenartigen Nachtfalter, 286 Seiten, 41 Tafeln
Band 16: Abt. 2, Die exotischen Großschmetterlinge, Die afrikanischen spannerartigen Nachtfalter, 1929, 160 Seiten, 18 Tafeln
Band 1, Supplement: Die palaearktischen Tagfalter,
Band 2, Supplement: Die palaearktischen Spinner und Schwärmer
Band 3, Supplement: Die palaearktischen eulenartigen Nachtfalter
Band 4, Supplement: Die spannerartigen Nachtfalter

Authors contributing to The Macrolepidoptera of the World include Adalbert Seitz himself, Karl Jordan, Julius Röber, William Warren, Per Olof Christopher Aurivillius, Louis Beethoven Prout, Hans Fruhstorfer, Max Gaede, Thomas Lehmann, Richard Haensch, Gustav Weymer, Max Wilhelm Karl Draudt, Hans Stichel, Jules Paul Mabille, Max Bartel, Erich Martin Hering, Embrik Strand, Karl Grünberg, William Schaus, Walter Rothschild, Georg Eiffinger.

== Sources ==
- Francis J. Griffin (1936) The contents of the parts and the dates of appearance of Seitz' Grossschmetterlinge der Erde (The Macro-Lepidoptera of the world), Lieferungen 1 to 130 Palearctic and 1 to 575 exotic. Vols. 1 to 16, 1907–1935. Transactions of the Royal Entomological Society of London 85(10):243–279 doi:10.1111/j.1365-2311.1936.tb00232.x
- Turati, E. 1938: [Seitz, A.] Boll. Soc. geogr. ital. 70: 94.
- Tuxen, S. L. 1938: [Seitz, A.] Ent. Meddel. 20: 187.
