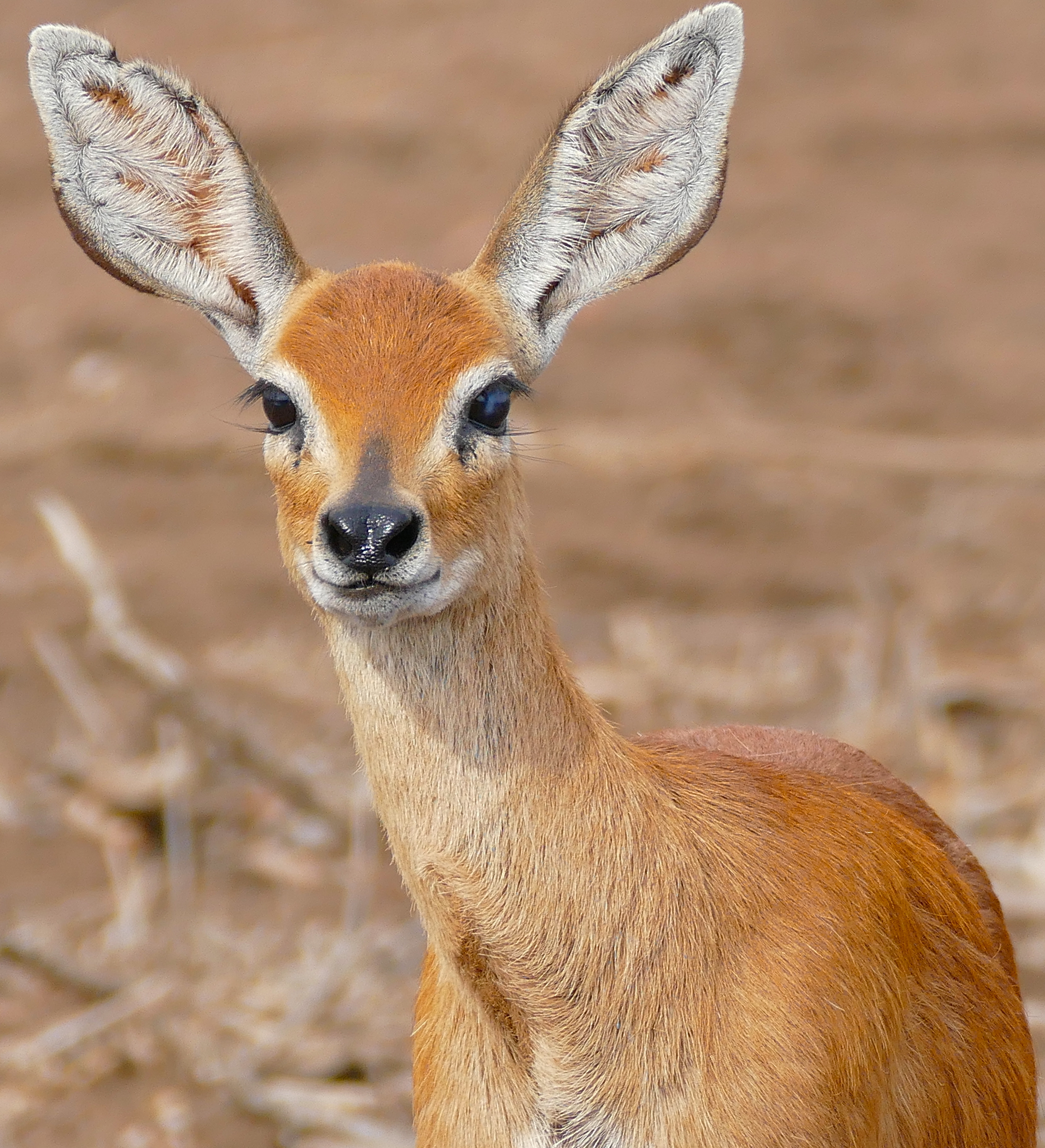
- Female steenbok

Scientific classification
- Domain: Eukaryota
- Kingdom: Animalia
- Phylum: Chordata
- Class: Mammalia
- Order: Artiodactyla
- Family: Bovidae
- Subfamily: Antilopinae
- Tribe: Neotragini
- Genus: Raphicerus; H. Smith, 1827

Type species
- Cerophorus acuticornis de Blainville, 1816

Species
- Raphicerus melanotis; Raphicerus sharpei; Raphicerus campestris

Synonyms
- Rhaphiceros Lydekker, 1897

= Raphicerus =

Genus of mammals

Raphicerus is a genus of small antelopes of the tribe Neotragini (subfamily Antilopinae).

Raphicerus is endemic to sub-Saharan Africa, ranging from Kenya in the north to the Western Cape in South Africa.

The genus contains three species:

- Cape or southern grysbok R. melanotis
- Sharpe's or northern grysbok R. sharpei
- Steenbok R. campestris
