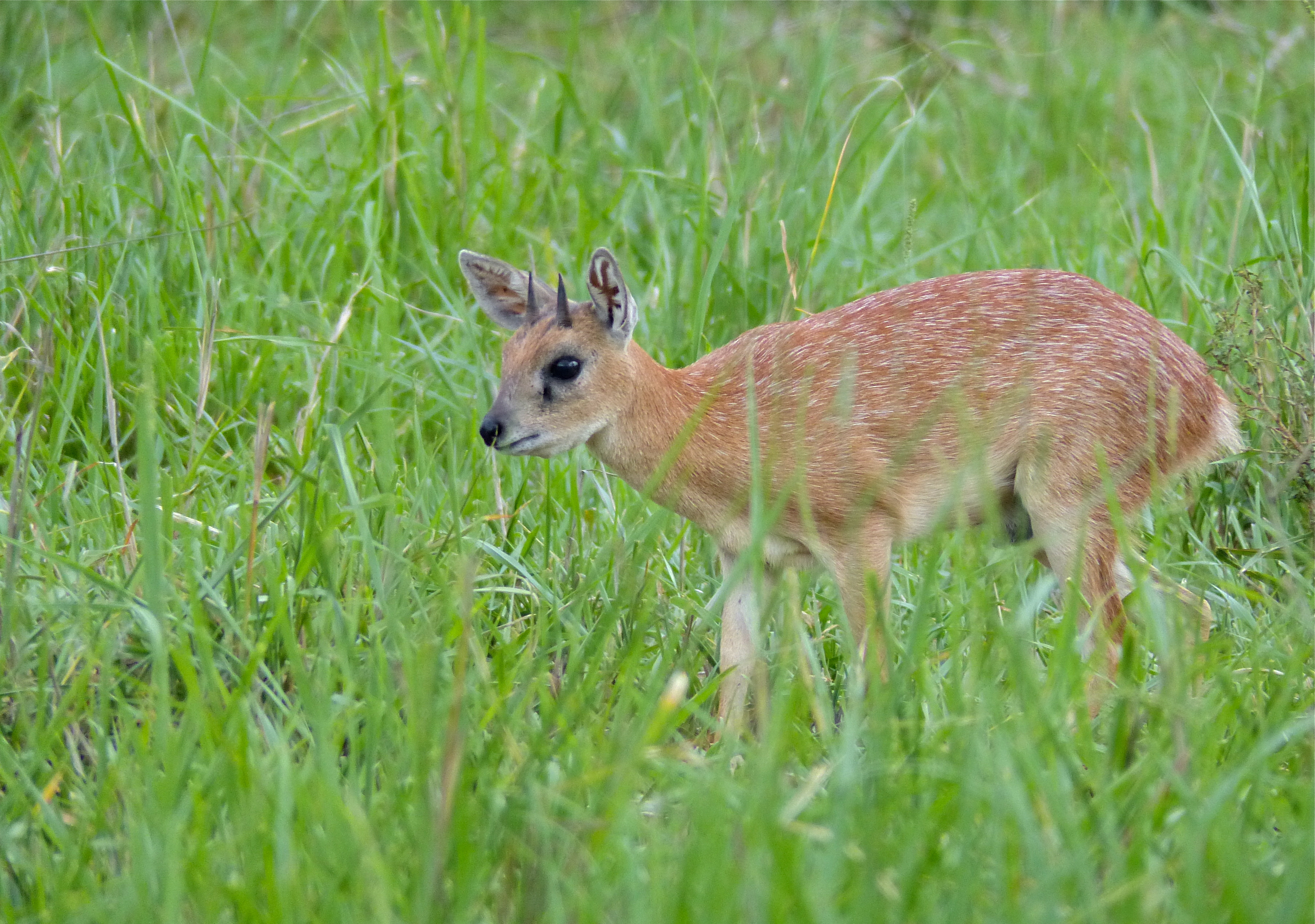

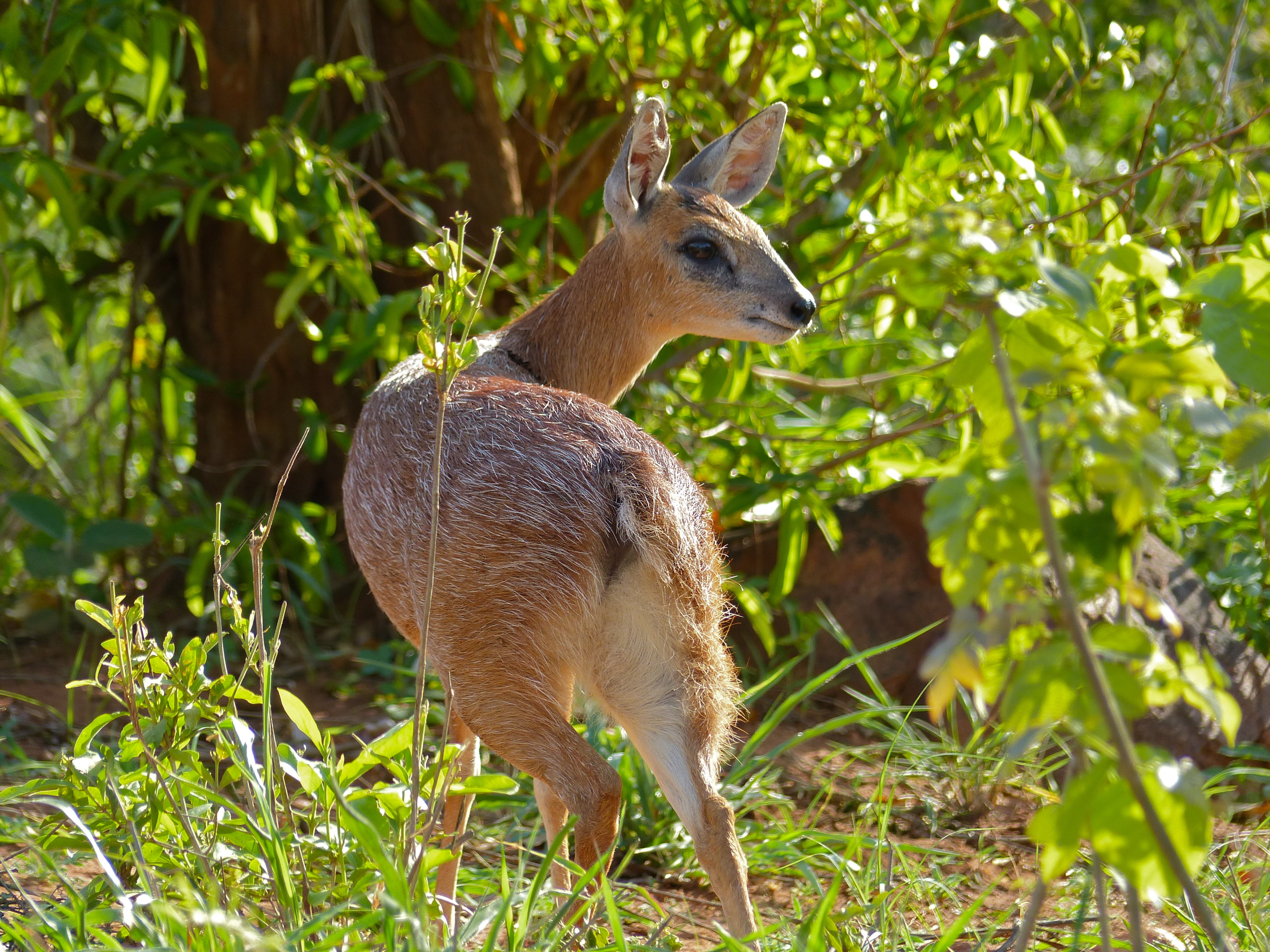
- Male and female in the Kruger National Park

Conservation status
- Least Concern (IUCN 3.1)

Scientific classification
- Kingdom: Animalia
- Phylum: Chordata
- Class: Mammalia
- Order: Artiodactyla
- Family: Bovidae
- Subfamily: Antilopinae
- Genus: Raphicerus
- Species: R. sharpei

Binomial name
- Raphicerus sharpei Thomas, 1897
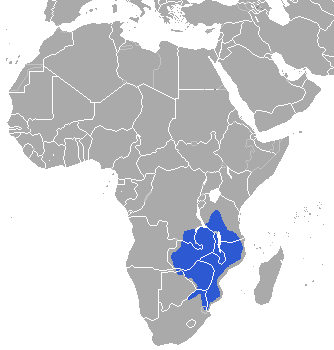
- native range

= Sharpe's grysbok =

Species of mammal

Sharpe's or northern grysbok (Raphicerus sharpei) is a small, shy, solitary antelope that is found from tropical to south-eastern Africa.

== Range ==
They are found in the Transvaal (South Africa), the Caprivi Strip (Namibia), Botswana, Mozambique, Zimbabwe, Zambia, Malawi and Tanzania to Lake Victoria.

== Description ==
It is similar in size to the gray duiker, but has a stockier body and shaggy fur over the hindquarters. It stands about 20" (45–60 cm) at the shoulders and weighs only 7–11.5 kg. Its coat is reddish-brown streaked with white; eye-rings, muzzle, throat and underside are off-white. The males have stubby horns, which are widely spaced. Sharpe's grysbok has a short, deep muzzle with large mouth and heavy molars for grinding. The short neck and head on a long-legged body result in a high-rumped posture when browsing.

== Habits ==
Although widespread, Sharpe's grysbok is infrequently seen. Males and females seem to form brief associations, but the species is usually encountered singly. Territory is marked with dung middens. Their habitat is rocky hill country, but preferring fertile zones on the lower slopes. They are nocturnal browsers and spend the day in the protective cover of tall grass or shrubs. They are extremely timid and will run away at the first sign of anything unusual, although this flight is accompanied "short stamping hops"; they move well away from where the disturbance occurred before stopping (unlike steenbok, which stop and look back). Sharpe's Grysbok are reported to take refuge in aardvark burrows, like steenbok.

Sharpe's grysbok browse on leaves, buds, herb and fruits—in the dry season, their food is typically tough (for which their teeth and jaws are adapted). Grazed grass makes up about 30% of their diet. Like the Cape grysbok they use a communal latrine and mark sticks in its vicinity with pre-orbital gland secretions.

== Taxonomy ==
The closely related Cape (or southern) grysbok (R. melanotis) occurs in the western Cape region. In the 1980s, Haltenorth and Diller considered R. sharpei as a subspecies of R. melanotis, but it is now known to be more closely related to the steenbok.
