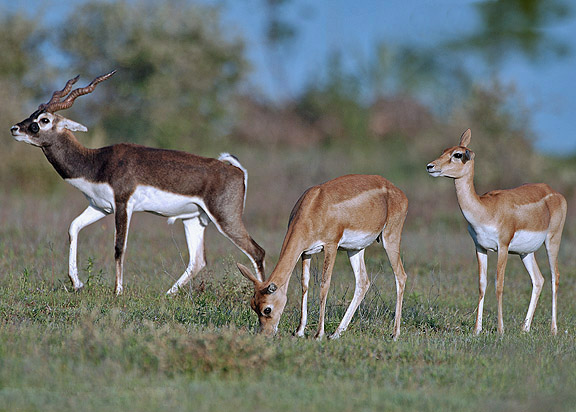
- Blackbuck antelope of India

Scientific classification
- Kingdom: Animalia
- Phylum: Chordata
- Class: Mammalia
- Order: Artiodactyla
- Superfamily: Bovoidea
- Family: Bovidae

Groups included
- Aepycerotini; Alcelaphini; Antilopini; Boselaphini; Cephalophini; Hippotragini; Nesotragini; Oreotragini; Pantholopini; Reduncini; Tragelaphini; Neotragini

Cladistically included but traditionally excluded taxa
- Bovini; Caprini; Ovibovini

= Antelope =

Group of even-toed ruminants

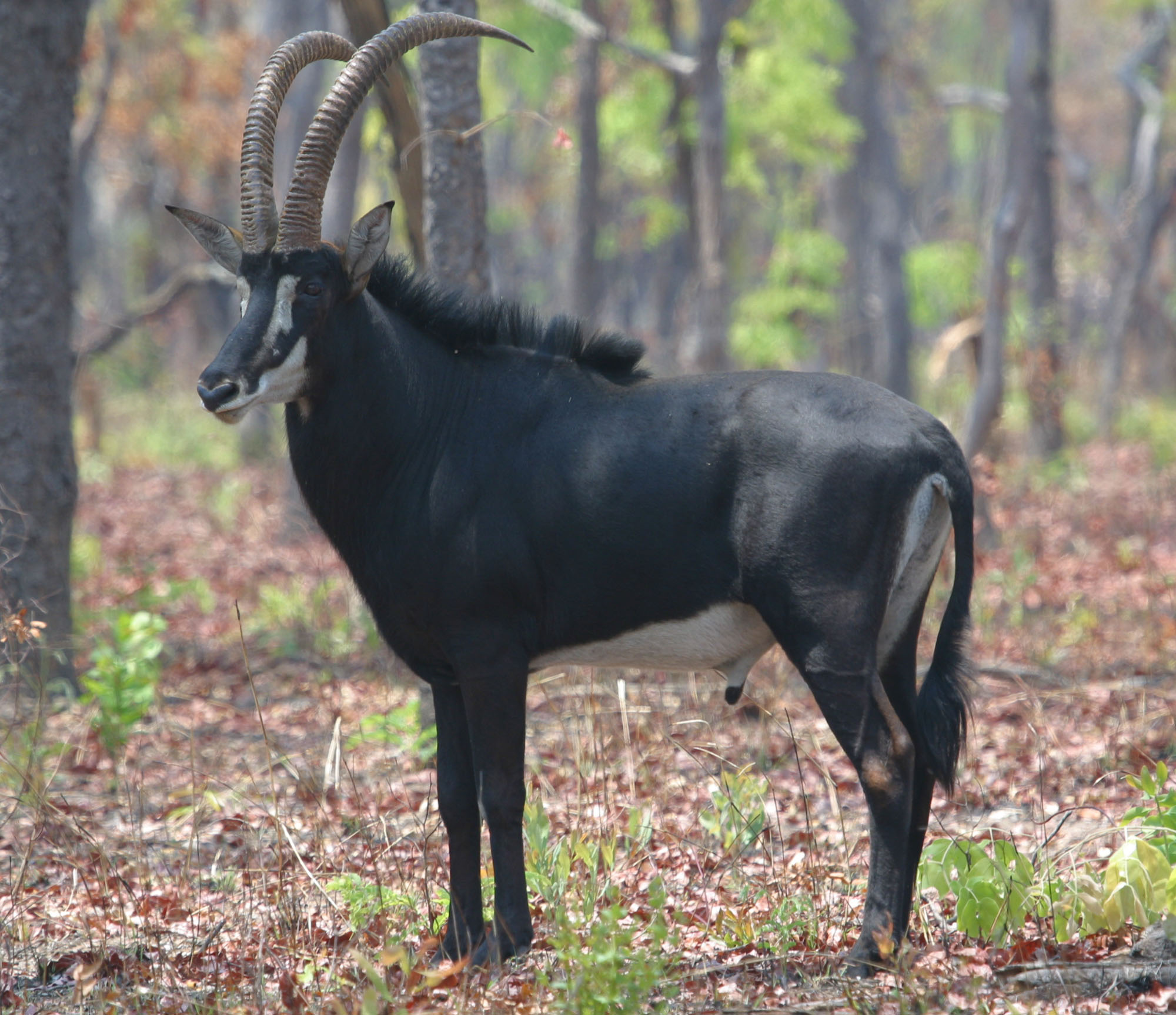
A bull sable antelope among the trees in the African savanna

An antelope is any of the extant or recently extinct species of the ruminant artiodactyl family Bovidae, which are indigenous to most of Africa, India, the Middle East, Central Asia, and a small area of Russia. Antelopes do not form a monophyletic group, as some antelopes are more closely related to other bovid groups, such as bovines, goats, and sheep, than to other antelopes.

A stricter grouping, known as the true antelopes, includes only the genera Gazella, Nanger, Eudorcas, and Antilope. One North American mammal, the pronghorn or "pronghorn antelope", is colloquially referred to as the "American antelope", despite the fact that it belongs to a different family (Antilocapridae) than the true Old-World antelopes; pronghorn are the sole extant member of a lineage that once included many species which went extinct in the prehistoric period.

Although antelopes are sometimes misidentified as "deer" (cervids), the groups are only distantly related. While antelopes are found in abundance in Africa, there is only one living African deer species: the Barbary stag of North Africa. By comparison, numerous deer species are found in regions of the world with few or no antelope species present, such as throughout Southeast Asia, Europe and all of the Americas. This is likely due to competition over shared resources, as deer and antelope fill a virtually identical ecological niche in their respective habitats. Countries like India, however, have large populations of endemic deer and antelope, with the different species generally keeping to their own "niches" with minimal overlap.

Unlike deer, in which males of most species sport bone antlers that are shed and regrown annually, antelope horns are bone encased in keratin and grow steadily, never falling off. If a horn is broken, it will either remain broken or take years to partially regenerate, depending on the species.

== Etymology ==
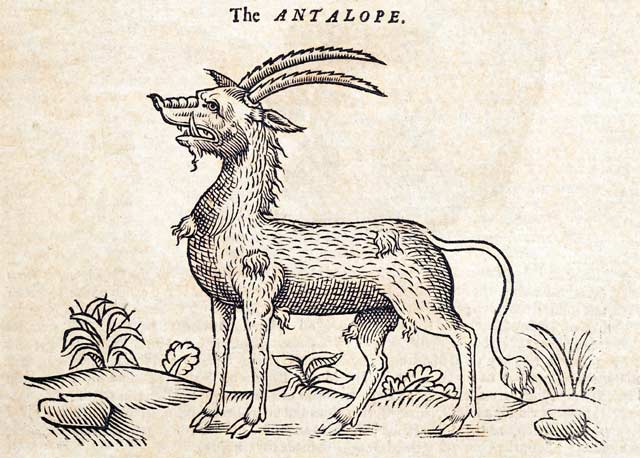
Illustration from The History of Four-footed Beasts (1607)

The English word "antelope" first appeared in 1417 and is derived from the Old French antelop, itself derived from Medieval Latin ant(h)alopus, which in turn comes from the Byzantine Greek word ἀνθόλοψ, anthólops, first attested in Eustathius of Antioch (c. 336), according to whom it was a fabulous animal "haunting the banks of the Euphrates, very savage, hard to catch and having long, saw-like horns capable of cutting down trees". It has been suggested that this derives from Greek ἀνθος, anthos (flower) and ώψ, ops (eye), perhaps meaning "beautiful eye" or alluding to the animals' long eyelashes. This, however, may be a folk etymology in Greek based on some earlier root. The word talopus and calopus, from Latin, came to be used in heraldry. In 1607, it was first used for living, cervine animals.

== Species ==
There are 91 antelope species, most of which are native to Africa, in about 30 genera. The classification of tribes or subfamilies within Bovoidea is still a matter of debate, with several alternative systems proposed.

Antelope are not a cladistic or taxonomically defined group. The term is used to describe all members of the family Bovidae that do not fall under the category of sheep, cattle, or goats. Usually, all species of the Antilopinae, Hippotraginae, Reduncinae, Cephalophinae, many Bovinae, the grey rhebok, and the impala are called antelope.

== Distribution and habitat ==
More species of antelope are native to Africa than to any other continent, almost exclusively in savannahs, with 25-40 species co-occurring over much of East Africa. Because savannah habitat in Africa has expanded and contracted five times over the last three million years, and the fossil record indicates this is when most extant species evolved, it is believed that isolation in refugia during contractions was a major driver of this diversification. Other species occur in Asia: the Arabian Peninsula is home to the Arabian oryx and Dorcas gazelle. South Asia is home to the nilgai, chinkara, blackbuck, Tibetan antelope, and four-horned antelope, while Russia and Central Asia have the Tibetan antelope and saiga.

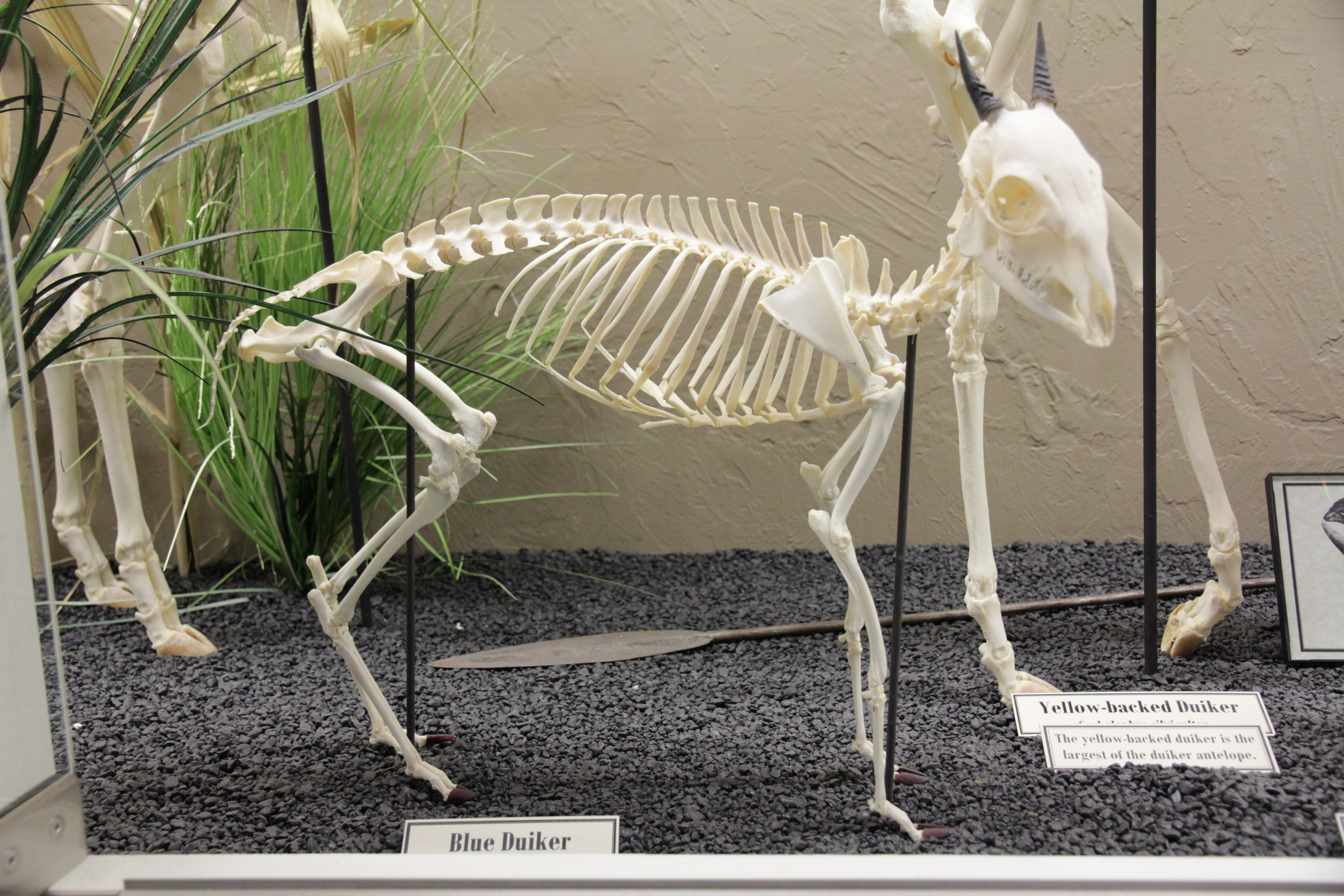
Blue duiker (Philantomba monticola) skeleton on display at the Museum of Osteology

No antelope species is native to Australasia or Antarctica, nor do any extant species occur in the Americas, though the nominate saiga subspecies occurred in North America during the Pleistocene. North America is currently home to the native pronghorn, which taxonomists do not consider a member of the antelope group, but which is often locally referred to as such (e.g., "American antelope"). In Europe, several extinct species occur in the fossil record, and the saiga was found widely during the Pleistocene but did not persist into the later Holocene, except in Russian Kalmykia and Astrakhan Oblast.

Many species of antelope have been imported to other parts of the world, especially the United States, for exotic game hunting. With some species possessing spectacular leaping and evasive skills, individuals may escape. Texas in particular has many game ranches, as well as habitats and climates that are very hospitable to African and Asian plains antelope species. Accordingly, wild populations of blackbuck antelope, gemsbok, and nilgai may be found in Texas.

Antelope live in a wide range of habitats. Most live in the African savannahs. However, many species are more secluded, such as the forest antelope, as well as the extreme cold-living saiga, the desert-adapted Arabian oryx, the rocky koppie-living klipspringer, and semiaquatic sitatunga.

Species living in forests, woodland, or bush tend to be sedentary, but many of the plains species undertake long migrations. These enable grass-eating species to follow the rains and thereby their food supply. The gnus and gazelles of East Africa perform some of the largest mass migratory circuits of all mammals.

== Morphology ==
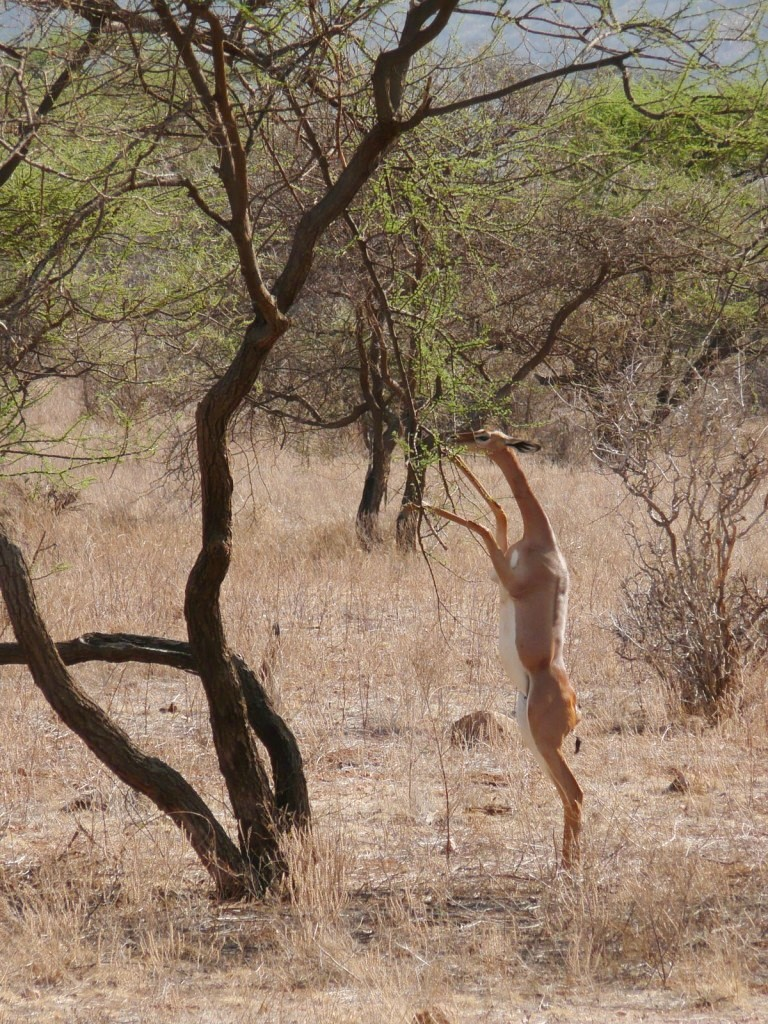
Gerenuks can stand erect on their hind legs to browse on high foliage

=== Body and covering ===
Antelope vary greatly in size. For example, a male common eland can measure 178 cm (5 ft 10 in) at the shoulder and weigh almost 950 kg (2,100 lb), whereas an adult royal antelope may stand only 24 cm (9 1/2 in) at the shoulder and weigh a mere 1.5 kg (3 1/4 lb).

Antelope have a wide variety of coverings, though most have a dense coat of short fur. In most species, the coat (pelage) is some variation of a brown colour (or several shades of brown), often with white or pale underbodies. Exceptions include the zebra-marked zebra duiker, the grey, black, and white Jentink's duiker, and the black lechwe. Most of the "spiral-horned" antelope have pale, vertical stripes on their backs. Many desert and semidesert species are particularly pale, some almost silvery or whitish (e.g. Arabian oryx); the beisa and southern oryxes have gray and black pelages with vivid black-and-white faces. Common features of various gazelles are white rumps, which flash a warning to others when they run from danger, and dark stripes midbody (the latter feature is also shared by the springbok and beira). The springbok also has a pouch of white, brushlike hairs running along its back, which opens up when the animal senses danger, causing the dorsal hairs to stand on end.

Many antelope are sexually dimorphic. In most species, both sexes have horns, but those of males tend to be larger. Males tend to be larger than the females, but exceptions in which the females tend to be heavier than the males include the bush duiker, dwarf antelope, Cape grysbok, and oribi, all rather small species. A number of species have hornless females (e.g., sitatunga, red lechwe, and suni). In some species, the males and females have differently coloured pelages (e.g. blackbuck and nyala).

Many wild antelopes are characterized by high running and jumping abilities. Their main defence against predators is to try to escape.

Species such as black wildebeest, springbok, blesbok, mountain reedbuck, greater kudu as well the European fallow deer have high concentrations of glycolitic fast twitch type IIx muscle fibers; smaller species naturally have higher concentrations of type IIx fibers than larger species. Although their concentration of type IIx fibers is still lower than that of the wild cheetah, other running-adapted mammal; wild cheetah vastus lateralis muscle have a concentration of 76% of type IIx fibers, compared to 58% of springbok, 57% of mountain reedbuck, 55% of blesbok, 48% of European fallow deer, 43% of greater kudu and 30% black wildebeest. The concentration of type IIx muscle fibers in human vastus lateralis muscle is 7%.

The activity of the anaerobic enzyme LDH, an indicator of a principally anaerobic muscle metabolism, is around 4 times more higher than that of humans, a level of activity comparable to that of the lion, but lower than that of the wild caracal and especially that of the wild cheetah; LDH activity is 6 times higher than that of the humans in caracal and 9 times higher in the wild cheetah.

Activity of aerobic enzymes CS and 3HAD is higher than that of the felids in general and is comparable to that of human endurance runners. This indicates muscles capable of both high speed and high endurance.

Impala muscles, on the other hand, have a high concentrations of oxidative-glycolitic fast twitch type IIa muscle fibers.

Impala have a CS level activity comparable to that of the human endurance runners and their muscle metabolism appears to be principally aerobic, indicating muscles capable of high endurance.

In the impala, hindlimbs muscles form 17.5% of their body mass while forelimbs muscles form 11.3%. Compared to the reindeer in which hind and forelimb muscles form 14.8% and 10.9% of their body mass, respectively.

Antelopes tend to have very long limbs for their body masses; a 60 kg Peter's gazelle have a shoulder height of 90 cm, whereas a cheetah and a leopard of the same body mass have a shoulder height of 79 cm and 64 cm, respectively. Pronghorns and Old World antelopes have greater elongation and weight reduction in the distal parts of their limbs (Forearms, shins, front and hind feet), than the cheetah, the fastest land animal, indicating that longer limbs with more elongated and lighter distal parts are not as necessary for reaching the highest speeds for short periods of time, but are more necessary for maintaining higher speeds for longer periods of time.

A maximum running speed of 63.7 km/h for the impala and 54 km/h for the blue wildebeest has been estimated by GPS-IMU collars. A top speed of 65.2 km/h is obtained by calculating the distance and time it takes a Thomson's gazelle to escape from an approaching human. Film analysis of lion hunts gives maximum speeds of 90–97 km/h for the Thomson's gazelle. By speedometer reading when an animal runs alongside a car on a straight course, a maximum speed of up to 70 km/h has been estimated for the eland and the topi, and up to 80 km/h for the hartebeest, blue wildebeest, Grant's gazelle and Thomson's gazelle. By speedometer reading when an animal runs alongside a car, a maximum speed of 97 km/h has been estimated for the goitered gazelle. The saiga antelope has been clocked at 80 km/h when running alongside a motorcycle. Pronghorns are capable of running as fast as Old World antelopes, reaching speeds of 80 km/h commonly, and 97 km/h in favourable conditions such as running on flat dry lake beds. The speeds of the pronghorn were determined by reading the speedometer when the animals ran parallel to a moving vehicle.

Red forest duikers can jump cleanly over fences 1.6 m high, an impressive feat considering their shoulder height of 30 cm. Impalas can jump highs of 2.4 m (8 ft). Common elands can jump cleanly over 2.7 m fences.

Female Thomson's gazelles have been reported to be faster and more agile than males. This is in line with the fact that female springboks, another antilopine, have higher concentrations of type IIx fibres and thus probably a higher amount of muscle glycogen than males. Meanwhile, the concentration of muscle glycogen in cheetahs is very similar between males and females.

Even if they don't have horns, antelopes can be dangerous prey due to its sharp hooves. An incident has been reported in which a female cheetah sustained a serious injury to her abdomen reaching its femoral artery, from the sharp hooves of a hornless female common duiker, despite having killed the latter. The cheetah died of blood loss and peritonitis despite receiving veterinary treatment.

=== Sensory and digestive systems ===
Antelope are ruminants, so they have well-developed molar teeth, which grind cud (food balls stored in the stomach) into a pulp for further digestion. They have no upper incisors, but rather a hard upper gum pad, against which their lower incisors bite to tear grass stems and leaves.

Like many other herbivores, antelope rely on keen senses to avoid predators. Their eyes are placed on the sides of their heads, giving them a broad radius of vision with minimal binocular vision. Their horizontally elongated pupils also help in this respect. Acute senses of smell and hearing give antelope the ability to perceive danger at night out in the open (when predators are often on the prowl). These same senses play an important role in contact between individuals of the same species; markings on their heads, ears, legs, and rumps are used in such communication. Many species "flash" such markings, as well as their tails; vocal communications include loud barks, whistles, "moos", and trumpeting; many species also use scent marking to define their territories or simply to maintain contact with their relatives and neighbors.

=== Antelope horns ===
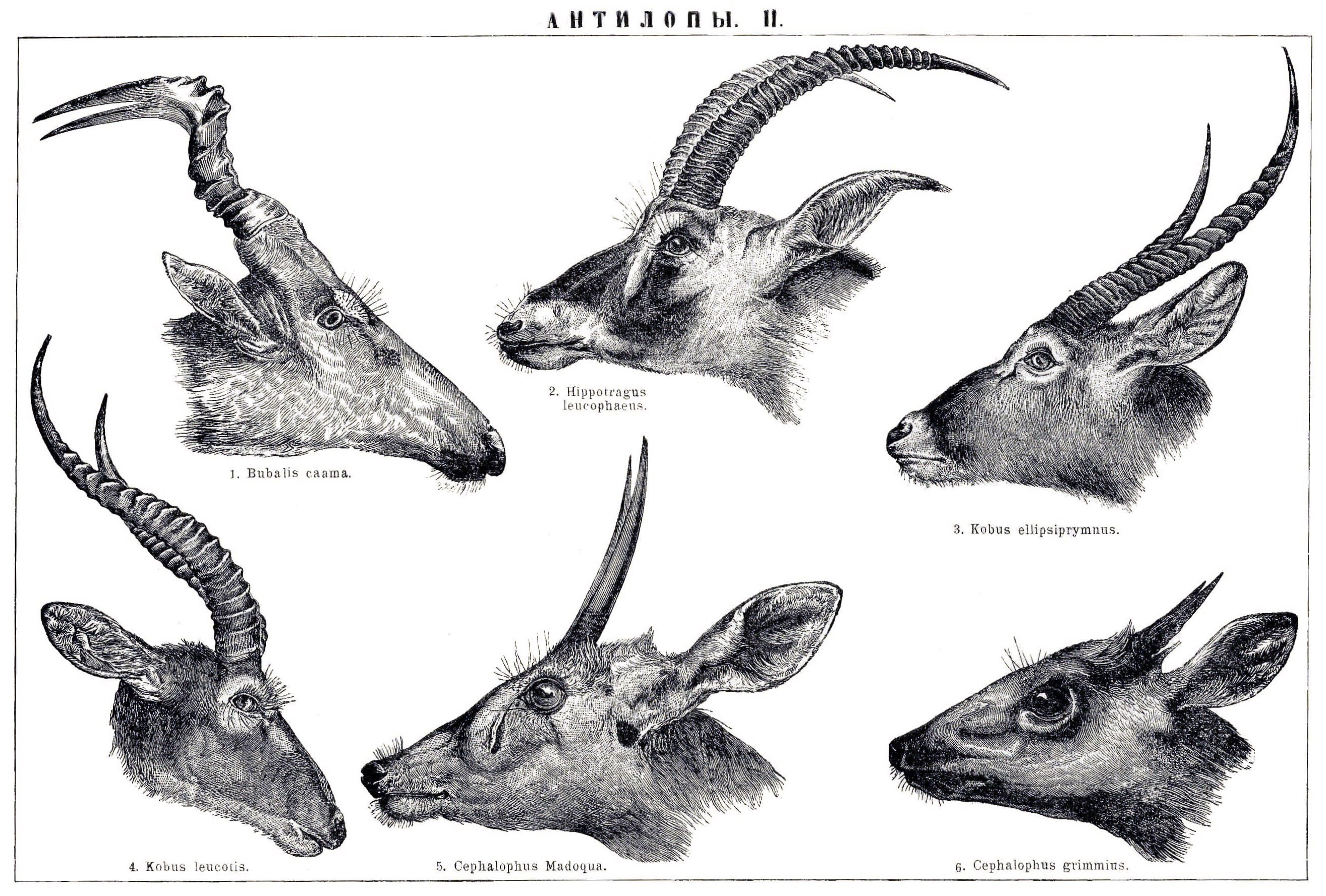
Antelope horns, from top left to bottom right: red hartebeest, roan antelope, waterbuck, white-eared kob, Salt’s dik-dik, common duiker

The size and shape of antelope horns varies greatly. Those of the duikers and dwarf antelope tend to be simple "spikes", but differ in the angle to the head from backward curved and backward pointing (e.g. yellow-backed duiker) to straight and upright (e.g. steenbok). Other groups have twisted (e.g. common eland), spiral (e.g. greater kudu), "recurved" (e.g. the reedbucks), lyrate (e.g. impala), or long, curved (e.g. the oryxes) horns. Horns are not shed and their bony cores are covered with a thick, persistent sheath of horny material, both of which distinguish them from antlers.

Antelope horns are effective stabbing weapons against predators (Although there is a risk that the long horns getting stuck in the predator's body), and tend to be better developed in those species where males fight over females (large herd antelope) than in solitary or lekking species. With male-male competition for mates, horns are clashed in combat. Males more commonly use their horns against each other than against another species. The boss of the horns is typically arranged in such a way that two antelope striking at each other's horns cannot crack each other's skulls, making a fight via horn more ritualized than dangerous. Many species have ridges in their horns for at least two-thirds the length of their horns, but these ridges are not a direct indicator of age.

== Behavior ==
=== Mating strategies ===
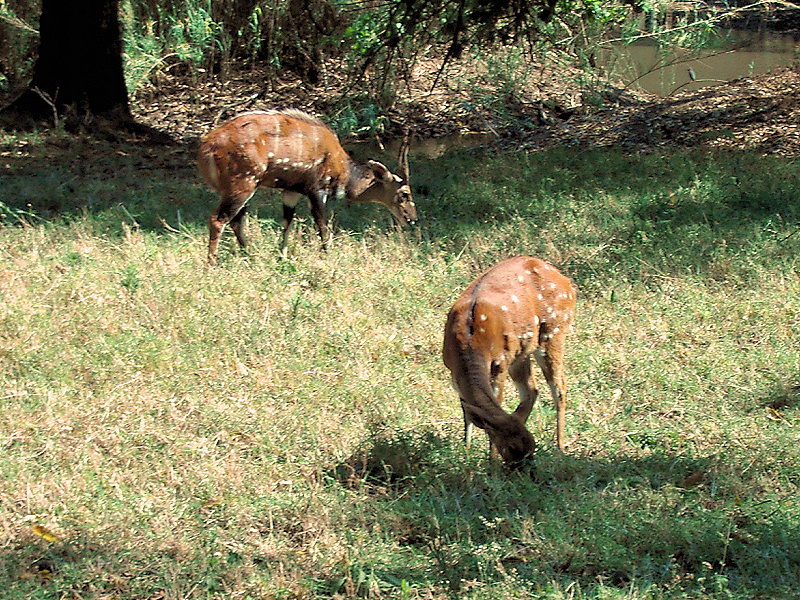
Forest-dwelling bushbuck

Antelope are often classified by their reproductive behavior.

Small antelope, such as dik-diks, tend to be monogamous. They live in a forest environment with patchy resources, and a male is unable to monopolize more than one female due to this sparse distribution. Larger forest species often form very small herds of two to four females and one male.

Some species, such as lechwes, pursue a lek breeding system, where the males gather on a lekking ground and compete for a small territory, while the females appraise males and choose one with which to mate.

Large grazing antelope, such as impala or wildebeest, form large herds made up of many females and a single breeding male, which excludes all other males, often by combat.

=== Defense ===
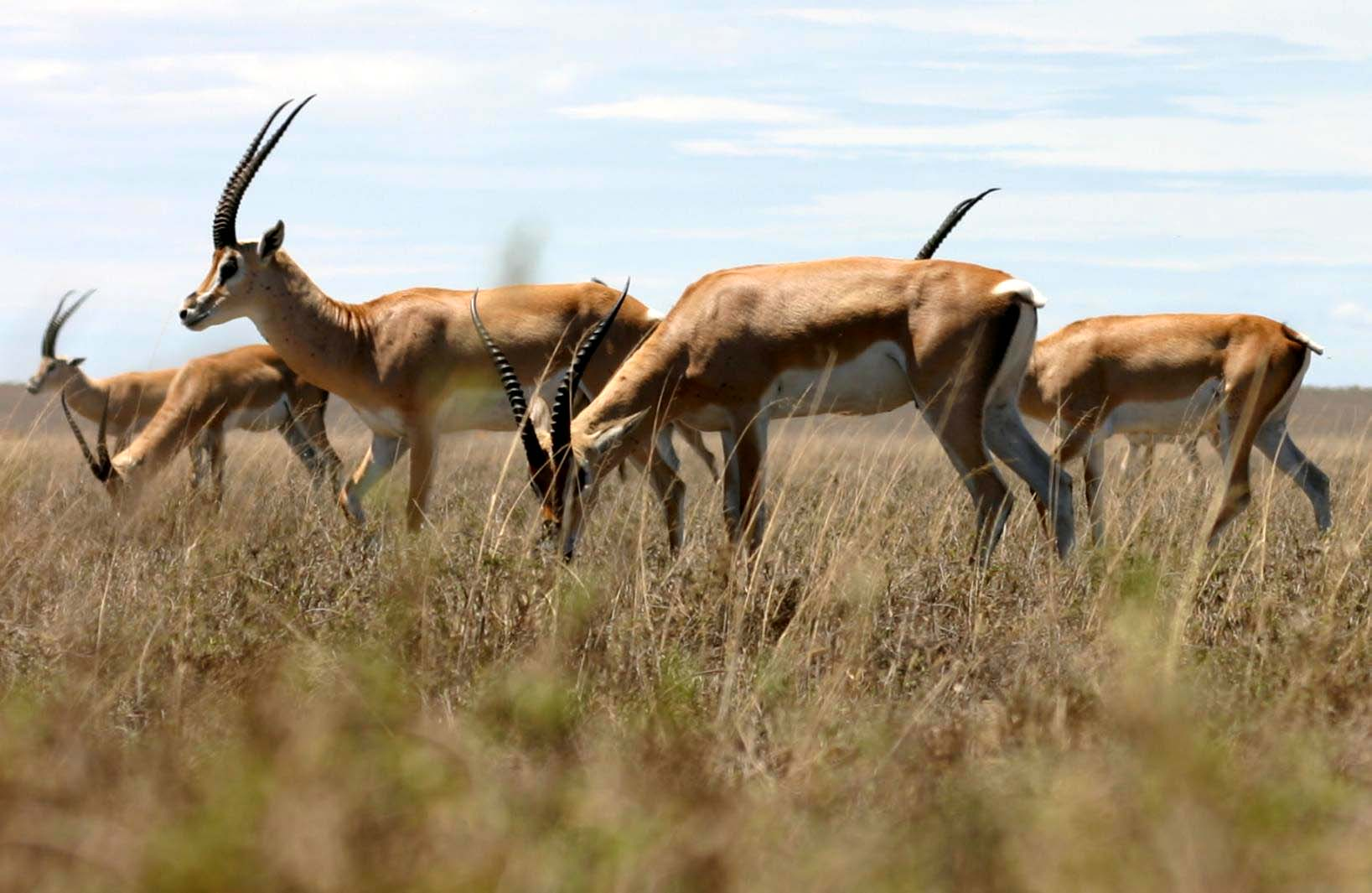
Fast-running gazelles prefer open grassland habitat

Antelope pursue a number of defense strategies, often dictated by their morphology.

Large antelope that gather in large herds, such as wildebeest, rely on numbers and running speed for protection. In some species, adults will encircle the offspring, protecting them from predators when threatened. Many forest antelope rely on cryptic coloring and good hearing to avoid predators. Forest antelope often have very large ears and dark or striped colorations. Small antelope, especially duikers, evade predation by jumping into dense bush where the predator cannot pursue. Springboks use a behavior known as stotting to confuse predators.

Open grassland species have nowhere to hide from predators, so they tend to be fast runners. They are agile and have good endurance—these are advantages when pursued by sprint-dependent predators such as cheetahs, which are the fastest of land animals, but tire quickly. Reaction distances vary with predator species and behaviour. For example, gazelles may not flee from a lion until it is closer than 200 m (650 ft)—lions hunt as a pride or by surprise, usually by stalking; one that can be seen clearly is unlikely to attack. However, sprint-dependent cheetahs will cause gazelles to flee at a range of over 800 metres (1/2 mile).

If escape is not an option, antelope are capable of fighting back. Oryxes in particular have been known to stand sideways like many unrelated bovids to appear larger than they are, and may charge at a predator as a last resort.

== Status ==
About 25 species are rated by the IUCN as endangered, such as the dama gazelle and mountain nyala. A number of subspecies are also endangered, including the giant sable antelope and the mhorr gazelle. The main causes for concern for these species are habitat loss, competition with cattle for grazing, and trophy hunting.

The chiru or Tibetan antelope is hunted for its pelt, which is used in making shahtoosh wool, used in shawls. Since the fur can only be removed from dead animals, and each animal yields very little of the downy fur, several antelope must be killed to make a single shawl. This unsustainable demand has led to enormous declines in the chiru population.

The saiga is hunted for its horns, which are considered an aphrodisiac by some cultures. Only the males have horns, and have been so heavily hunted that some herds contain up to 800 females to one male. The species showed a steep decline and was formerly classified as critically endangered. However, the saigas have experienced a massive regrowth and are now classified as near threatened.

== Lifespan ==
It is difficult to determine how long antelope live in the wild. With the preference of predators towards old and infirm individuals, which can no longer sustain peak speeds, few wild prey-animals live as long as their biological potential. In captivity, wildebeest have lived beyond 20 years old, and impalas have reached their late teens.

== Relationship with humans ==
=== Culture ===
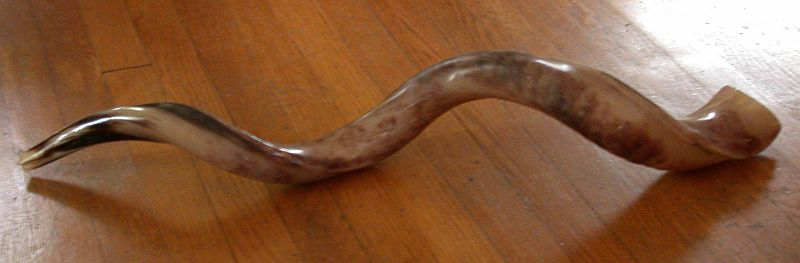
Greater kudu horn shofar

The antelope's horn is prized for supposed medicinal and magical powers in many places. The horn of the male saiga, in Eastern practice, is ground as an aphrodisiac, for which it has been hunted nearly to extinction. In the Congo, it is thought to confine spirits. The antelope's ability to run swiftly has also led to their association with the wind, such as in the Rig Veda, as the steeds of the Maruts and the wind god Vayu. There is, however, no scientific evidence that the horns of any antelope have any effect on human physiology or characteristics.

In Mali, antelope were believed to have brought the skills of agriculture to mankind.

=== Domestication ===
Domestication of animals requires certain traits in the animal that antelope do not typically display. Most species are difficult to contain in any density, due to the territoriality of the males, or in the case of oryxes (which have a relatively hierarchical social structure), an aggressive disposition; they can easily kill a human. Because many have extremely good jumping abilities, providing adequate fencing is a challenge. Also, antelope will consistently display a fear response to perceived predators, such as humans, making them very difficult to herd or handle. Although antelope have diets and rapid growth rates highly suitable for domestication, this tendency to panic and their non-hierarchical social structure explains why farm-raised antelope are uncommon. Ancient Egyptians kept herds of gazelles and addax for meat, and occasionally pets. It is unknown whether they were truly domesticated, but it seems unlikely, as no domesticated gazelles exist today.

However, humans have had success taming certain species, such as the elands. These antelope sometimes jump over each other's backs when alarmed, but this incongruous talent seems to be exploited only by wild members of the species; tame elands do not take advantage of it and can be enclosed within a very low fence. Their meat, milk, and hides are all of excellent quality, and experimental eland husbandry has been going on for some years in both Ukraine and Zimbabwe. In both locations, the animal has proved wholly amenable to domestication. Similarly, European visitors to Arabia reported "tame gazelles are very common in the Asiatic countries of which the species is a native; and the poetry of these countries abounds in allusions both to the beauty and the gentleness of the gazelle." Other antelope that have been tamed successfully include the gemsbok, the kudu, and the springbok.

=== Hybrid antelope ===
A wide variety of antelope hybrids have been recorded in zoos, game parks, and wildlife ranches, due to either a lack of more appropriate mates in enclosures shared with other species or a misidentification of species. The ease of hybridization shows how closely related some antelope species are. With few exceptions, most hybrid antelope occur only in captivity.

Most hybrids occur between species within the same genus. All reported examples occur within the same subfamily. As with most mammal hybrids, the less closely related the parents, the more likely the offspring will be sterile.

=== Heraldry ===
Arms of the Duke of Abercorn in Scotland, featuring two silver antelope

Antelope are a common symbol in heraldry, though they occur in a highly distorted form from nature. The heraldic antelope has the body of a stag and the tail of a lion, with serrated horns, and a small tusk at the end of its snout. This form was invented by European heralds in the Middle Ages, who knew little of foreign animals and made up the rest. The antelope was mistakenly imagined to be a monstrous beast of prey; the 16th century poet Edmund Spenser referred to it as being "as fierce and fell as a wolf."

Antelope can all also occur in their natural form, in which case they are termed "natural antelope" to distinguish them from the more usual heraldic antelope. The arms previously used by the Republic of South Africa featured a natural antelope, along with an oryx.

== See also ==
- Great Nile Migration Landscape
- Megafauna
