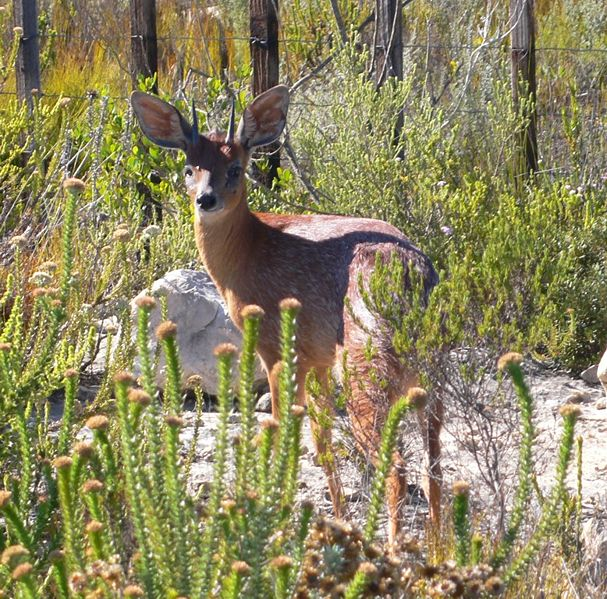
- A ram at De Hoop, Western Cape

Conservation status
- Least Concern (IUCN 3.1)

Scientific classification
- Kingdom: Animalia
- Phylum: Chordata
- Class: Mammalia
- Order: Artiodactyla
- Family: Bovidae
- Subfamily: Antilopinae
- Genus: Raphicerus
- Species: R. melanotis

Binomial name
- Raphicerus melanotis (Thunberg, 1811)
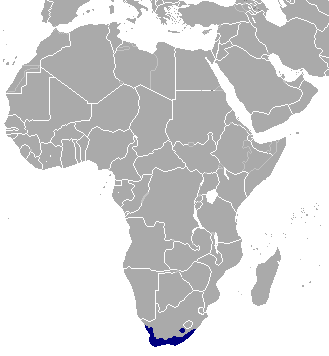
- range

= Cape grysbok =

Species of mammal

The Cape or southern grysbok (Raphicerus melanotis) is a small antelope that is endemic to the Western Cape region of South Africa between Albany and the Cederberg mountains.

== Description ==
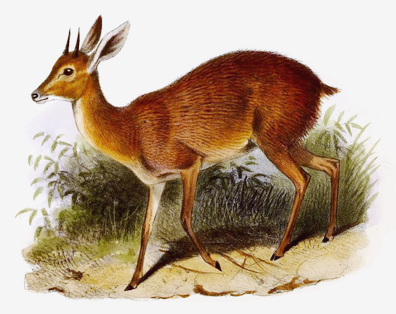
Illustrated in The Book of Antelopes (1894)

It has a rough, reddish sandy coat flecked in white. The head, neck and legs are less flecked and somewhat yellowish, while the inside of the ears, eye-rings, mouth area, throat and underside are white. There is a black "bridge" to the nose and a dark scent gland in front of the eye. It stands only 21" (45–55 cm) at the shoulder and weighs slightly more than 20 pounds (8–12 kg). The short tail of the Cape grysbok measures 4 to 8 cm and is almost invisible. Males have short, sharp and straight horns about 8 cm long, which are smooth. The Cape grysbok can fluff out the fur at its rear end to make itself look bigger.

== Habitat ==
The Cape grysbok's native habitat is the "Fynbos biome" (Cape Floristic Region), and it inhabits thick shrubland. It can sometimes be found browsing orchards and vineyards. In the Cape Peninsula the grysbok can be found in urban edges close to human activity. It may also be found in reed beds and along the riverbed of the southern Karoo.

== Habits ==
The Cape grysbok is probably territorial as sightings are mostly of individual animals. It is a browser. It can apparently go without drinking water for long periods, gaining most of its requirements from its food. It is primarily nocturnal, though it may be seen during early morning and late evening during the southern winter. Like Sharpe's grysbok they use a communal latrine and mark plants in its vicinity with secretions from their pre-orbital glands. It defends itself by jumping forward toward its target then running away.

== Breeding ==
Lambs are born in the southern summer after a gestation period of about 6 months. They stay hidden and grow fast.

== Similar species ==
The similar Sharpe's grysbok (Raphicerus sharpei) can be found in south-eastern Africa. The primary physical difference between the two grysboks is that Sharpe's has a pair of "false hooves" above the fetlocks.

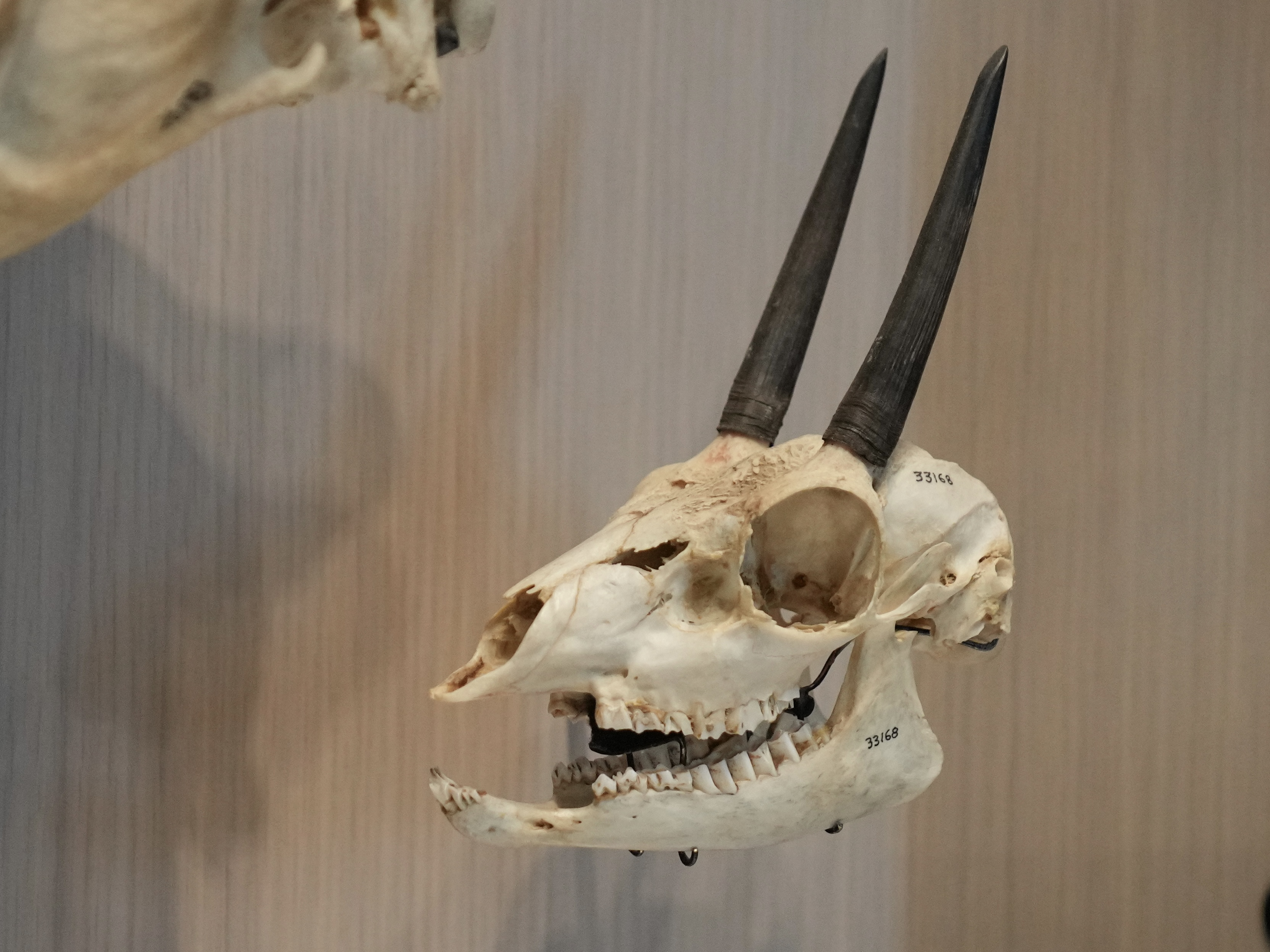
Grysbok (Raphicerus melanotis) skull on display at Burke Museum of Natural History and Culture in Seattle, Washington.
