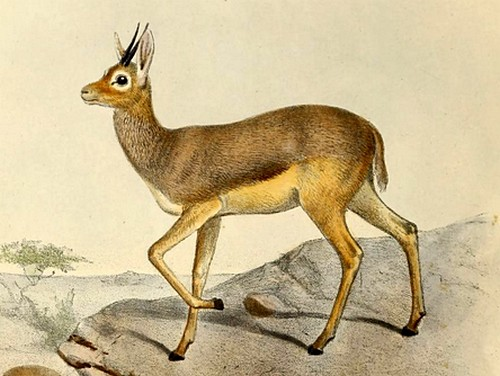

Conservation status
- Vulnerable (IUCN 3.1)

Scientific classification
- Kingdom: Animalia
- Phylum: Chordata
- Class: Mammalia
- Order: Artiodactyla
- Family: Bovidae
- Subfamily: Antilopinae
- Genus: Dorcatragus; Noack, 1894
- Species: D. megalotis

Binomial name
- Dorcatragus megalotis (Menges, 1894)
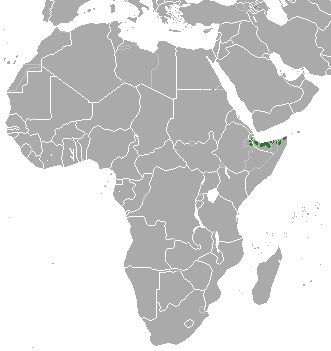
- Beira range

Synonyms
- Oreotragus megalotis Menges,1894

= Beira (antelope) =

Species of mammal

The beira (Dorcatragus megalotis) is a small antelope that inhabits arid regions of the Horn of Africa. It is the only current species in the genus Dorcatragus.

== Description ==
The beira has a bushy tail and a coarse coat which is reddish grey on the back separated from the white underparts by a dark band which extends along each side from the elbow to the rear leg. Its long, slender legs are fawn-coloured and the head is yellowish red with black eyelids and white eye rings. The beira has disproportionately large ears, which are 15 cm (5.9 in) long and 7.5 cm (3.0 in) across with white fur on their interiors. Only the males have horns which are 7.5–10 cm (3.0–3.9 in) long, straight spikes which grow out vertically from near the sides of the ears. The length of the animal is 80–86 cm (31–34 in), it stands 50–60 cm (20–24 in) at the shoulder and weighs between 9–11.5 kg (20–25 lb).

== Distribution ==
The beira is endemic to northeast Africa, it occurs in the far south of Djibouti southwards across Somaliland and northern Somalia, and into extreme northeastern Ethiopia. The main part of its range is in Somaliland, from the frontier with Djibouti, east into Puntland in northern Somalia and the Nogaal Valley. Its occurrence in Djibouti was confirmed in only 1993.

== Habitat ==
Beira are found in rocky or stony hillsides and slopes, among dry, grassland interspersed with acacia scrub and many sites are on hills with flat summits and steep stony sides.

== Habits ==
Beira have only been recorded giving birth in April at the height of the rainy season. Gestation lasts six months and one calf is born. They are most active in the early morning and late afternoon, and rest in the middle of the day. They are extremely wary, and are alerted to the slightest disturbance by their excellent hearing, moving off with great speed across the scree on the rocky slopes, bounding with agility from rock to rock on steeper, less broken terrain. Beira are adapted to arid climate and do not need to find water, as they obtain all they need from the plants they browse. Beira typically live in territorial groups of two to five individuals, including only one adult male, but larger groups have been recorded and these probably occur when family groups meet up. Beira are predominantly browsers, but also graze when grass is available. Hyenas, caracals and jackals are the main predators of beira, and where they occur lions and leopards will take them too.

== Conservation ==
The beira is subject to some low level hunting but its small size, extreme wariness, and the inaccessible rocky habitat may allow it to withstand hunting pressure. Overgrazing by domestic goats, drought and cutting of acacia scrub for charcoal production are thought to be greater threats. It is listed as Vulnerable by the IUCN. In Djibouti it is thought to be rare but not endangered. and its status in Ethiopia is currently unknown, the last record being in 1972.

The only captive breeding group of beira was at Al Wabra Wildlife Preservation where they have been successfully bred and the number reached a peak of 58 in 2005.

== Name ==
The term 'beira' is derived from its Somali name.
