= List of bovids =

Species in mammal family Bovidae

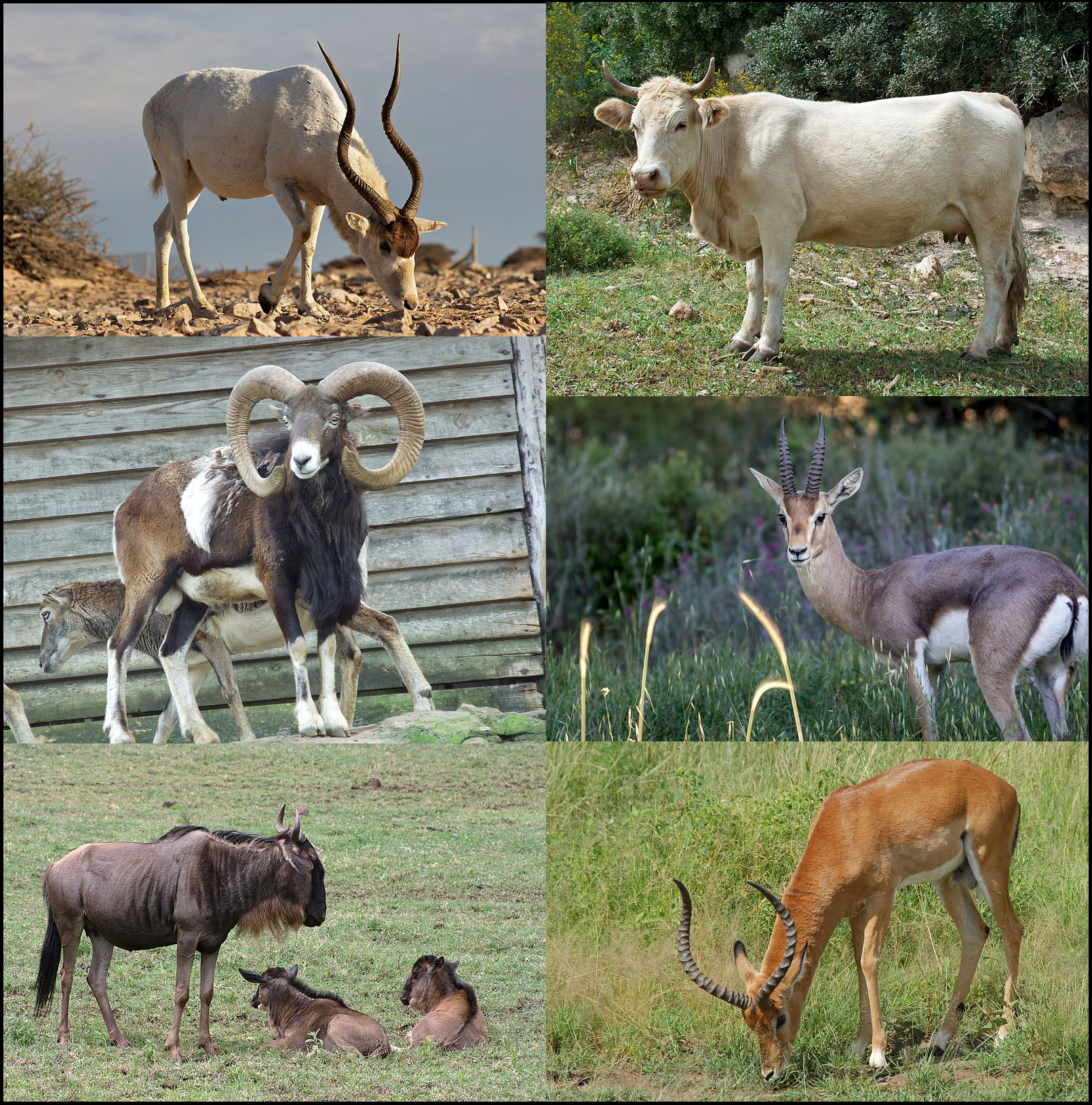
Six bovid species (clockwise from top left): addax, cattle, mountain gazelle, impala, blue wildebeest, and mouflon

Bovidae is a family of hoofed ruminant mammals in the order Artiodactyla. A member of this family is called a bovid. They are widespread throughout Africa, Asia, Europe, and North America, and are found in a variety of biomes, most typically forest, savanna, shrubland, and grassland. Bovids range in size from the 38 cm (15 in) long royal antelope to the 3.3 m (11 ft) long gaur, which can reach 1,500 kg (3,300 lb) in weight. Over a billion each of domesticated sheep, cattle, and goats, and over 200 million domesticated water buffalo, 14 million domestic yak, and 300,000 domesticated gayal are used in farming worldwide. Many wild species do not have population estimates, though the impala, springbok, and harnessed bushbuck have population sizes of over one million, while several species of bovid are considered endangered or critically endangered with populations as low as 25. One species, the scimitar oryx, was once extinct in the wild, though populations are now recovering. The bluebuck went extinct in the last 200 years, and the aurochs went extinct 400 years ago. A third extinct species, the red gazelle, potentially never existed, and the kouprey is potentially extinct, with no sightings since 1969.

The 146 extant species of Bovidae are split into 53 genera within 10 subfamilies: Aepycerotinae, or the impala; Alcelaphinae, containing the bontebok, hartebeest, wildebeest, and relatives; Antilopinae, containing several antelope, gazelles, and relatives; Bovinae, containing cattle, buffalos, bison, and other antelopes; Caprinae, containing goats, sheep, ibex, serows and relatives; Cephalophinae, or duikers; Hippotraginae, containing the addax, oryx, and relatives; Nesotraginae, or dwarf antelopes; Oreotraginae, or the klipspringer; and Reduncinae, or reedbuck and kob antelopes. Extinct species have also been placed into these subfamilies, as well as the extinct Hypsodontinae, Oiocerinae, and Tethytraginae subfamilies. Over one hundred extinct Bovidae species have been discovered, though due to ongoing research and discoveries the exact number and categorization is not fixed.

== Conventions ==
IUCN Red List categories
Conservation status
- EX: Extinct (2 species)
- EW: Extinct in the wild (0 species)
- CR: Critically endangered (8 species)
- EN: Endangered (18 species)
- VU: Vulnerable (25 species)
- NT: Near threatened (24 species)
- LC: Least concern (59 species)

Other categories
- DD: Data deficient (3 species)
- NE: Not evaluated (9 species)

The author citation for the species or genus is given after the scientific name; parentheses around the author citation indicate that this was not the original taxonomic placement. Conservation status codes listed follow the International Union for Conservation of Nature (IUCN) Red List of Threatened Species. Range maps are provided wherever possible; if a range map is not available, a description of the bovid's range is provided. Ranges are based on the IUCN Red List for that species unless otherwise noted. All extinct species or subspecies listed alongside extant species went extinct after 1500 CE, and are indicated by a dagger symbol "†".

== Classification ==
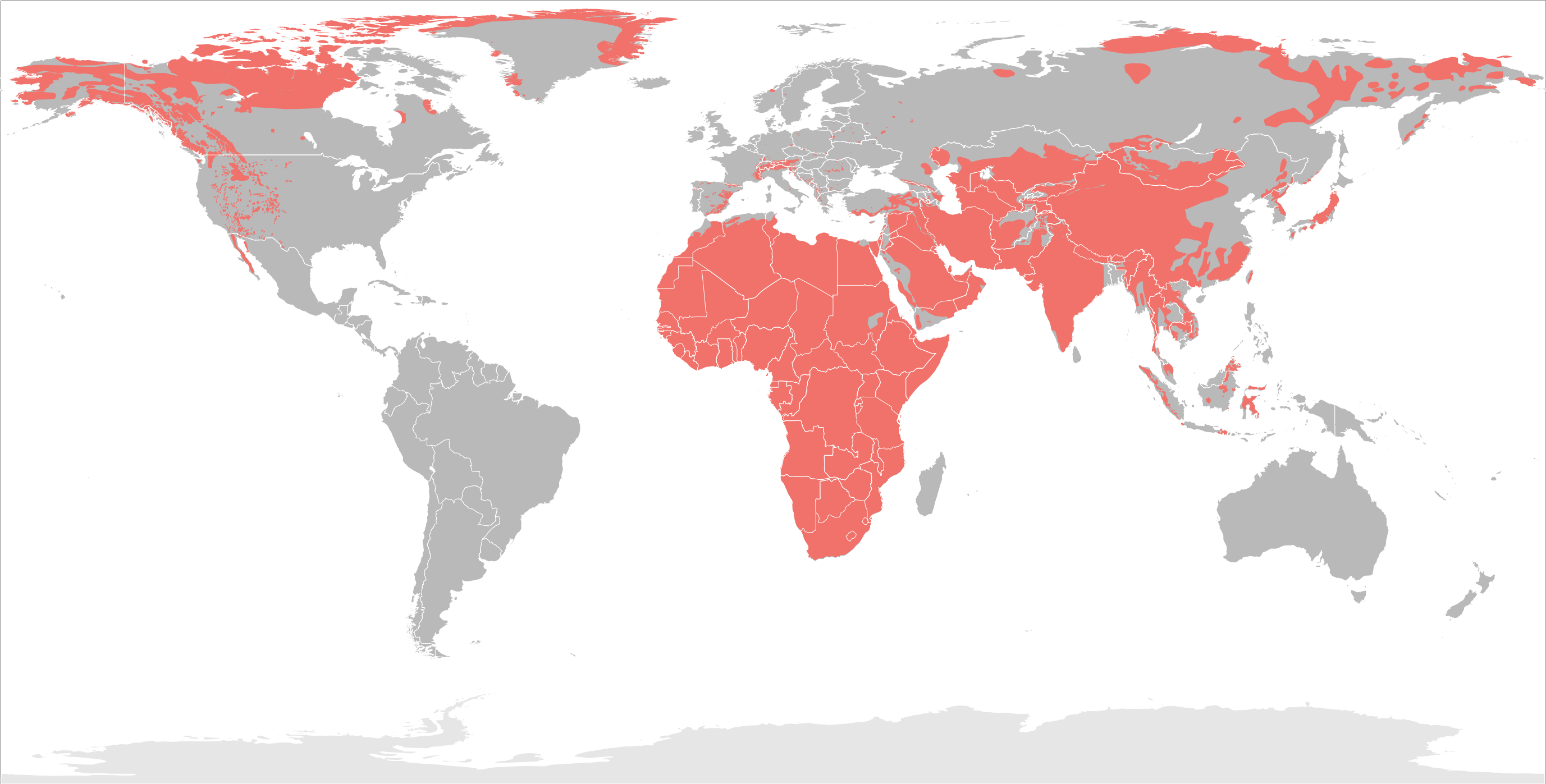
Bovidae distribution

The family Bovidae consists of 146 extant species belonging to 53 genera in 10 subfamilies and divided into hundreds of subspecies. This does not include hybrid species or extinct prehistoric species. Additionally, the bluebuck went extinct in the last 200 years, and the aurochs went extinct 400 years ago.

- Subfamily Aepycerotinae
  - Genus Aepyceros: one species
- Subfamily Alcelaphinae
  - Genus Alcelaphus: one species
  - Genus Beatragus: one species
  - Genus Connochaetes: two species
  - Genus Damaliscus: two species
- Subfamily Antilopinae
  - Genus Ammodorcas: one species
  - Genus Antidorcas: one species
  - Genus Antilope: one species
  - Genus Dorcatragus: one species
  - Genus Eudorcas: five species
  - Genus Gazella: ten species
  - Genus Litocranius: one species
  - Genus Madoqua: four species
  - Genus Nanger: three species
  - Genus Neotragus: three species
  - Genus Ourebia: one species
  - Genus Procapra: three species
  - Genus Raphicerus: three species
  - Genus Saiga: one species
- Subfamily Bovinae
  - Genus Bison: two species
  - Genus Bos: ten species (one extinct)
  - Genus Boselaphus: one species
  - Genus Bubalus: five species
  - Genus Pseudoryx: one species
  - Genus Syncerus: one species
  - Genus Taurotragus: two species
  - Genus Tetracerus: one species
  - Genus Tragelaphus: seven species
- Subfamily Caprinae
  - Genus Ammotragus: one species
  - Genus Arabitragus: one species
  - Genus Budorcas: one species
  - Genus Capra: nine species
  - Genus Capricornis: four species
  - Genus Hemitragus: one species
  - Genus Naemorhedus: four species
  - Genus Nilgiritragus: one species
  - Genus Oreamnos: one species
  - Genus Ovibos: one species
  - Genus Ovis: seven species
  - Genus Pantholops: one species
  - Genus Pseudois: one species
  - Genus Rupicapra: two species
- Subfamily Cephalophinae
  - Genus Cephalophus: fifteen species
  - Genus Philantomba: three species
  - Genus Sylvicapra: one species
- Subfamily Hippotraginae
  - Genus Addax: one species
  - Genus Hippotragus: three species (one extinct)
  - Genus Oryx: four species
- Subfamily Nesotraginae
  - Genus Nesotragus: two species
- Subfamily Oreotraginae
  - Genus Oreotragus: one species
- Subfamily Reduncinae
  - Genus Kobus: five species
  - Genus Pelea: one species
  - Genus Redunca: three species

- Bovidae
  - - Bovinae
      - Boselaphini
        - Boselaphus
        - Tetracerus
      - Bovini
        - Bison
        - Bos
        - Bubalus
        - Pseudoryx
        - Syncerus
      - Tragelaphini
        - Taurotragus
        - Tragelaphus
  - - - Aepycerotinae
        Aepyceros
      - Nesotraginae
        Nesotragus
    - - - - Antilopinae
            - Antilopini
              - Ammodorcas
              - Antidorcas
              - Antilope
              - Eudorcas
              - Gazella
              - Litocranius
              - Nanger
              - Procapra
            - Neotragini
              - Dorcatragus
              - Madoqua
              - Neotragus
              - Ourebia
              - Raphicerus
        - - Cephalophinae
            - Cephalophus
            - Philantomba
            - Sylvicapra
          - Oreotraginae
            Oreotragus
      - - - Reduncinae
            - Kobus
            - Pelea
            - Redunca
        - - - Caprinae
              - Caprini
                - Ammotragus
                - Arabitragus
                - Budorcas
                - Capra
                - Hemitragus
                - Nilgiritragus
                - Oreamnos
                - Ovis
                - Pseudois
                - Rupicapra
              - Ovibovini
                - Capricornis
                - Naemorhedus
                - Ovibos
              - Pantholopini
                - Pantholops
          - - Alcelaphinae
              - Alcelaphus
              - Beatragus
              - Connochaetes
              - Damaliscus
            - Hippotraginae
              - Addax
              - Hippotragus
              - Oryx

== Bovids ==
The following classification is based on the taxonomy described by Mammal Species of the World (2005), with augmentation by generally accepted proposals made since using molecular phylogenetic analysis.

=== Subfamily Aepycerotinae ===
Genus Aepyceros – Sundevall, 1847 – one species
Common name	Scientific name and subspecies	Range	Size and ecology	IUCN status and estimated population
Impala	A. melampus (Lichtenstein, 1812) Two subspecies: A. m. melampus (common impala); A. m. petersi (black-faced impala)	Southern Africa (Common impala in green)	Size: 120–160 cm (47–63 in) long, plus 30–45 cm (12–18 in) tail Habitat: Savanna, shrubland, and grassland Diet: Grass and shrubs	LC 2,000,000

=== Subfamily Alcelaphinae ===
Genus Alcelaphus – Blainville, 1816 – one species
Common name	Scientific name and subspecies	Range	Size and ecology	IUCN status and estimated population
Hartebeest	A. buselaphus (Pallas, 1766) Eight subspecies: A. b. buselaphus (bubal hartebeest)†; A. b. caama (red hartebeest); A. b. cokii (Coke's hartebeest); A. b. lelwel (Lelwel hartebeest); A. b. lichtensteinii (Lichtenstein's hartebeest); A. b. major (western hartebeest); A. b. swaynei (Swayne's hartebeest); A. b. tora (tora hartebeest)	Scattered sub-Saharan Africa	Size: 150–245 cm (59–96 in) long, plus 30–70 cm (12–28 in) tail Habitat: Forest, savanna, shrubland, and grassland Diet: Grass	LC Unknown

Genus Beatragus – Heller, 1912 – one species
Common name	Scientific name and subspecies	Range	Size and ecology	IUCN status and estimated population
Hirola	B. hunteri (P. L. Sclater, 1889)	Border between Kenya and Somalia	Size: 120–205 cm (47–81 in) long, plus 30–45 cm (12–18 in) tail Habitat: Savanna, shrubland, and grassland Diet: Grass, as well as forbs	CR 200–250

Genus Connochaetes – Lichtenstein, 1812 – two species
Common name	Scientific name and subspecies	Range	Size and ecology	IUCN status and estimated population
Black wildebeest	C. gnou (Zimmermann, 1780)	Southern Africa	Size: 212–242 cm (83–95 in) long, plus 31–45 cm (12–18 in) tail Habitat: Shrubland and grassland Diet: Grass	LC 11,200
Blue wildebeest	C. taurinus (Burchell, 1824) Five subspecies: C. t. albojubatus (eastern white-bearded wildebeest); C. t. cooksoni (Cookson's wildebeest); C. t. johnstoni (Nyassaland wildebeest); C. t. mearnsi (western white-bearded wildebeest); C. t. taurinus (common wildebeest)	Southern and eastern Africa	Size: 170–240 cm (67–94 in) long, plus 60–100 cm (24–39 in) tail Habitat: Savanna and grassland Diet: Grass	LC Unknown

Genus Damaliscus – P. L. Sclater, Thomas, 1894 – two species
Common name	Scientific name and subspecies	Range	Size and ecology	IUCN status and estimated population
Bontebok	D. pygargus (Pallas, 1767) Two subspecies: D. p. phillipsi (blesbok); D. p. pygargus	Southern Africa	Size: 140–160 cm (55–63 in) long, plus 30–45 cm (12–18 in) tail Habitat: Shrubland and grassland Diet: Grass and burnt veldt shrubs	LC 55,000
Tsessebe	D. lunatus (Burchell, 1823) Six subspecies: D. l. jimela (topi); D. l. korrigum (korrigum); D. l. lunatus (common tsessebe); D. l. superstes (Bangweulu tsessebe); D. l. tiang (tiang); D. l. topi (coastal topi)	Scattered sub-Saharan Africa	Size: 150–230 cm (59–91 in) long, plus 36–42 cm (14–17 in) tail Habitat: Savanna, shrubland, and grassland Diet: Grass	LC Unknown

=== Subfamily Antilopinae ===
Genus Ammodorcas – Thomas, 1891 – one species
Common name	Scientific name and subspecies	Range	Size and ecology	IUCN status and estimated population
Dibatag	A. clarkei (Thomas, 1891)	Horn of Africa	Size: 152–168 cm (60–66 in) long, plus 25–35 cm (10–14 in) tail Habitat: Shrubland and grassland Diet: Leaves and shoots	VU 2,800

Genus Antidorcas – Sundevall, 1847 – one species
Common name	Scientific name and subspecies	Range	Size and ecology	IUCN status and estimated population
Springbok	A. marsupialis (Zimmermann, 1780) Three subspecies: A. m. angolensis; A. m. hofmeyri; A. m. marsupialis	Southern Africa	Size: 120–150 cm (47–59 in) long, plus 14–28 cm (6–11 in) tail Habitat: Savanna, shrubland, grassland, and desert Diet: Shrubs and grass	LC 1,400,000–1,750,000

Genus Antilope – Pallas, 1766 – one species
Common name	Scientific name and subspecies	Range	Size and ecology	IUCN status and estimated population
Blackbuck	A. cervicapra (Linnaeus, 1758) Two subspecies: A. c. cervicapra; A. c. rajputanae	India (former range in light green)	Size: Up to 120 cm (47 in) long Habitat: Forest, grassland, and desert Diet: Grass, as well as leaf litter, flowers, and fruit	LC 35,000

Genus Dorcatragus – Noack, 1894 – one species
Common name	Scientific name and subspecies	Range	Size and ecology	IUCN status and estimated population
Beira	D. megalotis (Menges, 1894)	Horn of Africa	Size: 76–87 cm (30–34 in) long, plus 5–8 cm (2–3 in) tail Habitat: Shrubland, and rocky areas Diet: Shrubs	VU 7,000

Genus Eudorcas – Fitzinger, 1869 – five species
Common name	Scientific name and subspecies	Range	Size and ecology	IUCN status and estimated population
Heuglin's gazelle	E. tilonura (Heuglin, 1863)	Northeastern Africa	Size: 55–120 cm (22–47 in) long, plus 15–27 cm (6–11 in) tail Habitat: Savanna and shrubland Diet: Grass and shrubs	EN 1,700–2,500
Mongalla gazelle	E. albonotata (W. Rothschild, 1903)	South Sudan	Size: 80–120 cm (31–47 in) long, plus 15–27 cm (6–11 in) tail Habitat: Savanna and grassland Diet: Grass and shrubs	LC Unknown
Red gazelle†	E. rufina Thomas, 1894	Northern Africa	Size: Unknown Habitat: Unknown Diet: Unknown	DD 0
Red-fronted gazelle	E. rufifrons (Gray, 1846) Five subspecies: E. r. centralis (eastern Chad red-fronted gazelle); E. r. hasleri (north Nigeria red-fronted gazelle); E. r. kanuri (Kanuri red-fronted gazelle); E. r. laevipes (Nubian red-fronted gazelle); E. r. rufifrons (Senegal red-fronted gazelle)	Sahel zone in central and western Africa	Size: 80–120 cm (31–47 in) long, plus 15–27 cm (6–11 in) tail Habitat: Forest, savanna, shrubland, and grassland Diet: Grass and shrubs	VU Unknown
Thomson's gazelle	E. thomsonii (Günther, 1884) Two subspecies: E. t. nasalis (Serengeti Thomson's gazelle); E. t. thomsonii (eastern Thomson's gazelle)	Eastern Africa	Size: 80–120 cm (31–47 in) long, plus 15–27 cm (6–11 in) tail Habitat: Savanna and grassland Diet: Grass, as well as forbs and fruit	LC 145,000

Genus Gazella – Blainville, 1816 – ten species
Common name	Scientific name and subspecies	Range	Size and ecology	IUCN status and estimated population
Arabian gazelle	G. arabica (Lichtenstein, 1827) Two subspecies: G. a. arabica; G. a. bilkis	Arabian Peninsula	Size: About 100 cm (39 in) long, plus 9 cm (4 in) tail Habitat: Shrubland and grassland Diet: Cyperus sedges	VU 5,000–7,000
Arabian sand gazelle	G. marica Thomas, 1897	Arabian Peninsula	Size: About 97 cm (38 in) long, plus 15 cm (6 in) tail Habitat: Desert Diet: Grass and forbs	VU 1,700–2,200
Chinkara	G. bennettii (Sykes, 1831) Six subspecies: G. b. bennettii (Deccan chinkara); G. b. christii (Gujarat chinkara); G. b. fuscifrons (Kennion gazelle); G. b. karamii (Bushehr gazelle); G. b. salinarum (Salt Range gazelle); G. b. shikarii (jebeer gazelle)	South Asia	Size: 90–120 cm (35–47 in) long Habitat: Forest, shrubland, grassland, and desert Diet: Grass, leaves, crops, and fruit	LC 50,000–70,000
Cuvier's gazelle	G. cuvieri (Ogilby, 1841)	Northwestern Africa	Size: 95–105 cm (37–41 in) long, plus 15–20 cm (6–8 in) tail Habitat: Forest, shrubland, rocky areas, and desert Diet: Leaves and grass	VU 2,300–4,600
Dorcas gazelle	G. dorcas (Linnaeus, 1758) Six subspecies: G. d. beccarii (Eritrean dorcas gazelle); G. d. dorcas (Egyptian dorcas gazelle); G. d. isabella (Isabelle dorcas gazelle); G. d. massaesyla (Moroccan dorcas gazelle); G. d. osiris (Saharan dorcas gazelle); G. d. pelzelnii (Pelzeln's gazelle)	Northern Africa	Size: 90–110 cm (35–43 in) long, plus 15–20 cm (6–8 in) tail Habitat: Shrubland, grassland, and desert Diet: Acacia tree flowers, leaves, and pods, as well as other fruit and leaves	VU Unknown
Erlanger's gazelle	G. erlangeri Neumann, 1906	Arabian Peninsula	Size: 110–125 cm (43–49 in) long, plus 15–20 cm (6–8 in) tail Habitat: Desert Diet: Grass	NE Unknown
Goitered gazelle	G. subgutturosa (Güldenstädt, 1780) Three subspecies: G. s. gracilicornis (Turkmen gazelle); G. s. subgutturosa (Persian gazelle); G. s. yarkandensis (Yarkand gazelle)	Western and central Asia	Size: 90–115 cm (35–45 in) long, plus 15–20 cm (6–8 in) tail Habitat: Shrubland, grassland, and desert Diet: Grass and low plants	VU 42,000–49,000
Mountain gazelle	G. gazella (Pallas, 1766) Six subspecies: G. g. acaciae; G. g. cora; G. g. darehshourii; G. g. farasani; G. g. gazella; G. g. muscatensis	Mediterranean western Asia	Size: 100–125 cm (39–49 in) long, plus 8–13 cm (3–5 in) tail Habitat: Desert and coastal marine Diet: Grass, herbs, and shrubs	EN 2,500
Rhim gazelle	G. leptoceros (F. Cuvier, 1842) Two subspecies: G. l. leptoceros; G. l. loderi	Scattered northern Africa	Size: 100–110 cm (39–43 in) long, plus 15–20 cm (6–8 in) tail Habitat: Desert Diet: Desert vegetation	EN 300–600
Speke's gazelle	G. spekei Blyth, 1863	Horn of Africa	Size: 95–105 cm (37–41 in) long, plus 15–20 cm (6–8 in) tail Habitat: Shrubland, grassland, and desert Diet: Grass and leaves	EN Unknown

Genus Litocranius – Kohl, 1886 – one species
Common name	Scientific name and subspecies	Range	Size and ecology	IUCN status and estimated population
Gerenuk	L. walleri (Brooke, 1878) Two subspecies: L. w. sclateri (northern gerenuk); L. w. walleri (southern gerenuk)	Horn of Africa	Size: 140–160 cm (55–63 in) long, plus 2–4 cm (1–2 in) tail Habitat: Savanna and shrubland Diet: Shrubs	NT Unknown

Genus Madoqua – (Ogilby, 1837) – four species
Common name	Scientific name and subspecies	Range	Size and ecology	IUCN status and estimated population
Günther's dik-dik	M. guentheri Thomas, 1894 Two subspecies: M. g. guentheri; M. g. smithii	Horn of Africa	Size: 55–65 cm (22–26 in) long, plus 3–5 cm (1–2 in) tail Habitat: Shrubland Diet: Shrubs, leaves, and flowers	LC Unknown
Kirk's dik-dik	M. kirkii (Günther, 1880) Four subspecies: M. k. kirkii; M. k. cavendishi (Cavendish's dik-dik); M. k. damarensis (Damara dik-dik); M. k. hindei	Southeastern and southwestern Africa	Size: 52–67 cm (20–26 in) long, plus 3–6 cm (1–2 in) tail Habitat: Shrubland Diet: Leaves, as well as grass, herbs, and sedge	LC Unknown
Salt's dik-dik	M. saltiana (Desmarest, 1816) Five subspecies: M. s. hararensis; M. s. lawrancei; M. s. phillipsi (Phillip's dik-dik); M. s. saltiana (Salt's sik-dik); M. s. swaynei (Swayne's dik-dik)	Horn of Africa	Size: 52–67 cm (20–26 in) long, plus 3–6 cm (1–2 in) tail Habitat: Forest and shrubland Diet: Acacia bushes, as well as leaves, buds, flowers, fruit, and herbs	LC Unknown
Silver dik-dik	M. piacentinii Drake-Brockman, 1911	Horn of Africa	Size: 45–50 cm (18–20 in) long, plus 3–4 cm (1–2 in) tail Habitat: Shrubland Diet: Grass and shrubs	DD Unknown

Genus Nanger – Lataste, 1885 – three species
Common name	Scientific name and subspecies	Range	Size and ecology	IUCN status and estimated population
Dama gazelle	N. dama (Pallas, 1766) Three subspecies: N. d. dama; N. d. mhorr (mhorr gazelle); N. d. ruficollis (addra gazelle)	Scattered Saharan Desert and Sahel	Size: 140–168 cm (55–66 in) long Habitat: Savanna, shrubland, and desert Diet: Shrubs and grass	CR 100–200
Grant's gazelle	N. granti (Brooke, 1872) Five subspecies: N. g. brighti (Bright's gazelle); N. g. granti (southern Grant's gazelle); N. g. notata (northern Grant's gazelle); N. g. petersii (Peter's gazelle); N. g. robertsi (Robert's gazelle)	Eastern Africa	Size: 140–166 cm (55–65 in) long, plus 20–28 cm (8–11 in) tail Habitat: Savanna, shrubland, and grassland Diet: Leaves and stems, as well as grass	LC Unknown
Soemmerring's gazelle	N. soemmerringii (Cretzschmar, 1828) Three subspecies: N. s. berberana (Somali Soemmerring's gazelle); N. s. butteri (Borani Soemmerring's gazelle); N. s. soemmerringii (Sudan Soemmerring's gazelle)	Horn of Africa	Size: 125–150 cm (49–59 in) long, plus 18–23 cm (7–9 in) tail Habitat: Savanna, shrubland, and grassland Diet: Leaves, grass, and herbs	VU 4,000–5,000

Genus Neotragus – H. Smith, 1827 – one species
Common name	Scientific name and subspecies	Range	Size and ecology	IUCN status and estimated population
Royal antelope	N. pygmaeus (Linnaeus, 1758)	Western Africa	Size: 38–51 cm (15–20 in) long, plus 5–8 cm (2–3 in) tail Habitat: Forest Diet: Leaves and shoots, as well as fruit and fungi	LC Unknown

Genus Ourebia – Laurillard, 1842 – one species
Common name	Scientific name and subspecies	Range	Size and ecology	IUCN status and estimated population
Oribi	O. ourebi (Zimmermann, 1782) Eight subspecies: O. o. dorcas; O. o. gallarum; O. o. haggardi; O. o. hastata; O. o. montana; O. o. ourebi; O. o. quadriscopa; O. o. rutila	Sub-Saharan Africa	Size: 92–110 cm (36–43 in) long Habitat: Savanna and grassland Diet: Grass and shrubs	LC Unknown

Genus Procapra – Hodgson, 1846 – three species
Common name	Scientific name and subspecies	Range	Size and ecology	IUCN status and estimated population
Goa	P. picticaudata Hodgson, 1846	Western China	Size: 91–105 cm (36–41 in) long, plus 8–9 cm (3–4 in) tail Habitat: Grassland and inland wetlands Diet: Forbs and legumes, as well as grass and sedges	NT 100,000
Mongolian gazelle	P. gutturosa (Pallas, 1777)	Mongolia and nearby central Asia (historical range in light green)	Size: 100–130 cm (39–51 in) long Habitat: Grassland and desert Diet: Grass, onions, and shrubs	LC 500,000–1,500,000
Przewalski's gazelle	P. przewalskii (Büchner, 1891) Two subspecies: P. p. diversicornis; P. p. przewalskii†	Central China	Size: 105–110 cm (41–43 in) long, plus up to 11 cm (4 in) tail Habitat: Grassland and desert Diet: Shrubs and grass	EN 1,300–1,700

Genus Raphicerus – H. Smith, 1827 – three species
Common name	Scientific name and subspecies	Range	Size and ecology	IUCN status and estimated population
Cape grysbok	R. melanotis (Thunberg, 1811)	Southern Africa	Size: 65–80 cm (26–31 in) long, plus up to 4–8 cm (2–3 in) tail Habitat: Shrubland and grassland Diet: Shrubs and grass	LC Unknown
Sharpe's grysbok	R. sharpei Thomas, 1897	Southeastern Africa	Size: 65–75 cm (26–30 in) long, plus 4–8 cm (2–3 in) tail Habitat: Savanna and shrubland Diet: Shrubs and grass	LC Unknown
Steenbok	R. campestris (Thunberg, 1811) Four subspecies: R. c. campestris; R. c. capricornis; R. c. kelleni; R. c. neumanni	Southern and southeastern Africa	Size: 70–95 cm (28–37 in) long, plus 4–6 cm (2–2 in) tail Habitat: Savanna, shrubland, and grassland Diet: Shrubs, geophytes, berries, flowers, and fruit	LC Unknown

Genus Saiga – Gray, 1843 – one species
Common name	Scientific name and subspecies	Range	Size and ecology	IUCN status and estimated population
Saiga antelope	S. tatarica (Linnaeus, 1766) Two subspecies: S. t. mongolica (Mongolian saiga); S. t. tatarica (Russian saiga)	Central Asia (historical range in white)	Size: 108–146 cm (43–57 in) long, plus 6–13 cm (2–5 in) tail Habitat: Grassland and desert Diet: Grass	NT 922,600–988,500

=== Subfamily Bovinae ===
Genus Bison – H. Smith, 1827 – two species
Common name	Scientific name and subspecies	Range	Size and ecology	IUCN status and estimated population
American bison	B. bison Linnaeus, 1758	Scattered North America	Size: 210–380 cm (83–150 in) long, plus 43–90 cm (17–35 in) tail Habitat: Forest, savanna, shrubland, grassland, inland wetlands, and desert Diet: Grass, leaves, and roots, as well as sagebrush	NT 11,200–13,200 (Note: American bison population does not include around 500,000 on farms, which are almost universally bison-cattle hybrids.)
European bison	B. bonasus Linnaeus, 1758 Three subspecies: B. b. bonasus; B. b. caucasicus (Caucasian wisent)†; B. b. hungarorum (Carpathian wisent)†	Scattered Europe and western Asia	Size: 280–330 cm (110–130 in) long, plus 30–92 cm (12–36 in) tail Habitat: Forest, shrubland, grassland, and unknown Diet: Grass, sedges and herbs, as well as trees and shrubs	NT 2,500

Genus Bos – Linnaeus, 1758 – ten species
Common name	Scientific name and subspecies	Range	Size and ecology	IUCN status and estimated population
Aurochs†	B. primigenius Bojanus, 1827	Formerly Europe, Asia, and North Africa	Size: Unknown Habitat: Unknown Diet: Grass	EX 0
Banteng	B. javanicus d'Alton, 1823 Two subspecies: B. j. javanicus (Javan banteng); B. j. lowi (Bornean banteng)	Southeast Asia (possible range in red)	Size: 190–225 cm (75–89 in) long, plus 65–70 cm (26–28 in) tail Habitat: Forest and grassland Diet: Grass, sedges, herbs, and bamboo, as well as leaves, fruit, flowers, bark, and young branches of shrubs and trees	CR 2,500–4,900
Bali cattle	B. domesticus Wilckens, 1905	Southeast Asia	Size: 190–225 cm (75–89 in) long, plus 65–70 cm (26–28 in) tail Habitat: Forest and grassland Diet: Grass, sedges, herbs, and bamboo, as well as leaves, fruit, flowers, bark, and young branches of shrubs and trees	NE Unknown
Cattle	B. taurus Linnaeus, 1758	Worldwide	Size: 150–250 cm (59–98 in) long Habitat: Grassland, shrubland, forest, and desert Diet: Grass	NE Unknown (about 1.4 billion used in farming)
Gaur	B. gaurus Smith, 1827 Two subspecies: B. g. gaurus; B. g. readei	Southern and southeastern Asia	Size: 250–330 cm (98–130 in) long, plus 70–100 cm (28–39 in) tail Habitat: Forest, savanna, grassland, and shrubland Diet: Grass as well as leaves, fruit, twigs, bark, and bamboo	VU 6,000–21,000
Gayal	B. frontalis Lambert, 1804 Four subspecies: B. f. frontalis; B. f. laosiensis; B. f. sinhaleyus	South Asia	Size: 250–330 cm (98–130 in) long, plus 70–105 cm (28–41 in) tail Habitat: Forest and grassland Diet: Grass, forbs, and leaves	NE 1,000 (about 300,000 used in farming)
Kouprey	B. sauveli Urbain, 1937	Southeast Asia	Size: 210–223 cm (83–88 in) long, plus up to 100 cm (39 in) tail Habitat: Forest, savanna, and grassland Diet: Grass, sedges, and shrubs	CR 0–50
Wild yak	B. mutus (Przhevalsky, 1883)	Central Asia	Size: 306–385 cm (120–152 in) long, plus up to 60 cm (24 in) tail Habitat: Grassland and desert Diet: Grass and sedges, as well as forbs	VU 7,500–10,000
Yak	B. grunniens Linnaeus, 1766	Central Asia	Size: 145–218 cm (57–86 in) long, plus 60 cm (24 in) tail Habitat: Rocky areas and grassland Diet: Grass, shrubs, and forbs, as well as lichen and moss	NE 14 million (in farming)
Zebu	B. indicus Linnaeus, 1758	Asia	Size: 150–250 cm (59–98 in) long Habitat: Grassland, shrubland, forest, and desert Diet: Grass	NE Unknown

Genus Boselaphus – Blainville, 1816 – one species
Common name	Scientific name and subspecies	Range	Size and ecology	IUCN status and estimated population
Nilgai	B. tragocamelus (Pallas, 1766)	Indian subcontinent	Size: 180–200 cm (71–79 in) long Habitat: Forest, shrubland, and grassland Diet: Grass and shrubs	LC 70,000–100,000

Genus Bubalus – H. Smith, 1827 – five species
Common name	Scientific name and subspecies	Range	Size and ecology	IUCN status and estimated population
Lowland anoa	B. depressicornis (H. Smith, 1827)	Island of Sulawesi in Indonesia	Size: 122–188 cm (48–74 in) long, plus up to 41 cm (16 in) tail Habitat: Forest Diet: Shrubs	EN 2,500
Mountain anoa	B. quarlesi (Ouwens, 1910)	Island of Sulawesi in Indonesia	Size: 122–153 cm (48–60 in) long Habitat: Forest Diet: Grass and shrubs	EN 0–2,500
Tamaraw	B. mindorensis Heude, 1888	Island of Mindoro in the Philippines	Size: Around 220 cm (87 in) long, plus 60 cm (24 in) tail Habitat: Forest, shrubland, and grassland Diet: Grass and young bamboo shoots	CR 200–300
Water buffalo	B. bubalis (Linnaeus, 1758) Three subspecies: B. b. bubalis; B. b. kerabau; B. b. theerapati	Scattered Asia, Egypt, and South America	Size: 240–300 cm (94–118 in) long, plus 60–100 cm (24–39 in) tail Habitat: Forest and grassland Diet: Grass, as well as herbs, shrubs, and leaves	NE 202 million (on farms)
Wild water buffalo	B. arnee (Kerr, 1792) Four subspecies: B. a. arnee; B. a. fulvus; B. a. migona; B. a. septentrionalis	Scattered Southeast Asia	Size: 240–300 cm (94–118 in) long, plus up to 60–100 cm (24–39 in) tail Habitat: Forest, savanna, grassland, and inland wetlands Diet: Grass and sedges, as well as fruit and shrubs	EN 2,500

Genus Pseudoryx – Dung, Giao, Chinh, Tuoc, Arctander, MacKinnon, 1993 – one species
Common name	Scientific name and subspecies	Range	Size and ecology	IUCN status and estimated population
Saola	P. nghetinhensis Dung, Giao, Chinh, Tuoc, Arctander, MacKinnon, 1993	Annamite Range of Vietnam and Laos	Size: 143–150 cm (56–59 in) long, plus up to 25 cm (10 in) tail Habitat: Forest Diet: Leaves as well as shrubs	CR 25-750

Genus Syncerus – Hodgson, 1847 – one species
Common name	Scientific name and subspecies	Range	Size and ecology	IUCN status and estimated population
African buffalo	S. caffer (Sparrman, 1779) Four subspecies: S. c. aequinoctialis (Nile buffalo); S. c. brachyceros (Sudan buffalo); S. c. caffer (Cape buffalo); S. c. nanus (African forest buffalo)	Sub-Saharan Africa	Size: 240–340 cm (94–134 in) long, plus 75–110 cm (30–43 in) tail Habitat: Forest, savanna, shrubland, grassland, and inland wetlands Diet: Grass	NT 398,000–401,000

Genus Taurotragus – Wagner, 1855 – two species
Common name	Scientific name and subspecies	Range	Size and ecology	IUCN status and estimated population
Common eland	T. oryx (Pallas, 1766) Three subspecies: T. o. livingstonei (Livingstone's eland); T. o. oryx (Cape eland); T. o. pattersonianus (East African eland)	Eastern and southern Africa	Size: 200–345 cm (79–136 in) long, plus 50–72 cm (20–28 in) tail Habitat: Forest, savanna, shrubland, and grassland Diet: Shrubs	LC 90,000–110,000
Giant eland	T. derbianus (Gray, 1847) Two subspecies: T. d. derbianus; T. d. gigas	Western and central Africa	Size: 210–345 cm (83–136 in) long, plus 55–70 cm (22–28 in) tail Habitat: Forest and savanna Diet: Leaves, shoots, herbs and fruit, as well as grass	VU 8,400–9,800

Genus Tetracerus – Leach, 1825 – one species
Common name	Scientific name and subspecies	Range	Size and ecology	IUCN status and estimated population
Four-horned antelope	T. quadricornis (Blainville, 1816) Three subspecies: T. q. iodes; T. q. quadricornis; T. q. subquadricornutus	Indian subcontinent	Size: 80–110 cm (31–43 in) long, plus 10–15 cm (4–6 in) tail Habitat: Forest and shrubland Diet: Grass and shrubs	VU 7,000–10,000

Genus Tragelaphus – (Blainville, 1816) – seven species
Common name	Scientific name and subspecies	Range	Size and ecology	IUCN status and estimated population
Bongo	T. eurycerus (Ogilby, 1837)	Western and central Africa	Size: 170–250 cm (67–98 in) long, plus 45–65 cm (18–26 in) tail Habitat: Forest and savanna Diet: Shrubs as well as grass	NT 15,000–25,000
Greater kudu	T. strepsiceros (Pallas, 1766) Three subspecies: T. s. chora; T. s. cottoni; T. s. strepsiceros	Central, eastern, and southern Africa	Size: 180–250 cm (71–98 in) long Habitat: Forest, savanna, shrubland, and desert Diet: Shrubs	LC 300,000–350,000
Harnessed bushbuck	T. scriptus (Pallas, 1766) Eight subspecies: T. s. bor; T. s. decula; T. s. fasciatus; T. s. knutsoni; T. s. meneliki; T. s. ornatus; T. s. scriptus; T. s. sylvaticus	Western and central Africa	Size: 105–150 cm (41–59 in) long, plus 19–25 cm (7–10 in) tail Habitat: Forest, savanna, shrubland, and grassland Diet: Shrubs	LC 1,000,000–1,500,000
Lesser kudu	T. imberbis (Blyth, 1869)	Eastern Africa	Size: 110–175 cm (43–69 in) long, plus 26–30 cm (10–12 in) tail Habitat: Forest, savanna, and shrubland Diet: Tree leaves, shrubs, and herbs	NT 80,000–100,000
Mountain nyala	T. buxtoni (Lydekker, 1910)	Central Ethiopia	Size: 190–260 cm (75–102 in) long Habitat: Forest, shrubland, and grassland Diet: Grass, herbs, and shrubs	EN 1,500–2,500
Nyala	T. angasii Angas, 1849	Southeastern Africa	Size: 132–198 cm (52–78 in) long, plus 35–55 cm (14–22 in) tail Habitat: Forest, savanna, and shrubland Diet: Leaves and fruit as well as grass	LC 20,000–27,500
Sitatunga	T. spekii P. L. Sclater, 1863 Five subspecies: T. s. gratus; T. s. larkenii; T. s. selousi; T. s. spekii; T. s. sylvestris	Central Africa	Size: 115–170 cm (45–67 in) long, plus 18–30 cm (7–12 in) tail Habitat: Forest, savanna, shrubland, grassland, and inland wetlands Diet: Grass, sedges, and shrubs	LC 90,000–120,000

=== Subfamily Caprinae ===
Genus Ammotragus – (Blyth, 1840) – one species
Common name	Scientific name and subspecies	Range	Size and ecology	IUCN status and estimated population
Barbary sheep	A. lervia (Pallas, 1777) Six subspecies: A. l. angusi; A. l. blainei; A. l. fassini; A. l. lervia; A. l. ornatus (Egyptian Barbary sheep); A. l. sahariensis	Northern Africa	Size: 130–165 cm (51–65 in) long, plus 12–25 cm (5–10 in) tail Habitat: Savanna, shrubland, grassland, rocky areas, and desert Diet: Grass, shrubs, and forbs	VU 5,000–10,000

Genus Arabitragus – Ropiquet, Hassanin, 2005 – one species
Common name	Scientific name and subspecies	Range	Size and ecology	IUCN status and estimated population
Arabian tahr	A. jayakari Thomas, 1894	Eastern Arabia	Size: 93–95 cm (37–37 in) long, plus up to 8–10 cm (3–4 in) tail Habitat: Shrubland, rocky areas, and desert Diet: Grass, forbs, shrubs, and trees	EN 2,200–2,300

Genus Budorcas – Hodgson, 1850 – one species
Common name	Scientific name and subspecies	Range	Size and ecology	IUCN status and estimated population
Takin	B. taxicolor Hodgson, 1850 Four subspecies: B. t. bedfordi (golden takin); B. t. taxicolor (Mishmi takin); B. t. tibetana (Sichuan takin); B. t. whitei (Bhutan takin)	Eastern Himalayas	Size: 170–220 cm (67–87 in) long, plus 15 cm (6 in) tail Habitat: Forest, shrubland, and grassland Diet: Grass, bamboo shoots, forbs, and leaves	VU Unknown

Genus Capra – Linnaeus, 1758 – nine species
Common name	Scientific name and subspecies	Range	Size and ecology	IUCN status and estimated population
Alpine ibex	C. ibex Linnaeus, 1758	The Alps	Size: 130–140 cm (51–55 in) long, plus 12–15 cm (5–6 in) tail Habitat: Grassland, and rocky areas Diet: Grass and herbs, as well as woody plants and cryptogams	LC 53,000
East Caucasian tur	C. cylindricornis (Blyth, 1841)	Caucasus Mountains in eastern Europe	Size: 120–165 cm (47–65 in) long, plus 10–14 cm (4–6 in) tail Habitat: Forest, shrubland, grassland, and rocky areas Diet: Grass, trees, and a variety of other plants	NT 23,000
Iberian ibex	C. pyrenaica Schinz, 1838	Iberian Peninsula	Size: 100–140 cm (39–55 in) long, plus 10–15 cm (4–6 in) tail Habitat: Forest, shrubland, and rocky areas Diet: Leaves, acorns, forbs, and grass	LC 50,000
Markhor	C. falconeri (Wagner, 1839) Three subspecies: C. f. falconeri (Astor markhor); C. f. heptneri (Bukharan markhor); C. f. megaceros (Kabul markhor)	Central Asia	Size: 140–185 cm (55–73 in) long, plus 8–14 cm (3–6 in) tail Habitat: Forest, shrubland, and rocky areas Diet: Grass and leaves	NT 5,800
Nubian ibex	C. nubiana F. Cuvier, 1825	Northern Africa and the Middle East	Size: 105–125 cm (41–49 in) long Habitat: Shrubland, rocky areas, and desert Diet: Wide variety of herbaceous and woody plants	VU 4,500
Siberian ibex	C. sibirica (Pallas, 1776)	Central Asia	Size: 130–165 cm (51–65 in) long, plus 10–18 cm (4–7 in) tail Habitat: Forest, shrubland, grassland, rocky areas, and desert Diet: Grass, as well as herbs and shrubs	NT 102,000–150,000
Walia ibex	C. walie Rüppell, 1835	Northeastern Africa	Size: 150–170 cm (59–67 in) long, plus 20–25 cm (8–10 in) tail Habitat: Shrubland, grassland, and rocky areas Diet: Shrubs, herbs, lichens, and grass	CR 250
West Caucasian tur	C. caucasica Güldenstädt, Pallas, 1783 Two subspecies: C. c. caucasica; C. c. severtzovi	Caucasus Mountains in eastern Europe	Size: 120–165 cm (47–65 in) long, plus 10–14 cm (4–6 in) tail Habitat: Forest, shrubland, grassland, and rocky areas Diet: Grass, trees, and a variety of other plants	EN 3,000–4,000
Wild goat	C. aegagrus Erxleben, 1777 Five subspecies: C. a. aegagrus (bezoar ibex); C. a. blythi (Sindh ibex); C. a. chialtanensis (Chiltan ibex); C. a. turcmenica (Turkmen wild goat); C. a. hircus (goat)	Western Asia (worldwide distribution of domestic goat in farming)	Size: 115–170 cm (45–67 in) long Habitat: Forest, shrubland, grassland, rocky areas, and desert Diet: Grass, herbaceous plants, and shrubs, as well as trees	NT 70,000 (about 1 billion used in farming)

Genus Capricornis – Ogilby, 1836 – four species
Common name	Scientific name and subspecies	Range	Size and ecology	IUCN status and estimated population
Japanese serow	C. crispus (Temminck, 1836)	Japan	Size: Around 130 cm (51 in) long Habitat: Forest, shrubland, and grassland Diet: Leaves, shoots, and acorns	LC Unknown
Mainland serow	C. sumatraensis (Bechstein, 1799) Three subspecies: C. s. maritimus (Indochinese serow); C. s. sumatraensis (Sumatran serow); C. s. thar (Himalayan serow)	The Himalayas and southeastern Asia	Size: 140–155 cm (55–61 in) long, plus 8–16 cm (3–6 in) tail Habitat: Forest, shrubland, grassland, and rocky areas Diet: Leaves and twigs	VU Unknown
Red serow	C. rubidus (Blyth, 1863)	Southeastern Asia	Size: 140–155 cm (55–61 in) long Habitat: Forest, shrubland, and rocky areas Diet: Grass, shoots, and leaves	VU Unknown
Taiwan serow	C. swinhoei Gray, 1862	Taiwan	Size: 80–114 cm (31–45 in) long, plus 7–12 cm (3–5 in) tail Habitat: Forest, shrubland, grassland, and rocky areas Diet: Grass and shrubs	LC Unknown

Genus Hemitragus – (Hodgson, 1841) – one species
Common name	Scientific name and subspecies	Range	Size and ecology	IUCN status and estimated population
Himalayan tahr	H. jemlahicus (H. Smith, 1826)	Himalayas	Size: 90–140 cm (35–55 in) long Habitat: Forest, shrubland, grassland, and rocky areas Diet: Herbaceous plants and shrubs, grass, and sedges	NT Unknown

Genus Naemorhedus – H. Smith, 1827 – four species
Common name	Scientific name and subspecies	Range	Size and ecology	IUCN status and estimated population
Chinese goral	N. griseus (Milne-Edwards, 1874) Two subspecies: N. g. evansi; N. g. griseus	Southeastern Asia	Size: 88–118 cm (35–46 in) long, plus 11–20 cm (4–8 in) tail Habitat: Forest, shrubland, and rocky areas Diet: Grass, leaves, twigs, and nuts	NE Unknown
Himalayan goral	N. goral (Hardwicke, 1825) Two subspecies: N. g. bedfordi; N. g. goral	Himalayas	Size: 81–130 cm (32–51 in) long Habitat: Forest, shrubland, grassland, and rocky areas Diet: Grass, leaves, twigs, fruit, and nuts	NT Unknown
Long-tailed goral	N. caudatus (H. Milne-Edwards, 1867)	Eastern Asia	Size: 81–129 cm (32–51 in) long Habitat: Forest, shrubland, grassland, and rocky areas Diet: Grass, herbs, shoots, leaves, nuts, as well as fruit	VU 2,500–10,000
Red goral	N. baileyi Pocock, 1914	Eastern Asia	Size: 93–103 cm (37–41 in) long, plus 7–10 cm (3–4 in) tail Habitat: Forest, shrubland, and rocky areas Diet: Lichens, as well as grass, shoots, leaves, and twigs	VU 7,000–10,000

Genus Nilgiritragus – Ropiquet, Hassanin, 2005 – one species
Common name	Scientific name and subspecies	Range	Size and ecology	IUCN status and estimated population
Nilgiri tahr	N. hylocrius (Ogilby, 1838)	Southern India	Size: 90–140 cm (35–55 in) long, plus 9–12 cm (4–5 in) tail Habitat: Shrubland, grassland, and rocky areas Diet: Grass and forbs	EN 1,800–2,000

Genus Oreamnos – Rafinesque, 1817 – one species
Common name	Scientific name and subspecies	Range	Size and ecology	IUCN status and estimated population
Mountain goat	O. americanus (Blainville, 1816)	Western North America	Size: 120–160 cm (47–63 in) long, plus 8–20 cm (3–8 in) tail Habitat: Forest, shrubland, grassland, and rocky areas Diet: Grass, forbs, sedges, ferns, moss, lichen, twigs, and leaves	LC 48,000–62,000

Genus Ovibos – Blainville, 1816 – one species
Common name	Scientific name and subspecies	Range	Size and ecology	IUCN status and estimated population
Muskox	O. moschatus (Zimmermann, 1780)	The Arctic (reintroduced in blue)	Size: 190–270 cm (75–106 in) long, plus 7–12 cm (3–5 in) tail Habitat: Grassland Diet: Sedges and grass, as well as shrubs and some forbs	LC 127,000

Genus Ovis – Linnaeus, 1758 – seven species
Common name	Scientific name and subspecies	Range	Size and ecology	IUCN status and estimated population
Argali	O. ammon Linnaeus, 1758 Nine subspecies: O. a. ammon (Altai argali); O. a. collium (Karaganda argali); O. a. darwini (Gobi argali); O. a. hodgsonii (Tibetan argali); O. a. jubata (North China argali); O. a. karelini (Tian Shan argali); O. a. nigrimontana (Kara Tau argali); O. a. polii (Marco Polo sheep); O. a. severtzovi (Severtzov argali)	Central and eastern Asia	Size: 120–190 cm (47–75 in) long Habitat: Forest, shrubland, grassland, rocky areas, and desert Diet: Grass, sedges, and some herbs and lichens	NT Unknown
Bighorn sheep	O. canadensis Shaw, 1804 Three subspecies: O. c. canadensis (Rocky Mountain bighorn sheep); O. c. nelsoni (desert bighorn sheep); O. c. sierrae (Sierra Nevada bighorn sheep)	Western North America	Size: 160–180 cm (63–71 in) long Habitat: Grassland, and rocky areas Diet: Grass, as well as forbs and shrubs	LC 49,000
Dall sheep	O. dalli Nelson, 1884 Two subspecies: O. d. dalli; O. d. stonei (Stone sheep)	Northwestern North America	Size: 130–180 cm (51–71 in) long, plus 7–12 cm (3–5 in) tail Habitat: Shrubland, grassland, and rocky areas Diet: Grass and sedges	LC 66,600
Mouflon	O. gmelini Blyth, 1841 Four subspecies: O. g. gmelini (Armenian mouflon); O. g. isphahanica (Esfahan mouflon); O. g. laristanica (Laristan mouflon); O. g. ophion (Cyprus mouflon)	Western Asia	Size: 105–140 cm (41–55 in) long, plus 12–13 cm (5–5 in) tail Habitat: Forest, shrubland, grassland, and rocky areas Diet: Grass and shrubs	NT 26,500
Sheep	O. aries Linnaeus, 1758	Domesticated worldwide	Size: 120–180 cm (47–71 in) long, plus 7–15 cm (3–6 in) tail Habitat: Savanna, grassland, desert, forest, and rocky areas Diet: Grass, as well as a wide variety of vegetation	NE Unknown (about 1.2 billion used in farming)
Snow sheep	O. nivicola Eschscholtz, 1829 Six subspecies: O. n. alleni (Okhotsk sheep); O. n. borealis (Putorana snow sheep); O. n. koriakorum (Koryak snow sheep); O. n. nivicola (Kamchatkan snow sheep); O. n. tschuktschorum (Chukotsk sheep); O. n. zydekkeri (Yakutian sheep)	Eastern Russia	Size: 126–188 cm (50–74 in) long Habitat: Forest, shrubland, grassland, and rocky areas Diet: Grass, as well as lichens, mosses, and willow sprouts	LC Unknown
Urial	O. vignei Blyth, 1841	Central and southern Asia	Size: 120–160 cm (47–63 in) long, plus 11–13 cm (4–5 in) tail Habitat: Forest, shrubland, grassland, and rocky areas Diet: Grass and shrubs	VU 18,000

Genus Pantholops – Hodgson, 1834 – one species
Common name	Scientific name and subspecies	Range	Size and ecology	IUCN status and estimated population
Tibetan antelope	P. hodgsonii (Abel, 1826)	Tibetan Plateau	Size: 120–130 cm (47–51 in) long Habitat: Grassland Diet: Grass and herbs	NT 100,000–150,000

Genus Pseudois – Hodgson, 1846 – one species
Common name	Scientific name and subspecies	Range	Size and ecology	IUCN status and estimated population
Bharal	P. nayaur (Hodgson, 1833)	Himalayas	Size: 120–140 cm (47–55 in) long Habitat: Forest, shrubland, grassland, rocky areas, and desert Diet: Grass, alpine herbs, and lichens	LC 47,000–414,000

Genus Rupicapra – Blainville, 1816 – two species
Common name	Scientific name and subspecies	Range	Size and ecology	IUCN status and estimated population
Chamois	R. rupicapra (Linnaeus, 1758) Seven subspecies: R. r. asiatica (Anatolian chamois); R. r. balcanica (Balkan chamois); R. r. carpatica (Carpathian chamois); R. r. cartusiana (Chartreuse chamois); R. r. caucasica (Caucasian chamois); R. r. rupicapra (Alpine chamois); R. r. tatrica (Tatra chamois)	Europe and western Asia (former range in gray)	Size: 110–135 cm (43–53 in) long Habitat: Forest, shrubland, grassland, and rocky areas Diet: Grass, herbs, tree leaves, buds, shoots, and fungi	LC 300,000
Pyrenean chamois	R. pyrenaica Bonaparte, 1845 Three subspecies: R. p. ornata (Abruzzo chamois); R. p. parva (Cantabrian chamois); R. p. pyrenaica	Southern Europe	Size: 90–130 cm (35–51 in) long, plus 3–4 cm (1–2 in) tail Habitat: Forest, shrubland, grassland, and rocky areas Diet: Herbs and flowers, as well as lichen, moss, and young pine shoots	LC 50,000

=== Subfamily Cephalophinae ===
Genus Cephalophus – H. Smith, 1827 – sixteen species
Common name	Scientific name and subspecies	Range	Size and ecology	IUCN status and estimated population
Abbott's duiker	C. spadix True, 1890	Tanzania	Size: 97–140 cm (38–55 in) long, plus 8–13 cm (3–5 in) tail Habitat: Forest and shrubland Diet: Leaves, fruit, flowers and moss	EN 1,500
Aders's duiker	C. adersi (Thomas, 1918)	Eastern Africa	Size: 66–72 cm (26–28 in) long, plus 9–12 cm (4–5 in) tail Habitat: Forest and shrubland Diet: Leaves, seeds, sprouts, buds, and fruit	VU 14,000
Bay duiker	C. dorsalis Gray, 1846 Two subspecies: C. d. castaneus (eastern bay duiker); C. d. dorsalis (western bay duiker)	Western and southern Africa	Size: 70–100 cm (28–39 in) long Habitat: Forest Diet: Fruit and leaves, as well as birds	NT Unknown
Black duiker	C. niger (Gray, 1846)	Western Africa	Size: 80–90 cm (31–35 in) long, plus 12–14 cm (5–6 in) tail Habitat: Forest Diet: Flowers, leaves, shrubs, grass, fruit, insects, and eggs	LC Unknown
Black-fronted duiker	C. nigrifrons (Gray, 1871) Six subspecies: C. n. fosteri; C. n. hooki; C. n. hypoxanthus; C. n. kivuensis; C. n. nigrifrons; C. n. rubidus (Ruwenzori duiker)	Central Africa	Size: 80–170 cm (31–67 in) long, plus 7–15 cm (3–6 in) tail Habitat: Forest and shrubland Diet: Fruit and leaves	LC Unknown
Brooke's duiker	C. brookei (Thomas, 1903)	Western Africa	Size: About 100 cm (39 in) long, plus 12 cm (5 in) tail Habitat: Forest Diet: Fruit and leaves	VU 5,000
Jentink's duiker	C. jentinki Thomas, 1892	Western Africa	Size: 130–150 cm (51–59 in) long, plus 12–16 cm (5–6 in) tail Habitat: Forest Diet: Fruit, nuts, and tree stems	EN 2,000
Ogilby's duiker	C. ogilbyi (Waterhouse, 1838)	Western Africa	Size: 85–115 cm (33–45 in) long, plus 12–15 cm (5–6 in) tail Habitat: Forest Diet: Fruit and leaves	LC Unknown
Peters's duiker	C. callipygus (Peters, 1876)	Western central Africa	Size: 94–109 cm (37–43 in) long, plus 8–15 cm (3–6 in) tail Habitat: Forest Diet: Fruit and leaves	LC Unknown
Red forest duiker	C. natalensis (Smith, 1834) Two subspecies: C. n. harveyi; C. n. natalensis	Southeastern Africa	Size: 75–87 cm (30–34 in) long, plus 9–14 cm (4–6 in) tail Habitat: Forest and shrubland Diet: Fruit and leaves	LC Unknown
Red-flanked duiker	C. rufilatus (Gray, 1846)	Western and central Africa	Size: 60–80 cm (24–31 in) long Habitat: Forest and savanna Diet: Leaves and fruit, as well as flowers and twigs	LC Unknown
Weyns's duiker	C. weynsi (Thomas, 1901) Three subspecies: C. w. johnstoni; C. w. lestradei; C. w. weynsi	Central Africa	Size: 80–115 cm (31–45 in) long, plus 8–16 cm (3–6 in) tail Habitat: Forest Diet: Fruit and leaves	LC Unknown
White-bellied duiker	C. leucogaster (Gray, 1873) Two subspecies: C. l. arrhenii; C. l. leucogaster	Central Africa	Size: 78–100 cm (31–39 in) long, plus 8–15 cm (3–6 in) tail Habitat: Forest Diet: Fruit, leaves, and flowers	NT Unknown
White-legged duiker	C. crusalbum Grubb, 1978	Western Africa	Size: 85–115 cm (33–45 in) long, plus 12–15 cm (5–6 in) tail Habitat: Forest Diet: Fruit and leaves	NT 13,000
Yellow-backed duiker	C. silvicultor (Afzelius, 1815) Four subspecies: C. s. curticeps; C. s. longiceps; C. s. ruficrista; C. s. silvicultor	Central and western Africa	Size: 115–145 cm (45–57 in) long, plus 11–18 cm (4–7 in) tail Habitat: Forest, savanna, and shrubland Diet: Fruit, as well as leaves, seeds, buds, bark, and shoots	NT Unknown
Zebra duiker	C. zebra (Gray, 1838)	Western Africa	Size: 70–90 cm (28–35 in) long, plus 10–15 cm (4–6 in) tail Habitat: Forest Diet: Fruit and leaves	VU 9,500

Genus Philantomba – Blyth, 1840 – three species
Common name	Scientific name and subspecies	Range	Size and ecology	IUCN status and estimated population
Blue duiker	P. monticola (Thunberg, 1789) Twelve subspecies: P. m. aequatorialis; P. m. anchietae; P. m. bicolor; P. m. congicus; P. m. defriesi; P. m. hecki; P. m. lugens; P. m. melanorheus; P. m. monticola; P. m. musculoides; P. m. simpsoni; P. m. sundevalli	Central and southern Africa	Size: 55–72 cm (22–28 in) long, plus 7–13 cm (3–5 in) tail Habitat: Forest Diet: Fruit, seeds, flowers, and fungi	LC Unknown
Maxwell's duiker	P. maxwellii (H. Smith, 1827) Two subspecies: P. m. danei; P. m. maxwellii	Western Africa	Size: 36–40 cm (14–16 in) long Habitat: Forest and shrubland Diet: Leaves and fruit	LC Unknown
Walter's duiker	P. walteri Colyn, Huselman, Sonet, Oudé, Winters, Natta, Nagy, Verheyen, 2010	Western Africa	Size: Similar to Maxwell's duiker Habitat: Shrubland Diet: Leaves and fruit	DD Unknown

Genus Sylvicapra – Ogilby, 1837 – one species
Common name	Scientific name and subspecies	Range	Size and ecology	IUCN status and estimated population
Common duiker	S. grimmia (Linnaeus, 1758) Thirteen subspecies: S. g. altivallis; S. g. caffra; S. g. campbelliae; S. g. coronata; S. g. grimmia; S. g. hindei; S. g. lobeliarum; S. g. madoqua; S. g. nyansae; S. g. orbicularis; S. g. pallidior; S. g. splendidula; S. g. steinhardti	Sub-Saharan Africa	Size: 70–105 cm (28–41 in) long, plus 10–20 cm (4–8 in) tail Habitat: Forest, savanna, shrubland, grassland, and desert Diet: Variety of foliage, herbs, fruit, seeds, and cultivated crops	LC Unknown

=== Subfamily Hippotraginae ===
Genus Addax – Laurillard, 1841 – one species
Common name	Scientific name and subspecies	Range	Size and ecology	IUCN status and estimated population
Addax	A. nasomaculatus (Blainville, 1816)	Scattered western Africa	Size: 150–170 cm (59–67 in) long, plus 25–35 cm (10–14 in) tail Habitat: Savanna, grassland, and desert Diet: Grass and shrubs	CR 30–90

Genus Hippotragus – Sundevall, 1846 – three species
Common name	Scientific name and subspecies	Range	Size and ecology	IUCN status and estimated population
Bluebuck†	H. leucophaeus (Pallas, 1766)	Southern tip of Africa (former range)	Size: 230–300 cm (91–118 in) long Habitat: Grassland Diet: Grass	EX 0
Roan antelope	H. equinus (Desmarest, 1804) Six subspecies: H. e. bakeri; H. e. cottoni; H. e. equinus; H. e. koba; H. e. langheldi; H. e. scharicus	Sub-Saharan Africa	Size: 190–240 cm (75–94 in) long, plus 37–48 cm (15–19 in) tail Habitat: Forest, savanna, shrubland, and grassland Diet: Grass	LC 50,000–60,000
Sable antelope	H. niger (Harris, 1838) Four subspecies: H. n. kirkii (Zambian sable antelope); H. n. niger (southern sable antelope); H. n. roosevelti (eastern sable antelope); H. n. variani (giant sable antelope)	Southeastern Africa	Size: 190–255 cm (75–100 in) long, plus 40–75 cm (16–30 in) tail Habitat: Forest, savanna, shrubland, and grassland Diet: Grass, as well as forbs and leaves	LC 50,000–60,000

Genus Oryx – Blainville, 1816 – four species
Common name	Scientific name and subspecies	Range	Size and ecology	IUCN status and estimated population
Arabian oryx	O. leucoryx (Pallas, 1777)	Arabian Peninsula	Size: 153–235 cm (60–93 in) long, plus 45–90 cm (18–35 in) tail Habitat: Desert Diet: Grass and shrubs	VU 850
East African oryx	O. beisa (Rüppell, 1835) Two subspecies: O. b. beisa (common beisa oryx); O. b. callotis (fringe-eared oryx)	Eastern Africa	Size: 153–170 cm (60–67 in) long, plus 45–50 cm (18–20 in) tail Habitat: Savanna, shrubland, grassland, and desert Diet: Grass and shrubs, as well as melons, roots, bulbs, and tubers	EN 11,000–13,000
Gemsbok	O. gazella (Linnaeus, 1758)	Southern Africa	Size: 180–195 cm (71–77 in) long Habitat: Savanna, shrubland, grassland, and desert Diet: Grass and shrubs, as well as melons, roots, bulbs, and tubers	LC Unknown
Scimitar oryx	O. dammah (Cretzschmar, 1827)	Reservation in Chad	Size: 190–220 cm (75–87 in) long, plus 45–60 cm (18–24 in) tail Habitat: Savanna, shrubland, and desert Diet: Grass, herbs, roots, and buds, as well as fruit and vegetables	EN 150

=== Subfamily Nesotraginae ===
Genus Nesotragus – von Düben, 1846 – two species
Common name	Scientific name and subspecies	Range	Size and ecology	IUCN status and estimated population
Bates's pygmy antelope	N. batesi (Winton, 1903)	Central Africa	Size: 50–58 cm (20–23 in) long, plus 4–5 cm (2–2 in) tail Habitat: Forest Diet: Leaves	LC Unknown
Suni	N. moschatus von Dueben, 1846 Four subspecies: N. m. kirchenpaueri; N. m. livingstonianus; N. m. moschatus; N. m. zuluensis	Eastern Africa	Size: 57–62 cm (22–24 in) long Habitat: Forest and shrubland Diet: Leaves	LC Unknown

=== Subfamily Oreotraginae ===
Genus Oreotragus – A. Smith, 1834 – one species
Common name	Scientific name and subspecies	Range	Size and ecology	IUCN status and estimated population
Klipspringer	O. oreotragus (Zimmermann, 1783) Five subspecies: O. o. aceratos; O. o. oreotragus; O. o. saltatrixoides; O. o. stevensoni; O. o. tyleri	Southern and Eastern Africa	Size: 75–115 cm (30–45 in) long Habitat: Savanna, shrubland, rocky areas, and desert Diet: Shrubs	LC Unknown

=== Subfamily Reduncinae ===
Genus Kobus – Smith, 1840 – five species
Common name	Scientific name and subspecies	Range	Size and ecology	IUCN status and estimated population
Kob	K. kob (Erxleben, 1777) Three subspecies: K. k. kob (Buffon's kob); K. k. leucotis (white-eared kob); K. k. thomasi (Ugandan kob)	Central and western Africa	Size: 160–180 cm (63–71 in) long, plus 10–15 cm (4–6 in) tail Habitat: Savanna, shrubland, grassland, and inland wetlands Diet: Grass	LC 500,000–1,000,000
Lechwe	K. leche Gray, 1850 Four subspecies: K. l. kafuensis (Kafue lechwe); K. l. leche (red lechwe)†; K. l. robertsi (Roberts' lechwe); K. l. smithemani (black lechwe)	Scattered southern Africa	Size: 130–180 cm (51–71 in) long, plus 30–45 cm (12–18 in) tail Habitat: Forest, grassland, and inland wetlands Diet: Floodplain and aquatic grass	NT Unknown
Nile lechwe	K. megaceros (Fitzinger, 1855)	South Sudan and Ethiopia	Size: 130–180 cm (51–71 in) long, plus 45–50 cm (18–20 in) tail Habitat: Grassland and inland wetlands Diet: Grass and water plants	EN Unknown
Puku	K. vardonii (Livingstone, 1857) Two subspecies: K. v. senganus; K. v. vardonii	Scattered south-central Africa	Size: 126–142 cm (50–56 in) long Habitat: Savanna, grassland, and inland wetlands Diet: Grass	NT Unknown
Waterbuck	K. ellipsiprymnus (Ogilby, 1833) Thirteen subspecies: K. e. adolfifriderici; K. e. annectens; K. e. crawshayi (Crawshay defassa waterbuck); K. e. defassa; K. e. ellipsiprymnus; K. e. harnieri; K. e. kondensis; K. e. pallidus; K. e. penricei (Angolan defassa waterbuck); K. e. thikae; K. e. tjaederi; K. e. tschadensis; K. e. unctuosus	Sub-Saharan Africa (ellipsiprymnus, kondensis, pallidus, and thikae in yellow)	Size: 177–235 cm (70–93 in) long Habitat: Forest, savanna, shrubland, and grassland Diet: Grass and shrubs	LC Unknown

Genus Pelea – Gray, 1851 – one species
Common name	Scientific name and subspecies	Range	Size and ecology	IUCN status and estimated population
Grey rhebok	P. capreolus (Forster, 1790)	Southern Africa	Size: 115–125 cm (45–49 in) long Habitat: Savanna and grassland Diet: Shrubs and forbs	NT Unknown

Genus Redunca – H. Smith, 1827 – three species
Common name	Scientific name and subspecies	Range	Size and ecology	IUCN status and estimated population
Bohor reedbuck	R. redunca (Pallas, 1767) Seven subspecies: R. r. bohor (Abyssinian bohor reedbuck); R. r. cottoni; R. r. nigeriensis; R. r. redunca; R. r. wardi	Central Africa	Size: 100–135 cm (39–53 in) long Habitat: Savanna, shrubland, and grassland Diet: Grass	LC Unknown
Mountain reedbuck	R. fulvorufula (Afzelius, 1815) Three subspecies: R. f. adamauae (Adamawa mountain reedbuck); R. f. chanleri (Chanler's mountain reedbuck); R. f. fulvorufula (southern mountain reedbuck)	Separated central, eastern, and southern Africa	Size: 100–124 cm (39–49 in) long, plus 13–20 cm (5–8 in) tail Habitat: Shrubland, grassland, and rocky areas Diet: Grass	EN Unknown
Southern reedbuck	R. arundinum (Boddaert, 1785)	Southern Africa	Size: 134–167 cm (53–66 in) long Habitat: Savanna, shrubland, grassland, and inland wetlands Diet: Grass, as well as herbs and shrubs	LC Unknown

== Sources ==
- Castelló, José R. (2016). Bovids of the World: Antelopes, Gazelles, Cattle, Goats, Sheep, and Relatives. Princeton University Press. ISBN 978-0-691-16717-6.
- Harris, Tim (2018). The Encyclopedia of Animals. Chartwell Books. ISBN 978-0-7858-3646-9.
- Kingdon, Jonathan (2013). The Kingdon Field Guide to African Mammals (1st ed.). Bloomsbury Publishing. ISBN 978-1-4081-7481-4.
- Kingdon, Jonathan (2020). The Kingdon Pocket Guide to African Mammals (2nd ed.). Bloomsbury Publishing. ISBN 978-1-4729-8320-6.
- Smith, Andrew T.; Xie, Yan, eds. (2013). Mammals of China. Princeton University Press. ISBN 978-1-4008-4688-7.
