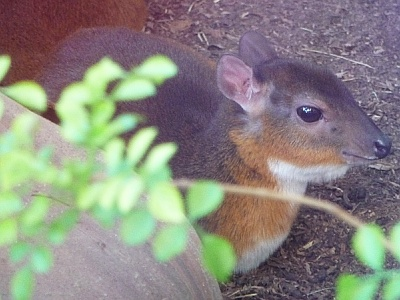
- Individual at the San Diego Zoo

Conservation status
- Least Concern (IUCN 3.1)

Scientific classification
- Kingdom: Animalia
- Phylum: Chordata
- Class: Mammalia
- Infraclass: Placentalia
- Order: Artiodactyla
- Family: Bovidae
- Subfamily: Antilopinae
- Genus: Neotragus
- Species: N. pygmaeus

Binomial name
- Neotragus pygmaeus (Linnaeus, 1758)
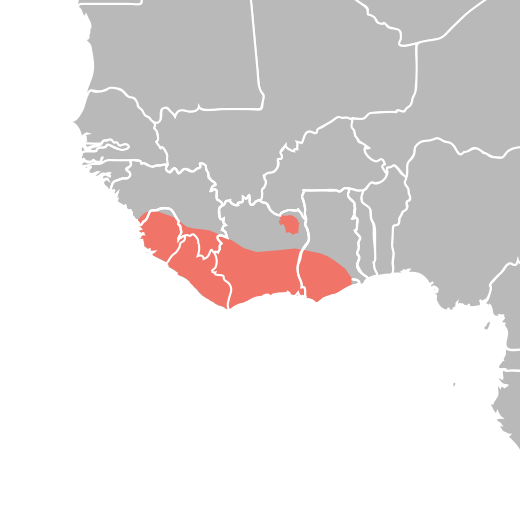
- Neotragus pygmaeus distribution

Synonyms
- Capra pygmaea Linnaeus, 1758; Antilope regia Erxleben, 1777; Antilope opinigera Lesson, 1827; Moschus pygmaeus Linnaeus, 1766; Nanotragus perpusillus Gray, 1851

= Royal antelope =

Species of mammal

The royal antelope (Neotragus pygmaeus) is a West African antelope recognized as the world's smallest. It was first described by Swedish zoologist Carl Linnaeus in 1758. It stands up to merely 25 cm (10 in) at the shoulder and weighs 2.5–3 kg (5.5–6.6 lb). A characteristic feature is the long and slender legs, with the hindlegs twice as long as the forelegs. Horns are possessed only by males; the short, smooth, spiky horns measure 2.5–3 cm (0.98–1.18 in) and bend backward. The soft coat is reddish to golden brown, in sharp contrast with the white ventral parts. In comparison to Bates's pygmy antelope, the royal antelope has a longer muzzle, broader lips, a smaller mouth and smaller cheek muscles.

Typically nocturnal (active at night), the royal antelope exhibits remarkable alertness. Territories are marked with dung. An herbivore, the royal antelope prefers small quantities of fresh foliage and shoots; fruits and fungi may be taken occasionally. Like other neotragines, the royal antelope is monogamous. Both sexes can become sexually mature by as early as six months. Births have been reported in November and December. A single, delicate young is born after an unknown gestational period.

The royal antelope prefers areas with fresh and dense growth of shrubs and other plants. It inhabits the warm, moist lowland forests prevalent in western African countries such as Côte d'Ivoire, Ghana, Guinea, Liberia and Sierra Leone. The royal antelope has been categorized as Least Concern by the International Union for the Conservation of Nature and Natural Resources (IUCN). The population is feared to be declining due to habitat deterioration and expanding human settlement. A significant threat to the survival of this antelope is hunting for bushmeat.

== Taxonomy and etymology ==
The vernacular name "royal antelope" is based on a statement made by Willem Bosman, a merchant associated with the Dutch West India Company, that the antelope was called "the king of the harts" (i.e., the king of the antelope) by locals.

The scientific name is Neotragus pygmaeus /niːˈɒtrəɡəs pɪɡˈmiːəs/. It is placed in the genus Neotragus and the family Bovidae. It was first described by Swedish zoologist Carl Linnaeus in the tenth edition of Systema Naturae (1758). German zoologist Peter Simon Pallas recognised two species – Tragulus pygmaeus and Antilope pygmaea. However, both of them were found to have the same type, the royal antelope. Hence these are treated as synonyms for N. pygmaeus.

The generic name Neotragus consists of two Greek roots: νέος (néos), "new", and τράγος (trágos), "he-goat", while the specific name pygmaeus comes from the Greek πυγμαῖος (pugmaîos), "pygmy, fist-sized".

The tribe Neotragini comprises a variety of dwarf antelopes apart from Neotragus – these include Dorcatragus (beira), Ourebia (oribi), Madoqua (dik dik), Oreotragus (klipspringer) and Raphicerus. The tribe has been shown to be paraphyletic. A 2014 phylogenetic analysis based on cytochrome b sequences and linear skull measurements showed polyphyly in Neotragus. The royal antelope is likely to have had an ancestor in common with the klipspringer and duikers (subfamily Cephalophinae). The genus Neotragus was formerly confused with the distantly related pygmy antelope genus Nesotragus (von Düben, 1846), from Greek νῆσος (nêsos), "island".

== Description ==
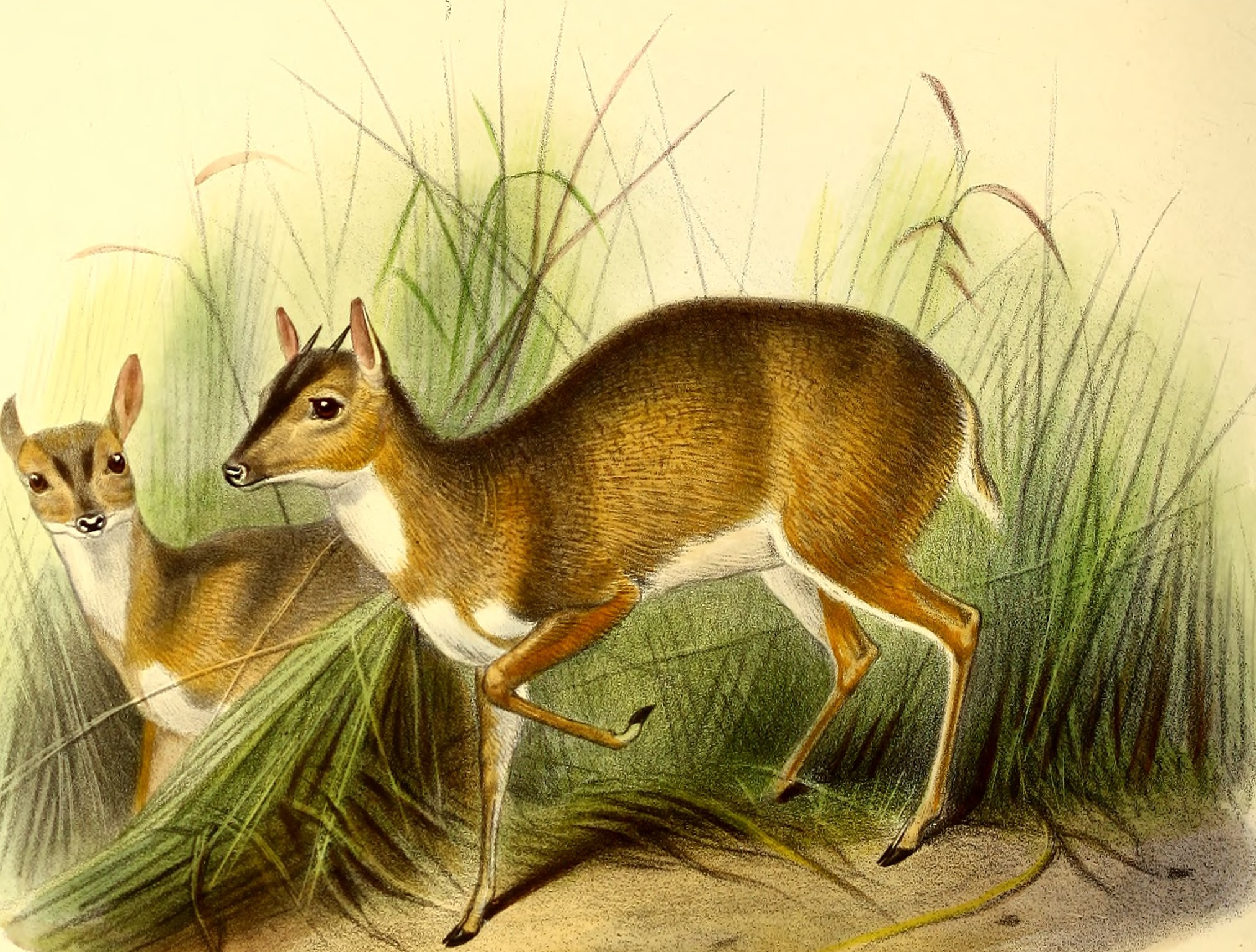
An illustration of the royal antelope from The Book of Antelopes (1894)

The royal antelope is the smallest antelope and ruminant in the world. It is also the smallest African ungulate, followed by Bates's pygmy antelope (Nesotragus batesi). It is also the smallest of all bovines. The royal antelope reaches merely 25 cm (9.8 in) at the shoulder and weighs 2.5–3 kg (5.5–6.6 lb). The head and body length is typically 40 cm (16 in). A characteristic feature is the long and slender legs, with the hindlegs twice as long as the forelegs – a remarkable similarity to a hare. The thin tail, 5–8 cm (2.0–3.1 in) long, is white on the underside, ending in a white tuft. The species is sexually dimorphic, with females being larger than males. Only males possess horns, these being short, smooth, ventrally reflexed spikes measuring 2.5–3 cm (1.0–1.2 in) long.

The soft coat is reddish to golden brown, in sharp contrast with the white ventral parts. A brown band runs across the chest, and a distinct rufous collar can be observed on the neck. The chin and the medial surfaces of the legs are also white. The face is characterised by large, round dark brown eyes, small translucent ears, a slim muzzle, and a large grayish pink rhinarium. In comparison to Bates's pygmy antelope, the royal antelope has a longer muzzle, broader lips, a smaller mouth and smaller cheek muscles.

== Ecology and behavior ==
The royal antelope exhibits remarkable alertness, and consequently little is known about its behaviour. The animal will immediately seek cover if alarmed and flees as soon as the danger is very close. It can move swiftly, either by sprinting fast with the body low to the ground, or through strong leaps powered by the large, well-muscled hindlegs. It can cover 2.8 m (9.2 ft) in a single leap, and rise as high as 55 centimetres (22 in) above the ground. It is typically nocturnal (active at night), though activity may also be observed during the day. It generally rests or ruminates during the day. Territories are marked with dung. The reduced size of the preorbital glands, which are used for scent-marking, could indicate that marking behavior is not very prominent in this antelope.

=== Diet ===
A herbivore, the royal antelope prefers small quantities of fresh foliage and shoots; fruits and fungi may be taken occasionally. Though the antelope is considered to be nocturnal, zoologist Jonathan Kingdon holds that feeding occurs throughout the day, though some foraging may also be observed at night. In comparison to Bates's pygmy antelope, the royal antelope has a longer muzzle, broader lips, a smaller mouth and smaller cheek muscles. These features do not allow complete digestion of lignified growth. Individuals may often move into new locations foraging for fresh growth.

=== Reproduction ===
Like other neotragines, the royal antelope is monogamous, though polygamy has been occasionally observed. Individuals of both sexes have been known to reach sexual maturity by six months of age. Births have been reported in November and December. Typically a single, delicate offspring is born after an unknown gestational period, weighing 0.8–1 kg (1.8–2.2 lb) – nearly a third of an adult's weight. Young appear similar to adults in coloration. The maximum lifespan of a captive royal antelope was estimated at six years and eight months by a 1993 study.

== Habitat and distribution ==
The royal antelope prefers areas with fresh and dense growth of shrubs and other plants. It inhabits the warm, moist lowland forests prevalent in western African countries such as Côte d'Ivoire, Ghana, Guinea, Liberia and Sierra Leone. The animal's habitat also includes forest fringes and secondary forests. Its geographic range extends eastward from the Kounounkan Massif in southwestern Guinea through Sierra Leone, Liberia and Côte d'Ivoire to the Volta River in Ghana. The royal antelope may also be found in the region north to the forested areas of western Africa, which is marked by the interface of forest and savannah habitats.

== Threats and conservation ==
The royal antelope has been categorized as Least Concern by the International Union for the Conservation of Nature and Natural Resources (IUCN). In 1999, the IUCN SSC Antelope Specialist Group estimated the total population to be about 62,000; however, this is likely to be an underestimate. The populations are thought to be declining due to habitat deterioration and expanding human settlement. A significant threat to the survival of this antelope is hunting for bushmeat; it is seldom hunted in Sierra Leone and Liberia, whereas it is a major source of bushmeat in Côte d'Ivoire. Protected areas where the royal antelope occurs include the Tai National Park, Haut Bandama Fauna and Flora Reserve and Mabi-Yaya Classified Forest (Côte d'Ivoire); Kakum National Park and Assin-Attandanso Game Production Reserve (Ghana); Ziama and Diecke Forest Reserves (Guinea); Tiwai Island and Gola Rainforest National Park (Sierra Leone).
