= Haut Bandama Fauna and Flora Reserve =

Coordinates: 8°25′53.84″N 5°24′18.98″W

- IUCN category Ia (strict nature reserve)

The Haut Bandama Fauna and Flora Reserve is found in Ivory Coast, West Africa. It was established in 1973 and covers 123 km^{2}.

According to Marchesi et al. 1995, the estimated total number of chimpanzees in this reserve is 300 individuals.
