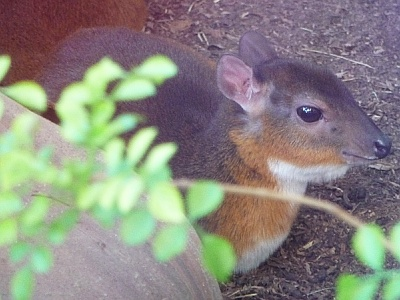
- Royal antelope (Neotragus pygmaeus)

Scientific classification
- Kingdom: Animalia
- Phylum: Chordata
- Class: Mammalia
- Infraclass: Placentalia
- Order: Artiodactyla
- Family: Bovidae
- Subfamily: Antilopinae
- Tribe: Neotragini
- Genus: Neotragus; Hamilton Smith, 1827

Species
- Neotragus pygmaeus
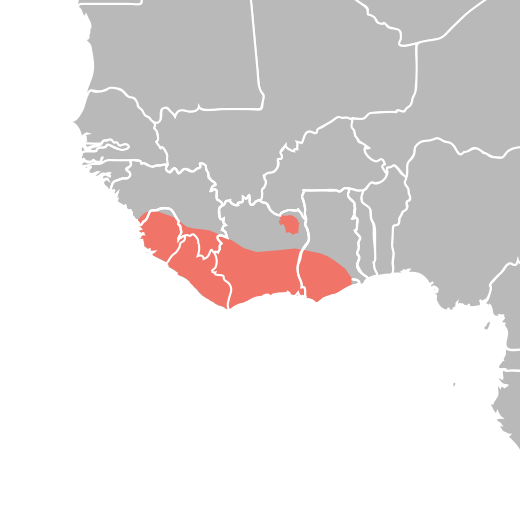
- Neotragus distribution

= Neotragus =

Genus of mammals

Neotragus is a genus of dwarf antelope, native to Africa. The genus includes only a single species without any dispute, namely Neotragus pygmaeus. This species, the royal antelope, is the smallest antelope in the world, usually weighing around 5 to 7 pounds. They live in conditions that are warm and moist and are found in the tropical forests of Western Africa. The royal antelope's diet consists of high-nutrient food sources, such as leaves, flowers, plants, fruits, and the growing tips of shoots. Recent nucleic acid studies now suggest that the other two species formerly included in the genus are not closely related, and should be assigned to the genus Nesotragus. Members of the Nesotragus genus are the only surviving members of the subfamily Nesotraginae or tribe Nesotragini and are more closely related to the impala, while the royal antelope is still considered a member of the subfamily Antilopinae or tribe Antilopini.
