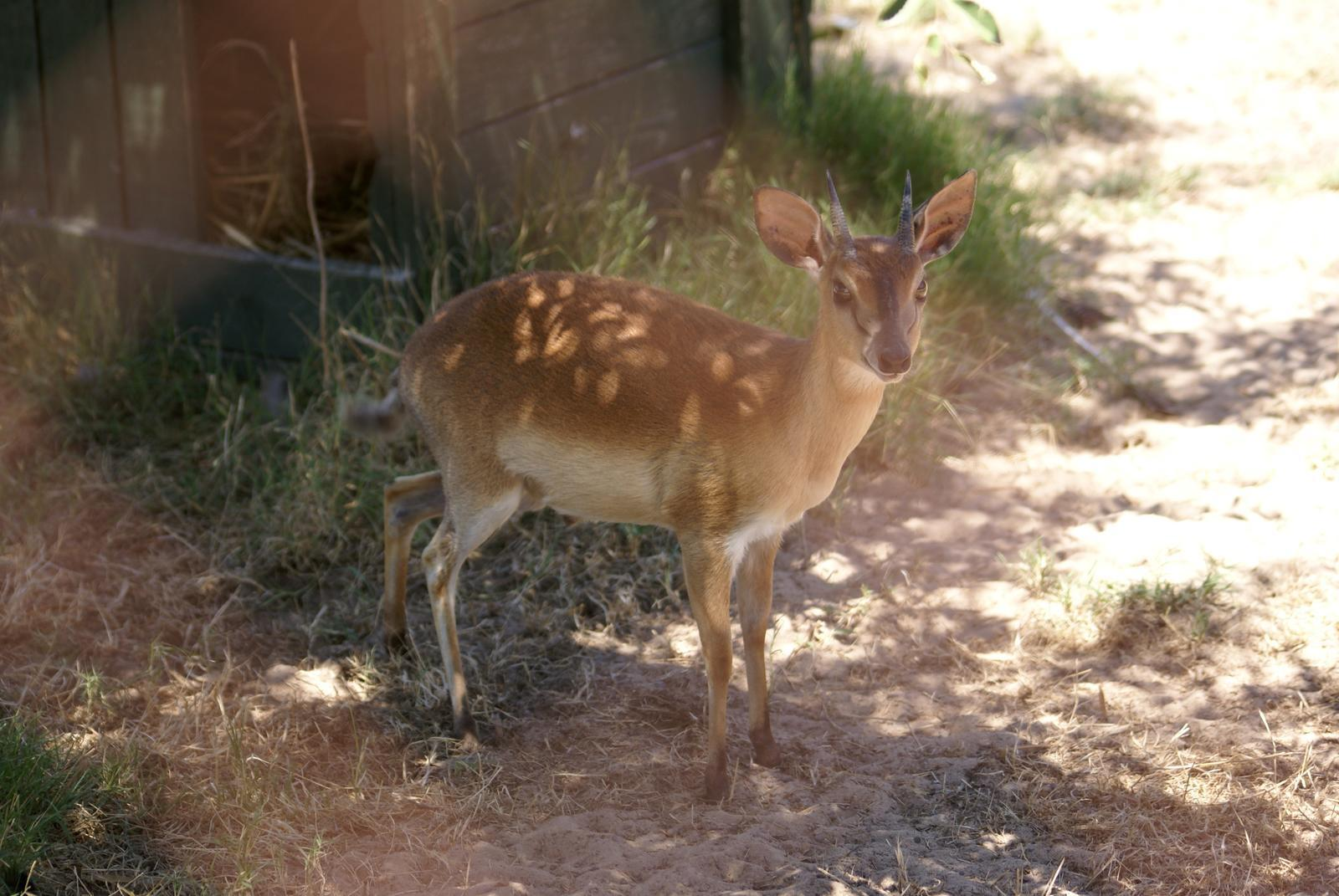
- Suni (Nesotragus moschatus) in Tygerberg Zoo, Cape Town, South Africa

Scientific classification
- Kingdom: Animalia
- Phylum: Chordata
- Class: Mammalia
- Infraclass: Placentalia
- Order: Artiodactyla
- Family: Bovidae
- Subfamily: Nesotraginae
- Genus: Nesotragus von Düben (de), 1846

Species
- Nesotragus batesi; Nesotragus moschatus

= Nesotragus =

Genus of mammals

Nesotragus /nəˈsɒtrəɡəs/ is a genus of dwarf antelope comprising two species, endemic to Africa, and formerly but incorrectly considered a synonym of the similarly named genus Neotragus. Recent nucleic acid studies demonstrate that the two species of Nesotragus are not closely related to the genus Neotragus. Members of the Nesotragus are the only members of the subfamily Nesotraginae or tribe Nesotragini and are more closely related to the impala, while the royal antelope remains a member of the subfamily Antilopinae or tribe Antilopini. The genus name comes from Ancient Greek νῆσος (nêsos), meaning "island", and τράγος (trágos), meaning "he-goat", and thus, "island goat", apparently referring to the antelope species' habitat in wet rainforests.
