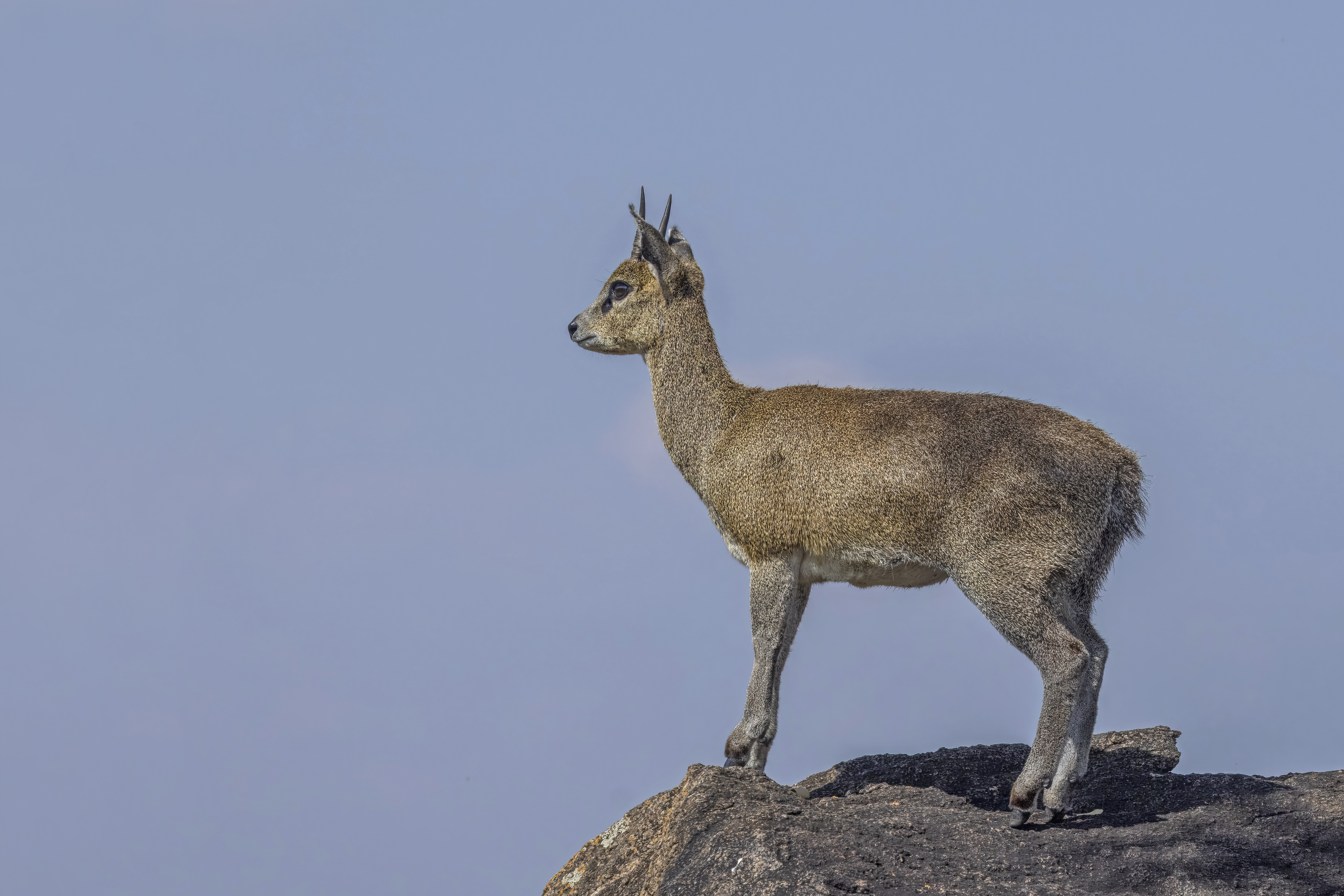
- male O. o. schillingsi Serengeti National Park, Tanzania

Conservation status
- Least Concern (IUCN 3.1)

Scientific classification
- Kingdom: Animalia
- Phylum: Chordata
- Class: Mammalia
- Order: Artiodactyla
- Family: Bovidae
- Subfamily: Oreotraginae; Pocock, 1910
- Genus: Oreotragus; A. Smith, 1834
- Species: O. oreotragus

Binomial name
- Oreotragus oreotragus (Zimmermann, 1783)

Subspecies
- See text
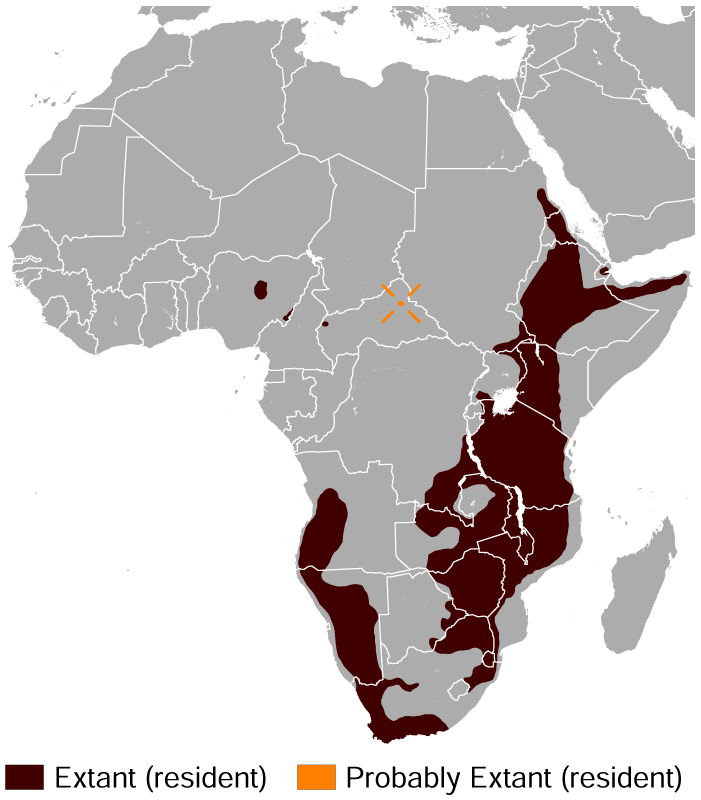
- Klipspringer range

Synonyms
- List: Antilope oreotragus Zimmermann, 1783; Oreotragus cunenensis Zukowsky, 1924; Oreotragus hyatti Hinton, 1921; Oreotragus klippspringer (Daudin, 1802); Oreotragus major Wells, 1951; Oreotragus saltator (Boddaert, 1785); Oreotragus saltatricoides Neumann, 1902; Oreotragus saltatrixoides (Temminck, 1853); Oreotragus steinhardti Zukowsky, 1924; Oreotragus typicus A. Smith, 1834; Palaeotragiscus longiceps Broom, 1934

= Klipspringer =

Species of mammal

The klipspringer (/ˈklɪpˌsprɪŋər/; Oreotragus oreotragus) is a small antelope found in eastern and southern Africa. The sole member of its genus and subfamily/tribe, the klipspringer was first described by German zoologist Eberhard August Wilhelm von Zimmermann in 1783. The klipspringer is a small, sturdy antelope; it reaches 43–60 centimetres (17–23 1/2 inches) at the shoulder and weighs from 8 to 18 kilograms (18 to 40 pounds). The coat of the klipspringer, yellowish gray to reddish brown, acts as an efficient camouflage in its rocky habitat. Unlike most other antelopes, the klipspringer has a thick and coarse coat with hollow, brittle hairs. The horns, short and spiky, typically measure 7.5–9 cm (3–3 1/2 in).

Typically nocturnal, the klipspringer rests during the middle of the day and late at night. A gregarious animal, the klipspringer is monogamous to a much greater extent than other antelopes; individuals of opposite sexes exhibit long-term to lifelong pair bonding. The mates tend to stay as close as within 5 m (16 ft) of each other at most times. Males form territories, 7.5–49 hectares (18 1/2–121 acres), in which they stay with their partners and offspring. Primarily a browser, the klipspringer prefers young plants, fruits and flowers. Gestation lasts around six months, following which a single calf is born; births peak from spring to early summer. The calf leaves its mother when it turns a year old.

The klipspringer inhabits places characterised by rocky terrain and sparse vegetation. Its range extends from northeastern Sudan, Eritrea, Somaliland and Ethiopia in the east to South Africa in the south, and along coastal Angola and Namibia. The International Union for the Conservation of Nature and Natural Resources (IUCN) classifies the klipspringer as Least Concern. There are no major threats to the survival of the klipspringer, as its habitat is inaccessible and unfavourable for hunting. Significant numbers occur on private farmlands. As of 2008, nearly 25% of the populations occur in protected areas throughout its range.

== Taxonomy and etymology ==
The scientific name of the klipspringer is Oreotragus oreotragus /ˌɔːriˈɒtrəɡəs/, from Greek ὄρος (óros), "mountain", and τράγος (trágos), "he-goat". It is the sole member of the genus Oreotragus and subfamily Oreotraginae or tribe Oreotragini, and is classified under the family Bovidae. The species was first described by German zoologist Eberhard August Wilhelm von Zimmermann in 1783, who gave it the scientific name Antilope oreotragus, and it was only given its own separate genus in 1834. The vernacular name "klipspringer" is a compound of the Afrikaans words klip ("rock") and springer ("leaper"). Another name for this antelope is "klipbok".

In 1934, South African paleontologist Robert Broom studied a fossilized right maxillary bone from the cave deposits of Taung, South Africa, and believed they represent an extinct genus and species that lived during the Pliocene or Pleistocene epochs, which he assigned the name Palaeotragiscus longiceps. Later in 1952, another South African paleontologist, Lawrence H. Wells, described an antelope skull found five years earlier in Swartkrans, and believed it represented a prehistoric species related to the klipspringer. He named this species Oreotragus major, believing it was distinguished from the modern klipspringer by its larger size. However, both Palaeotragiscus longiceps and Oreotragus major were later determined not to differ from the modern klipspringer in any significant aspects, so they are now considered to be junior synonyms of Oreotragus oreotragus.

A 2012 phylogenetic study showed that the klipspringer is closely related to Kirk's dik-dik (Madoqua kirkii) and the suni (Neotragus moschatus). The klipspringer evolved nearly 14 million years ago. The cladogram below is based on this study.

- - - Tragelaphus
    - - Suni (Neotragus moschatus)
      - - Klipspringer (Oreotragus oreotragus)
        - - Kirk's dik-dik (Madoqua kirkii)
          - - Cephalophus
            - Philantomba

As many as 11 subspecies have been identified, though zoologists Colin Groves and Peter Grubb treat a few of them as independent species in a 2011 publication:

- O. o. aceratos Noack, 1899 : Noack's or southern Tanzanian klipspringer. Occurs in eastern and southern Africa, between rivers Rufiji and Zambezi.
- O. o. aureus Heller, 1913 : Golden klipspringer. Occurs in Kenya.
- O. o. centralis Hinton, 1921 : Zambian klipspringer. Occurs in central and southern Africa.
- O. o. oreotragus (Zimmermann, 1783) : Cape klipspringer. Occurs in the Cape of Good Hope, South Africa.
- O. o. porteousi Lydekker, 1911 : Occurs in central Africa.
- O. o. saltatrixoides (Temminck, 1853) : Ethiopian klipspringer. Occurs in the highlands of Ethiopia.
- O. o. schillingsi Neumann, 1902 : Maasai klipspringer. Occurs in eastern Africa.
- O. o. somalicus Neumann, 1902 : Somali klipspringer. Occurs in northern Somalia.
- O. o. stevensoni Roberts, 1946 : Stevenson's klipspringer. Occurs in western Zimbabwe.
- O. o. transvaalensis Roberts, 1917 : Transvaal klipspringer. Occurs in South African highlands and Drakensberg.
- O. o. tyleri Hinton, 1921 : Angolan klipspringer. Occurs in Namibia.

== Description ==
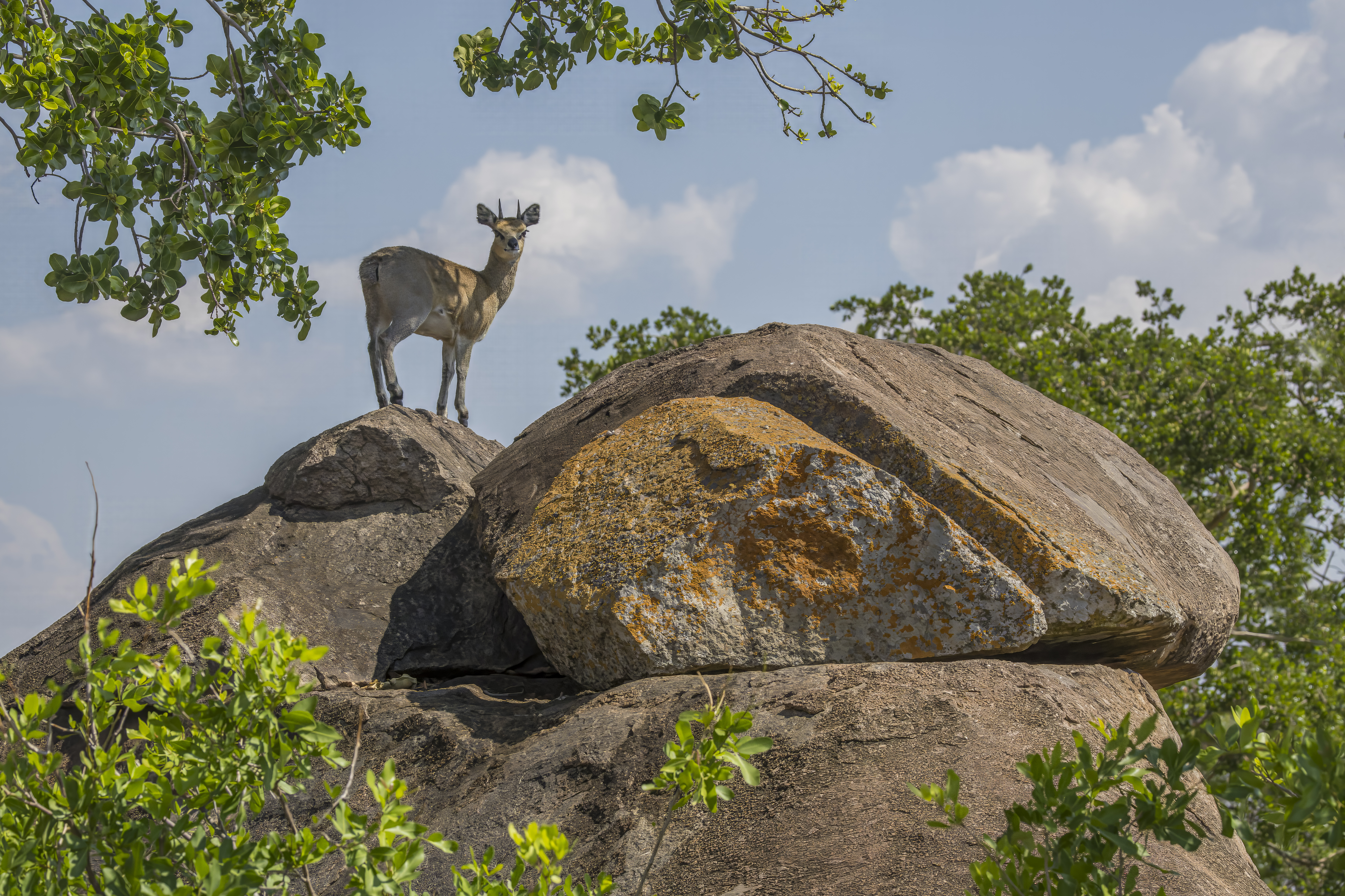
male on rocky outcrop on a kopje in the Serengeti

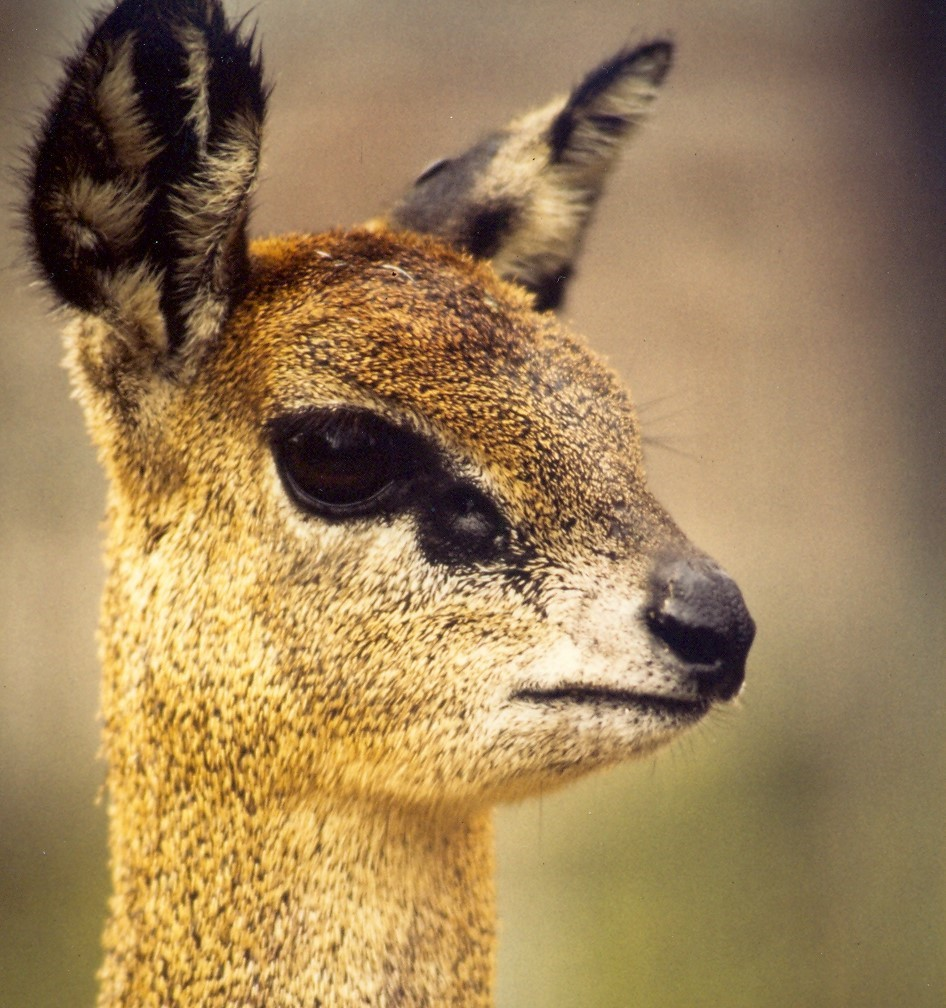
Head of female

The klipspringer is a small, sturdy antelope reaching 43–60 cm (17–23 1/2 in) at the shoulder. The head-and-body length is typically between 75 and 115 cm (30 and 45 in). It weighs from 8 to 18 kg (18 to 40 lb). The klipspringer is sexually dimorphic; females are slightly larger and heavier than the males. The tail measures 6.5–10.5 cm (2 1/2–4 1/4 in). Prominent facial features include the brown forehead, short ears marked with black, prominent preorbital glands near the eyes, and white lips and chin. The horns, short and spiky, present only on males, typically measure 7.5–9 cm (3–3 1/2 in); the maximum recorded horn length is 15.9 cm (6 1/4 in).

The coat of the klipspringer, yellowish gray to reddish brown, acts as an efficient camouflage in its rocky habitat; the underbelly is white. Unlike most other antelopes, the klipspringer has a thick and coarse coat with hollow, brittle hairs. The incisors might even get damaged by the hairs while grooming. However, the coat is a significant adaptation that saves the animal during steep falls and provides effective insulation in the extreme climates characteristic of its mountain habitat. A study showed that ticks occur in larger numbers on the underbelly, where the hair is less coarse. The hair often turns erect, especially if the animal is ill or if its temperature increases. Another feature unique to the klipspringer is its gait; it walks on the tips of its cylindrical, blunt hooves. This enhances the grip on the ground, enabling the animal to deftly climb and jump over rocky surfaces.

The subspecies vary in coat colour – from golden yellow in the Cape klipspringer, Ethiopian klipspringer, golden klipspringer and Transvaal klipspringer to ochre or rufous in the Maasai klipspringer, Stevenson's klipspringer and Zambian klipspringer. Cape klipspringer populations tend to have the largest males, while Maasai klipspringer exhibit the largest females.

== Ecology and behaviour ==
Typically nocturnal (active mainly at night), the klipspringer rests during the midday and at late night; the animal tends to be more active on moonlit nights. It basks in the morning sunlight to warm itself. A gregarious animal, the klipspringer, like the dik-diks and the oribi, exhibits monogamy to a much greater extent than other antelopes; individuals of opposite sexes form pairs that might last until one dies. The mates tend to stay as close as within 5 m (16 ft) of each other at most times; for instance, they take turns at keeping a lookout for predators while the other feeds, and face any danger together. The klipspringer will hop a few metres away from the danger. Other social groups include small family herds of eight or more members or solitary individuals. Klipspringer greet one another by rubbing cheeks at social meetings.

Males form territories, 7.5–49 hectares (18 1/2–121 acres) large (the size depends on rainfall patterns), in which they stay with their partners and offspring. Males are generally more vigilant than females. Klipspringer form large dung heaps, nearly 1 m (3 ft 3 in) across and 10 cm (4 in) deep, at the borders of territories; another form of marking is the secretion of a thick, black substance, measuring 5 mm (1/4 in) across, from the preorbital glands onto vegetation and rocks in the territories. A study revealed that the tick Ixodes neitzi detects and aggregates on twigs marked by the klipspringer. Another study showed that plants near the borders with neighbouring territories are particularly preferred for marking. The main vocalisation is a shrill whistle, given out by the klipspringer pair in a duet, as a means of communication or anti-predator response. Predators include the yellow baboon, black-backed jackal, caracal, crowned eagle, leopard, martial eagle, serval, spotted hyena and Verreaux's eagle. Birds such as familiar chats, pale-winged starlings, red-winged starlings and yellow-bellied bulbuls have been observed feeding on ectoparasites of klipspringer.

=== Diet ===
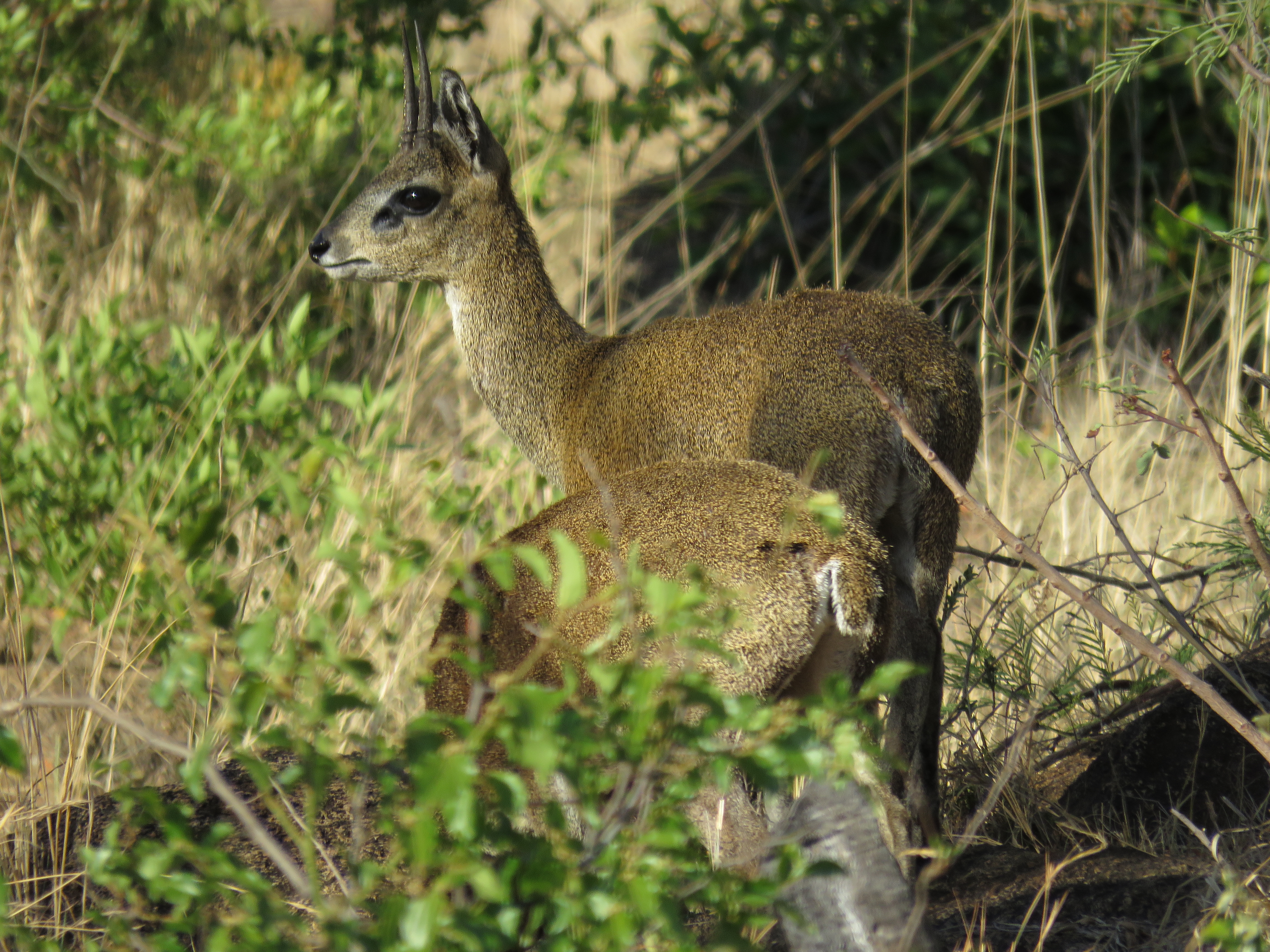
Klipspringers demonstrating typical lookout (rear) and feeding (front) pair behaviour

Primarily a browser, the klipspringer prefers young plants, fruits and flowers. Grasses, eaten mainly in the wet season, form a minor portion of the diet. Some plants, such as Vellozia, may be preferred seasonally. Klipspringer depend mainly on succulent plants, and not on water bodies, to meet their water requirement. They can stand on their hindlegs to reach tall branches up to 1.2 m (3 ft 11 in) above the ground; some individuals in Namibia were observed climbing Faidherbia albida trees up to a height of 5.4 m (17 ft 9 in).

=== Reproduction ===
The klipspringer is a seasonal breeder; the time when mating occurs varies geographically. Females become sexually mature by the time they are a year old; males take slightly longer to mature. Mating behaviour has not been extensively observed. Gestation lasts around six months, following which a single calf, weighing slightly more than 1 kg (2 lb), is born; births peak from spring to early summer. Births take place in dense vegetation. The newborn is carefully hidden for up to three months to protect it from the view of predators; the mother suckles it three to four times a day, the visits gradually lengthen as the offspring grows. Males are protective of their offspring, keeping a watch for other males and predators. The calf is weaned at four to five months, and leaves its mother when it turns a year old. The klipspringer lives for around 15 years.

== Habitat and distribution ==
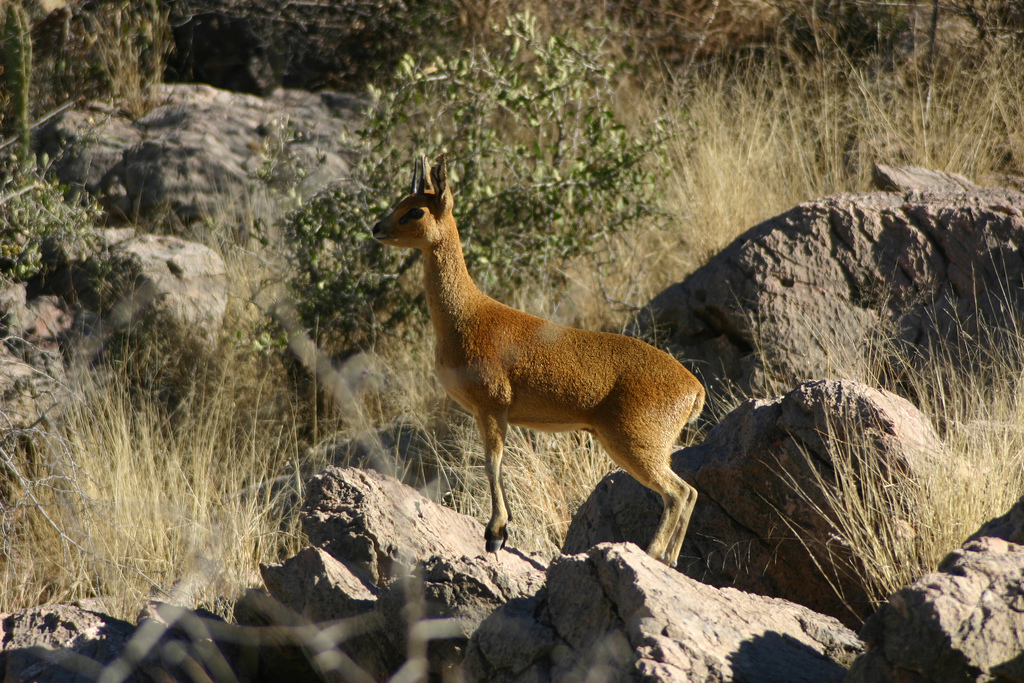
Klipspringers inhabit mountainous regions with sparse vegetation.

The klipspringer inhabits places characterised by rocky terrain and sparse vegetation. It migrates to lowlands at times of food scarcity. The klipspringer occurs at altitudes as high as 4,500 m (15,000 ft) on Mount Kilimanjaro. The klipspringer can occur at high population densities in favourable habitats extending over a large area; 10 to 14 individuals occur per square kilometre in the Simien Mountains National Park, Ethiopia. However, the habitat is typically rocky over long stretches and grassy terrain is discontinuous; consequently the population density is typically between 0.01 and 0.1 individual per square kilometre.

The antelope occurs in significant numbers across eastern and southern Africa; its range extends from northeastern Sudan, Eritrea, northern Somalia and Ethiopia in the east to South Africa in the south, and along coastal Angola and Namibia. Smaller populations occur in the northern and western highlands of Central African Republic, southeastern Democratic Republic of Congo, Jos Plateau and east of Gashaka Gumti National Park in Nigeria. It is feared to be extinct in Burundi.

== Threats and conservation ==
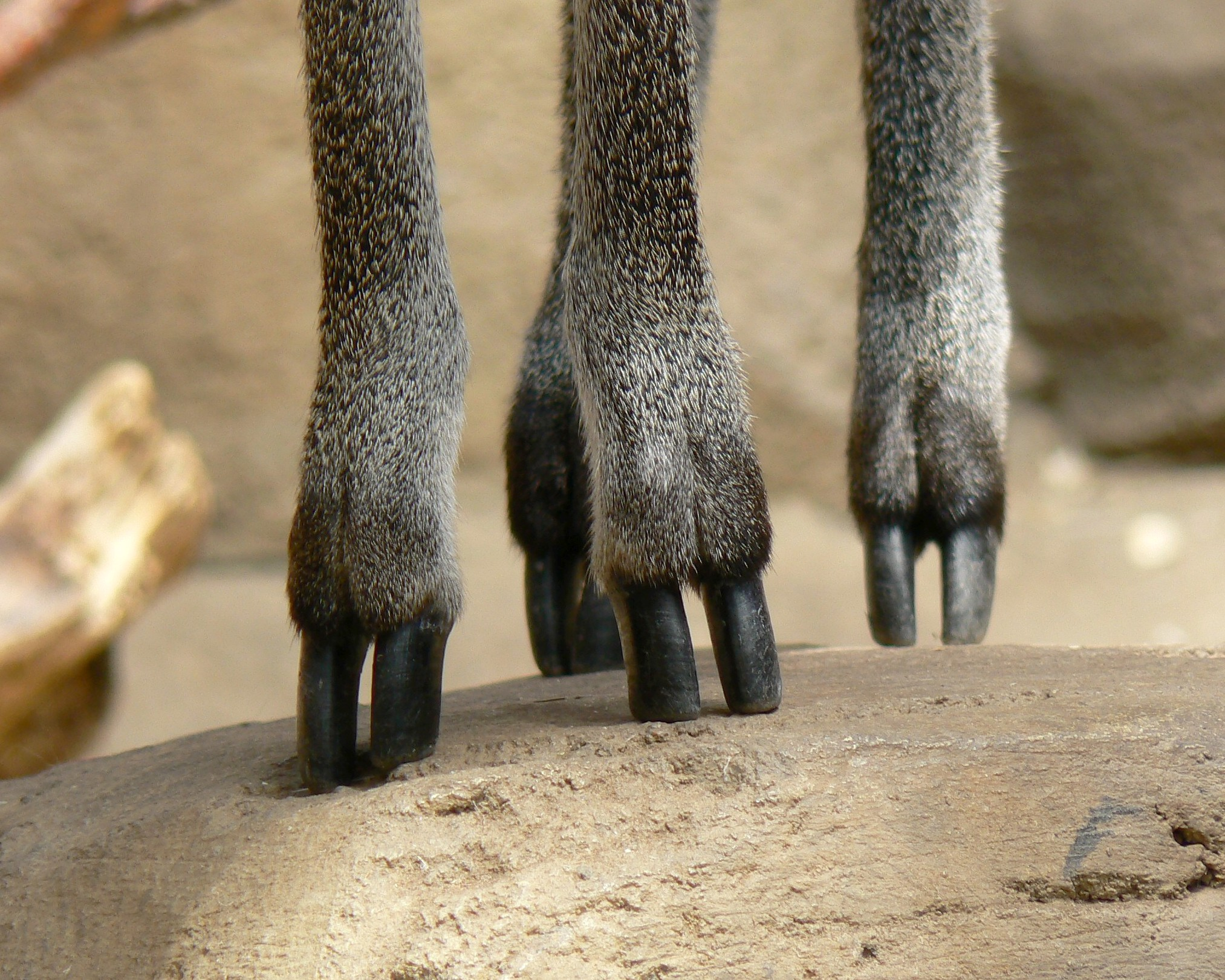
The hooves seen close-up

The International Union for the Conservation of Nature and Natural Resources (IUCN) classifies the klipspringer as Least Concern. The klipspringer is hunted for its meat, leather and hair. However, there are no major threats to the survival of the klipspringer, as its habitat is inaccessible and unfavourable for hunting. Moreover, the antelope does not have to compete with livestock, that do not frequent montane areas. However, populations at lower altitudes are more vulnerable to elimination.

In 1999, Rod East of the IUCN SSC Antelope Specialist Group estimated the total population of klipspringer at 42,000. Significant numbers occur on private farmlands. As of 2008, nearly 25% of the populations occur in protected areas such as the Simien and Bale Mountains National Parks (Ethiopia); Tsavo East and West National Parks (Kenya); North and South Luangwa National Parks (Zambia); Nyika National Park (Malawi); Namib-Naukluft National Park (Namibia); and Matobo National Park (Zimbabwe).
