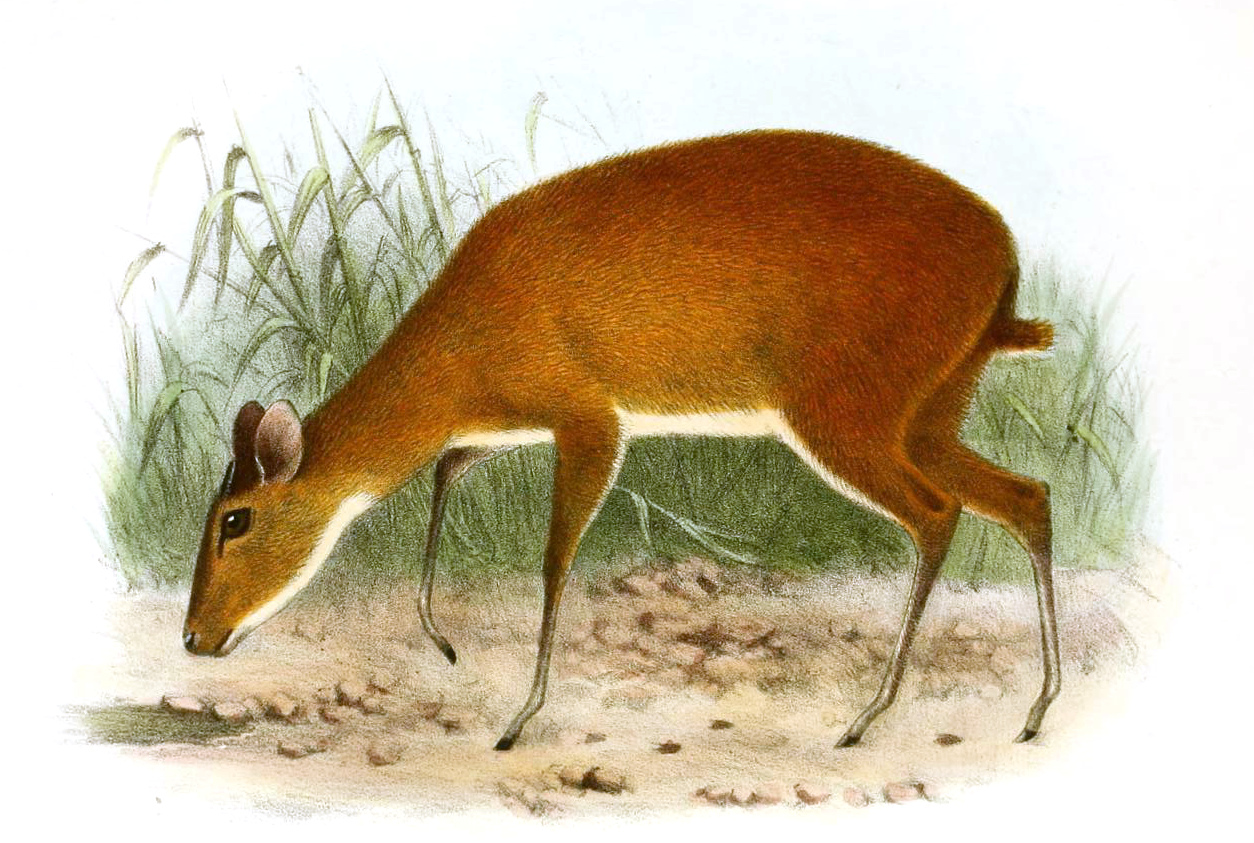

Conservation status
- Least Concern (IUCN 3.1)

Scientific classification
- Kingdom: Animalia
- Phylum: Chordata
- Class: Mammalia
- Order: Artiodactyla
- Family: Bovidae
- Genus: Nesotragus
- Species: N. batesi

Binomial name
- Nesotragus batesi (de Winton, 1903)
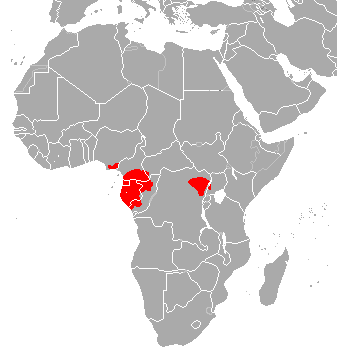
- range

Synonyms
- Neotragus batesi

= Bates's pygmy antelope =

Species of mammal

Bates's pygmy antelope (Nesotragus batesi), also known as the dwarf antelope, pygmy antelope or Bates' dwarf antelope, is a very small antelope living in the moist forest and brush of Central and West Africa. It is in the same genus as the suni.

== Description ==
Adult antelope weigh about 2 to 3 kg (4.4 to 6.6 lb), and are 50 to 57 cm (20 to 22 in) long, with a tail length of 4.5 to 5.0 cm (1.8 to 2.0 in). Only males have horns, about 3.8 to 5.0 cm (1.5 to 2.0 in) long. Their coat is shiny dark chestnut on the back and lighter toward the flanks. Male antelope are generously bigger than females.

== Distribution and habitat ==
Bates pigmy antelope is native to tropical Central Africa. The range is separated into three distinct areas; southeastern Nigeria; the lower part of the Congo Basin; and northeastern Democratic Republic of Congo extending into western Uganda. Its typical habitat is humid lowland forest where it favours dense undergrowth. It also inhabits plantations, secondary forest, cleared areas and areas round human habitations.

== Ecology ==
Bates's pygmy antelope eat leaves, buds, shoots, fungus, grass, and herbs. They also eat crops, which makes them unpopular with farmers. They are often caught in snares near agricultural fields. They have a typical territory of 2 to 4 ha (4.9 to 9.9 acres). Males are territorial, marking their territory with scent produced in the preorbital glands. Females are friendlier with each other and sometimes live in small groups. They bark when fleeing. Most pygmy antelope mate at late dry and early wet seasons. Gestation period is 180 days. One young is born per pregnancy. The fawn weighs between 1.6 and 2.4 kg (3.5 and 5.3 lb).

== Status ==
Bates's pygmy antelope are not endangered although they are facing habitat loss; the expansion of human population has a negative effect on future population. In general, they are able to adapt to secondary forest, plantations, roadside verges and village gardens. Although not hunted commercially, this antelope is hunted for bushmeat in limited numbers.
