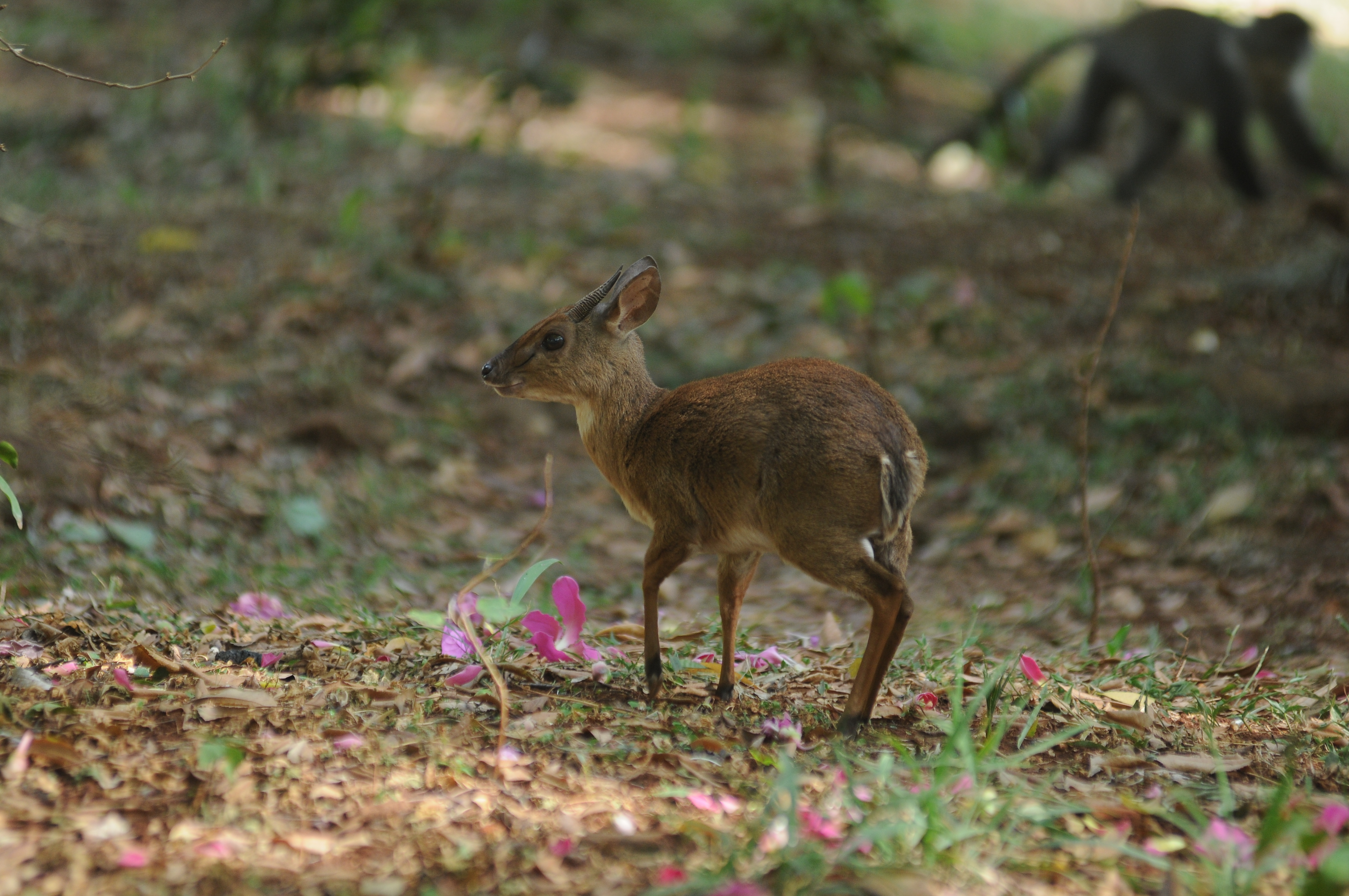
- Male
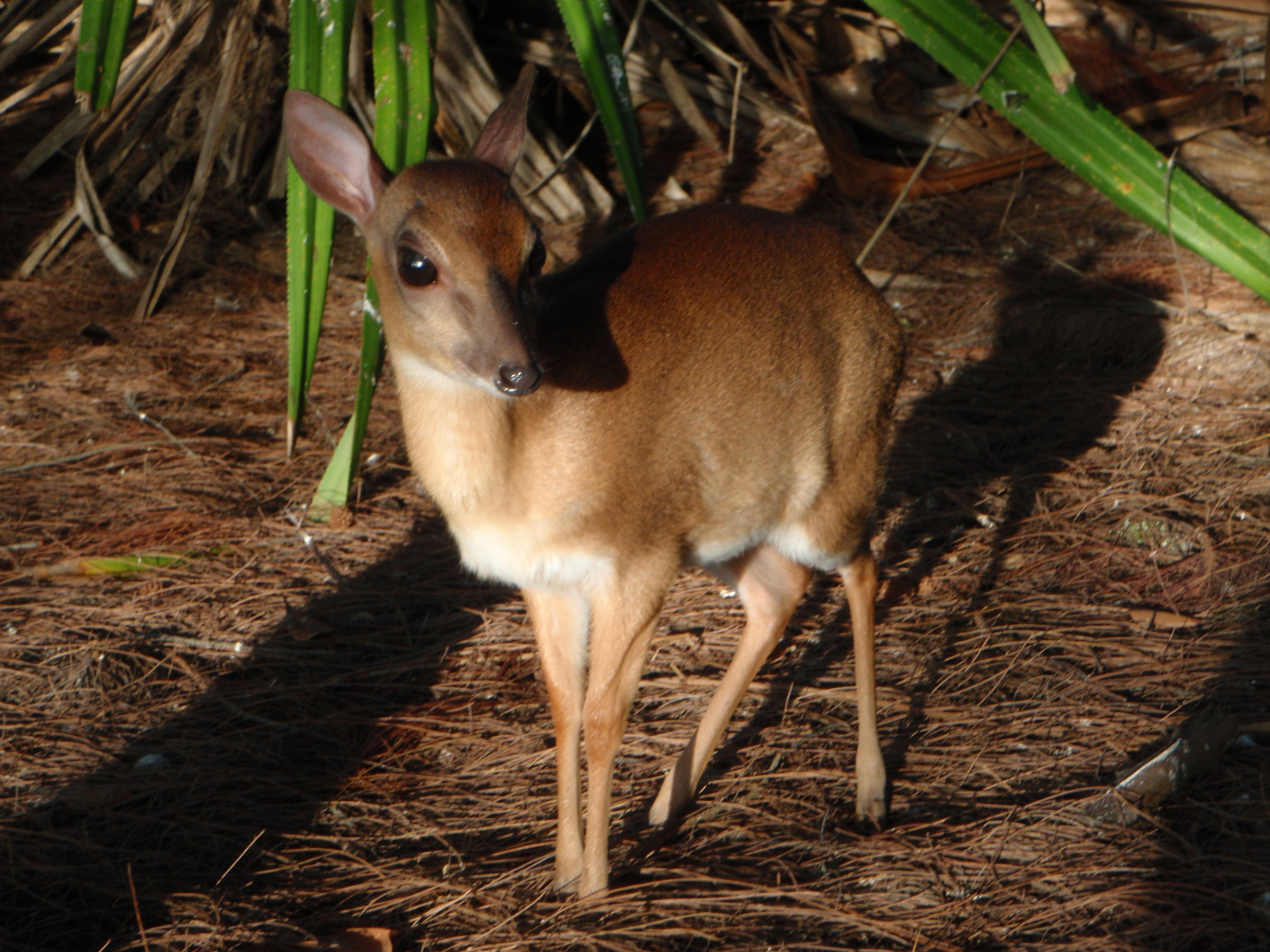
- Female

Conservation status
- Least Concern (IUCN 3.1)

Scientific classification
- Kingdom: Animalia
- Phylum: Chordata
- Class: Mammalia
- Infraclass: Placentalia
- Order: Artiodactyla
- Family: Bovidae
- Genus: Nesotragus
- Species: N. moschatus

Binomial name
- Nesotragus moschatus (Von Dueben, 1846)
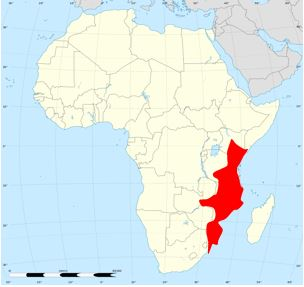

Synonyms
- Neotragus moschatus

= Suni =

Species of antelope

The suni (Nesotragus moschatus) is a small antelope of the family Bovidae, and one of the smallest ungulates on earth. It occurs in dense underbrush from central Kenya to KwaZulu-Natal in South Africa. It is also found on the island of Zanzibar off of Tanzania.

Suni are around 30 to 43 centimetres (12 to 17 inches) high at the shoulder and weigh 4.5 to 5.4 kilograms (9 lb 15 oz to 11 lb 14 oz). They are usually reddish brown, darker on their back than their sides and legs. The belly, chin, throat and insides of legs are white. The nostrils are prominent red, and there are black rings around the eyes and above the hooves. Males have horns 8–13 cm (3–5 in) long, that are ridged most of their length and curve backwards close to their heads. Females do not have horns. Suni can make weak barking and whistling sounds.

Suni feed on leaves, fungi, fruits and flowers, and need almost no free water. They are shy, most active at night, and sleep during the day in a shady, sheltered area. They are social but males defend a territory of about three hectares. They scent-mark the boundaries with secretions from their preorbital glands. There may be an individual or communal dung pile on the periphery of the territory. A male usually takes one mate, but other females may share his territory. A single calf is born weighing about two pounds, after a gestation of 183 days.

Felids, raptors, snakes, and other meat-eaters prey on suni. For protection, they are well camouflaged in dry grass and keep very still. When a predator is almost on top of them, they spring out and bound away into the underbrush.

== Taxonomy and etymology ==
The scientific name of the suni is Nesotragus moschatus; the species is in the genus Nesotragus, formerly with the Bates' pygmy antelope (Nesotragus batesi). The common name suni (/ˈsünē/) is the Swahili name for this antelope in southeastern Africa. Four subspecies are identified, though these are sometimes considered to be independent species:

- Coastal suni — N. m. moschatus (Von Dueben, 1846) — found on the Zanzibar Archipelago (Changuu and Chapwani islands; Jozani, Kendwa, Kizimkazi and Nungwi, Unguja) and coastal Kenya (Arabuko Sokoke Park, Mombasa, Watamu).
- Livingstone's suni — N. m. livingstonianus (Kirk, 1865) — South Africa (KwaZulu-Natal), Malawi, inland Mozambique, Zambia and Zimbabwe.
- Mountain suni — N. m. kirchenpaueri (Pagenstecher, 1885) — Kenya (Aberdare Range, Karura Forest, Mount Kenya, Nairobi National Park) and Tanzania (Arusha National Park).
- Southern suni — N. m. zuluensis (Thomas, 1898) — South Africa (KwaZulu-Natal, Hluhluwe-Imfozoli, iSimangaliso Wetland Park), Eswatini (Mkhaya Game Reserve), and coastal southern Mozambique (Ponta do Ouro and surrounding areas).

== Description ==
The suni is a small antelope, but larger than the other two species of its genus. This antelope resembles Bates's pygmy antelope in terms of cranial measurements. The suni stands 33–38 centimetres (13–15 in) at the shoulder; the head-and-body length is typically between 57 and 62 cm (22 and 24 in). Both sexes weigh between 4.5 and 7 kg (9.9 and 15.4 lb).

Horns are present only on males; sexual dimorphism in the suni is less marked than in Bates's pygmy antelope.

== Threats and conservation ==
Populations of the suni have been notably reduced due to poaching, habitat loss and predation by dogs - especially in South Africa, where it is confined mainly to the northeastern KwaZulu-Natal. Nevertheless, the antelope is known for its tolerance to heavy hunting pressure, and is listed as a species of Least Concern.
