= List of artiodactyls =

Animals in mammal order Artiodactyla

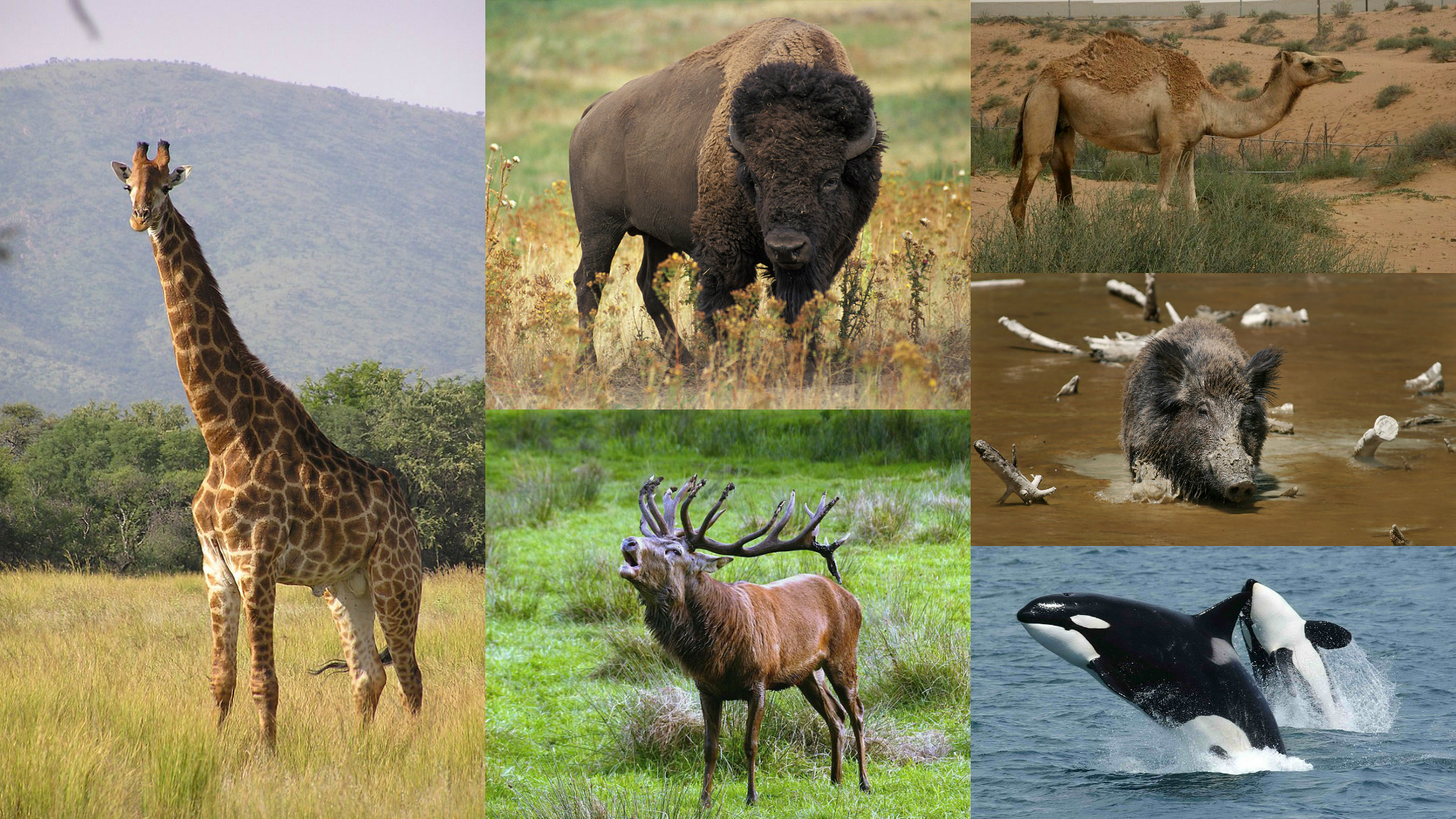
Various artiodactyls, representing all four suborders.

Artiodactyla is an order of placental mammals composed of even-toed ungulates – hooved animals which bear weight equally on two of their five toes with the other toes either present, absent, vestigial, or pointing posteriorly – as well as their descendants, the aquatic cetaceans. Members of this order are called artiodactyls. The order is sometimes named Cetartiodactyla, in reference to the inclusion of cetaceans in the order beginning in the 1990s. Artiodactyla currently comprises 349 extant species, which are grouped into 132 genera. Artiodactyls live on every major landmass and throughout the oceans and in a variety of habitats, including forests, grasslands, and deserts. They come in a wide array of body plans in contrasting shapes and sizes, ranging from the 38 cm (15 in) long and 2.5 kg (5.5 lb) royal antelope to the 27 m (89 ft) long and 120 ton blue whale. Some artiodactyls, such as cattle, goats, sheep, pigs, water buffalo, camels, and llamas, have been domesticated, resulting in a worldwide distribution and population sizes for some animals of over one billion.

Artiodactyla is divided into four suborders: Ruminantia, Suina, Tylopoda, and Whippomorpha. The suborders are further subdivided into clades and families. Ruminantia contains six families, Antilocapridae, Bovidae, Cervidae, Giraffidae, Moschidae, and Tragulidae, and includes ruminant animals such as cattle, antelope, deer, and sheep. Suina contains two, Suidae and Tayassuidae, and includes pigs and peccaries; Tylopoda comprises only Camelidae, the camels and llamas; and Whippomorpha contains fifteen, Balaenidae, Balaenopteridae, Cetotheriidae, Delphinidae, Eschrichtiidae, Iniidae, Kogiidae, Lipotidae, Monodontidae, Phocoenidae, Physeteridae, Platanistidae, Pontoporiidae, Ziphiidae, and Hippopotamidae, and includes the aquatic whales and dolphins as well as hippopotamuses. The exact organization of the species is not fixed, with many recent proposals made based on molecular phylogenetic analysis. Three species have gone extinct since 1500 CE: the aurochs and the bluebuck in Bovidae and Schomburgk's deer in Cervidae. Additionally, the red gazelle in Bovidae is considered either extinct or to have never existed; the kouprey in Bovidae is potentially extinct, with no sightings since 1969; and so is the baiji in Lipotidae, last seen in 2002. Several other species are extinct in the wild or critically endangered.

== Conventions ==
The author citation for the species or genus is given after the scientific name; parentheses around the author citation indicate that this was not the original taxonomic placement. Range maps are provided wherever possible; if a range map is not available, a description of the collective range of species in that genera is provided. Ranges are based on the International Union for Conservation of Nature (IUCN) Red List of Threatened Species unless otherwise noted. All extinct genera or species listed alongside extant species went extinct after 1500 CE, and are indicated by a dagger symbol "†".

== Classification ==
The order Artiodactyla consists of 349 extant species belonging to 133 genera. This does not include hybrid species or extinct prehistoric species. Modern molecular studies indicate that the 133 genera can be grouped into 24 families; these families are grouped into named suborders and many are further grouped into named clades, and some of these families are subdivided into named subfamilies.

Suborder Ruminantia

- Infraorder Pecora
  - Family Antilocapridae (pronghorn): 1 genus, 1 species
  - Family Bovidae
    - Subfamily Aepycerotinae (impala): 1 genus, 1 species
    - Subfamily Alcelaphinae (wildebeest, hartebeest, bonteboks): 4 genera, 6 species
    - Subfamily Antilopinae (antelope, gazelles): 14 genera, 36 species
    - Subfamily Bovinae (cattle, buffalos, bison): 9 genera, 30 species (1 extinct)
    - Subfamily Caprinae (goats, sheep, ibex, serows): 14 genera, 35 species
    - Subfamily Cephalophinae (duikers): 3 genera, 20 species
    - Subfamily Hippotraginae (addax, oryx): 3 genera, 8 species (1 extinct)
    - Subfamily Nesotraginae (dwarf antelope): 1 genus, 2 species
    - Subfamily Oreotraginae (klipspringer): 1 genus, 1 species
    - Subfamily Reduncinae (reedbuck and kob antelope): 3 genera, 9 species
  - Family Cervidae (deer)
    - Subfamily Capreolinae (New World deer): 10 genera, 23 species
    - Subfamily Cervinae (Old World deer): 9 genera, 32 species (1 extinct)
  - Family Giraffidae (okapi and giraffes): 2 genera, 5 species
  - Family Moschidae (musk deer): 1 genus, 7 species
- Infraorder Tragulina
  - Family Tragulidae (chevrotains): 3 genera, 10 species

Suborder Suina

- Family Suidae (pigs): 6 genera, 17 species
- Family Tayassuidae (peccaries): 3 genera, 3 species

Suborder Tylopoda

- Family Camelidae (camels and llamas): 2 genera, 7 species

Suborder Whippomorpha

- Infraorder Cetacea
  - Parvorder Mysticeti (baleen whales)
    - Family Balaenidae (right whales): 2 genera, 4 species
    - Family Balaenopteridae (rorquals): 3 genera, 10 species
    - Family Cetotheriidae (pygmy right whale): 1 genus, 1 species
    - Family Eschrichtiidae (gray whale): 1 genera, 1 species
  - Parvorder Odontoceti (toothed whales)
    - Family Delphinidae (oceanic dolphins)
      - Subfamily Delphininae (dolphins): 6 genera, 15 species
      - Subfamily Lissodelphininae (smooth dolphins): 2 genera, 6 species
      - Subfamily Globicephalinae (round-headed whales)
      - Subfamily Orcininae (killer whale): 7 genera, 9 species
      - Subfamily incertae sedis (white-beaked dolphin and Atlantic white-sided dolphin): 1 genera, 6 species
    - Family Iniidae (Amazonian river dolphins): 1 genus, 4 species
    - Family Kogiidae (dwarf and pygmy sperm whales): 1 genus, 2 species
    - Family Lipotidae (Chinese river dolphins): 1 genus, 1 species
    - Family Monodontidae (narwhal and beluga): 2 genera, 2 species
    - Family Phocoenidae (porpoises): 3 genera, 8 species
    - Family Physeteridae (sperm whale): 1 genus, 1 species
    - Family Platanistidae (South Asian river dolphins): 1 genus, 2 species
    - Family Pontoporiidae (brackish river dolphins): 1 genus, 1 species
    - Family Ziphiidae (beaked whales)
      - Subfamily Berardiinae (four-toothed whales): 1 genus, 3 species
      - Subfamily Hyperoodontinae (bottlenose whales and mesoplodont whales): 3 genera, 18 species
      - Subfamily Ziphiinae (Cuvier's beaked whale and Shepherd's beaked whale): 2 genera, 2 species
- Family Hippopotamidae (hippopotamuses): 2 genera, 2 species

- Artiodactyla
  - Ruminantia
    - Tragulina
      - Tragulidae
    - Pecora
      - Antilocapridae
      - Giraffidae
      - - Cervidae
        - - Bovidae
          - Moschidae
  - Suina
    - Suidae
    - Tayassuidae
  - Tylopoda
    - Camelidae
  - Whippomorpha
    - Hippopotamidae
    - Cetacea
      - Mysticeti
        - Balaenidae
        - - Balaenopteridae
          - Cetotheriidae
      - Odontoceti
        - - Kogiidae
          - Physeteridae
        - - Platanistidae
          - - Ziphiidae
            - - - Iniidae
                - Pontoporiidae
              - - Delphinidae
                - - Monodontidae
                  - Phocoenidae

== Artiodactyls ==
The following classification is based on the taxonomy described by Mammal Species of the World (2005), with augmentation by generally accepted proposals made since using molecular phylogenetic analysis.

=== Suborder Ruminantia ===
==== Infraorder Pecora ====
===== Family Antilocapridae =====
Members of the Antilocapridae family are called antilocaprids; the family is composed of a single extant species, the pronghorn.

Not assigned to a named subfamily – one genus
Name	Authority and species	Range	Size and ecology
Antilocapra	Ord, 1818 One species: A. americana (pronghorn)	Western North America (former range in yellow)	Size: 130–140 cm (51–55 in) long, plus 9–11 cm (4–4 in) tail Habitats: Shrubland, grassland, and desert Diet: Shrubs and forbs, as well as grass

===== Family Bovidae =====
Members of the Bovidae family are bovids and include sheep, cattle, goats, antelope, and others. Bovidae comprises 144 extant species, divided into 52 genera. These genera are grouped into eight subfamilies: Aepycerotinae, or the impala; Alcelaphinae, containing the bontebok, hartebeest, wildebeest, and relatives; Antilopinae, containing several antelope, gazelles, and relatives; Bovinae, containing cattle, buffalos, bison, and other antelopes; Caprinae, containing goats, sheep, ibex, serows and relatives; Cephalophinae, or duikers; Hippotraginae, containing the addax, oryx, and relatives; and Reduncinae, or reedbuck and kob antelopes.

Subfamily Aepycerotinae – J. E. Gray, 1872 – one genus
Name	Authority and species	Range	Size and ecology
Aepyceros	Sundevall, 1847 One species: A. melampus (impala)	Southern Africa (Common impala in green)	Size: 120–160 cm (47–63 in) long, plus 30–45 cm (12–18 in) tail Habitats: Savanna, shrubland, and grassland Diet: Grass and shrubs

Subfamily Alcelaphinae – Brooke, 1876 – four genera
Name	Authority and species	Range	Size and ecology
Alcelaphus	Blainville, 1816 One species: A. buselaphus (hartebeest)	Scattered sub-Saharan Africa	Size: 150–245 cm (59–96 in) long, plus 30–70 cm (12–28 in) tail Habitats: Forest, savanna, shrubland, and grassland Diet: Grass
Beatragus	Heller, 1912 One species: B. hunteri (hirola)	Border between Kenya and Somalia	Size: 120–205 cm (47–81 in) long, plus 30–45 cm (12–18 in) tail Habitats: Savanna, shrubland, and grassland Diet: Grass, as well as forbs
Connochaetes (wildebeest)	Lichtenstein, 1812 Two species: C. gnou (black wildebeest); C. taurinus (blue wildebeest, pictured)	Southern Africa	Size range: 170 cm (67 in) long, plus 60 cm (24 in) tail (blue wildebeast) to 242 cm (95 in) long, plus 45 cm (18 in) tail (black wildebeast) Habitats: Savanna, shrubland, and grassland Diets: Grass
Damaliscus (tsessebe)	P. L. Sclater, Thomas, 1894 Two species: D. lunatus (topi); D. pygargus (bontebok, pictured)	Southern Africa	Size range: 140 cm (55 in) long, plus 30 cm (12 in) tail (bontebok) to 230 cm (91 in) long, plus 42 cm (17 in) tail (common tsessebe) Habitats: Savanna, shrubland, and grassland Diets: Grass and burnt veldt shrubs

Subfamily Antilopinae – J. E. Gray, 1821 – fourteen genera
Name	Authority and species	Range	Size and ecology
Ammodorcas	Thomas, 1891 One species: A. clarkei (dibatag)	Horn of Africa	Size: 152–168 cm (60–66 in) long, plus 25–35 cm (10–14 in) tail Habitats: Shrubland and grassland Diet: Leaves and shoots
Antidorcas	Sundevall, 1847 One species: A. marsupialis (springbok)	Southern Africa	Size: 120–150 cm (47–59 in) long, plus 14–28 cm (6–11 in) tail Habitats: Savanna, shrubland, grassland, and desert Diet: Shrubs and grass
Antilope	Pallas, 1766 One species: A. cervicapra (blackbuck)	India (former range in light green)	Size: Up to 120 cm (47 in) long Habitats: Forest, grassland, and desert Diet: Grass, as well as leaf litter, flowers, and fruit
Dorcatragus	Noack, 1894 One species: D. megalotis (beira)	Horn of Africa	Size: 76–87 cm (30–34 in) long, plus 5–8 cm (2–3 in) tail Habitats: Shrubland, and rocky areas Diet: Shrubs
Eudorcas	Fitzinger, 1869 Five species: E. albonotata (Mongalla gazelle); E. rufifrons (red-fronted gazelle); E. rufina (red gazelle†); E. thomsonii (Thomson's gazelle, pictured); E. tilonura (Heuglin's gazelle)	Sub-Saharan Africa	Size range: 55 cm (22 in) long, plus 15 cm (6 in) tail (Heuglin's gazelle) to 120 cm (47 in) long, plus 27 cm (11 in) tail (Mongalla gazelle, Red-fronted gazelle, Thomson's gazelle) Habitats: Forest, savanna, shrubland, and grassland Diets: Grass and shrubs, as well as forbs and fruit
Gazella (gazelle)	Blainville, 1816 Ten species: G. arabica (Arabian gazelle); G. bennettii (chinkara); G. cuvieri (Cuvier's gazelle); G. dorcas (dorcas gazelle); G. erlangeri (Erlanger's gazelle); G. gazella (mountain gazelle); G. leptoceros (rhim gazelle); G. marica (Arabian sand gazelle); G. spekei (Speke's gazelle); G. subgutturosa (goitered gazelle)	North Africa, Arabian Peninsula, Asia	Size range: 90 cm (35 in) long, plus 15 cm (6 in) tail (Dorcas gazelle) to 125 cm (49 in) long, plus 20 cm (8 in) tail (Erlanger's gazelle) Habitats: Forest, shrubland, grassland, rocky areas, desert, and coastal marine Diets: Grass, forbs, leaves, crops, fruit, and low plants
Litocranius	Kohl, 1886 One species: L. walleri (gerenuk)	Horn of Africa	Size: 140–160 cm (55–63 in) long, plus 2–4 cm (1–2 in) tail Habitats: Savanna and shrubland Diet: Shrubs
Madoqua (dik-dik)	(Ogilby, 1837) Four species: M. guentheri (Günther's dik-dik); M. kirkii (Kirk's dik-dik, pictured); M. piacentinii (silver dik-dik); M. saltiana (Salt's dik-dik)	Eastern and southwestern Africa	Size range: 45 cm (18 in) long, plus 3 cm (1 in) tail (silver dik-dik) to 67 cm (26 in) long, plus 6 cm (2 in) tail (Kirk's dik-dik, Salt's dik-dik) Habitats: Forest and shrubland Diets: Shrubs, leaves, and grass, as well as flowers, herbs, and sedges
Nanger	Lataste, 1885 Three species: N. dama (dama gazelle); N. granti (Grant's gazelle, pictured); N. soemmerringii (Soemmerring's gazelle)	Eastern Africa and scattered Saharan Desert	Size range: 125 cm (49 in) long, plus 18 cm (7 in) tail (Soemmerring's gazelle) to 168 cm (66 in) long (Dama gazelle) Habitats: Savanna, shrubland, grassland, and desert Diets: Leaves, grass, stems, shrubs, and herbs
Neotragus	H. Smith, 1827 One species: N. pygmaeus (royal antelope)	Sub-Saharan Africa	Size: 38 cm (15 in) long, plus 5 cm (2 in) tail Habitats: Forest and shrubland Diet: Leaves and shoots, as well as fruit and fungi
Ourebia	Laurillard, 1842 One species: O. ourebia (oribi)	Sub-Saharan Africa	Size: 92–110 cm (36–43 in) long Habitats: Savanna and grassland Diet: Grass and shrubs
Procapra	Hodgson, 1846 Three species: P. gutturosa (Mongolian gazelle); P. picticaudata (goa, pictured); P. przewalskii (Przewalski's gazelle)	Central Asia	Size range: 91 cm (36 in) long, plus 8 cm (3 in) tail (goa) to 130 cm (51 in) long (Mongolian gazelle) Habitats: Grassland, inland wetlands, and desert Diets: Grass, onions, forbs, legumes, sedges, and shrubs
Raphicerus	H. Smith, 1827 Three species: R. campestris (steenbok, pictured); R. melanotis (Cape grysbok); R. sharpei (Sharpe's grysbok)	Southern Africa	Size range: 65 cm (26 in) long, plus 4 cm (2 in) tail (Sharpe's grysbok) to 95 cm (37 in) long, plus 6 cm (2 in) tail (steenbok) Habitats: Savanna, shrubland, and grassland Diets: Shrubs, grass, geophytes, berries, flowers, and fruit
Saiga	J. E. Gray, 1843 One species: S. tatarica (saiga antelope)	Central Asia (historical range in white)	Size: 108–146 cm (43–57 in) long, plus 6–13 cm (2–5 in) tail Habitats: Grassland and desert Diet: Grass

Subfamily Bovinae – J. E. Gray, 1821 – nine genera
Name	Authority and species	Range	Size and ecology
Bison (bison)	H. Smith, 1827 Two species: B. bison (American bison, pictured); B. bonasus (European bison)	Scattered North America and Europe	Size range: 210–380 cm (83–150 in) long, plus 43–90 cm (17–35 in) tail (American bison) Habitats: Forest, savanna, shrubland, grassland, inland wetlands, and desert Diets: Grass, leaves, sedges, herbs, and roots, as well as trees, shrubs, and sagebrush
Bos	Linnaeus, 1758 Ten species: B. domesticus (Bali cattle); B. frontalis (gayal); B. gaurus (gaur); B. grunniens (domestic yak); B. indicus (zebu); B. javanicus (banteng); B. mutus (wild yak); B. primigenius (aurochs)†; B. sauveli (kouprey); B. taurus (cattle, pictured)	Central, southern, and southeastern Asia, plus worldwide distribution of cattle	Size range: 145 cm (57 in) long, plus 60 cm (24 in) tail (yak), to 385 cm (152 in) long, plus 60 cm (24 in) tail (wild yak) Habitats: Forest, savanna, grassland, shrubland, rocky areas, and desert Diets: Grass, sedges, shrubs, forbs, herbs, and bamboo, as well as leaves, fruit, flowers, lichen, moss, bark, and young branches of shrubs and trees
Boselaphus	Blainville, 1816 One species: B. tragocamelus (nilgai)	Indian subcontinent	Size: 180–200 cm (71–79 in) long Habitats: Forest, shrubland, and grassland Diet: Grass and shrubs
Bubalus	H. Smith, 1827 Five species: B. arnee (wild water buffalo); B. bubalis (water buffalo pictured); B. depressicornis (lowland anoa); B. mindorensis (tamaraw); B. quarlesi (mountain anoa)	Scattered southeast Asia, as well as scattered Asia, Egypt, and South America	Size range: 122 cm (48 in) long (mountain anoa) to 300 cm (118 in) long, plus 100 cm (39 in) tail (water buffalo, wild water buffalo) Habitats: Forest, shrubland, savanna, grassland, and inland wetlands Diets: Grass, shrubs, sedges, and young bamboo shoots, as well as herbs, fruit, and leaves
Pseudoryx	Dung, Giao, Chinh, Tuoc, Arctander, MacKinnon, 1993 One species: P. nghetinhensis (saola)	Annamite Range of Vietnam and Laos	Size: 143–150 cm (56–59 in) long, plus up to 25 cm (10 in) tail Habitats: Forest Diet: Leaves as well as shrubs
Syncerus	Hodgson, 1847 One species: S. caffer (African buffalo)	Sub-Saharan Africa	Size: 240–340 cm (94–134 in) long, plus 75–110 cm (30–43 in) tail Habitats: Forest, savanna, shrubland, grassland, and inland wetlands Diet: Grass
Taurotragus (eland)	Wagner, 1855 Two species: T. derbianus (giant eland); T. oryx (common eland, pictured)	Sub-Saharan Africa	Size range: 200 cm (79 in) long, plus 50 cm (20 in) tail (common eland), to 345 cm (136 in) long, plus 70 cm (28 in) tail (giant eland) Habitats: Forest, savanna, shrubland, and grassland Diets: Leaves, shrubs, shoots, herbs, and fruit, as well as grass
Tetracerus	Leach, 1825 One species: T. quadricornis (four-horned antelope)	Indian subcontinent	Size: 80–110 cm (31–43 in) long, plus 10–15 cm (4–6 in) tail Habitats: Forest and shrubland Diet: Grass and shrubs
Tragelaphus	(Blainville, 1816) Seven species: T. angasii (nyala); T. buxtoni (mountain nyala); T. eurycerus (bongo, pictured); T. imberbis (lesser kudu); T. scriptus (harnessed bushbuck); T. spekii (sitatunga); T. strepsiceros (greater kudu)	Sub-Saharan Africa	Size range: 105 cm (41 in) long, plus 19 cm (7 in) tail (harnessed bushbuck) to 260 cm (102 in) long (mountain nyala) Habitats: Forest, savanna, shrubland, grassland, desert, and inland wetlands Diets: Grass, sedges, herbs, leaves, fruit, and shrubs

Subfamily Caprinae – J. E. Gray, 1821 – fourteen genera
Name	Authority and species	Range	Size and ecology
Ammotragus	(Blyth, 1840) One species: A. lervia (Barbary sheep)	Northern Africa	Size: 130–165 cm (51–65 in) long, plus 12–25 cm (5–10 in) tail Habitats: Savanna, shrubland, grassland, rocky areas, and desert Diet: Grass, shrubs, and forbs
Arabitragus	Ropiquet, Hassanin, 2005 One species: A. jayakari (Arabian tahr)	Eastern Arabia	Size: 93–95 cm (37–37 in) long, plus up to 8–10 cm (3–4 in) tail Habitats: Shrubland, rocky areas, and desert Diet: Grass, forbs, shrubs, and trees
Budorcas	Hodgson, 1850 One species: B. taxicolor (takin)	Eastern Himalayas	Size: 170–220 cm (67–87 in) long, plus 15 cm (6 in) tail Habitats: Forest, shrubland, and grassland Diet: Grass, bamboo shoots, forbs, and leaves
Capra (goat)	Linnaeus, 1758 Nine species: C. aegagrus (wild goat, pictured); C. caucasica (West Caucasian tur); C. cylindricornis (East Caucasian tur); C. ibex (Alpine ibex); C. falconeri (markhor); C. nubiana (Nubian ibex); C. pyrenaica (Iberian ibex); C. sibirica (Siberian ibex); C. walie (Walia ibex)	Scattered Europe, Northeast Africa, and western and central Asia	Size range: 100 cm (39 in) long, plus 10 cm (4 in) tail (Iberian ibex) to 185 cm (73 in) long, plus 14 cm (6 in) tail (markhor) Habitats: Forest, shrubland, grassland, desert, and rocky areas Diets: Grass, shrubs, trees, herbs, lichens, and a variety of other plants
Capricornis (serow)	Ogilby, 1836 Four species: C. crispus (Japanese serow, pictured); C. rubidus (red serow); C. sumatraensis (mainland serow); C. swinhoei (Taiwan serow)	Eastern Asia	Size range: 80 cm (31 in) long, plus 7 cm (3 in) tail (Taiwan serow) to 155 cm (61 in) long, plus 16 cm (6 in) tail (mainland serow) Habitats: Forest, shrubland, grassland, and rocky areas Diets: Grass, shoots, leaves, shrubs, acorns, and twigs
Hemitragus	(Hodgson, 1841) One species: H. jemlahicus (Himalayan tahr)	Himalayas	Size: 90–140 cm (35–55 in) long Habitats: Forest, shrubland, grassland, and rocky areas Diet: Herbaceous plants and shrubs, grass, and sedges
Naemorhedus (goral)	H. Smith, 1827 Four species: N. baileyi (red goral); N. caudatus (long-tailed goral); N. goral (Himalayan goral); N. griseus (Chinese goral, pictured)	Himalayas and Eastern Asia	Size range: 81 cm (32 in) long (long-tailed goral) to 130 cm (51 in) long (Himalayan goral) Habitats: Forest, shrubland, grassland, and rocky areas Diets: Grass, herbs, shoots, leaves, nuts, fruit, and lichen
Nilgiritragus	Ropiquet, Hassanin, 2005 One species: N. hylocrius (Nilgiri tahr)	Southern India	Size: 90–140 cm (35–55 in) long, plus 9–12 cm (4–5 in) tail Habitats: Shrubland, grassland, and rocky areas Diet: Grass and forbs
Oreamnos	Rafinesque, 1817 One species: O. americanus (mountain goat)	Western North America	Size: 120–160 cm (47–63 in) long, plus 8–20 cm (3–8 in) tail Habitats: Forest, shrubland, grassland, and rocky areas Diet: Grass, forbs, sedges, ferns, moss, lichen, twigs, and leaves
Ovibos	Blainville, 1816 One species: O. moschatus (muskox)	The Arctic (reintroduced in blue)	Size: 190–270 cm (75–106 in) long, plus 7–12 cm (3–5 in) tail Habitat: Grassland Diet: Sedges and grass, as well as shrubs and some forbs
Ovis (sheep)	Linnaeus, 1758 Seven species: O. ammon (argali); O. aries (sheep, pictured); O. canadensis (bighorn sheep); O. dalli (Dall sheep); O. gmelini (mouflon); O. nivicola (snow sheep); O. vignei (urial)	Asia and western North America, plus worldwide domesticated sheep	Size range: 105 cm (41 in) long, plus 12 cm (5 in) tail (mouflon) to 190 cm (75 in) long (argali) Habitats: Forest, shrubland, grassland, rocky areas, savanna, and desert Diets: Grass and shrubs, as well as a wide variety of vegetation
Pantholops	Hodgson, 1834 One species: P. hodgsonii (Tibetan antelope)	Tibetan Plateau	Size: 120–130 cm (47–51 in) long Habitat: Grassland Diet: Grass and herbs
Pseudois	Hodgson, 1846 One species: P. nayaur (bharal)	Himalayas	Size: 120–140 cm (47–55 in) long Habitats: Forest, shrubland, grassland, rocky areas, and desert Diet: Grass, alpine herbs, and lichens
Rupicapra	Blainville, 1816 Two species: R. pyrenaica (Pyrenean chamois); R. rupicapra (chamois)	Europe and western Asia	Size range: 90 cm (35 in) long, plus 3 cm (1 in) tail (Pyrenean chamois) to 135 cm (53 in) long (chamois) Habitats: Forest, shrubland, grassland, and rocky areas Diets: Grass, herbs, tree leaves, flowers, buds, shoots, and fungi, as well as lichen, moss, and young pine shoots

Subfamily Cephalophinae – Gray, 1871 – three genera
Name	Authority and species	Range	Size and ecology
Cephalophus	H. Smith, 1827 Sixteen species: C. adersi (Aders's duiker); C. brookei (Brooke's duiker); C. callipygus (Peters's duiker); C. crusalbum (white-legged duiker); C. dorsalis (bay duiker); C. jentinki (Jentink's duiker); C. leucogaster (white-bellied duiker); C. natalensis (red forest duiker); C. niger (black duiker); C. nigrifrons (black-fronted duiker); C. ogilbyi (Ogilby's duiker); C. rufilatus (red-flanked duiker); C. silvicultor (yellow-backed duiker, pictured); C. spadix (Abbott's duiker); C. weynsi (Weyns's duiker); C. zebra (zebra duiker)	Sub-Saharan Africa	Size range: 60 cm (24 in) long (red-flanked duiker) to 150 cm (59 in) long, plus 16 cm (6 in) tail (Jentink's duiker) Habitats: Forest, savanna, and shrubland Diets: Leaves, fruit, flowers, twigs, nuts, and tree stems, as well as shrubs, grass, insects, and eggs
Philantomba	Blyth, 1840 Three species: P. maxwellii (Maxwell's duiker); P. monticola (blue duiker, pictured); P. walteri (Walter's duiker)	Sub-Saharan Africa	Size range: 36 cm (14 in) long, plus 14 cm (6 in) tail (Maxwell's duiker) to 72 cm (28 in) long, plus 13 cm (5 in) tail (blue duiker) Habitats: Forest and shrubland Diets: Leaves, fruit, seeds, flowers, and fungi
Sylvicapra	Ogilby, 1837 One species: S. grimmia (common duiker)	Sub-Saharan Africa	Size: 70–105 cm (28–41 in) long, plus 10–20 cm (4–8 in) tail Habitats: Forest, savanna, shrubland, grassland, and desert Diet: Variety of foliage, herbs, fruit, seeds, and cultivated crops

Subfamily Hippotraginae – Sundevall, 1845 – three genera
Name	Authority and species	Range	Size and ecology
Addax	Laurillard, 1841 One species: A. nasomaculatus (addax)	Scattered western Africa	Size: 150–170 cm (59–67 in) long, plus 25–35 cm (10–14 in) tail Habitats: Savanna, grassland, and desert Diet: Grass and shrubs
Hippotragus	Sundevall, 1846 Three species: H. equinus (roan antelope, pictured); H. leucophaeus (bluebuck)†; H. niger (sable antelope)	Sub-Saharan Africa	Size range: 190 cm (75 in) long, plus 37 cm (15 in) tail (roan antelope) to 300 cm (118 in) long (bluebuck) Habitats: Forest, savanna, shrubland, and grassland Diets: Grass, as well as forbs and leaves
Oryx (oryx)	Blainville, 1816 Four species: O. beisa (East African oryx); O. dammah (scimitar oryx); O. gazella (gemsbok); O. leucoryx (Arabian oryx, pictured)	Eastern and southern Africa and Arabian Peninsula	Size range: 153 cm (60 in) long, plus 45 cm (18 in) tail (East African oryx) to 235 cm (93 in) long, plus 90 cm (35 in) tail (Arabian oryx) Habitats: Savanna, shrubland, grassland, and desert Diets: Grass, shrubs, herbs, roots, and buds, as well as fruit and vegetables

Subfamily Nesotraginae – von Düben (de), 1846 – one genus
Name	Authority and species	Range	Size and ecology
Nesotragus	von Düben (de), 1846 Two species: N. batesi (Bates's pygmy antelope); N. moschatus (suni, pictured)	Sub-Saharan Africa	Size range: 50 cm (20 in) long, plus 5 cm (2 in) tail (Bates's pygmy antelope) to 62 cm (24 in) long (suni) Habitats: Forest and shrubland Diets: Leaves and shoots, as well as fruit and fungi

Subfamily Oreotraginae – Pocock, 1910 – one genus
Name	Authority and species	Range	Size and ecology
Oreotragus	A. Smith, 1834 One species: O. oreotragus (klipspringer)	Southern and Eastern Africa	Size: 75–115 cm (30–45 in) long Habitats: Savanna, shrubland, rocky areas, and desert Diet: Shrubs

Subfamily Reduncinae – Knottnerus-Meyer, 1907 – three genera
Name	Authority and species	Range	Size and ecology
Kobus	Smith, 1840 Five species: K. ellipsiprymnus (waterbuck); K. kob (kob, pictured); K. leche (lechwe); K. megaceros (Nile lechwe); K. vardonii (puku)	Sub-Saharan Africa	Size range: 126 cm (50 in) long (puku) to 235 cm (93 in) long (waterbuck) Habitats: Savanna, shrubland, grassland, forest, and inland wetlands Diets: Grass, shrubs, and water plants
Pelea	Gray, 1851 One species: P. capreolus (grey rhebok)	Southern Africa	Size: 115–125 cm (45–49 in) long Habitats: Savanna and grassland Diet: Shrubs and forbs
Redunca (reedbuck)	H. Smith, 1827 Three species: R. arundinum (southern reedbuck); R. fulvorufula (mountain reedbuck); R. redunca (bohor reedbuck)	Sub-Saharan Africa	Size range: 100 cm (39 in) long, plus 13 cm (5 in) tail (mountain reedbuck) to 167 cm (66 in) long (southern reedbuck) Habitats: Savanna, shrubland, grassland, rocky areas, and inland wetlands Diets: Grass, as well as herbs and shrubs

===== Family Cervidae =====
Members of the Cervidae family are cervids, or colloquially deer. Cervidae comprises 53 extant species, divided into 19 genera. These genera are grouped into two subfamilies: Capreolinae, or New World deer, and Cervinae, or Old World deer.

Subfamily Capreolinae – Brookes, 1828 – ten genera
Name	Authority and species	Range	Size and ecology
Alces	J. E. Gray, 1821 One species: A. alces (moose)	North America, Europe, and Asia	Size: 230–340 cm (91–134 in) long, plus 8–12 cm (3–5 in) tail Habitats: Forest and inland wetlands Diet: Vegetative parts of trees, as well as shrubs, herbs, and aquatic plants
Blastocerus	Wagner, 1844 One species: B. dichotomus (marsh deer)	Scattered parts of central South America (former range in red)	Size: 153–191 cm (60–75 in) long, plus 12–16 cm (5–6 in) tail Habitats: Savanna, shrubland, and inland wetlands Diet: Grasses, reeds and aquatic plants, as well as shrubs and vines
Capreolus (roe deer)	J. E. Gray, 1821 Two species: C. capreolus (roe deer, pictured); C. pygargus (Siberian roe deer)	Europe and Asia	Size range: 95 cm (37 in) long, plus 20 cm (8 in) tail (Siberian roe deer) to 124 cm (49 in) long, plus 3 cm (1 in) tail (roe deer) Habitats: Forest, shrubland, grassland, and inland wetlands Diets: Wide variety of plants
Hippocamelus	Leuckart, 1816 Two species: H. antisensis (taruca, pictured); H. bisulcus (South Andean deer)	Western South America	Size range: 69–77 cm (27–30 in) tall at shoulder (taruca) to 156 cm (61 in) long, plus 13 cm (5 in) tail; 80–90 cm (31–35 in) tall at shoulder (South Andean deer) Habitats: Forest, shrubland, grassland, inland wetlands, rocky areas, and desert Diets: Sedges, grass, and other plants
Hydropotes	H. Milne-Edwards, 1872 One species: H. inermis (water deer)	East China and Korean peninsula	Size: 89–103 cm (35–41 in) long, plus 6–7 cm (2–3 in) tail; 45–57 cm (18–22 in) tall at shoulder Habitats: Forest, shrubland, grassland, inland wetlands, and intertidal marine Diet: Reeds, coarse grasses, vegetables, and beets
Mazama (brocket deer)	Rafinesque, 1817 Nine species: M. americana (red brocket, pictured); M. bricenii (Mérida brocket); M. bororo (small red brocket); M. chunyi (dwarf brocket); M. gouazoubira (gray brocket); M. nana (pygmy brocket); M. nemorivaga (Amazonian brown brocket); M. rufina (little red brocket); M. temama (Central American red brocket)	South America and Central America	Size range: 70 cm (28 in) long (dwarf brocket) to 146 cm (57 in) long, plus 15 cm (6 in) tail (red brocket) Habitats: Forest, shrubland, grassland, inland wetlands, and rocky areas Diets: Wide variety of plants and fruit
Odocoileus	Rafinesque, 1832 Three species: O. hemionus (mule deer); O. pandora (Yucatan brown brocket); O. virginianus (white-tailed deer, pictured)	North America and northern South America	Size range: 105 cm (41 in) long, plus 8 cm (3 in) tail (Yucatan brown brocket) to 203 cm (80 in) long (mule deer) Habitats: Forest, savanna, shrubland, grassland, inland wetlands, desert, neritic marine, intertidal marine, and coastal marine Diets: Wide variety of vegetation and grasses
Ozotoceros	Ameghino, 1891 One species: O. bezoarticus (Pampas deer)	Scattered central South America	Size: 110–140 cm (43–55 in) long; 70–75 cm (28–30 in) tall at shoulder Habitats: Savanna, grassland, and inland wetlands Diet: Grasses and shrubs
Pudu (pudú)	J. E. Gray, 1852 Two species: P. mephistophiles (northern pudú); P. puda (southern pudú, pictured)	Western South America	Size range: 60–85 cm (24–33 in) long, plus 3–5 cm (1–2 in) tail Habitats: Forest, shrubland, and grassland Diets: Leaves of ferns, trees, vines, herbs and shrubs
Rangifer	H. Smith, 1827 One species: R. tarandus (reindeer)	Arctic North America, Europe, and Asia	Size: 150–230 cm (59–91 in) long; up to 120 cm (47 in) tall at shoulder Habitats: Forest and grassland Diet: Lichen, forbs, sedges, grasses, and shrubs

Subfamily Cervinae – Goldfuss, 1820 – nine genera
Name	Authority and species	Range	Size and ecology
Axis	H. Smith, 1827 Four species: A. axis (chital, pictured); A. calamianensis (Calamian deer); A. kuhlii (Bawean deer); A. porcinus (Indian hog deer)	Southern and southeast Asia	Size range: 70 cm (28 in) long, plus 20 cm (8 in) tail (chital) to 175 cm (69 in) long, plus 38 cm (15 in) tail (Calamian deer) Habitats: Forest, savanna, shrubland, grassland, and inland wetlands Diets: Wide variety of grasses as well as fallen leaves, flowers, and fruit
Cervus	Linnaeus, 1758 Five species: C. albirostris (Thorold's deer); C. canadensis (elk); C. elaphus (red deer, pictured); C. hanglu (Central Asian red deer); C. nippon (sika deer)	Southern and southeast Asia	Size range: 95 cm (37 in) long, plus 7 cm (3 in) tail (sika deer) to 280 cm (110 in) long, plus 22 cm (9 in) tail (elk) Habitats: Forest, shrubland, grassland, rocky areas, and inland wetlands Diets: Shrub and tree shoots and branches, as well as grass, sedges, shrubs, fruit, and seeds
Dama	Frisch, 1775 Two species: D. dama (European fallow deer, pictured); D. mesopotamica (Persian fallow deer)	Europe and west Asia; introduced scattered areas worldwide	Size range: 130–175 cm (51–69 in) long, plus 15–23 cm (6–9 in) tail Habitats: Forest, shrubland, and grassland Diets: Grasses, mast, and shrubs, as well as leaves, buds, shoots, and bark
Elaphodus	H. Milne-Edwards, 1872 One species: E. cephalophus (tufted deer)	Central China and northeastern Myanmar	Size: 110–160 cm (43–63 in) long, plus 7–16 cm (3–6 in) tail Habitats: Forest and shrubland Diet: Grass, as well as shrubs, fruits, bamboo, and herbs
Elaphurus	Milne-Edwards, 1866 One species: E. davidianus (Père David's deer)	China	Size: 183–216 cm (72–85 in) long, plus 22–36 cm (9–14 in) tail Habitats: Grassland, inland wetlands, and intertidal marine Diet: Grass, reeds, and bush leaves
Muntiacus (muntjac)	Rafinesque, 1815 Twelve species: M. atherodes (Bornean yellow muntjac); M. crinifrons (hairy-fronted muntjac); M. feae (Fea's muntjac); M. gongshanensis (Gongshan muntjac); M. muntjak (southern red muntjac, pictured); M. puhoatensis (Pu Hoat muntjac); M. putaoensis (leaf muntjac); M. reevesi (Reeves's muntjac); M. rooseveltorum (Roosevelt's muntjac); M. truongsonensis (Truong Son muntjac); M. vuquangensis (giant muntjac); M. vaginalis (northern red muntjac)	South and southeast Asia; introduced to Britain	Size range: 70 cm (28 in) long, plus 10 cm (4 in) tail (Reeves's muntjac) to 135 cm (53 in) long, plus 23 cm (9 in) tail (Northern red muntjac) Habitats: Forest, shrubland, and grassland Diets: Fruit and a range of plant materials
Panolia	McClelland, 1842 One species: P. eldii (Eld's deer)	Scattered parts of south and southeast Asia	Size range: 140–170 cm (55–67 in) long, plus 22–25 cm (9–10 in) tail Habitats: Forest, savanna, shrubland, grassland, and inland wetlands Diets: A variety of grass, fruit, and herbaceous and wetland plants
Rucervus	Hodgson, 1838 Two species: R. duvaucelii (barasingha, pictured); R. schomburgki (Schomburgk's deer†)	Scattered parts of south and southeast Asia	Size range: 140 cm (55 in) long, plus 22 cm (9 in) tail (Eld's deer) to 180 cm (71 in) long (barasingha) Habitats: Forest, savanna, shrubland, grassland, and inland wetlands Diets: A variety of grass, fruit, and herbaceous and wetland plants
Rusa	H. Smith, 1827 Four species: R. alfredi (Visayan spotted deer); R. marianna (Philippine deer); R. timorensis (Javan rusa); R. unicolor (sambar deer, pictured)	South and Southeast Asia	Size range: 100 cm (39 in) long (Philippine deer) to 270 cm (106 in) long, plus 30 cm (12 in) tail (sambar deer) Habitats: Forest, savanna, shrubland, grassland, and inland wetlands Diets: Wide variety of plants

===== Family Giraffidae =====
Members of the Giraffidae family are giraffids, and are the giraffes and the okapi. Giraffidae comprises five extant species in two genera.

Not assigned to a named subfamily – two genera
Name	Authority and species	Range	Size and ecology
Giraffa (giraffe)	Brisson, 1762 Four species: G. camelopardalis (northern giraffe); G. giraffa (southern giraffe, pictured); G. reticulata (reticulated giraffe); G. tippelskirchii (Masai giraffe)	Scattered Sub-Saharan Africa (species shown as subspecies)	Size range: 380–470 cm (150–185 in) long, plus 78–100 cm (31–39 in) tail; 600–1,800 kg (1,323–3,968 lb) Habitats: Forest, savanna, shrubland Diets: Leaves, stems, flowers, and fruit
Okapia	Lankester, 1901 One species: O. johnstoni (okapi)	Democratic Republic of the Congo in Central Africa	Size: 200–220 cm (79–87 in) long, plus 30–42 cm (12–17 in) tail; 200–350 kg (441–772 lb) Habitats: Forest Diet: Leaves

===== Family Moschidae =====
Members of the Moschidae family are moschids, or colloquially musk deer. Moschidae contains seven extant species in a single genus.

Not assigned to a named subfamily – one genus
Name	Authority and species	Range	Size and ecology
Moschus (musk deer)	Linnaeus, 1758 Seven species: M. anhuiensis (Anhui musk deer); M. berezovskii (dwarf musk deer); M. chrysogaster (alpine musk deer); M. cupreus (Kashmir musk deer); M. fuscus (black musk deer); M. leucogaster (white-bellied musk deer); M. moschiferus (Siberian musk deer, pictured)	Southern Asia	Size range: 80–100 cm (31–39 in) long, plus 4–6 cm (2–2 in) tail Habitats: Forest, shrubland, grassland, and rocky areas Diets: Leaves, flowers, shoots, and grass, as well as twigs, moss, and lichen

==== Family Tragulidae ====
Members of the Tragulidae family are tragulids, or colloquially chevrotains or mouse-deer. Tragulidae contains 10 extant species in 3 genera.

Not assigned to a named subfamily – three genera
Name	Authority and species	Range	Size and ecology
Hyemoschus	Brisson, 1762 One species: H. aquaticus (water chevrotain)	Central and western Africa	Size: 45–85 cm (18–33 in) long, plus 7–17 cm (3–7 in) tail Habitat: Forest Diet: Tree and shrub leaves, fruit, and buds
Moschiola (spotted chevrotain)	J. E. Gray, 1845 Three species: M. indica (Indian spotted chevrotain, pictured); M. kathygre (yellow-striped chevrotain); M. meminna (Sri Lankan spotted chevrotain)	Southern Asia (in red)	Size range: 50–56 cm (20–22 in) long, plus 2–3 cm (1–1 in) tail Habitats: Forest, savanna, shrubland, grassland, inland wetlands, and marine Diets: Herbs, shrubs, and fruit
Tragulus (mouse-deer)	J. E. Gray, 1845 Six species: T. javanicus (Java mouse-deer, pictured); T. kanchil (lesser mouse-deer); T. napu (greater mouse-deer); T. nigricans (Philippine mouse-deer); T. versicolor (Vietnam mouse-deer); T. williamsoni (Williamson's mouse-deer)	Southeastern Asia (in green)	Size range: 40–58 cm (16–23 in) long, plus 6–10 cm (2–4 in) tail Habitats: Forest, savanna, shrubland, grassland, and inland wetlands Diets: Fruit, as well as shoots and young leaves

=== Suborder Suina ===
==== Family Suidae ====
Members of the Suidae family are suids, or colloquially pigs, hogs, or boars. Suidae comprises 17 extant species, divided into 6 genera, and is not split into subfamilies.

Not assigned to a named subfamily – six genera
Name	Authority and species	Range	Size and ecology
Babyrousa (deer-pig)	Perry, 1811 Three species: B. babyrussa (Buru babirusa); B. celebensis (North Sulawesi babirusa, pictured); B. togeanensis (Togian babirusa)	Indonesia	Size range: 85–110 cm (33–43 in) long, plus 20–32 cm (8–13 in) tail (Buru babirusa and North Sulawesi babirusa) Habitats: Forest, inland wetlands, and intertidal marine Diets: Fruit and browse, as well as rhizomes, tamarinds, cacao, herbs, and vegetables
Hylochoerus	Thomas, 1904 One species: H. meinertzhageni (giant forest hog)	Scattered central Africa	Size: 130–210 cm (51–83 in) long, plus 25–45 cm (10–18 in) tail Habitat: Forest Diet: Large variety of plants, particularly herbaceous plants
Phacochoerus (warthog)	F. Cuvier, 1826 Two species: P. aethiopicus (desert warthog); P. africanus (common warthog, pictured)	Sub-saharan Africa	Size range: 90–150 cm (35–59 in) long (common warthog) Habitats: Forest, savanna, shrubland, and grassland Diets: Grass, shrubs, and tubers, as well as fruit, insects, roots, berries, bark, and carrion
Porcula	Hodgson, 1847 One species: P. salvania (pygmy hog)	Southern Bhutan and northwest India	Size: 55–71 cm (22–28 in) long, plus tail Habitat: Grassland Diet: Roots, grass, tubers, and invertebrates
Potamochoerus (bushpig)	J. E. Gray, 1854 Two species: P. larvatus (bushpig, pictured); P. porcus (red river hog)	Sub-Saharan Africa	Size range: 100–150 cm (39–59 in) long, plus 30–40 cm (12–16 in) tail (red river hog) Habitats: Forest and shrubland Diets: Roots, tubers, fruit, seeds, invertebrates, small vertebrates, and carrion
Sus (pig)	Linnaeus, 1758 Eight species: S. ahoenobarbus (Palawan bearded pig); S. barbatus (Bornean bearded pig); S. cebifrons (Visayan warty pig); S. celebensis (Celebes warty pig); S. oliveri (Oliver's warty pig); S. philippensis (Philippine warty pig); S. verrucosus (Javan warty pig); S. scrofa (wild boar, pictured)	Southeast Asia, with wild boar in Eurasia and North Africa and introduced to parts of United States, South America, and Oceania	Size range: 80 cm (31 in) long (Celebes warty pig) to 200 cm (79 in) long, plus 40 cm (16 in) tail (wild boar) Habitats: Forest, savanna, shrubland, grassland, inland wetlands, neritic marine, intertidal marine, and desert Diets: Omnivorous; wide variety of plants and small vertebrates

==== Family Tayassuidae ====
Members of the Tayassuidae family are tayassuids, or colloquially peccaries. Tayassuidae comprises 3 extant species in 3 genera, and is not split into subfamilies.

Not assigned to a named subfamily – three genera
Name	Authority and species	Range	Size and ecology
Catagonus	Ameghino, 1904 One species: C. wagneri (Chacoan peccary)	Gran Chaco region of central South America	Size: 96–118 cm (38–46 in) long Habitats: Savanna and shrubland Diet: Cacti, as well as roots, fruit, and forbs
Dicotyles	Linnaeus, 1758 One species: D. tajacu (collared peccary)	South America, Central America, Trinidad in the Caribbean, and southern North America	Size: 80–100 cm (31–39 in) long Habitats: Forest, savanna, shrubland, grassland, and desert Diet: Roots, tubers, fruits, seeds, as well as green plants, insects, and small animals
Tayassu	Fischer von Waldheim, 1814 One species: T. pecari (white-lipped peccary)	South America and Central America	Size: 75–100 cm (30–39 in) long, plus 1–6 cm (0–2 in) tail Habitats: Forest, savanna, shrubland, and grassland Diet: Fruit, as well as a variety of plants, invertebrates, fungi and fish

=== Suborder Tylopoda ===
==== Family Camelidae ====
Members of the Camelidae family are camelids, and include camels, llamas, and alpacas. Camelidae contains 7 extant species in 2 genera.

Not assigned to a named subfamily – two genera
Name	Authority and species	Range	Size and ecology
Camelus (camel)	Linnaeus, 1758 Three species: C. bactrianus (Bactrian camel); C. dromedarius (dromedary, pictured); C. ferus (wild Bactrian camel)	Northern Africa, Middle East, central Asia, central Australia	Size range: 220 cm (87 in) long, plus 20 cm (8 in) tail (dromedary) to 320 cm (126 in) long, plus 25 cm (10 in) tail (wild Bactrian camel) Habitat: Desert Diets: Wide variety of plants, as well as carrion
Lama	Cuvier, 1800 Four species: L. glama (llama); L. guanicoe (guanaco); L. pacos (alpaca, pictured); L. vicugna (vicuña)	Western and southern South America	Size range: 90 cm (35 in) long, plus 24 cm (9 in) tail (guanaco) to 225 cm (89 in) long, plus 25 cm (10 in) tail (alpaca) Habitats: Shrubland, grassland, inland wetlands, and desert Diets: Grass, forbs, shrubs, and lichen

=== Suborder Whippomorpha ===
==== Infraorder Cetacea ====
===== Parvorder Mysticeti =====
====== Family Balaenidae ======
Members of the Balaenidae family are balaenids, or colloquially right whales. Balaenidae contains four species in two genera.

Not assigned to a named subfamily – two genera
Name	Authority and species	Range	Size and ecology
Balaena	Linnaeus, 1758 One species: B. mysticetus (bowhead whale)	Arctic and subarctic ocean	Size: 18–20 m (59–66 ft) long; 98 tons Habitats: Neritic marine and oceanic marine Diet: Small crustaceans and other zooplankton
Eubalaena (right whale)	J. E. Gray, 1864 Three species: E. australis (southern right whale); E. glacialis (North Atlantic right whale, pictured); E. japonica (North Pacific right whale)	Subarctic and Antarctic ocean (southern right whale in yellow, North Atlantic right whale in green, North Pacific right whale in blue)	Size range: 11–18 m (36–59 ft) long; 54–73 tons Habitats: Neritic marine and oceanic marine Diets: Copepods and krill, as well as other zooplankton

====== Family Balaenopteridae ======
Members of the Balaenopteridae family are balaenopterids, or colloquially rorquals. Balaenopteridae contains ten species in two genera.

Not assigned to a named subfamily – two genera
Name	Authority and species	Range	Size and ecology
Balaenoptera	Linnaeus, 1758 Nine species: B. acutorostrata (common minke whale); B. bonaerensis (Antarctic minke whale); B. borealis (sei whale); B. brydei (Bryde's whale); B. edeni (Eden's whale); B. musculus (blue whale); B. physalus (fin whale, pictured); B. ricei (Rice's whale); B. omurai (Omura's whale)	Worldwide oceans	Size range: 7 m (23 ft) long and 5 tons (common minke whale) to 27 m (89 ft) long and 120 tons (blue whale) Habitats: Neritic marine and oceanic marine Diets: Fish, crustaceans, and cephalopods
Megaptera	J. E. Gray, 1864 One species: M. novaeangliae (humpback whale)	Worldwide oceans	Size: 11.5–15 m (38–49 ft) long; 25–30 tons Habitats: Neritic marine and oceanic marine Diet: Krill and crustaceans, as well as fish

====== Family Cetotheriidae ======
Members of the Cetotheriidae family are cetotheriids; the only extant species is the pygmy right whale.

Not assigned to a named subfamily – one genus
Name	Authority and species	Range	Size and ecology
Caperea	J. E. Gray, 1864 One species: C. marginata (pygmy right whale)	Sub-Antarctic oceans	Size: 5.5–6.5 m (18–21 ft) long; 3–3.5 tons Habitats: Neritic marine and oceanic marine Diet: Copepods as well as other zooplankton

====== Family Eschrichtiidae ======
Members of the Eschrichtiidae family are eschrichtiids; the only extant species is the gray whale.

Not assigned to a named subfamily – one genus
Name	Authority and species	Range	Size and ecology
Eschrichtius	J. E. Gray, 1846 One species: E. robustus (gray whale)	Northern Pacific oceans	Size: 12–14 m (39–46 ft) long; 15–35 tons Habitats: Neritic marine and oceanic marine Diet: Mysids, tube-dwelling amphipods, and Polychaete tube worms, as well as other crustaceans and zooplankton

===== Parvorder Odontoceti =====
====== Family Delphinidae ======
Members of the Delphinidae family are delphinids, or colloquially oceanic dolphins. Delphinidae contains 37 species in 19 genera, which are grouped into four named subfamilies: Delphininae, Lissodelphininae, Globicephalinae, and Orcininae, as well as one unnamed group.

Subfamily Delphininae – LeDuc, 1997 – six genera
Name	Authority and species	Range	Size and ecology
Delphinus	Linnaeus, 1758 One species: D. delphis (common dolphin)	Tropical and temperate Pacific, Atlantic and Indian Oceans	Size: 170–240 cm (67–94 in) long; 70–110 kg (154–243 lb) Habitats: Neritic marine and oceanic marine Diet: Epipelagic and mesopelagic fish as well as squid
Lagenodelphis	Fraser, 1956 One species: L. hosei (Fraser's dolphin)	Tropical and temperate Pacific, Atlantic and Indian Oceans	Size: 200–260 cm (79–102 in) long; 160–210 kg (353–463 lb) Habitats: Neritic marine and oceanic marine Diet: Mesopelagic fish, cephalopods, and crustaceans
Sotalia	J. E. Gray, 1866 Two species: S. fluviatilis (tucuxi, pictured); S. guianensis (Guiana dolphin)	Northern and eastern South American coast and Amazon basin rivers	Size range: 130–180 cm (51–71 in) long; 35–45 kg (77–99 lb) Habitats: Neritic marine, coastal marine, and inland wetlands Diets: Fish, cephalopods, and shrimp
Sousa (humpback dolphin)	J. E. Gray, 1866 Four species: S. chinensis (Indo-Pacific humpback dolphin); S. plumbea (Indian Ocean humpback dolphin, pictured); S. sahulensis (Australian humpback dolphin); S. teuszii (Atlantic humpback dolphin)	Western African coast; Indian Ocean coasts; western Pacific Ocean	Size range: 200 cm (79 in) long and 100 kg (220 lb) (Indo-Pacific humpback dolphin) to 280 cm (110 in) long and 200 kg (441 lb) (Atlantic humpback dolphin) Habitats: Neritic marine, coastal marine, intertidal marine, oceanic marine, and inland wetlands Diets: Wide variety of coastal fish, as well as cephalopods
Stenella (spotted dolphin)	J. E. Gray, 1866 Five species: S. attenuata (pantropical spotted dolphin); S. clymene (Clymene dolphin); S. coeruleoalba (striped dolphin); S. frontalis (Atlantic spotted dolphin, pictured); S. longirostris (spinner dolphin)	Worldwide tropical and temperate oceans	Size range: 130 cm (51 in) long and 45 kg (99 lb) (spinner dolphin) to 250 cm (98 in) long and 150 kg (331 lb) (striped dolphin) Habitats: Neritic marine and oceanic marine Diets: Small fish, squid, and shrimp
Tursiops (bottlenose dolphin)	Gervais, 1855 Two species: T. aduncus (Indo-Pacific bottlenose dolphin); T. truncatus (common bottlenose dolphin, pictured)	Worldwide tropical and temperate oceans	Size range: 190–390 cm (75–154 in) long; 150–650 kg (331–1,433 lb) Habitats: Neritic marine, coastal marine, oceanic marine, and inland wetlands Diets: Wide variety of fish and cephalopods, as well as shrimp and crustaceans

Subfamily Lissodelphininae – Rice, 1984 – two genera
Name	Authority and species	Range	Size and ecology
Cephalorhynchus	J. E. Gray, 1846 Four species: C. commersonii (Commerson's dolphin, pictured); C. eutropia (Chilean dolphin); C. heavisidii (Heaviside's dolphin); C. hectori (Hector's dolphin)	Southern South American coast, southwestern African coast, New Zealand coast, and Kerguelen Islands in Indian Ocean	Size range: 120 cm (47 in) long and 30 kg (66 lb) (Chilean dolphin) to 170 cm (67 in) long and 75 kg (165 lb) (Heaviside's dolphin) Habitats: Neritic marine and oceanic marine Diets: Small fish, cephalopods, crustaceans, and benthic invertebrates
Lissodelphis (right whale dolphin)	Gloger, 1841 Two species: L. borealis (northern right whale dolphin, pictured); L. peronii (southern right whale dolphin)	Temperate north Pacific Ocean and temperate to sub-Antarctic Pacific and Atlantic Oceans	Size range: 180 cm (71 in) long and 60 kg (132 lb) (southern right whale dolphin) to 300 cm (118 in) long and 100 kg (220 lb) (Northern right whale dolphin) Habitats: Neritic marine and oceanic marine Diets: Squid and fish

Subfamily Globicephalinae – LeDuc, 1997 – seven genera
Name	Authority and species	Range	Size and ecology
Feresa	J. E. Gray, 1870 One species: F. attenuata (pygmy killer whale)	Worldwide tropical and subtropical oceans	Size: 210–260 cm (83–102 in) long; 110–170 kg (243–375 lb) Habitat: Oceanic marine Diet: Fish and cephalopods
Globicephala (pilot whale)	Lesson, 1828 Two species: G. macrorhynchus (short-finned pilot whale); G. melas (long-finned pilot whale, pictured)	Worldwide oceans (short-finned in blue, long-finned in green)	Size range: 360–650 cm (142–256 in) long; 1–4 tons Habitat: Oceanic marine Diets: Squid, as well as small and medium fish and shrimp
Grampus	J. E. Gray, 1828 One species: G. griseus (Risso's dolphin)	Worldwide tropical and temperate ocean continental shelves	Size: 260–380 cm (102–150 in) long; 300–500 kg (661–1,102 lb) Habitat: Oceanic marine Diet: Cephalopods
Orcaella (snubfin dolphin)	Lesson, 1866 Two species: O. brevirostris (Irrawaddy dolphin, pictured); O. heinsohni (Australian snubfin dolphin)	Southeast Asian and northern Australian coasts	Size range: 210–260 cm (83–102 in) long; 90–150 kg (198–331 lb) Habitats: Neretic marine, coastal marine, and inland wetlands Diets: Fish, as well as squid and shrimp
Peponocephala	Nishiwaki, Norris, 1966 One species: P. electra (melon-headed whale)	Worldwide tropical and subtropical oceans	Size: 210–270 cm (83–106 in) long; about 160 kg (353 lb) Habitat: Oceanic marine Diet: Mesopelagic fish, squid, and shrimp
Pseudorca	Reinhardt, 1862 One species: P. crassidens (false killer whale)	Worldwide tropical and temperate oceans	Size: 430–600 cm (169–236 in) long; 1.1–2.2 tons Habitats: Neritic marine and oceanic marine Diet: Large fish and cephalopods
Steno	J. E. Gray, 1846 One species: S. bredanensis (rough-toothed dolphin)	Worldwide tropical and temperate oceans	Size: 210–260 cm (83–102 in) long; 100–150 kg (220–331 lb) Habitats: Neritic marine and oceanic marine Diet: Fish and cephalopods

Subfamily Orcininae – Rice, 1967 – one genus
Name	Authority and species	Range	Size and ecology
Orcinus	Fitzinger, 1860 One species: O. orca (killer whale)	Worldwide oceans	Size: 550–980 cm (217–386 in) long; 2.6–9 tons Habitats: Neritic marine and oceanic marine Diet: Wide variety of prey, including marine mammals, seabirds, sea turtles, many species of fish, sharks, rays, and cephalopods

Not assigned to a named subfamily – one genus
Name	Authority and species	Range	Size and ecology
Lagenorhynchus	Cope, 1866 Six species: L. albirostris (white-beaked dolphin); L. acutus (Atlantic white-sided dolphin); L. australis (Peale's dolphin); L. cruciger (hourglass dolphin); L. obliquidens (Pacific white-sided dolphin); L. obscurus (dusky dolphin, pictured)	Temperate and subarctic northern Atlantic Ocean, Sub-Antarctic Pacific and Atlantic Oceans, temperate north Pacific Ocean, and scattered southern hemisphere coasts	Size range: 150 cm (59 in) long and 50 kg (110 lb) (dusky dolphin) to 270 cm (106 in) long and 275 kg (606 lb) (White-beaked dolphin) Habitats: Neritic marine and oceanic marine Diets: Wide variety of fish and cephalopods

====== Family Iniidae ======
Members of the Iniidae family are inniids, and are part of a grouping colloquially termed river dolphins along with Lipotidae, Platanistidae and Pontoporiidae. Iniidae contains four species in one genus.

Not assigned to a named subfamily – one genus
Name	Authority and species	Range	Size and ecology
Inia	d'Orbigny, 1834 Four species: I. araguaiaensis (Araguaian river dolphin); I. boliviensis (Bolivian river dolphin); I. geoffrensis (Amazon river dolphin, pictured); I. humboldtiana (Orinoco river dolphin)	Amazon rivers in South America (Araguaian river dolphin in blue, Amazon and Orinoco river dolphins in green, and Bolivian river dolphin in purple)	Size range: 180–250 cm (71–98 in) long; 85–160 kg (187–353 lb) Habitat: Inland wetlands Diets: Fish, as well as shrimp

====== Family Kogiidae ======
Members of the Kogiidae family are kogiids, and are part of the sperm whale superfamily Physeteroidea; the family contains two species in one genus.

Not assigned to a named subfamily – one genus
Name	Authority and species	Range	Size and ecology
Kogia	G. R. Gray, 1864 Two species: K. breviceps (pygmy sperm whale); K. sima (dwarf sperm whale, pictured)	Worldwide tropical and temperate oceans	Size range: 210 cm (83 in) long and 135 kg (298 lb) (dwarf sperm whale) to 340 cm (134 in) long and 400 kg (882 lb) (pygmy sperm whale) Habitat: Oceanic marine Diets: Cephalopods, as well as fish, shrimp, and crabs

====== Family Lipotidae ======
Members of the Lipotidae family are lipotids and are part of the river dolphin grouping along with Iniidae, Platanistidae and Pontoporiidae; the only extant species is the baiji.

Not assigned to a named subfamily – one genus
Name	Authority and species	Range	Size and ecology
Lipotes	Miller, 1918 One species: L. vexillifer (baiji)	Yangtze river in China	Size: 140–250 cm (55–98 in) long; 100–160 kg (220–353 lb) Habitat: Inland wetlands Diet: Fish

====== Family Monodontidae ======
Members of the Monodontidae family are monodontids and comprises two living whale species in two genera, the narwhal and the beluga whale.

Not assigned to a named subfamily – one genus
Name	Authority and species	Range	Size and ecology
Delphinapterus	Lacépède, 1804 One species: D. leucas (beluga whale)	Arctic and subarctic oceans	Size: 300–500 cm (118–197 in) long; 0.4–1.5 tons Habitats: Neritic marine and oceanic marine Diet: Fish, as well as mollusks and benthic crustaceans
Monodon	Lacépède, 1804 One species: M. monoceros (narwhal)	Arctic ocean	Size: 380–500 cm (150–197 in) long; 0.8–1.6 tons Habitats: Neritic marine and oceanic marine Diet: Fish, squid, and shrimp

====== Family Phocoenidae ======
Members of the Phocoenidae family are phocoenids, or colloquially porpoises. Phocoenidae contains eight species in three genera.

Not assigned to a named subfamily – three genera
Name	Authority and species	Range	Size and ecology
Neophocaena (finless porpoise)	Palmer, 1899 Three species: N. asiaeorientalis (Yangtze finless porpoise); N. phocaenoides (Indo-Pacific finless porpoise); N. sunameri (East Asian finless porpoise, pictured)	Asian coasts	Size range: 120–190 cm (47–75 in) long; 30–45 kg (66–99 lb) Habitats: Inland wetlands, neritic marine, oceanic marine, intertidal marine, and coastal marine Diets: Small fish, cephalopods, and crustaceans
Phocoena	Cuvier, 1816 Four species: P. dioptrica (spectacled porpoise); P. phocoena (harbour porpoise, pictured); P. sinus (vaquita); P. spinipinnis (Burmeister's porpoise)	North Atlantic, North Pacific, and Antarctic oceans, Black Sea, and South American coast	Size range: 130–220 cm (51–87 in) long; 60–84 kg (132–185 lb) (spectacled porpoise) Habitats: Neritic marine and oceanic marine Diets: Fish, shrimp, squid, and crustaceans
Phocoenoides	(Andrews, 1911) One species: P. dalli (Dall's porpoise)	North Pacific ocean	Size: 170–220 cm (67–87 in) long; 135–220 kg (298–485 lb) (spectacled porpoise) Habitats: Neritic marine and oceanic marine Diet: Wide variety of fish, squid

====== Family Physeteridae ======
Members of the Physeteridae family are physeterids, and are part of the sperm whale superfamily Physeteroidea; the only extant species is the sperm whale.

Not assigned to a named subfamily – one genus
Name	Authority and species	Range	Size and ecology
Physeter	Linnaeus, 1758 One species: P. macrocephalus (sperm whale)	Worldwide oceans (concentrations in black)	Size: 11–18 m (36–59 ft) long; 20–50 tons Habitats: Neritic marine and oceanic marine Diet: Deep-water squid

====== Family Platanistidae ======
Members of the Platanistidae family are platanistids, and are part of a grouping colloquially termed river dolphins along with Iniidae, Lipotidae, and Pontoporiidae. Platanistidae contains two species in one genus.

Not assigned to a named subfamily – one genus
Name	Authority and species	Range	Size and ecology
Platanista (South Asian river dolphin)	Wagler, 1830 Two species: P. gangetica (Ganges river dolphin, pictured); P. minor (Indus river dolphin)	Rivers of the Ganges Basin (orange) and the Indus Basin (blue)	Size range: 150–250 cm (59–98 in) long; 70–90 kg (154–198 lb) Habitats: Neritic marine and inland wetlands Diets: Fish and shrimp

====== Family Pontoporiidae ======
Members of the Pontoporiidae family are pontoporiids, and are part of a grouping colloqially termed river dolphins along with Iniidae, Lipotidae, and Platanistidae. The only extant species is the La Plata dolphin.

Not assigned to a named subfamily – one genus
Name	Authority and species	Range	Size and ecology
Pontoporia	J. E. Gray, 1846 One species: P. blainvillei (La Plata dolphin)	Southeastern South American coast	Size: 130–170 cm (51–67 in) long; 30–53 kg (66–117 lb) Habitats: Neritic marine and oceanic marine Diet: Fish, cephalopods, and crustaceans

====== Family Ziphiidae ======
Members of the Ziphiidae family are ziphiids, or colloquially beaked whales. Ziphiidae contains 23 species in 6 genera, which are grouped into three named subfamilies: Berardiinae, Hyperoodontinae, and Ziphiinae.

Subfamily Berardiinae – Moore, 1968 – one genus
Name	Authority and species	Range	Size and ecology
Berardius (four-toothed whale)	Duvernoy, 1851 Three species: B. arnuxii (Arnoux's beaked whale, pictured); B. bairdii (Baird's beaked whale); B. minimus (Sato's beaked whale)	Antarctic, subantarctic, and north Pacific oceans	Size range: 7.8 m (26 ft) long and 7 tons (Arnoux's beaked whale) to 12.8 m (42 ft) long and 16 tons (Baird's beaked whale) Habitat: Oceanic marine Diets: Deepwater and pelagic fish, cephalopods, and crustaceans

Subfamily Hyperoodontinae – J. E. Gray, 1846 – three genera
Name	Authority and species	Range	Size and ecology
Hyperoodon (bottlenose whale)	Lacépède, 1804 Two species: H. ampullatus (northern bottlenose whale, pictured); H. planifrons (southern bottlenose whale)	Antarctic, subantarctic, and north Atlantic oceans	Size range: 6–9 m (20–30 ft) long; 5.8–8 tons Habitat: Oceanic marine Diets: Squid, as well as fish, sea cucumbers, starfish, and prawns
Indopacetus	Moore, 1968 One species: I. pacificus (tropical bottlenose whale)	Small ocean regions near Horn of Africa and Australia	Size: 7–7.5 m (23–25 ft) long Habitat: Oceanic marine Diet: Squid
Mesoplodon (mesoplodont whale)	Gervais, 1850 Fifteen species: M. bidens (Sowerby's beaked whale); M. bowdoini (Andrews' beaked whale); M. carlhubbsi (Hubbs' beaked whale); M. densirostris (Blainville's beaked whale); M. europaeus (Gervais' beaked whale, pictured); M. ginkgodens (ginkgo-toothed beaked whale); M. grayi (Gray's beaked whale); M. hectori (Hector's beaked whale); M. hotaula (Deraniyagala's beaked whale); M. layardii (strap-toothed whale); M. mirus (True's beaked whale); M. perrini (Perrin's beaked whale); M. peruvianus (pygmy beaked whale); M. stejnegeri (Stejneger's beaked whale); M. traversii (spade-toothed whale)	Worldwide tropical and temperate oceans	Size range: 3.4 m (11 ft) long (pygmy beaked whale) to 6.2 m (20 ft) long and 3 tons (strap-toothed whale) Habitat: Oceanic marine Diets: Squid, fish, and crustaceans

Subfamily Ziphiinae – J. E. Gray, 1850 – two genera
Name	Authority and species	Range	Size and ecology
Tasmacetus	Oliver, 1937 One species: T. shepherdi (Shepherd's beaked whale)	Sub-Antarctic ocean	Size: 6–7 m (20–23 ft) long; 2–3 tons Habitat: Oceanic marine Diet: Fish, as well as squid and crabs
Ziphius	Cuvier, 1823 One species: Z. cavirostris (Cuvier's beaked whale)	Worldwide tropical and temperate ocean	Size: 5.5–7 m (18–23 ft) long; 2–3 tons Habitat: Oceanic marine Diet: Deep-sea squid, as well as fish and crustaceans

==== Family Hippopotamidae ====
Members of the Hippopotamidae family are hippopotamids, or colloquially hippopotamuses or hippos. Hippopotamidae contains 2 species in 2 genera.

Not assigned to a named subfamily – two genera
Name	Authority and species	Range	Size and ecology
Choeropsis	Leidy, 1853 One species: C. liberiensis (pygmy hippopotamus)	Scattered western Africa	Size: 150–175 cm (59–69 in) long, plus a tail of about 20 cm (8 in); 160–275 kg (353–606 lb) Habitats: Forest, savanna, inland wetlands Diet: Variety of terrestrial and semi-aquatic plants
Hippopotamus	Linnaeus, 1758 One species: H. amphibius (hippopotamus)	Scattered sub-Saharan Africa	Size: 209–505 cm (82–199 in) long, including a tail of about 35 cm (14 in); 1,300–3,200 kg (2,866–7,055 lb) Habitats: Forest, savanna, shrubland, grassland, inland wetlands, neritic marine, coastal marine Diet: Grass

== See also ==
- Mammal classification
- List of bovids

== Sources ==
- Armstrong, David M.; Fitzgerald, James P.; Meaney, Carron A. (2011). Mammals of Colorado (2nd ed.). University Press of Colorado. ISBN 978-1-60732-048-7.
- Burnie, David (2017). Animal: The Definitive Visual Guide. DK. ISBN 978-1-4654-7086-7.
- Burt, William Henry (1957). Mammals of the Great Lakes Region. University of Michigan Press. ISBN 978-0-472-06183-9.
- Carwardine, Mark (2002). Whales, Dolphins, and Porpoises. DK. ISBN 978-0-7894-8990-6.
- Castelló, José R. (2016). Bovids of the World: Antelopes, Gazelles, Cattle, Goats, Sheep, and Relatives. Princeton University Press. ISBN 978-0-691-16717-6.
- Eisenberg, John F.; Redford, Kent H.; Reid, Fiona; Bonner, Sigrid James (1989). Mammals of the Neotropics. Vol. 2: The Southern Cone: Chile, Argentina, Uruguay, Paraguay. University of Chicago Press. ISBN 978-0-226-19542-1.
- Eisenberg, John F.; Redford, Kent H.; Reid, Fiona; Bonner, Sigrid James (1989). Mammals of the Neotropics. Vol. 3: Ecuador, Bolivia, Brazil. University of Chicago Press. ISBN 978-0-226-19542-1.
- Emanoil, Mary, ed. (1994). Encyclopedia of Endangered Species. Vol. 1. Gale Research. ISBN 978-0-8103-8857-4.
- Francis, Charles (2019). Field Guide to the Mammals of South-East Asia (2nd ed.). Bloomsbury Publishing. ISBN 978-1-4729-3499-4.
- Geist, Valerius (1998). Deer of the World: Their Evolution, Behaviour, and Ecology. Stackpole Books. ISBN 978-0-8117-0496-0.
- Harris, Tim (2018). The Encyclopedia of Animals. Chartwell Books. ISBN 978-0-7858-3646-9.
- Kingdon, Jonathan (2013). The Kingdon Field Guide to African Mammals (1st ed.). Bloomsbury Publishing. ISBN 978-1-4081-7481-4.
- Kingdon, Jonathan (2020). The Kingdon Pocket Guide to African Mammals (2nd ed.). Bloomsbury Publishing. ISBN 978-1-4729-8320-6.
- Long, John L. (2003). Introduced Mammals of the World: Their History, Distribution and Influence. CABI Publishing. ISBN 978-0-643-06714-1.
- Macdonald, David W. (1984). The Encyclopedia of Mammals. Equinox. ISBN 978-0-87196-871-5.
- Melletti, Mario; Meijaard, Erik, eds. (2017). Ecology, Conservation and Management of Wild Pigs and Peccaries. Cambridge University Press. ISBN 978-1-316-95340-2.
- IUCN/SSC Hippo Specialist Group; IUCN/SSC Pigs and Peccaries Specialist Group (1993). Oliver, William L. R. (ed.). Pigs, Peccaries, and Hippos: Status Survey and Conservation Action Plan. International Union for Conservation of Nature. ISBN 978-2-8317-0141-7.
- Perrin, W. F.; Wursig, B.; Thewissen, J. G. M., eds. (2008). Encyclopedia of Marine Mammals. Elsevier Science. ISBN 978-0-12-373553-9.
- Reid, Fiona (2009). A Field Guide to the Mammals of Central America and Southeast Mexico (2nd ed.). Oxford University Press. ISBN 978-0-19-534322-9.
- Saha, Goutam Kumar; Mazumdar, Subhendu (2008). Threatened Mammals of India: Ecology and Management. Daya Publishing House. ISBN 978-81-7035-546-5.
- Schaller, George B. (2009). The Deer and the Tiger: Study of Wild Life in India. University of Chicago Press. ISBN 978-0-226-73657-0.
- Smith, Andrew T.; Xie, Yan, eds. (2013). Mammals of China. Princeton University Press. ISBN 978-1-4008-4688-7.
- Wijeyeratne, Gehan de Silva (2016). Mammals of Sri Lanka. Bloomsbury Publishing. ISBN 978-1-4729-3289-1.
- Wilson, Don E.; Mittermeier, Russell A., eds. (2011). Handbook of the Mammals of the World. Vol. 2 (Hoofed Mammals). Lynx Edicions. ISBN 978-84-96553-77-4.
- Grubb, Peter (2005). Wilson, Don E.; Reeder, DeeAnn M. (eds.). Mammal Species of the World. Vol. 1 (3rd ed.). Johns Hopkins University Press. ISBN 978-0-8018-8221-0.
