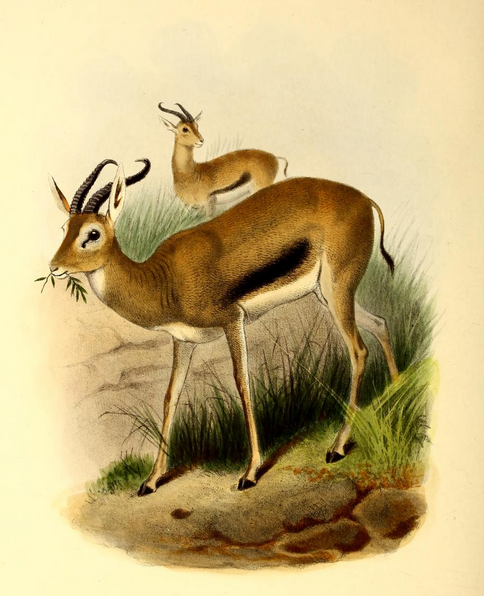
- Illustration by Philip Sclater in The Book of Antelopes (1894)

Conservation status
- Endangered (IUCN 3.1)

Scientific classification
- Kingdom: Animalia
- Phylum: Chordata
- Class: Mammalia
- Order: Artiodactyla
- Family: Bovidae
- Subfamily: Antilopinae
- Genus: Eudorcas
- Species: E. tilonura

Binomial name
- Eudorcas tilonura (Heuglin, 1863)
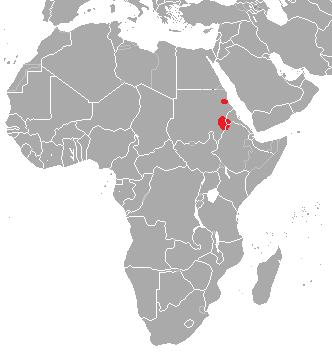
- Heuglin's gazelle range

= Heuglin's gazelle =

Species of mammal

Heuglin's gazelle (Eudorcas tilonura) is a species of gazelle found east of the Nile River in Eritrea, Ethiopia and Sudan. It was considered a subspecies of the red-fronted gazelle (E. rufrifrons) or conspecific with Thomson's gazelle (E. thomsonii) and Mongalla gazelle (E. albonotata) by some authors in the past. This small gazelle stands nearly 67 cm (26 in) at the shoulder and weighs between 15 and 35 kg (33 and 77 lb). The coat is dark reddish brown with a dark reddish stripe on the flanks, except for the underparts and the rump which are white. Horns, present in both sexes, measure 15 to 35 cm (5.9 to 13.8 in) in length.

Little is known about the ecology and behaviour of Heuglin's gazelles; they typically remain solitary or form groups of two to four. Herbivores, these gazelles possibly browse as well as graze. Gestation lasts nearly six months, after which probably a single calf is born. Heuglin's gazelles inhabit open areas such as steppes, dry grasslands and thorn bushlands up to an elevation of 1,400 m (4,600 ft). Habitat loss and illegal hunting for meat are major threats to the survival of these gazelles. Populations might have fallen by 20% in roughly nine years after 2008; as of 2016, only 2,500 to 3,500 individuals remain in small fragmented groups, with fewer than 2,500 adults. Heuglin's gazelle is classified as Endangered on the IUCN Red List.

== Taxonomy ==
German explorer and ornithologist Theodor von Heuglin first described Heuglin's gazelle in 1863. He based his description on a specimen from the plains close to Ain-Saba in Bogosland in Abyssinia (the Ethiopian Empire). This species has been considered a subspecies of the red-fronted gazelle (Eudorcas rufifrons) or conspecific with Thomson's gazelle (E. thomsonii) and Mongalla gazelle (E. albonotata) by some authors. In 2013, biologist Colin Groves considered Heuglin's gazelle an independent species, and this has subsequently been followed by many authors.

== Characteristics ==
This species is notably smaller than other gazelles, shows significantly lesser sexual dimorphism and has shorter and thinner horns (present in both sexes). The head-and-body length is between 55 and 120 cm (22 and 47 in), and the shoulder height is nearly 67 cm (26 in). Males weigh between 20 and 35 kg (44 and 77 lb), while the weight of females varies from 15 to 25 kg (33 to 55 lb). The coat is dark reddish brown, except for the underparts and the rump which are white. There is a dark reddish stripe on the flanks. The face is darker in the middle, and there are white circles around the eyes. The horns measure 22–35 cm (8.7–13.8 in) in males and 15–25 cm (5.9–9.8 in) in females, and turn inward at the tips. They are spaced 11.9–17.3 cm (4.7–6.8 in) apart at the base, and the tips are separated by 4.1–9.4 cm (1.6–3.7 in). Females have more slender and straighter horns than do males. The tail measures 15 to 27 cm (5.9 to 10.6 in) and is rufous at the base, turning black towards the end. It is smaller and more rufous than the red-fronted gazelle, the nose is unmarked. Dorcas gazelle, sympatric with Heuglin's gazelle in some areas, has a lighter reddish stripe. The larger and paler Soemmerring's gazelle shares its range with Heuglin's gazelle in southwestern Eritrea, and has short, heavy horns curved backward with tips pointing inward, a whiter rump and short white hairs on the tail.

== Ecology and behaviour ==
Heuglin's gazelles lead solitary lives or form groups of two to four. They scrape the ground to create resting sites under shrubs or large trees, such as the Egyptian balsam (Balanites aegyptiaca) in savannahs and Vachellia nubica in shrublands, during the hottest period of the day. Groups of gazelles may rest in shallower sites for long periods of time, as suggested by the increasing dung piles in these areas. Little is known of territorial behaviour in the wild; captive males form dung heaps close to the fences of their enclosures, smelling and scratching the ground nearby followed by excretion. Preorbital glands are also used for marking. Herbivores, they possibly browse as well as graze. Though Heuglin's gazelles can survive for long periods without water, they are more water-dependent than other gazelles in their range. Copulation lasts a few seconds; the male stands upright on the hindfeet and mounts the female. Gestation lasts 184 to 189 days, after which probably a single calf is born; most births take place in the wet season. Jackals may prey on young; hyaenas may also be potential predators. Little else is known about the ecology and behaviour of these gazelles.

== Distribution and habitat ==
The range is east of the Nile River and patchy, bounded by the southern Red Sea Hills in Sudan and mountainous terrain in northwestern Ethiopia and western Eritrea. Heuglin's gazelles inhabit open areas such as steppes, dry grasslands and thorn bushlands up to an elevation of 1,400 m (4,600 ft). Little is known about the populations and their status. Numbers have plummeted in Eritrea; in 2019 the Forestry and Wild Life Authority of Eritrea declared that Heuglin's gazelle had been sighted again in the country in the Dige sub-zone (Gash-Barka Region). The gazelle was reportedly seen last during the time of the Italian colonial rule in Eritrea (19th to 20th centuries).

== Threats and conservation ==
The IUCN Red List classifies Heuglin's gazelle as Endangered. According to the IUCN, the numbers might have fallen by as much as 20% in roughly nine years after 2008. As of 2016, only 2,500 to 3,500 individuals remain in small fragmented groups, with fewer than 2,500 adults. The gazelle is suffering from severe habitat loss due to overgrazing, deforestation, agricultural expansion and droughts. Illegal hunting for meat is another major threat. Heuglin's gazelle occurs in several protected areas: Gash-Setit in Eritrea, Kafta Sheraro National Park (and probably Alatash National Park) in Ethiopia, and Dinder National Park in Sudan. Antelope conservationist Rod East noted that populations in the Dinder National Park are threatened by hunting particularly in the wet season when the animals often cross the border of the park. Moreover, in the dry season camel and goat herders often trespass the area and let their animals graze on the vegetation, depriving Heuglin's gazelles of food and resting sites.
