= C11H14O5 =

The molecular formula C_{11}H_{14}O_{5} (Molar mass: 226.226 g/mol) may refer to:

- Genipin
- Sarracenin
- dihydrosinapic acid 3-(4-hydroxy-3,5-dimethoxyphenyl)propionic acid
