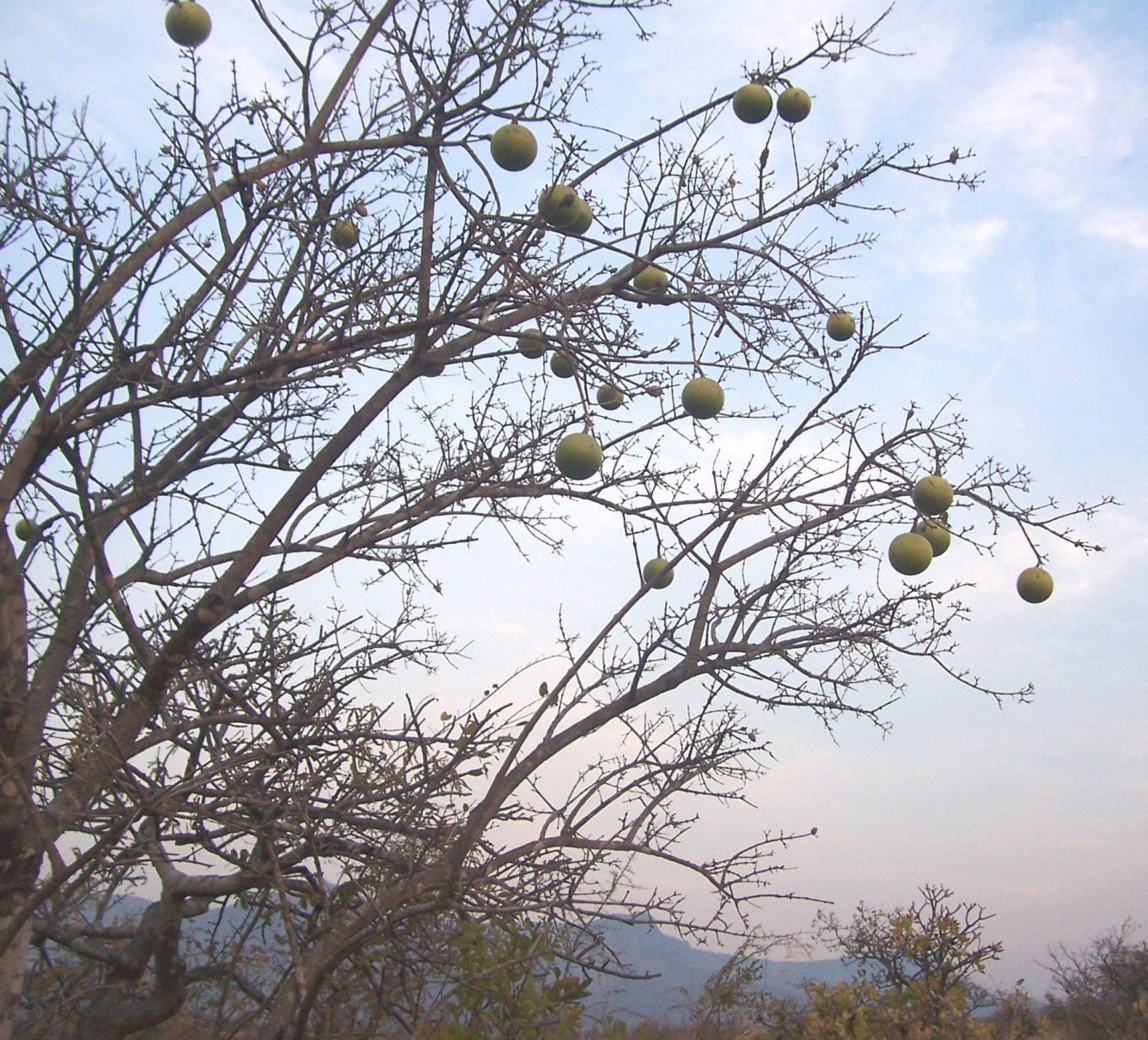

Scientific classification
- Kingdom: Plantae
- Clade: Tracheophytes
- Clade: Angiosperms
- Clade: Eudicots
- Clade: Asterids
- Order: Gentianales
- Family: Loganiaceae
- Genus: Strychnos
- Species: S. spinosa

Binomial name
- Strychnos spinosa Lam.

Synonyms
- List: Brehmia spinosa (Lam.) Harv.; Strychnos buettneri Gilg; Strychnos cardiophylla Gilg & Busse; Strychnos carvalhoi Gilg; Strychnos cuneifolia Gilg & Busse; Strychnos djalonis A.Chev.; Strychnos emarginata Baker; Strychnos euryphylla Gilg & Busse; Strychnos flacurtii Desv. ex Thouars; Strychnos gilletii De Wild.; Strychnos gracillima Gilg; Strychnos harmsii Gilg & Busse; Strychnos laxa Soler.; Strychnos leiosepala Gilg & Busse; Strychnos lokua A.Rich.; Strychnos megalocarpa Gilg & Busse; Strychnos miniungansamba Gilg; Strychnos mueghe Chiov.; Strychnos omphalocarpa Gilg & Busse; Strychnos radiosperma Gilg & Busse; Strychnos rhombifolia Gilg & Busse; Strychnos sansibariensis Gilg; Strychnos schweinfurthii Gilg; Strychnos tonga Gilg; Strychnos volkensii Gilg ex Engl.; Strychnos volkensii Gilg; Strychnos vuntac Bojer

= Strychnos spinosa =

Species of tree

Strychnos spinosa, the Natal orange, also called mokotra in Madagascar, is a tree indigenous to tropical and subtropical Africa. It produces sweet-sour yellow fruits, containing numerous hard brown seeds. Greenish-white flowers grow in dense heads at the ends of branches (Sep-Feb/Spring - summer). The fruits tend to appear only after good rains. It is related to the deadly Strychnos nux-vomica, which contains strychnine. The fruit are large, smooth, and firm, transitioning from green to yellow as they ripen. Inside the fruit are tightly packed seeds, which may be toxic, surrounded by a fleshy, brown, edible covering.

Animals such as baboon, monkeys, bushpig, nyala and eland eat the fruit. The leaves are a popular food source for browsers such as duiker, kudu, impala, steenbok, nyala and elephant.

== Distribution ==
This tree can be found growing singly in well-drained soils. It is found in bushveld, riverine fringes, sand forest and coastal bush from the Eastern Cape to Kwazulu-Natal, northwards to Mozambique, and inland to Eswatini, Zimbabwe, parts of Zambia specifically the western part of Zambia since it is sandy and some parts of southern province of Zambia, northern Botswana, northern Namibia, Angola, Guinea Bissau, to tropical Africa, north west Madagascar, south east Madagascar at Sainte Luce Reserve, Southern Kenya on the lower parts of Eastern arc mountains, north west Ethiopia, and western Tigray at Kafta Sheraro National Park. It is able to grow in semi-arid and arid lands.

== Traditional medicine ==
The plant, taken alone or in conjunction with extracts of other plants, is used by the Tiv people of Nigeria for snakebites, venereal disease, increasing the flow of breastmilk in lactating mothers, and enhancing physical strength.

== Chemistry ==
An iridoid, sarracenin, has been isolated from the root bark of Strychnos spinosa.

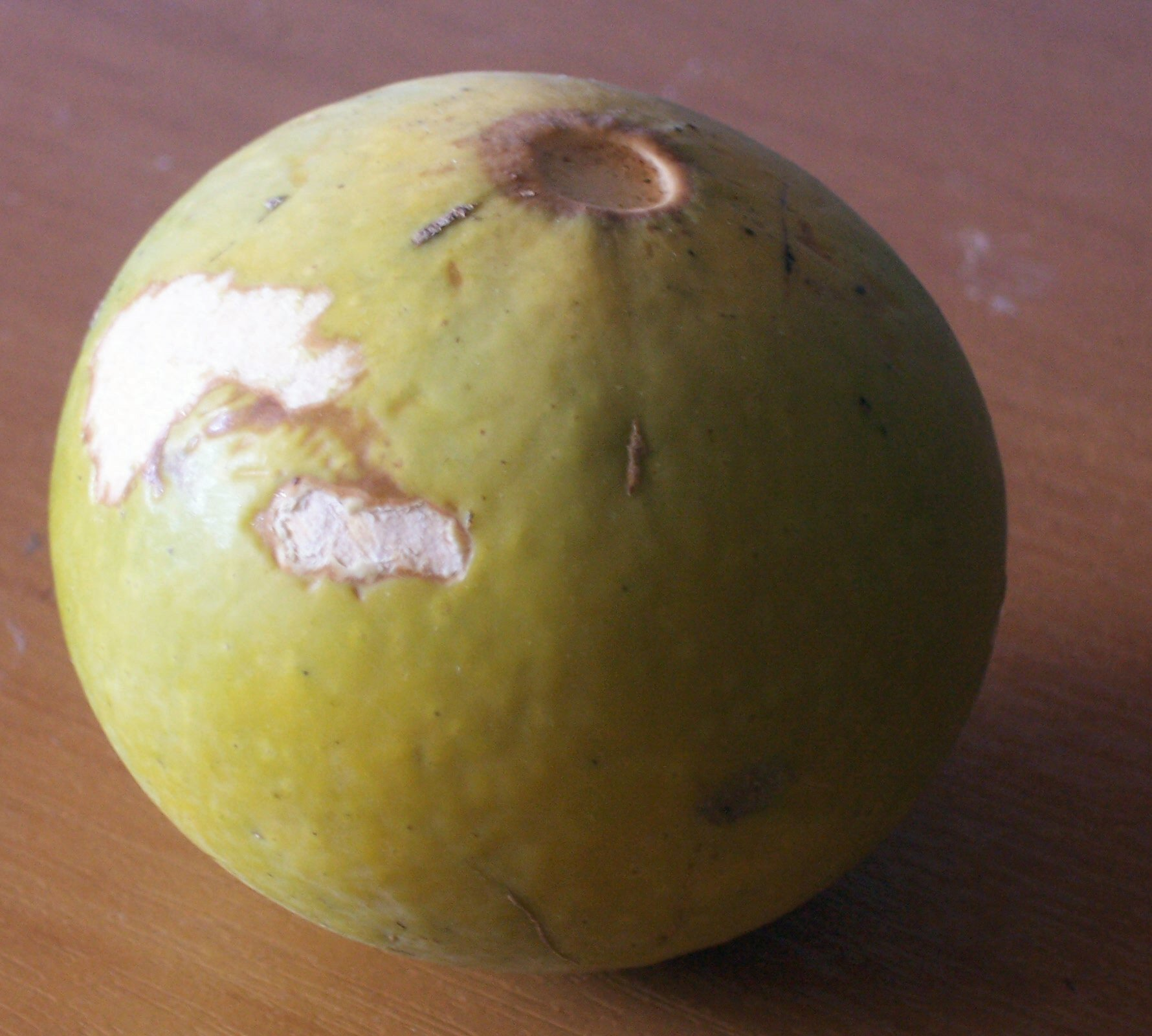
Ripe fruit

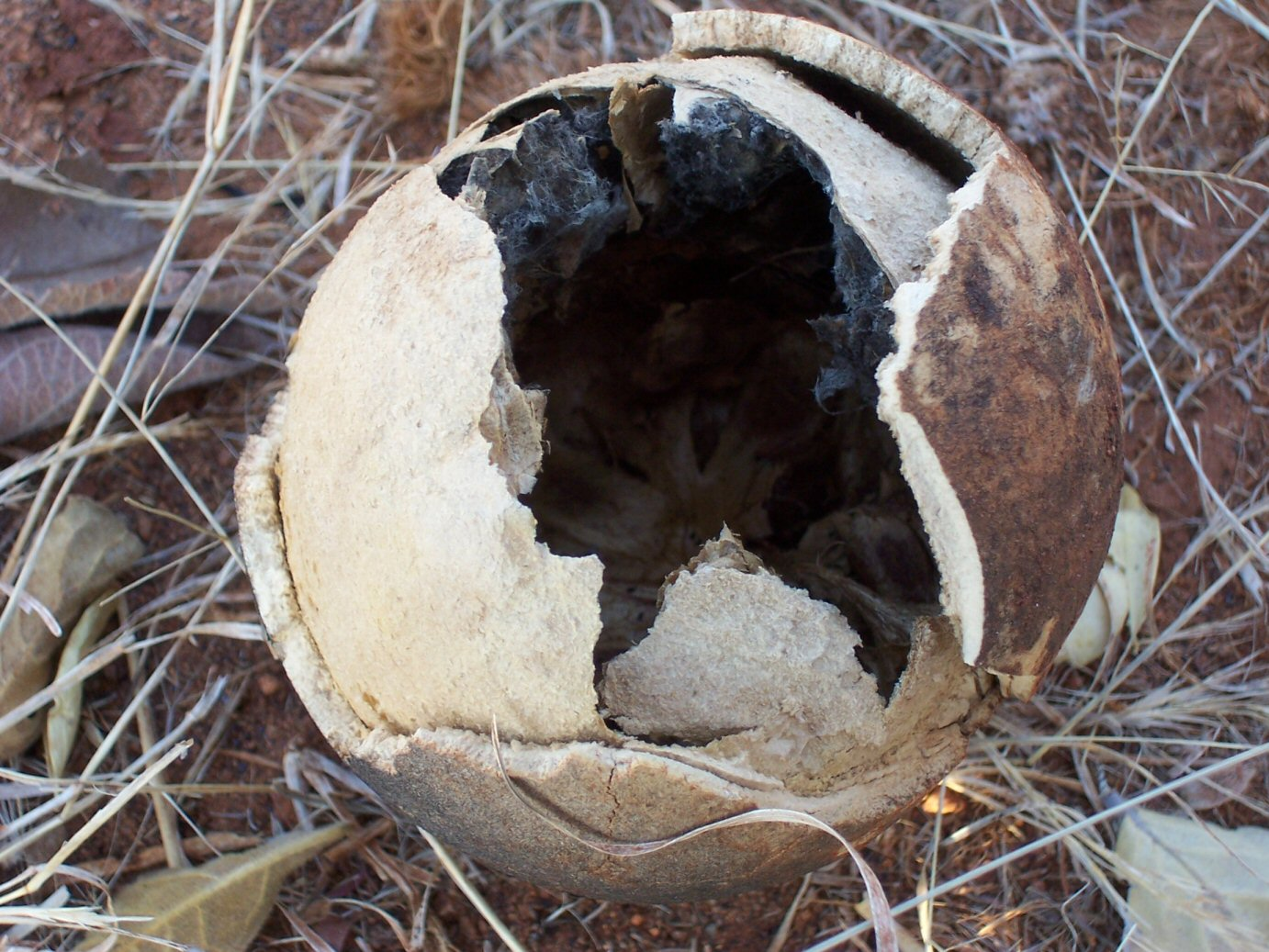
Dried out fruit

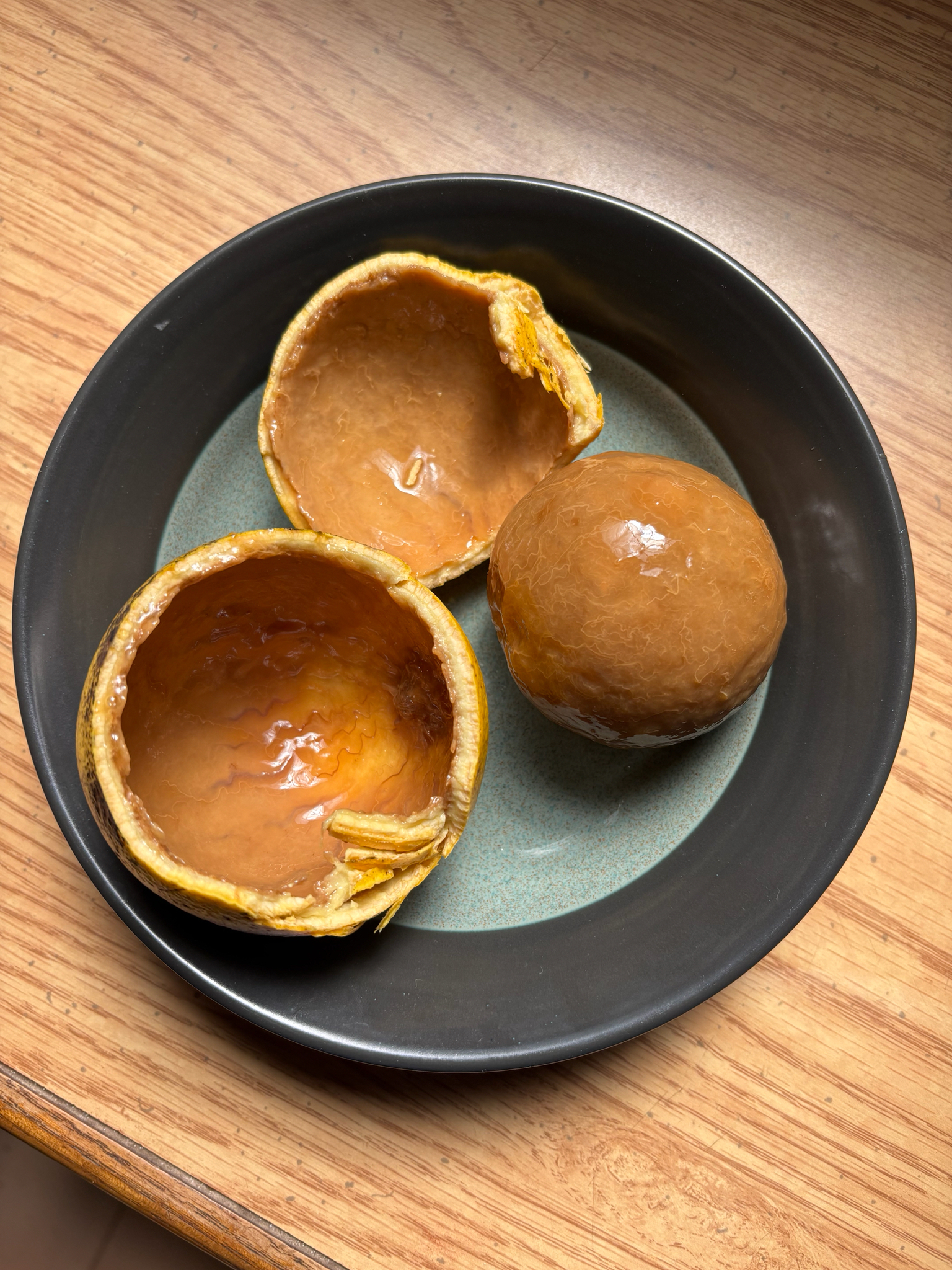
Opened fruit
