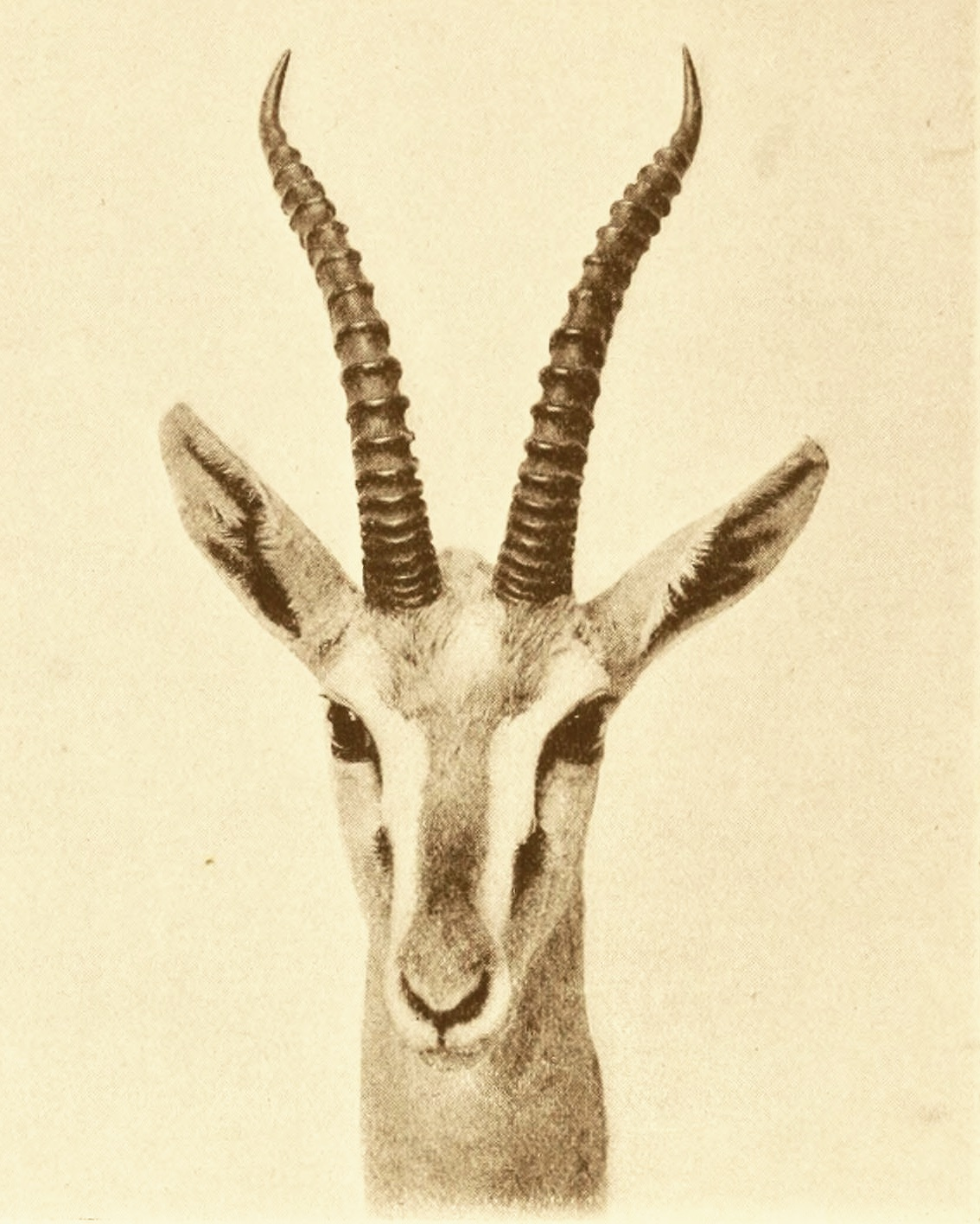

Conservation status
- Least Concern (IUCN 3.1)

Scientific classification
- Kingdom: Animalia
- Phylum: Chordata
- Class: Mammalia
- Order: Artiodactyla
- Family: Bovidae
- Subfamily: Antilopinae
- Genus: Eudorcas
- Species: E. albonotata

Binomial name
- Eudorcas albonotata (W. Rothschild, 1903)
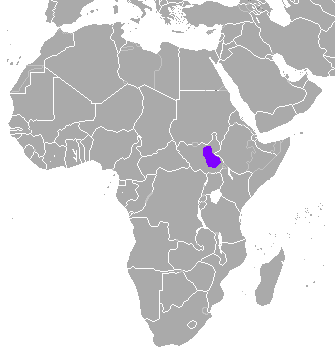
- Range of the Mongalla gazelle

= Mongalla gazelle =

Species of mammal

The Mongalla gazelle (Eudorcas albonotata) is a species of gazelle found in the floodplain and savanna of South Sudan. It was first described by British zoologist Walter Rothschild in 1903. The taxonomic status of the Mongalla gazelle is widely disputed. While some authorities consider it a full-fledged monotypic species in the genus Eudorcas, it is often considered a subspecies of Thomson's gazelle, while other authorities regard it as subspecies of the red-fronted gazelle.

The Mongalla gazelle is a medium-sized antelope. The coat is brown, while the forehead, underbelly and buttocks are completely white. There is a bright wide stripe on its lateral side, beneath which is another rufous one. Horns are present on both sexes, but the length of horns of males is double of that of females.

This gazelle inhabits flood plains and flat savanna grasslands in South Sudan, east of the Nile. Its range, however, does not reach the borders of Kenya and Uganda. The International Union for Conservation of Nature and Natural Resources (IUCN) has categorised the Mongalla gazelle as Least Concern. No major threats to the survival of this gazelle stand out at present.

== Taxonomy ==
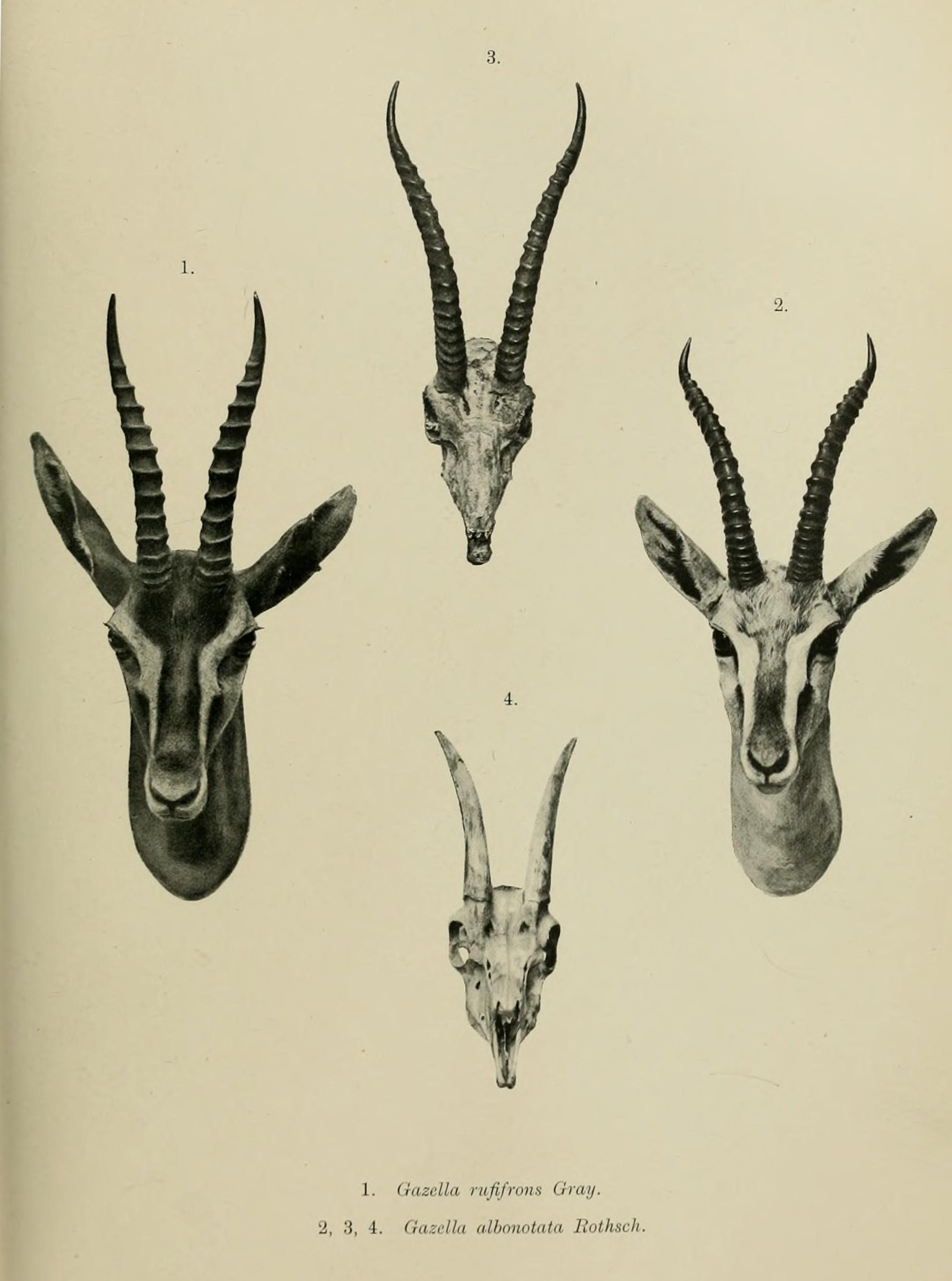
Mongalla gazelle head (far right) and skulls compared to a red-fronted gazelle

The scientific name of the Mongalla gazelle is Eudorcas albonotata. It was first described by British zoologist Walter Rothschild in 1903. There is little consensus on the taxonomic status of the Mongalla gazelle. This monotypic species is often considered a subspecies of Thomson's gazelle (Eudorcas thomsonii) by many authors, such as Alan W. Gentry of the Natural History Museum, London. Moreover, the Thomson's gazelle has been considered to be conspecific with the red-fronted gazelle (E. rufifrons) by authors like Colin Groves. As such, the Mongalla gazelle is often listed as a subspecies of the red-fronted gazelle. On the other hand, in their 2011 publication Ungulate Taxonomy, Grubb and Groves consider the gazelle as a full-fledged species in the genus Eudorcas.

Gentry in 1972 and Grubb in 2005 noted that the Mongalla gazelle is more similar to the red-fronted gazelle in skull and horn proportions than to the Thomson's gazelle. The vernacular name derives from Mongalla, a community in Central Equatoria state of South Sudan.

== Description ==
The Mongalla gazelle is a medium-sized sexually dimorphic antelope. The forehead is completely white. Each eye is surrounded by a white ring. The area between tear ducts and the mouth is buff to black. The ears are pointed at the tips. It has a brown coat with a white underside and buttocks. There is a broad band across the flanks and another faint rufous one below it. A posterior band and facial stripe is also present. The knee tufts are quite large. There is hair all along the short tail. Horns are present in both sexes. The horns of males are short and marked by prominent rings. The horns of females are only half as long as those of the males, and are thin and straight. The horns curve backward and then forward, with the tips turned slightly inward.

This gazelle resembles the red-fronted gazelle in size, but the skull is narrower in the former. Moreover, while the horns of females are 50% shorter than males in the Mongalla gazelle, there are 60-70% shorter in the red-fronted gazelle and the Eritrean gazelle (a subspecies of Dorcas gazelle). It differs from the red-fronted gazelle because the former the nose and the stripe on the face is rufous to black instead of sandy to rufous. There are several differences between the two in term of the colourings of various facial features. Another difference is due to the greater backward laying of the horns and greater divergence in the horns of the Mongalla gazelle.

Horns of the male Mongalla gazelle are shorter and curved more inwards than those of the male Thomson's gazelle. In 1969, Groves pointed out that the Mongalla gazelle is somewhat intermediate between the Thomson's gazelle and the Nubian red-fronted gazelle (E. r. laevipes). The size of the Mongalla gazelle is similar to the latter, but the skull is narrower and the rostrum longer in the Mongalla gazelle than in the Nubian red-fronted gazelle.

== Habitat and distribution ==
The Mongalla gazelle inhabits flood plains and flat savanna grasslands in southeastern Sudan, east of the Nile. Its range, however, does not reach the borders of Kenya and Uganda. Though there have been reports of their presence in the Omo region of southwestern Ethiopia in the 1980s, no recent reports have validated this. In 1999, Rod East of the IUCN SSC Antelope Specialist Group gave a population estimate of 100,000, but it was known that numbers change substantially in the area of its range and some parts are not even accessible. A 2007 aerial survey in part of South Sudan gave a population estimate of 278,000.

The animal follows a nomadic annual migration cycle over the eastern Sudd floodplains. In the wet season, Mongalla gazelles congregate in high densities, along with other migratory species such as the white-eared kob and tiang. In fact, 1.2 million white-eared kob, tiang and Mongalla gazelles have continued their migration in South Sudan despite nearly 30 years of civil war in that area. In 2007, the Mongalla gazelle was the second-most numerous animal in the Boma ecosystem.

== Threats and conservation ==
The International Union for Conservation of Nature and Natural Resources (IUCN) has categorised the Mongalla gazelle as Least Concern. No major threats to the survival of this gazelle stand out at present. The population in the Boma ecosystem has been found to be stable and not under a great risk from hunting. Moreover, poachers have limited access to some parts of the range as they are devoid of water.
