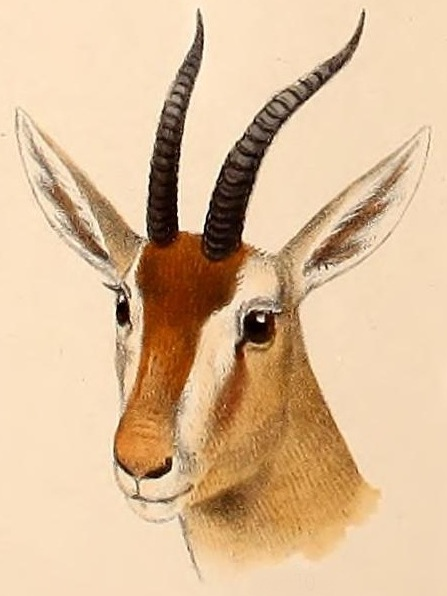

Conservation status
- Data Deficient (IUCN 3.1)

Scientific classification
- Kingdom: Animalia
- Phylum: Chordata
- Class: Mammalia
- Infraclass: Placentalia
- Order: Artiodactyla
- Family: Bovidae
- Subfamily: Antilopinae
- Genus: Eudorcas
- Species: E. rufina

Binomial name
- Eudorcas rufina (Thomas, 1894)

Synonyms
- Gazella rufina

= Red gazelle =

Extinct species of antelope

The red gazelle (Eudorcas rufina) is a possibly extinct species or subspecies of gazelle. It was formerly considered a member of the genus Gazella within the subgenus Eudorcas before Eudorcas was promoted to a full genus. It is thought to have lived in the better-watered mountain areas of North Africa rather than in deserts, because of the rich colouring on the coat.

There are no records of the red gazelle in the wild. It is known from three specimens purchased in markets in Algiers and Oran, northern Algeria, in the late 19th century. It is unknown where these specimens originated from. They are held in museums in Paris and London. Some authorities, such as Jonathan Kingdon, consider it a subspecies of the red-fronted gazelle (E. rufifrons or G. rufifrons). In 2008, K. de Smet reported one of the three specimens had proved on examination to be E. rufifrons, leading the IUCN Red List to revise its assessment of the species from Extinct to Data Deficient on the basis of doubts as to the validity of the taxon.

== Physical characteristics ==
The red gazelle is described as larger than the red-fronted gazelle, with heavier hooves, and distinctive bright red-brown fur. It is characterized to have thin (2.5–4 cm wide) black stripes across its flanks, in between its rear and front legs. The top of the head, cheeks, and sides of the neck are a pale whitish color, while the undersides and rump are a plain white colour. The center of its face is bordered on both side by pale streaks running from the eyes to the snout. It has a rufous tail with a black tip.
