= Kafta Sheraro National Park =

National park in northwestern Ethiopia

Kafta Humera National Park
- Kafta Humera National Park
- IUCN category II (national park)
- Location within Ethiopia
- Location: Tigray
- Nearest city: Humera
- Coordinates: 13°59′58.92″N 37°00′1.08″E
- Area: 6,000 km^{2} (2,300 sq mi)
- Designation: National park
- Established: 2007
- Governing body: Ethiopia Wildlife Conservation Authority
- Website: www.ewca.gov.et/en/node/20

Kafta Humera National Park (Tigrinya: ብሄራዊ ፓርክ ቃፍታ ሑሞራ; Amharic: የቃፍታ ሁመራ ብሔራዊ ፓርክ) is a national park in the Tigray. Kafta Humera National Park is one of the few highly bio-diversified parks in East Africa. It was only in 2007 that it got formal recognition as a national park. It was governed by the Ethiopia Wildlife Conservation Authority.

== Geography ==
Kafta Humera National Park is specifically located in the Tigray region, between Qafta, Humera, and Tahtay Adiabo. It borders Eritrea’s Gash-Setit to the north and is traversed by the river Tekeze. While the main river is the Tekeze, it is fed by a number of rivers that originate in the highlands of Wolqait, Qafta, Asgede, Tsimbla, Tselemti, Tsegede, and the widely stretched lowlands of Adiabo. Elevation ranges from 550 meters above sea level. Situated initially on 500,000 hectares, it has been downsized to 2,800 hectares. It is one of the largest conservation areas in Ethiopia.

== Flora and Fauna ==
Vegetation communities in the park include Acacia-Commiphora, Combretum-Terminalia, dry evergreen montane woodlands, and riparian types. A total of 167 mammal species, 95 bird species, and 9 reptile species have been recorded at the site.

The park is home to a transboundary African elephant population of about 500 individuals, which it shares with Eritrea's Gash-Setit, and which constitutes the northernmost elephant population in Eastern Africa. The Elephant population in Qafta migrates seasonally between Ethiopia and Eritrea. Kafta-Sheraro is also an important wintering site for demoiselle cranes. Kafta-Sheraro is also an important wintering site for demoiselle cranes. During a certain expedition to Kafta-Sheraro National Park from 26 March to 16 April 2009, more than 21,500 Demoiselle Cranes Anthropoides Virgo were recorded, or 9% of the world population of the species. This constitutes the first evidence of a large concentration of Demoiselle Cranes in East Africa. It appears to confirm that the Kafta-Sheraro area serves as a wintering site for the species and identifies this part of the Tekeze Valley as a wetland of international significance.

Other notable wildlife species include lion, leopard, caracal, aardvark, greater kudu, roan antelope, red-fronted gazelle, hyena, crocodile, cheetah, and red-necked ostrich.
