= Charles Léopold Laurillard =

French naturalist (1783–1853)

- Born: 21 January 1783; Montbéliard
- Died: 1853 (aged 69–70); Paris
- Scientific career
- Fields: Zoology, Paleontology

Charles Léopold Laurillard (21 January 1783 – 1853) was a French zoologist and paleontologist. His father died when he was 13, but he was able continue his studies. In 1803 he moved to Paris, and the following year he met Frédéric Cuvier, brother of Georges Cuvier, who was also a naturalist; they took Laurillard to the Musée National d'Histoire Naturelle, where he became the personal secretary of Georges Cuvier; he remained at the Museum even after Cuvier's death in 1832. He wrote several works of comparative anatomy and described a number of genera and species.
