= Sarracenin =

Names
- Preferred IUPAC name Methyl (1S,3S,7R,8R,9R)-9-methyl-2,4,10-trioxatricyclo[5.3.1.03,8]undec-5-ene-6-carboxylate

Identifiers
CAS Number	59653-37-1
3D model (JSmol)	Interactive image
ChEMBL	ChEMBL1982244
ChemSpider	10226990
PubChem CID	427877
UNII	SP5W2CT6D8
CompTox Dashboard (EPA)	DTXSID60330214
- InChI: InChI=1S/C11H14O5/c1-5-9-6-3-8(15-5)16-11(9)14-4-7(6)10(12)13-2/h4-6,8-9,11H,3H2,1-2H3 Key: QGBCGMGBGAHJIT-UHFFFAOYSA-N
- SMILES: CC1C2C3CC(O1)OC2OC=C3C(=O)OC

Properties
Chemical formula	C_{11}H_{14}O_{5}
Molar mass	226.228 g·mol^{−1}
- Except where otherwise noted, data are given for materials in their standard state (at 25 °C [77 °F], 100 kPa). Infobox references

Sarracenin is an iridoid found in several plant species in the carnivorous family Sarraceniaceae. It also occurs in other non-carnivorous plants such as Strychnos spinosa (Loganiaceae) and Patrinia heterophylla (Caprifoliaceae).

== History ==
Sarracenin was first isolated from the roots of Sarracenia flava in 1976. Analysis of S. flava extracts was prompted by their use as a folk remedy by people of the Okefenokee swamp region

== Biosynthesis ==
Sarracenin is believed to be derived from loganin, with either morronoside or secologanin serving as intermediates in the biosynthetic process.

== Uses ==
Sarracenin displays antimicrobial activity against several pathogens including Staphylococcus aureus, Streptococcus pyogenes, Shigella dysenteriae, Klebsiella pneumoniae, Candida albicans, Candida tropicalis, Candida thrusei, and Candida stellatoidea. It has also demonstrated cytotoxicity against three tumor cell lines: A375 (human melanoma cell), SGC-7901 (human gastric cancer cell), and HeLa.

== Ecology ==
Sarracenin is the primary volatile present in the insect-attracting spoons of Heliamphora species. When Heliamphora plants were grown in a laboratory setting, sarracenin was rarely present in these spoons. Plants that did produce sarracenin generally attracted more insects than those without, suggesting a role in prey attraction or capture. Sarracenin is also present in the pitchers and lids of Darlingtonia californica and many Sarracenia species, likely serving the same purpose as in Heliamphora.
