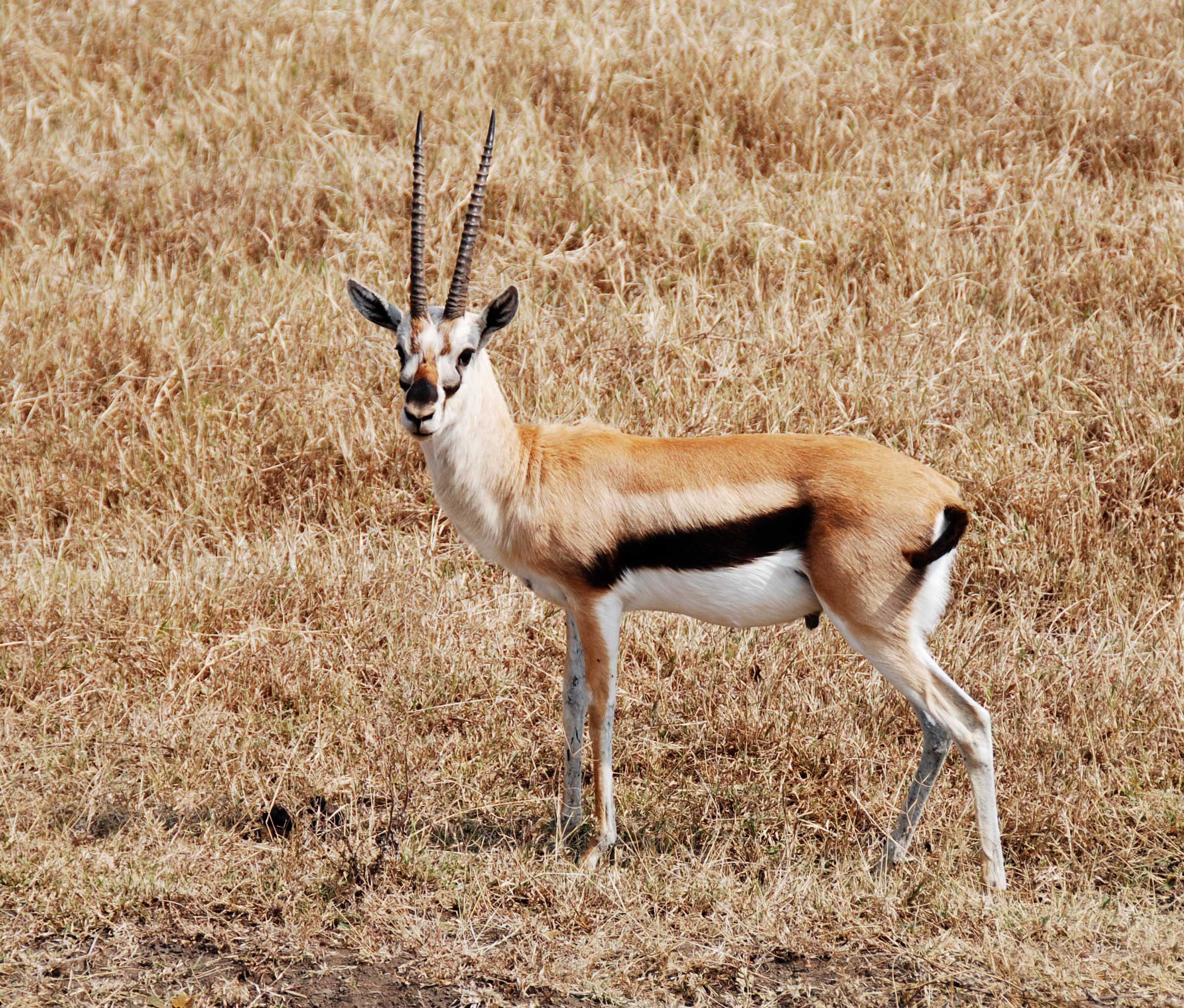
- Thomson's gazelle - Serengeti region of Kenya and Tanzania

Scientific classification
- Kingdom: Animalia
- Phylum: Chordata
- Class: Mammalia
- Infraclass: Placentalia
- Order: Artiodactyla
- Family: Bovidae
- Subfamily: Antilopinae
- Tribe: Antilopini
- Genus: Eudorcas; Fitzinger, 1869

Type species
- Gazella laevipes Sundevall, 1847

= Eudorcas =

Genus of mammals

Eudorcas is a genus of antelope; the species are commonly called gazelles. Eudorcas was originally considered a subgenus of the genus Gazella but has since been elevated to generic status. The five species within the genus Eudorcas are:

== Species ==
Image	Scientific name	Subspecies	Common name	Distribution
	E. albonotata		Mongalla gazelle	South Sudan
	E. rufifrons	south of the Sahara: E. r. kanuri; E. r. laevipes; E. r. rufifrons	Red-fronted gazelle	south of the Sahara
	E. tilonura		Heuglin's gazelle	Sudan, Eritrea and Ethiopia
	E. rufina		Red gazelle†	Algeria
	E. thomsonii	E. t. nasalis; E. t. thomsonii	Thomson's gazelle	East Africa

== Social structure and behavior ==
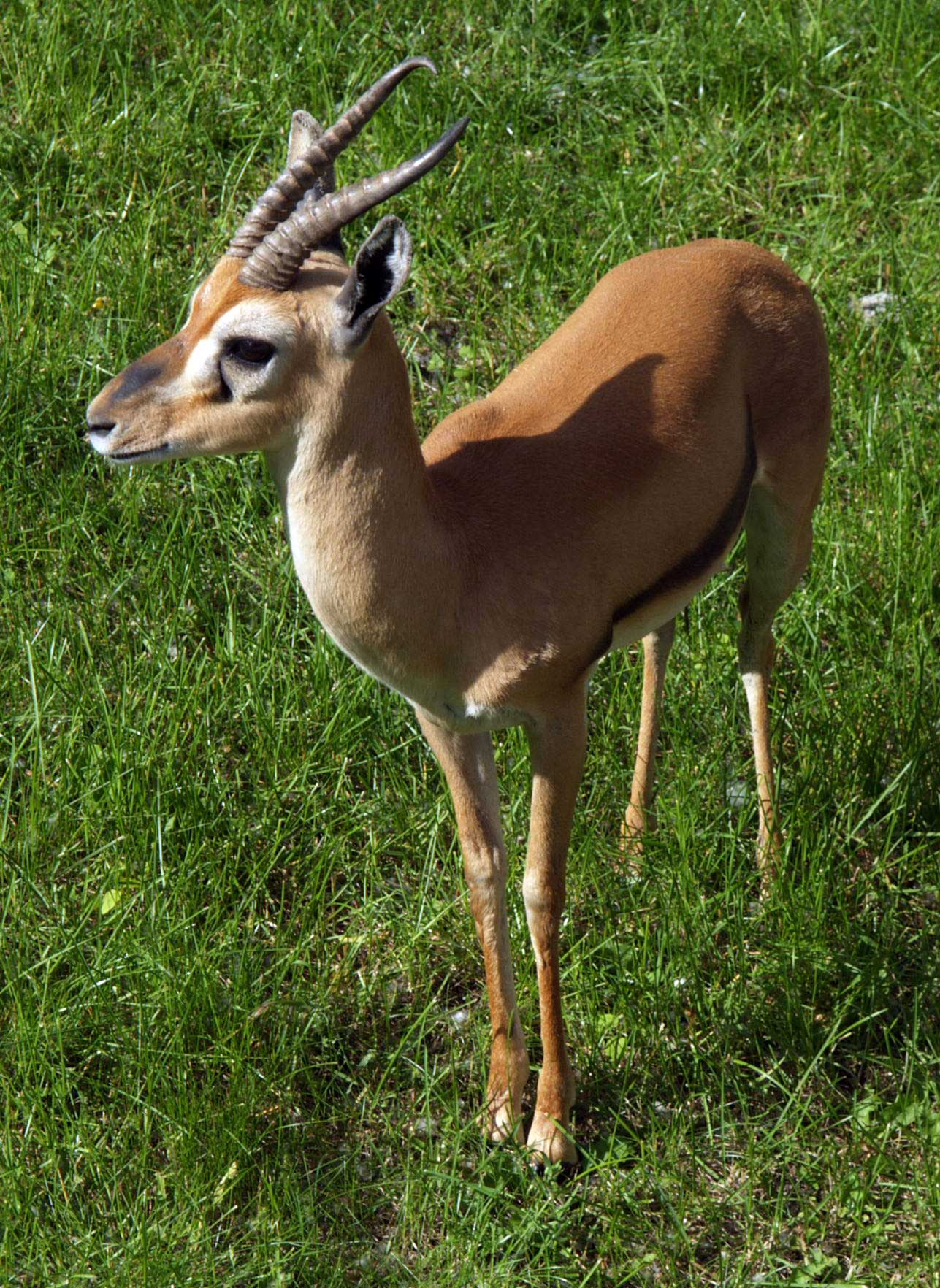
Red fronted gazelle - Middle Africa

The social structure of gazelles consists of several types of groups. Male gazelles are territorial throughout their adult lives, though not usually before two to three years of age. During the nonterritorial periods, males usually spend their time in bachelor groups or as part of a mixed herd. Likewise, females will form migratory female groups that travel through the males' territories. As the female groups pass through, the territorial males will try to herd them to prevent them from leaving. Adult males with adjoining territories will engage in combat several times a day, fighting with their horns to establish dominance and the boundaries of their territories. In this way, the accepted boundaries of the territory can change on a daily basis. If a lone male, a bachelor group, or in some cases even an adolescent male fawn of a female gazelle should be passing through a territorial male's region, the male will chase the offender out of his territory. This territoriality does not extend to males of other species.
