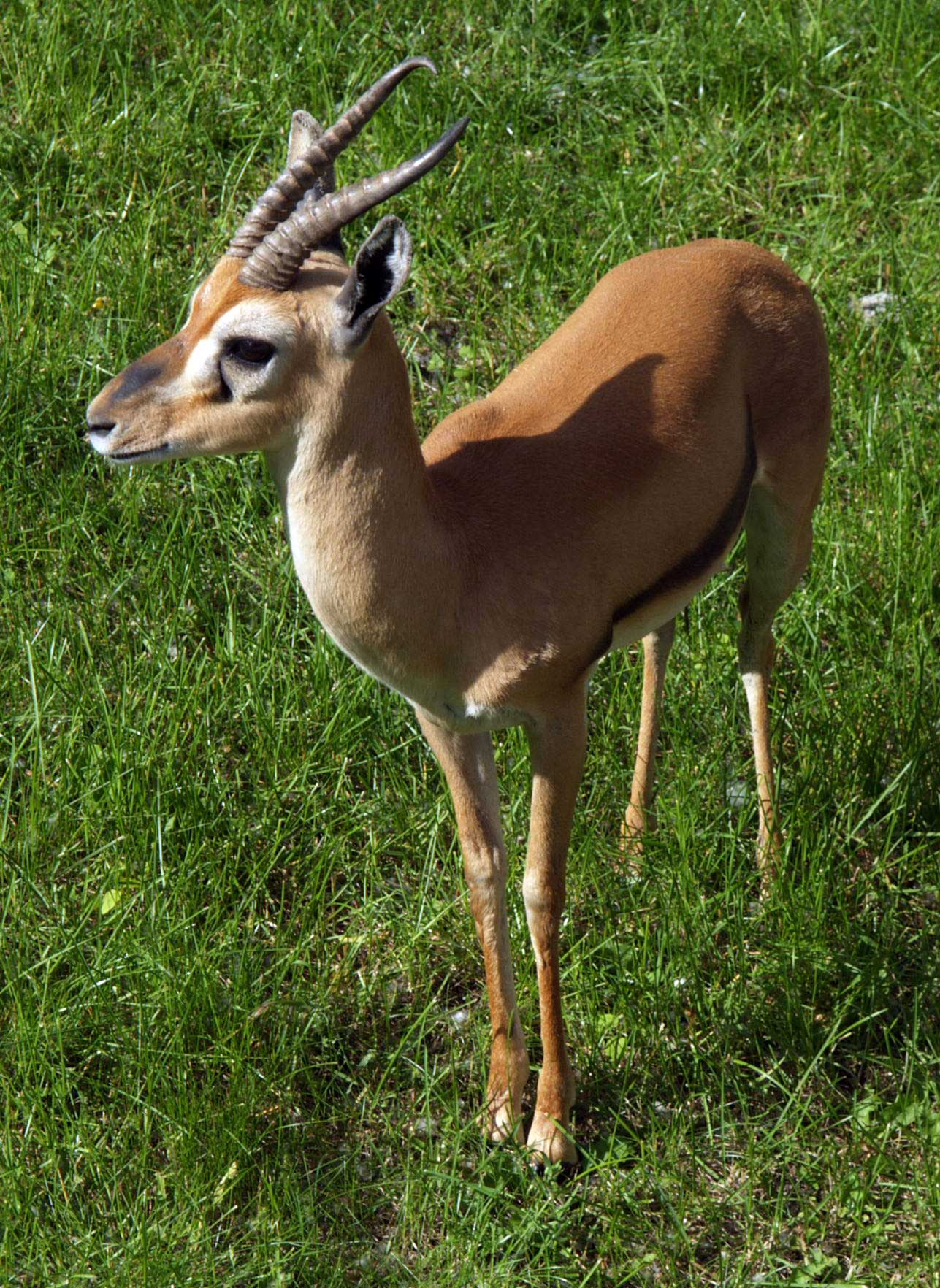

Conservation status
- Vulnerable (IUCN 3.1)

Scientific classification
- Kingdom: Animalia
- Phylum: Chordata
- Class: Mammalia
- Order: Artiodactyla
- Family: Bovidae
- Subfamily: Antilopinae
- Genus: Eudorcas
- Species: E. rufifrons

Binomial name
- Eudorcas rufifrons (Gray, 1846)

Subspecies
- 5 subspecies, see text
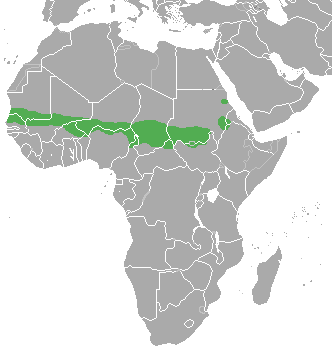
- Red-fronted gazelle range

Synonyms
- Gazella rufifrons

= Red-fronted gazelle =

Species of mammal

The red-fronted gazelle (Eudorcas rufifrons) is a widely but unevenly distributed gazelle found across the middle of Africa from Senegal to northeastern Ethiopia. It is mainly resident in the Sahel zone, a narrow cross-Africa band south of the Sahara, where it prefers arid grasslands, wooded savannas and shrubby steppes. It may be closely related to the Thomson's gazelle, and is considered a vulnerable species.

== Taxonomy ==
The scientific name of the red-fronted gazelle is Eudorcas rufifrons. It was first described by British zoologist John Edward Gray.

- Eudorcas rufifrons centralis W. Schwarz, 1914 – eastern Chad red-fronted gazelle
- E. r. hasleri Pocock, 1912 – north Nigeria red-fronted gazelle.
- E. r. kanuri Schwarz, 1914 – Kanuri red-fronted gazelle
- E. r. laevipes Sundevall, 1847 – Nubian red-fronted gazelle
- E. r. rufifrons Gray, 1846 – Senegal red-fronted gazelle

One authority considers Thomson's gazelle (E. thomsoni), of East Africa, a subspecies of red-fronted gazelle. The red-fronted gazelle was formerly considered a member of the genus Gazella within the subgenus Eudorcas before Eudorcas was elevated to generic status.

== Description ==
The male and female red-fronted gazelles are similar in size, and both have s-curved horns. It has a light red-brown color around its whole body, except for its white underside and rump. It has a distinct, thin (2–4 cm (0.79–1.57 in)-high) black band that runs from the elbow to the stifle (hind leg). Its face is bordered by a pair of white stripes that runs from the eye to the corner of the mouth, which are more distinct than the pale white stripes that run down the face of the red gazelle, an animal commonly confused for it. It has a black-tufted tail.

The average body weight of the red-fronted gazelles ranges from 7.8 kg (17 lb) for the young fawns to 29.7 kg (65 lb) for the adults, while the shoulder height ranges from 38.7 cm (15.2 in) for the young to 68.7 cm (27.0 in) for the adults.

The characteristics of the red-fronted gazelle were determined by Waza National Park between September 1989 and December 1993. The body length, horn length, head length, body weight, body colour, and tail length were measured from the carcasses of 141 red-fronted gazelles.

== Distribution and habitat ==
The red-fronted gazelle is native to Burkina Faso, Cameroon, Central African Republic, Chad, Eritrea, Ethiopia, Mali, Mauritania, Niger, Nigeria, Senegal, South Sudan and Sudan. It occupies habitats such as semi-arid grasslands, savannas, savanna woodlands, and areas of scrub. It is able to adapt to extensive pastureland and abandoned agricultural land if there is some cover. It moves seasonally between different habitats.

== Ecology and behavior ==
They reside in the Sahel zone, but are not well-adapted to arid conditions. They will feed along the southern edge of the Sahara during the rains, but must migrate southward during the dry season to find sufficient water.

Even where it is relatively common, population densities are generally as low as 0.3~0.7 animals per square km.

The red-fronted gazelle lives alone, in pairs or in small groups of no more than six individuals. Herds occasionally have been found of up to 15 individuals. It is mainly a grazer, but also browses leaves from trees and scrub. Their main predators include lions, leopards, cheetahs, hyenas, and African wild dogs.

=== Reproduction and development ===
The red-fronted gazelle gives birth to one fawn after a gestation period of 184–189 days. The fawn is likely to wean at around three months. Based on the closely related Thomson's gazelle, females may breed as early as nine months, while males may not mature until 18 months. The lifespan is up to 14.5 years in captivity. Breeding in the wild occurs throughout most of the year. Typical of "hider" species, infants are cached by their mothers and visited for nursing.

== Status ==
The total population of red-fronted gazelle is estimated at 25,000 individuals, and their population is decreasing. The threats faced by the red-fronted gazelle include illegal hunting, habitat degradation and competition with domestic livestock. Overgrazing of its habitat by livestock drives it elsewhere, as does clearance of land for farming. Substantial populations have now dwindled to scattered remnant populations across most of its range. The International Union for Conservation of Nature has rated its conservation status as "vulnerable".

Approximately 15% of the population of this species occurs in a number of protected areas throughout its range: W National Park (Niger, Burkina Faso, Benin), Waza National Park (Cameroon), Zakouma National Park (Chad), Dinder National Park (Sudan), and Manovo-Gounda St. Floris National Park (Central African Republic). They have also been reintroduced in the Guembeul Natural Reserve and Djoudj National Bird Sanctuary of Senegal.
