= Marsh antelope =

Marsh antelope may refer to several species of Antelope:

- Waterbuck
- Kob
- Puku
- Lechwe
- Southern Reedbuck
- Mountain Reedbuck
- Bohor Reedbuck
