= Cape lechwe =

Scientific classification
- Kingdom: Animalia
- Phylum: Chordata
- Class: Mammalia
- Order: Artiodactyla
- Family: Bovidae
- Genus: Kobus
- Species: †K. venterae

Binomial name
- †Kobus venterae Broom, 1913

Extinct species of mammal

The Cape lechwe or Venter's lechwe (Kobus venterae) is an extinct species similar to the red lechwe, Kobus leche. It was described by Robert Broom from a frontlet and horn core from Haagenstad (now known as Florisbad), which Broom believed to be an intermediate form between lechwe and waterbuck. However others have failed to find justification for separating the species from Kobus leche.

It formerly occurred in the North West, Gauteng, Free State, Northern Cape, and Eastern Cape Provinces of South Africa. Like the other subspecies within the Kobus leche group, the Cape lechwe inhabited extensive marshlands, fens and alluvial flooded grasslands that flourished across the vast plains of the aforementioned Provinces of the Republic of South Africa in the not so distant past. The estimated southern limit of Cape lechwe range within the Eastern Cape Province seems to have been the central plateau that is the South African Highveld, in the environs of Cradock and Tarkastad.

The Cape lechwe stood between 90 and 100 centimetres at the shoulder and topped the scale at between 70 and 120 kilograms. In all probability they were marked similarly to the red lechwe Kobus l. leche subspecies, being golden brown with a white belly. Therefore, males were darker in colour, but the general hue of their hide varied depending on the southern ecotypical cline. The long spiral structured horns were vaguely lyre-shaped, and were found only in males. Their hind legs were somewhat longer in proportion than in other antelopes, as with all subspecies within the Kobus leche group, to ease long-distance running in moist, inundated, and marshy soils.

== Habitat ==
The Cape lechwe, as with the other extant subspecies, were highly specialized in their habitat requirements, with water being at the center of their existence. This being the case, lechwe in general rarely venture further than say 2 to 3 kilometres from a permanent water source. Their characteristic haunt, as with the extant subspecies, were shallow inundated floodplains on the periphery of rivers, lakes and swamps, and especially on the ecotone that these habitats form with papyrus Cyperus papyrus, both Phragmites australis and Phragmites mauritianus reeds, and tall aquatic grasses. These habitats in addition to knee-deep water were used as protection against predators. Their legs are covered in a water repelling substance allowing them to run quite fast in knee-deep water.

Lechwe are diurnal. They gather in herds which can include many thousands of individuals. Herds are usually all of one sex but during mating season they mix.
