= Roberts' lechwe =

Conservation status
- Extinct (IUCN 3.1)

Scientific classification
- Kingdom: Animalia
- Phylum: Chordata
- Class: Mammalia
- Order: Artiodactyla
- Family: Bovidae
- Genus: Kobus
- Species: K. leche
- Subspecies: K. l. robertsi

Trinomial name
- Kobus leche robertsi † (Rothschild, 1907)

Extinct subspecies of lechwe

Roberts' lechwe (Kobus leche robertsi) or Kawambwa lechwe is an extinct subspecies of lechwe. It was found around Kawambwa, Zambia.
