= Upemba lechwe =

Conservation status
- Critically Endangered (IUCN 3.1)

Scientific classification
- Kingdom: Animalia
- Phylum: Chordata
- Class: Mammalia
- Order: Artiodactyla
- Family: Bovidae
- Genus: Kobus
- Species: K. leche
- Subspecies: K. l. anselli

Trinomial name
- Kobus leche anselli Cotterill, 2005

Subspecies of mammal

The Upemba lechwe (Kobus leche anselli) is a subspecies of red lechwe antelope found only in the Upemba wetlands in the Democratic Republic of Congo. It was described in 2005, after analysis of 35 museum specimens collected in 1926 and 1947–8. Some authorities treat the Upemba lechwe as a species, K. anselli. It has been referred to as Africa's "forgotten antelope" and faces imminent extinction due to poaching.

The population of Upemba lechwe has declined greatly since the 1970s. Commercial poaching during the 1980s reduced the population from an estimated 20,000 individuals to under 1,000 today. A 2025 report suggests that the 1,000 figure is "significantly inflated" and that less than 100 Upemba lechwe remain. The recognition of K. anselli as a distinct evolutionary entity was previously ignored, because originally thought to be simply a red lechwe. The future of the Upemba lechwe hinges on reducing adverse human impact and maintaining the integrity of its wetland habitat. However, the remaining Upemba lechwe appear to live in heavily anthropized environments.

Lechwe stand 90 to 100 cm (35 to 39 in) at the shoulder and weigh from 70 to 120 kg (150 to 260 lb). They are golden brown with white bellies. Males are darker in color. The long, spiral horns are vaguely lyre-shaped and borne only by males. The hind legs are somewhat longer in proportion than in other antelopes, to ease long-distance running on marshy soil.

In 2025, during the first population update in 50 years, scientists observed 10 Upemba lechwe via aerial counting, while searching for the animals east of the Lualaba River.
