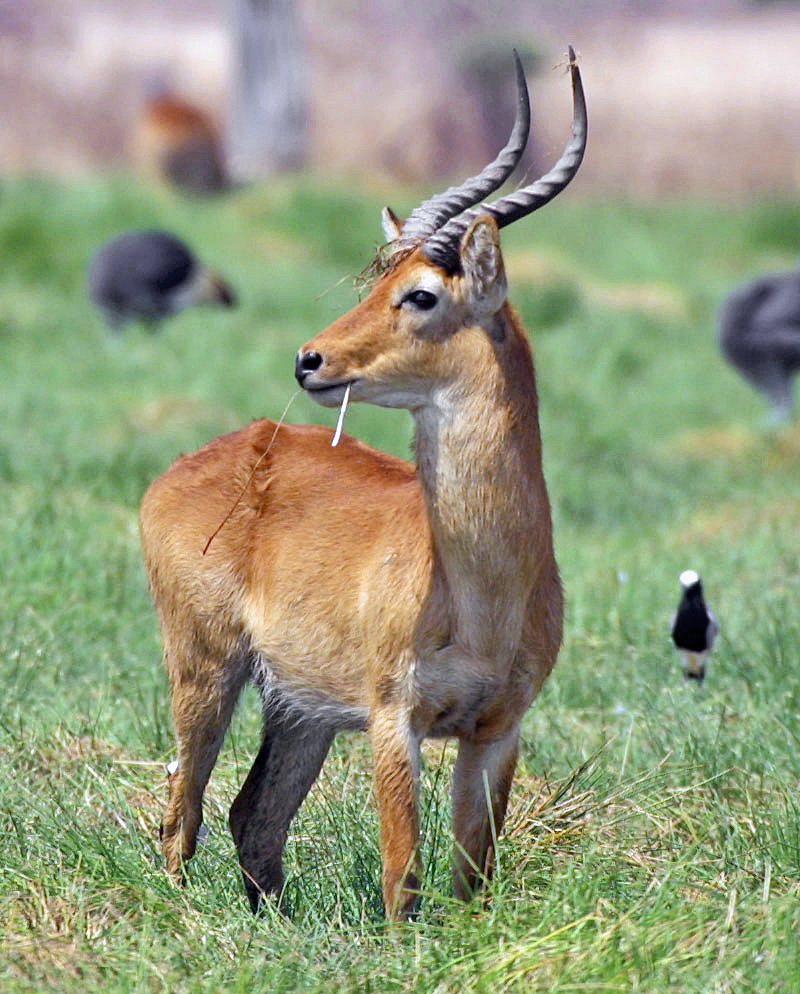
- Male (Zambia)

Conservation status
- Near Threatened (IUCN 3.1)

Scientific classification
- Kingdom: Animalia
- Phylum: Chordata
- Class: Mammalia
- Order: Artiodactyla
- Family: Bovidae
- Genus: Kobus
- Species: K. vardonii

Binomial name
- Kobus vardonii (Livingstone, 1857)
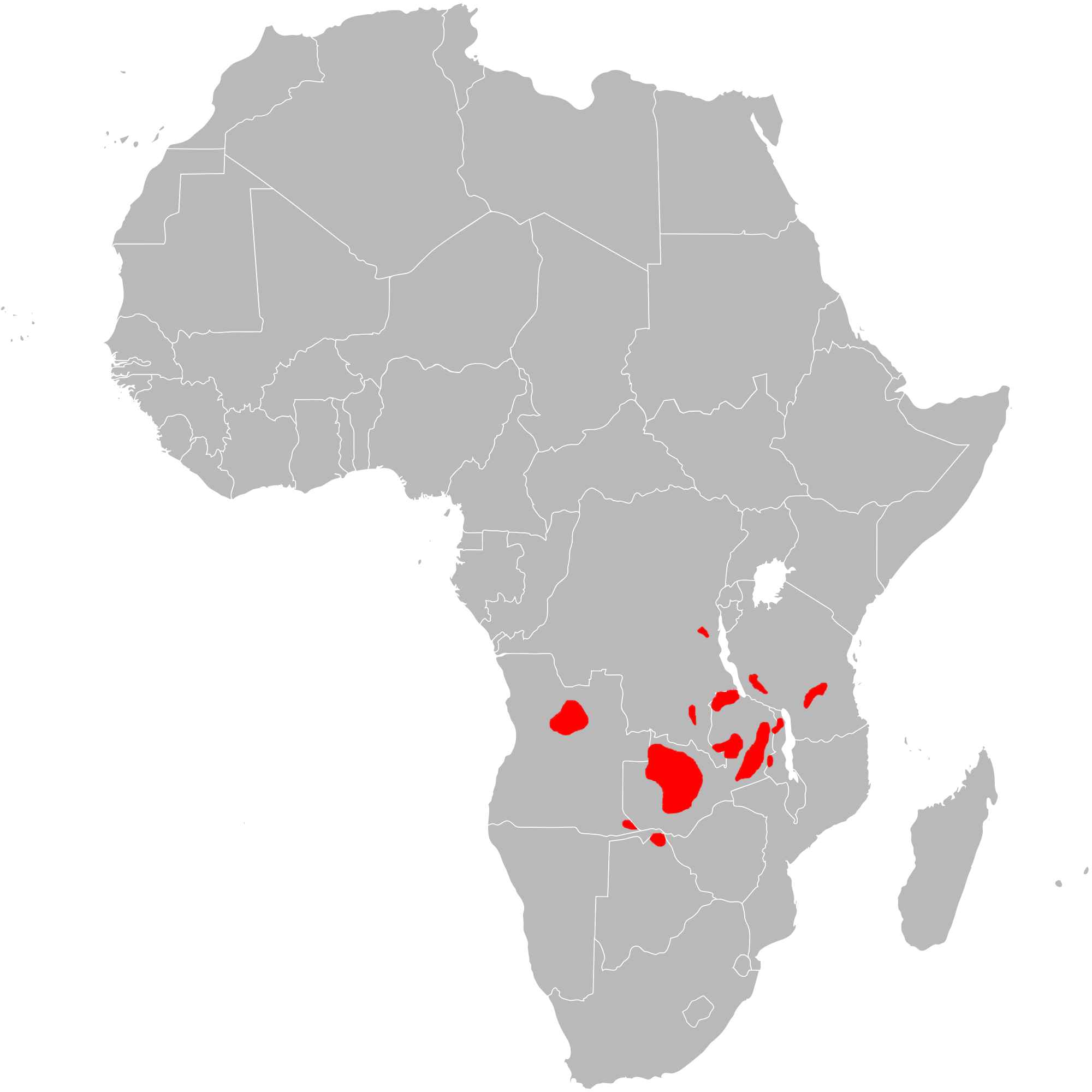

= Puku =

Species of antelope

The puku (Kobus vardonii) is a medium-sized antelope found in wet grasslands in southern Democratic Republic of Congo, Namibia, Tanzania, Zambia and more concentrated in the Okavango Delta in Botswana. Nearly one-third of all puku are found in protected areas, zoos, and national parks due to their diminishing habitat.

== Description ==
Puku stand about 80 cm (31 in) at the shoulder and weigh from 70 to 80 kg (150 to 180 lb). The puku is sandy brown in colour, with the underbelly a slightly lighter brown. The coat is rougher than that of the similar-sized southern reedbuck, lechwe or impala, or the smaller oribi. Males have horns which are ridge-structured, 50 cm (20 in) long, and lyre-shaped.

== Subspecies ==
There are two subspecies, the Senga Puku (Kobus vardonii senganus) and the southern puku (Kobus vardonii vardonii).

== Ecology ==
Puku are found almost exclusively in marshy grassland and dambos, where they eat grasses. The puku diet is flexible in regards to type of grasses consumed. There is little dietary competition with other bovids. This species is crepuscular, active in the early morning and late afternoon. When scared, puku repeat a shrill whistle sound. Females gather in herds of up to 20 individuals. During the rainy season, herds will come together for added safety, typically reaching around 50 females. Males hold territories and attempt to persuade herds of females to stay within their territories for as long as possible. In the wet season, due to large floods in their habitat they migrate to a higher elevation and in the dry season remain near water.

== Gallery ==
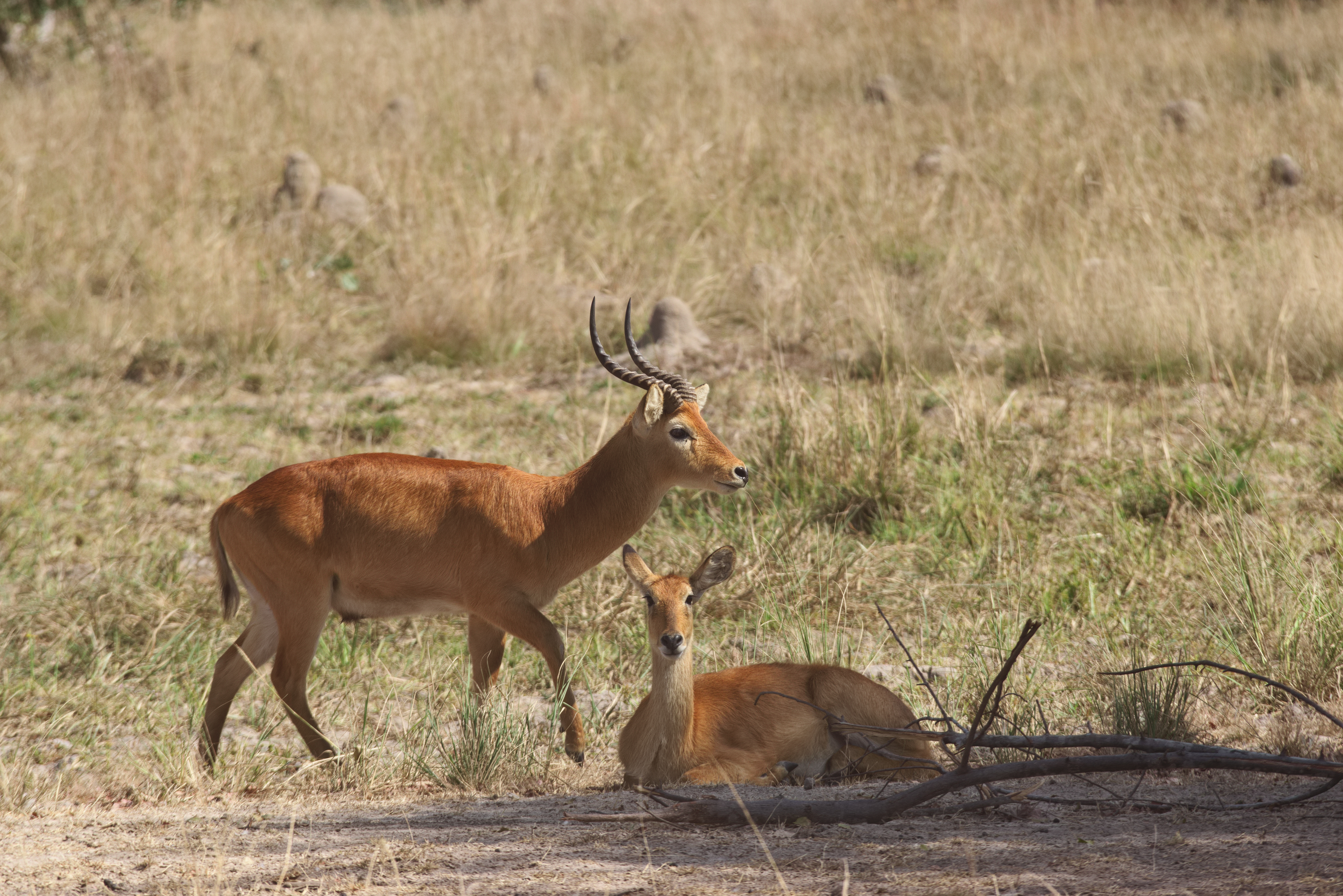
Male and female Kobus vardonii, Kafue National Park, Zambia

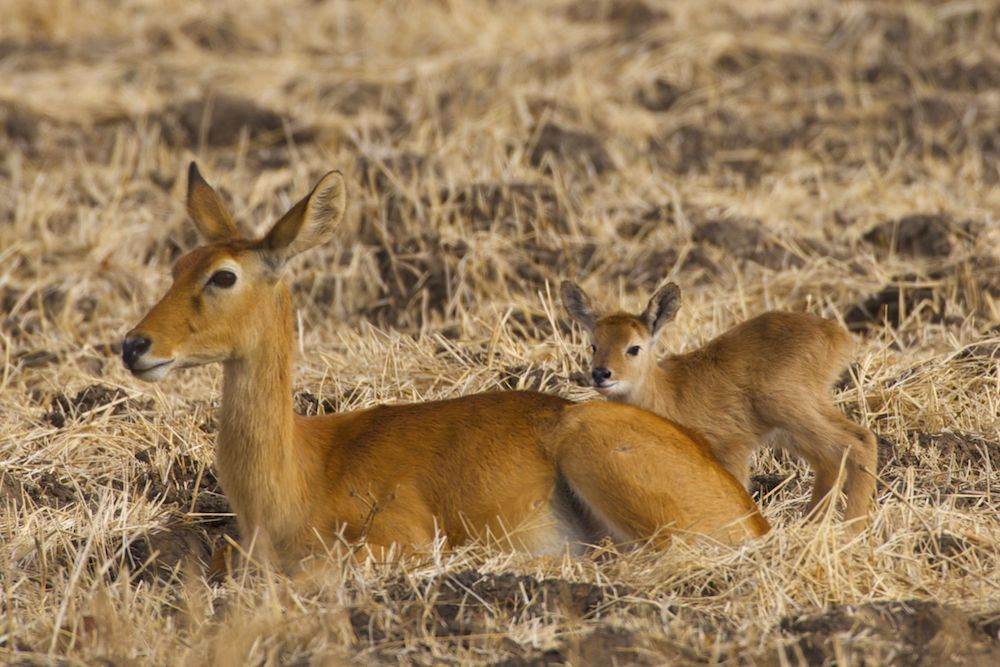
Female K. v. senganus and fawn, in South Luangwa NP, Zambia

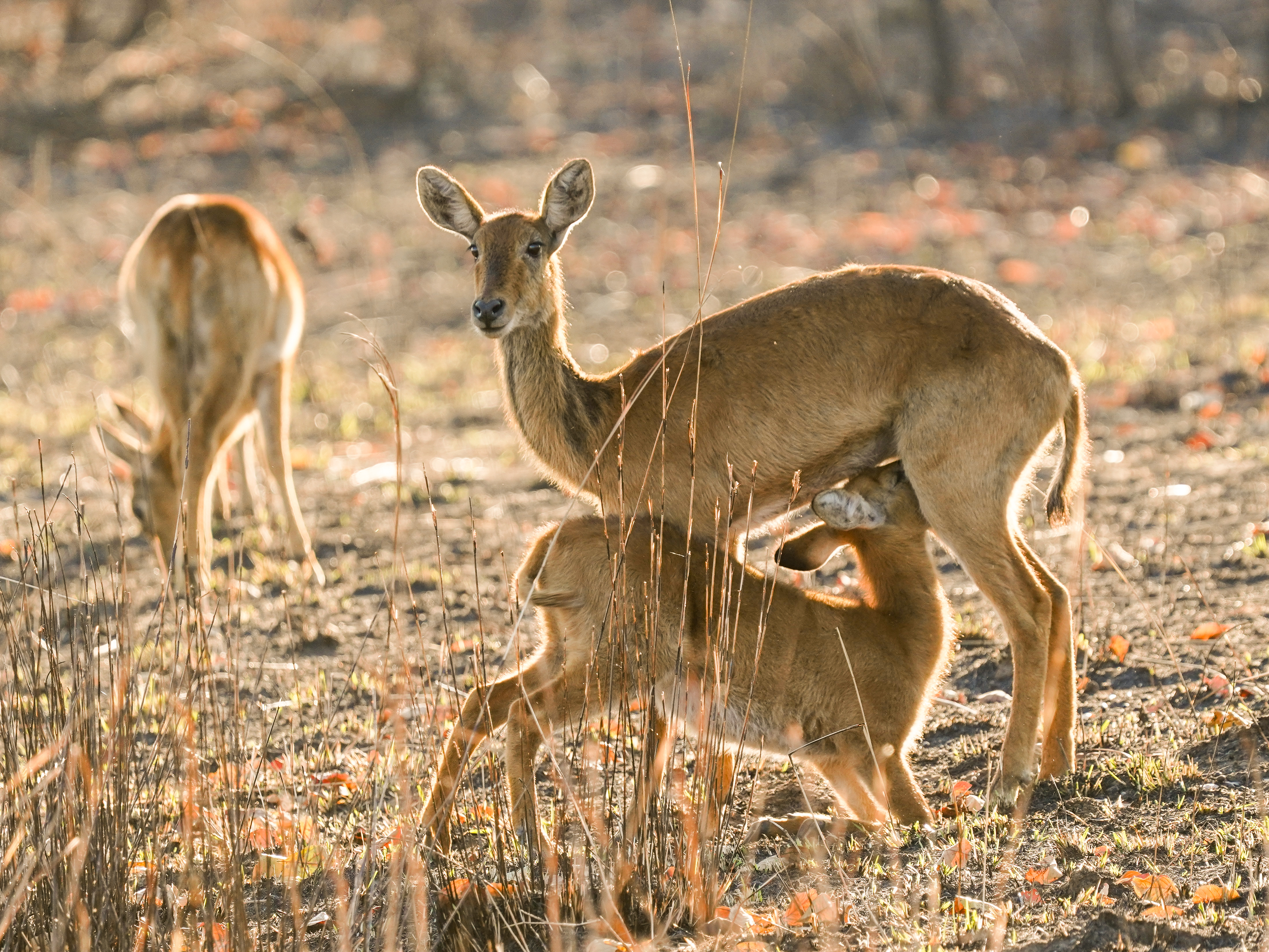
Kobus vardonii female suckling fawn, Kafue National Park, Zambia

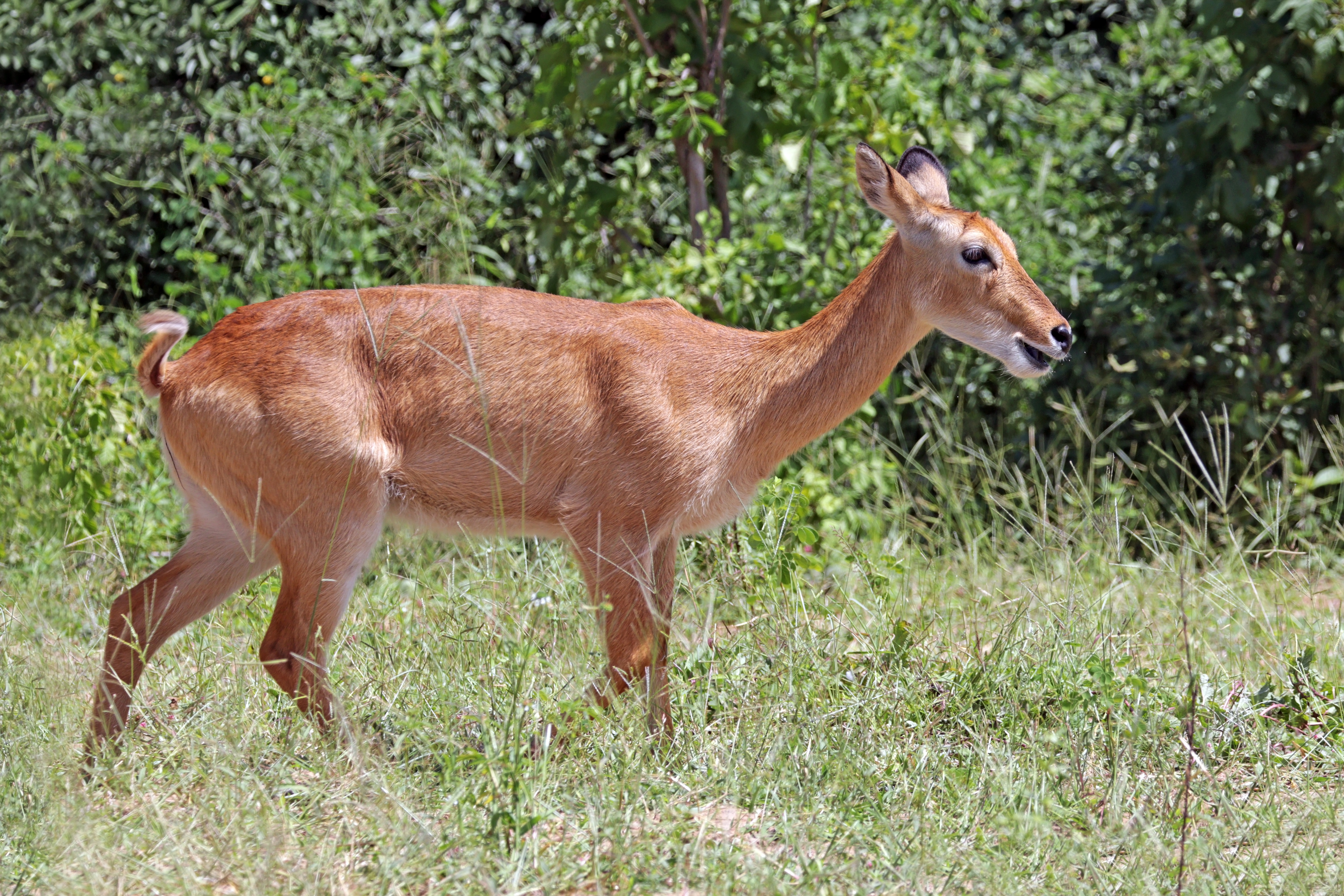
Female K. v. vardonii, in Chobe National Park, Botswana

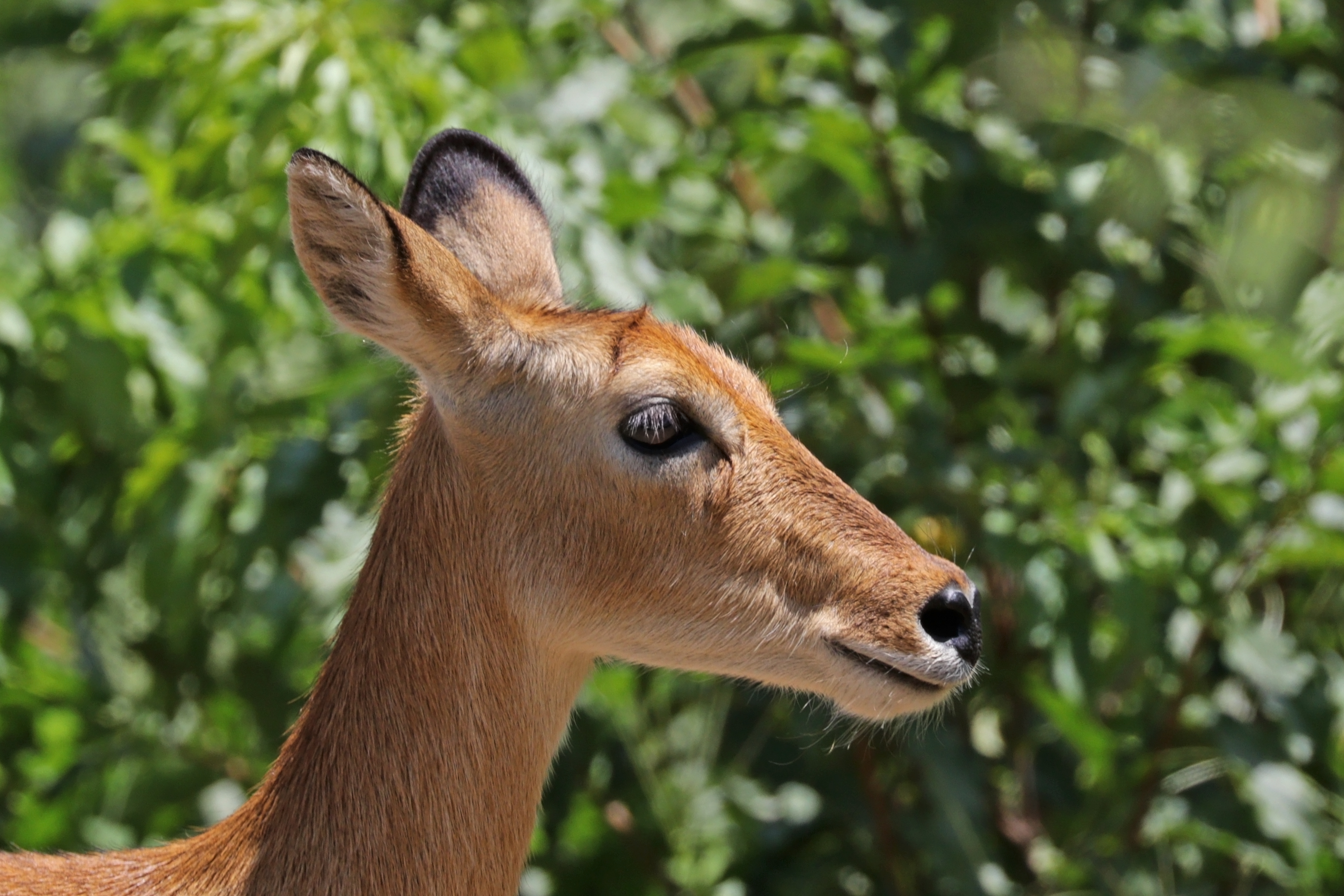
Female K. v. vardonii, in Chobe National Park, Botswana

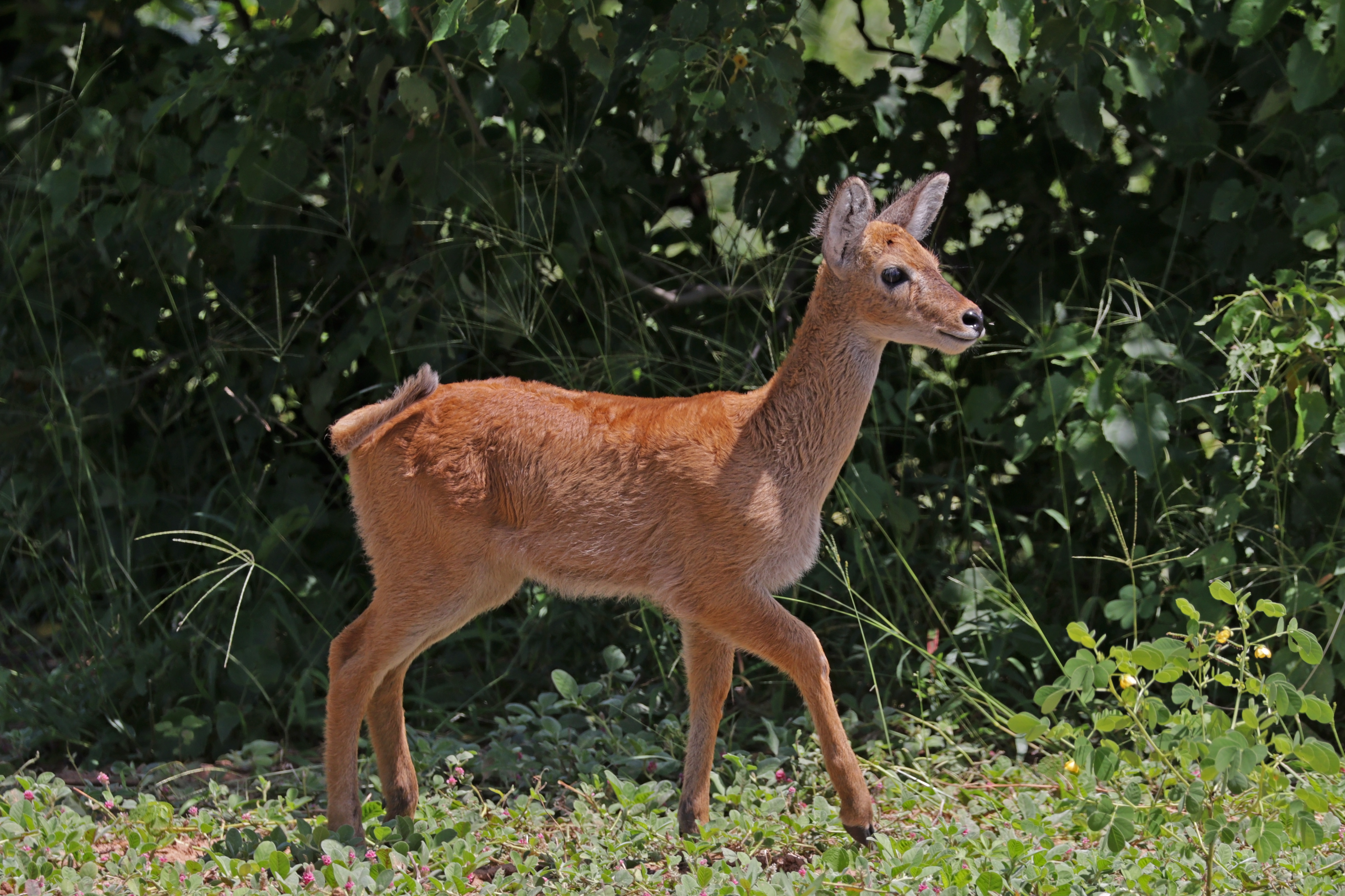
K. v. vardonii fawn, in Chobe National Park, Botswana
