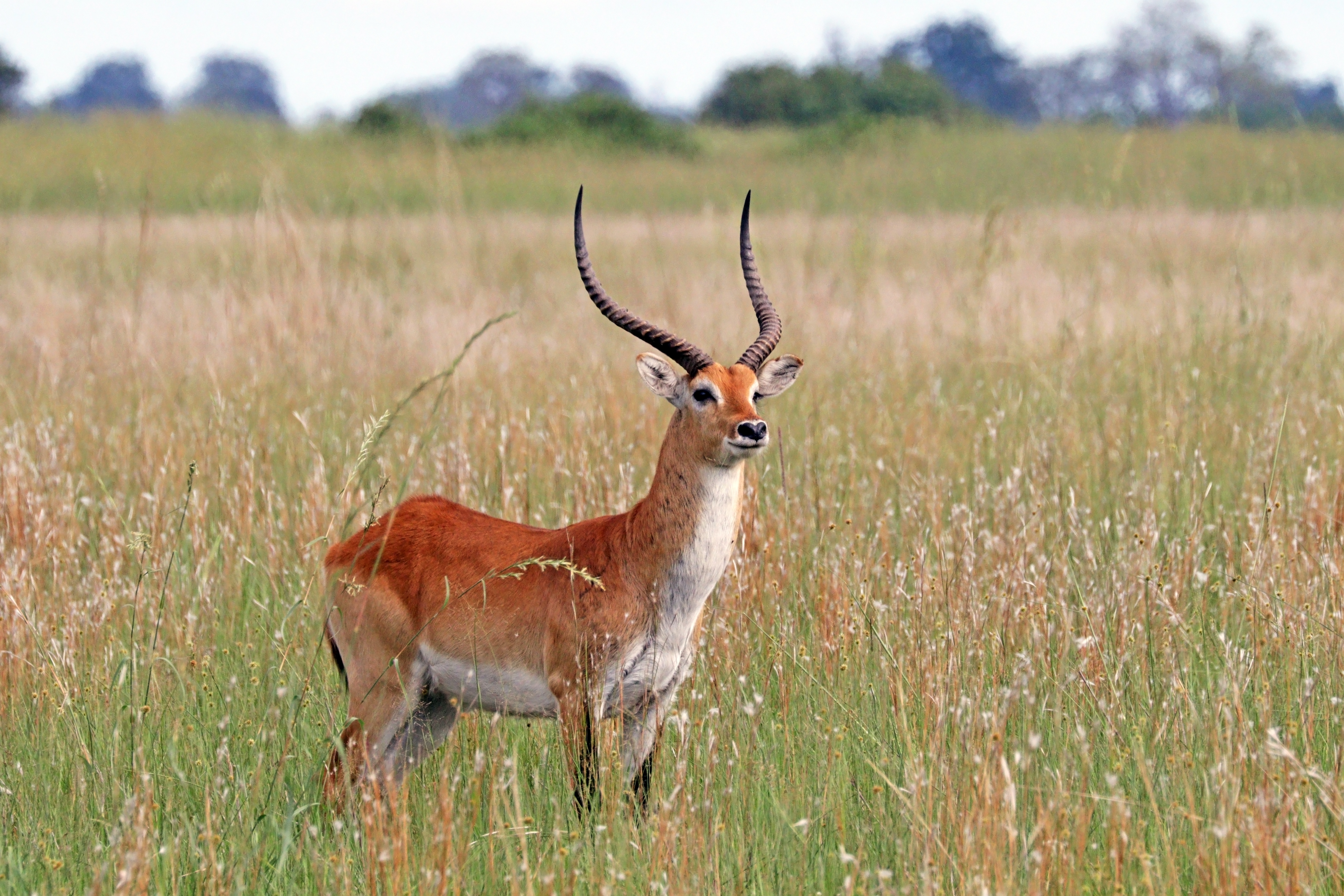
- male K. l. leche Nkasa Rupara National Park, Namibia

Conservation status
- Near Threatened (IUCN 3.1)
- CITES Appendix II

Scientific classification
- Kingdom: Animalia
- Phylum: Chordata
- Class: Mammalia
- Order: Artiodactyla
- Family: Bovidae
- Genus: Kobus
- Species: K. leche

Binomial name
- Kobus leche Gray, 1850

Subspecies
- Kobus leche leche; Kobus leche kafuensis; † Kobus leche robertsi; Kobus leche smithemani
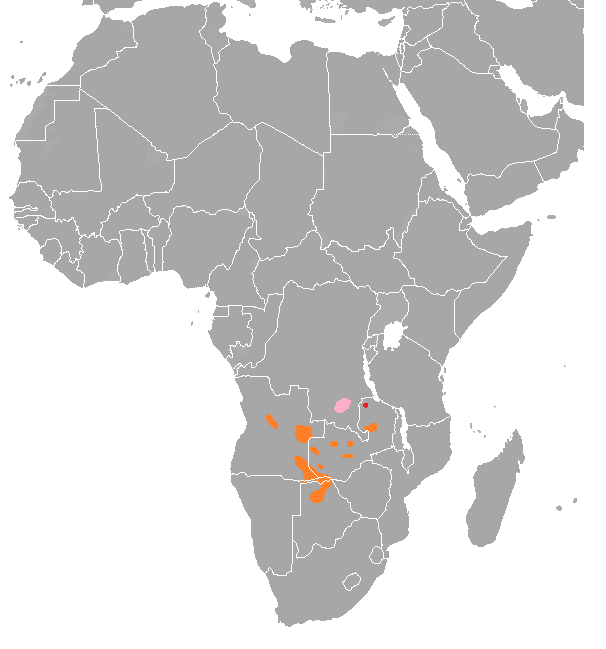
- native range extinct population: K. l. robertsi critically endangered population: K. (l.) anselli

Synonyms
- Onotragus leche

= Lechwe =

Species of mammal

The lechwe, red lechwe, or southern lechwe (Kobus leche) is an antelope found in wetlands of south-central Africa.

== Range ==
The lechwe is native to Botswana, Zambia, southeastern Democratic Republic of the Congo, northeastern Namibia, and eastern Angola, especially in the Okavango Delta, Kafue Flats, and Bangweulu Wetlands. The species is fairly common in zoos and wild animal farms.

== Description ==
Adult lechwe typically stand 90 to 100 cm (35 to 39 in) at the shoulder and generally weigh from 50 to 120 kg (110 to 260 lb), with males being larger than females. They are golden brown with white bellies. Males are darker in colour, but exact hue and amount of blackish on the front legs, chest and body varies depending on subspecies. The long, spiral horns are vaguely lyre-shaped and borne only by males. The hind legs are somewhat longer in proportion than in other antelopes to ease long-distance running on marshy soil.

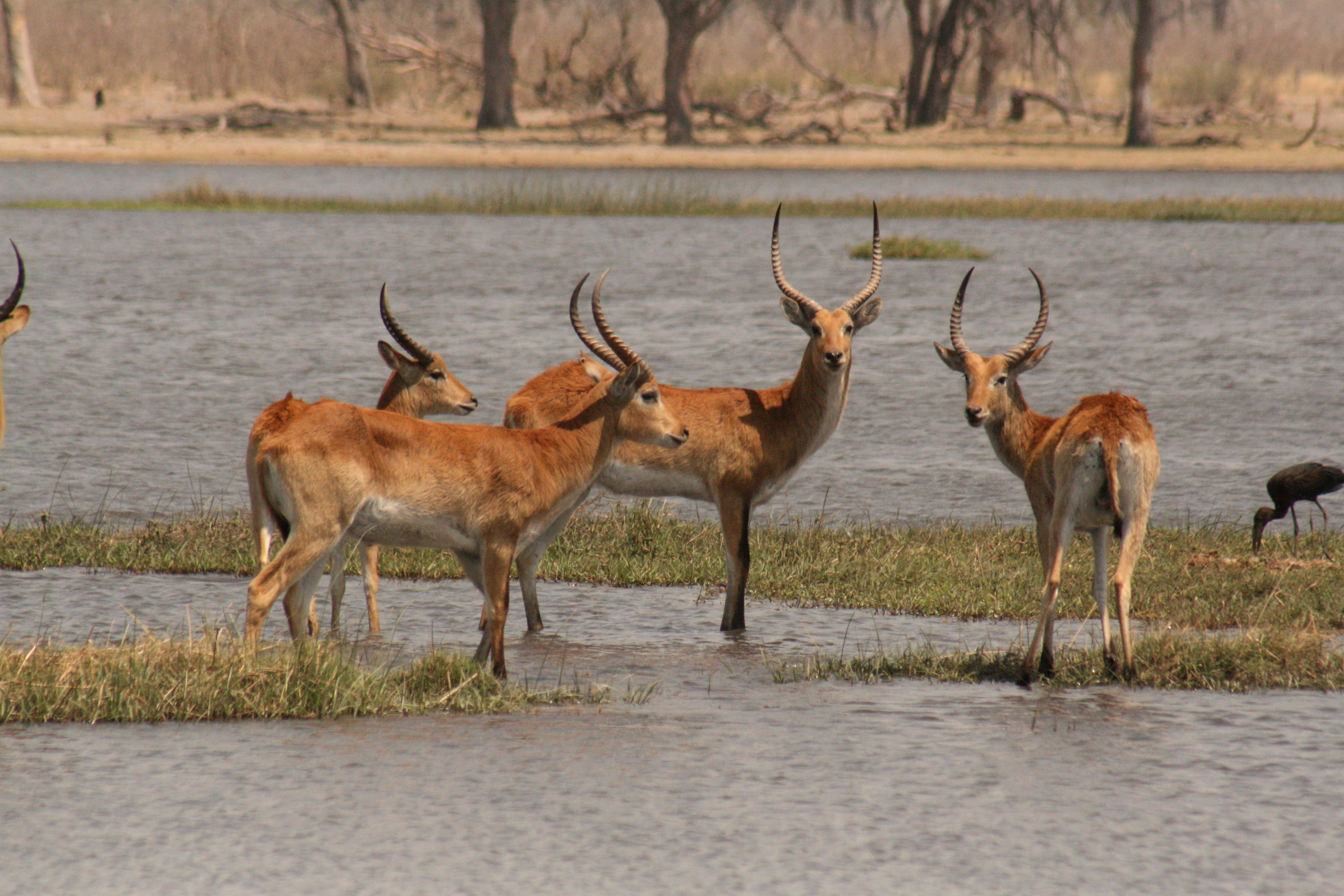
Adult red lechwes in the Okavango Delta, Botswana

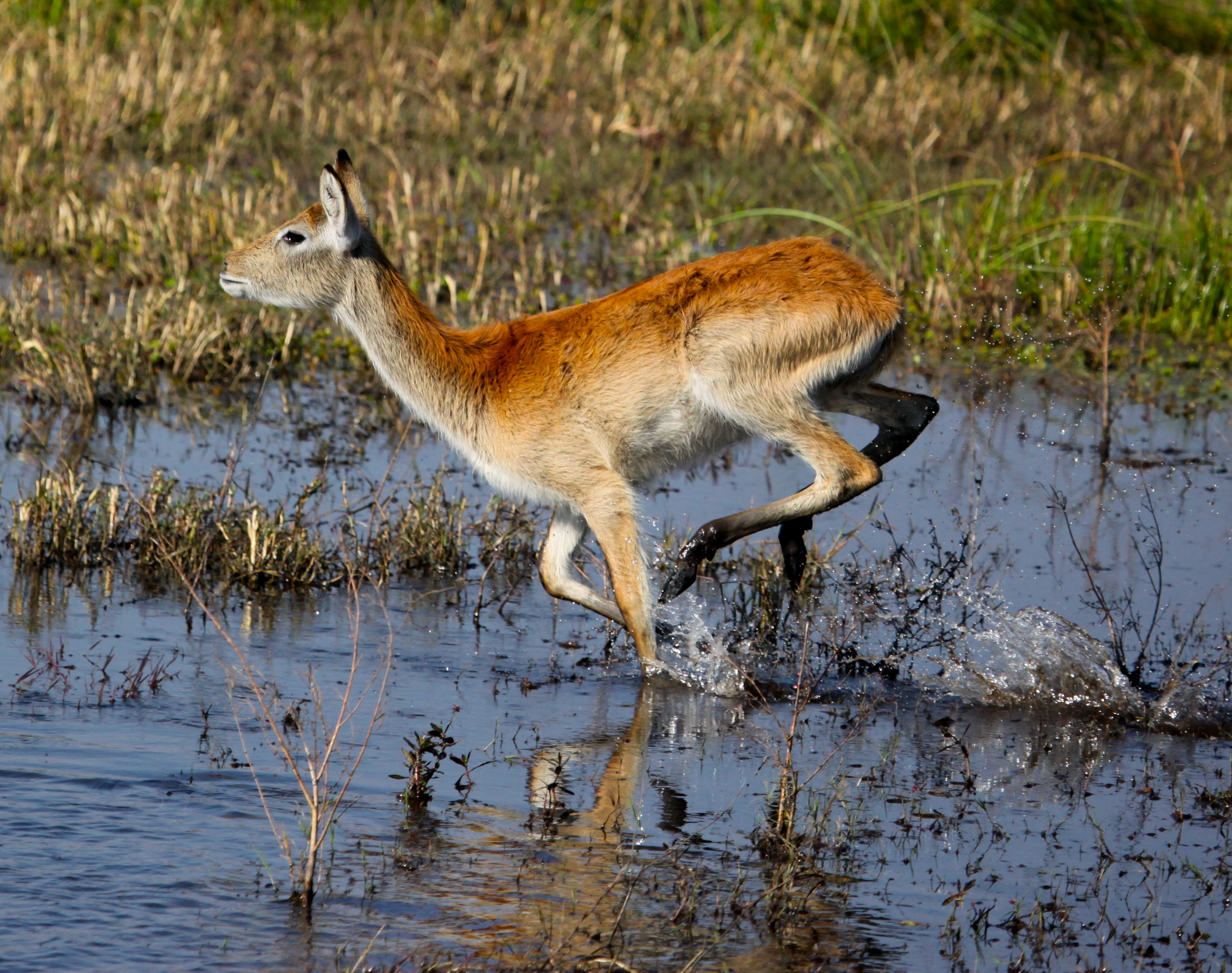
Female red lechwe,
Okavango Delta

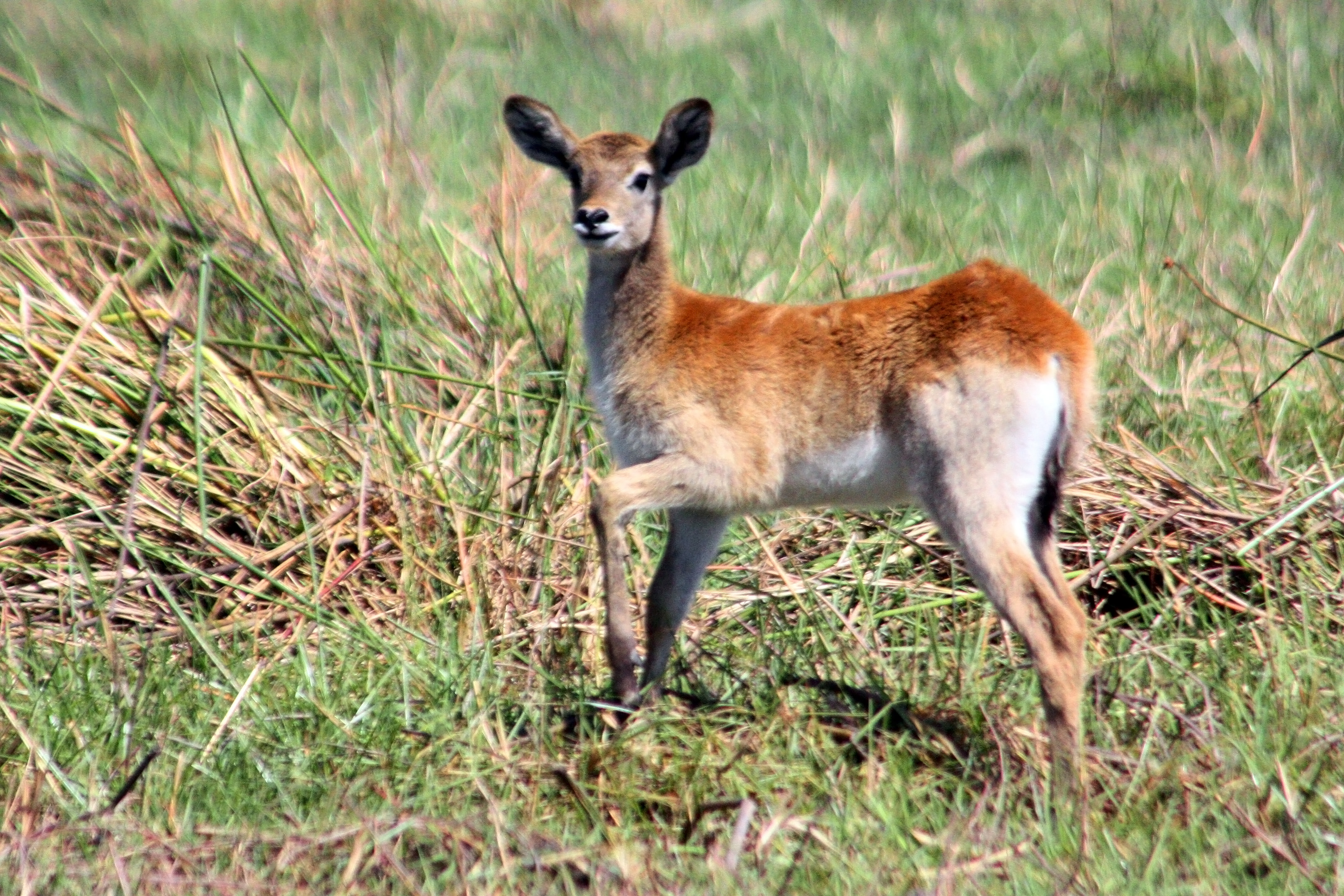
Juvenile red lechwe,
Okavango Delta

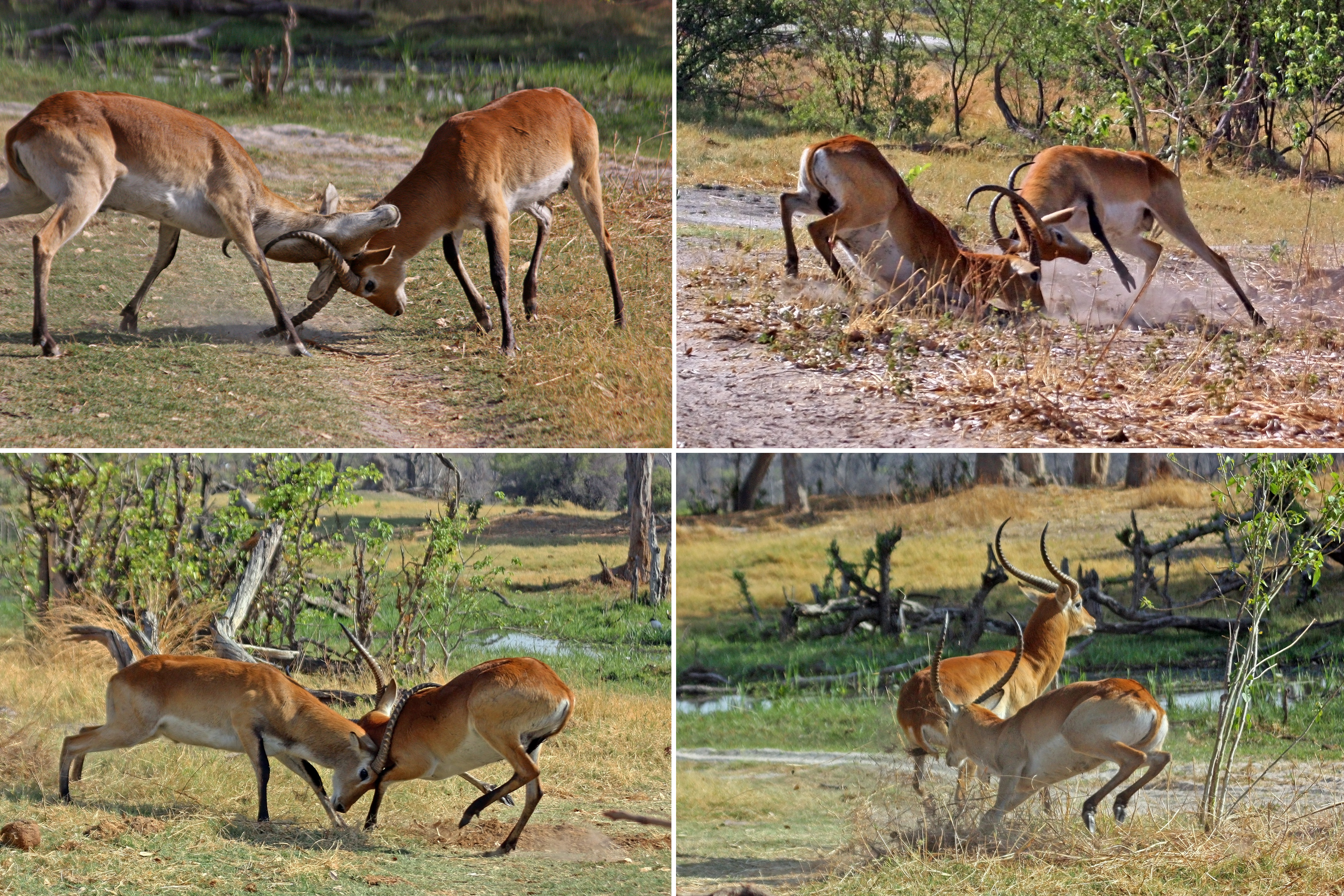
Male red lechwes fighting,
Okavango Delta

== Habitats ==
Lechwe are found in marshy areas where they are an important herbivore of aquatic plants, as well as grasses that are found in flooded meadows. They use the knee-deep water as protection from predators. Their legs are covered in a water-repellent substance which allows them to run quite fast in knee-deep water. Lechwe are diurnal. They gather in herds which can include many thousands of individuals. Herds are usually all of one sex, but during mating season they mix.

== Taxonomy ==
=== Subspecies ===
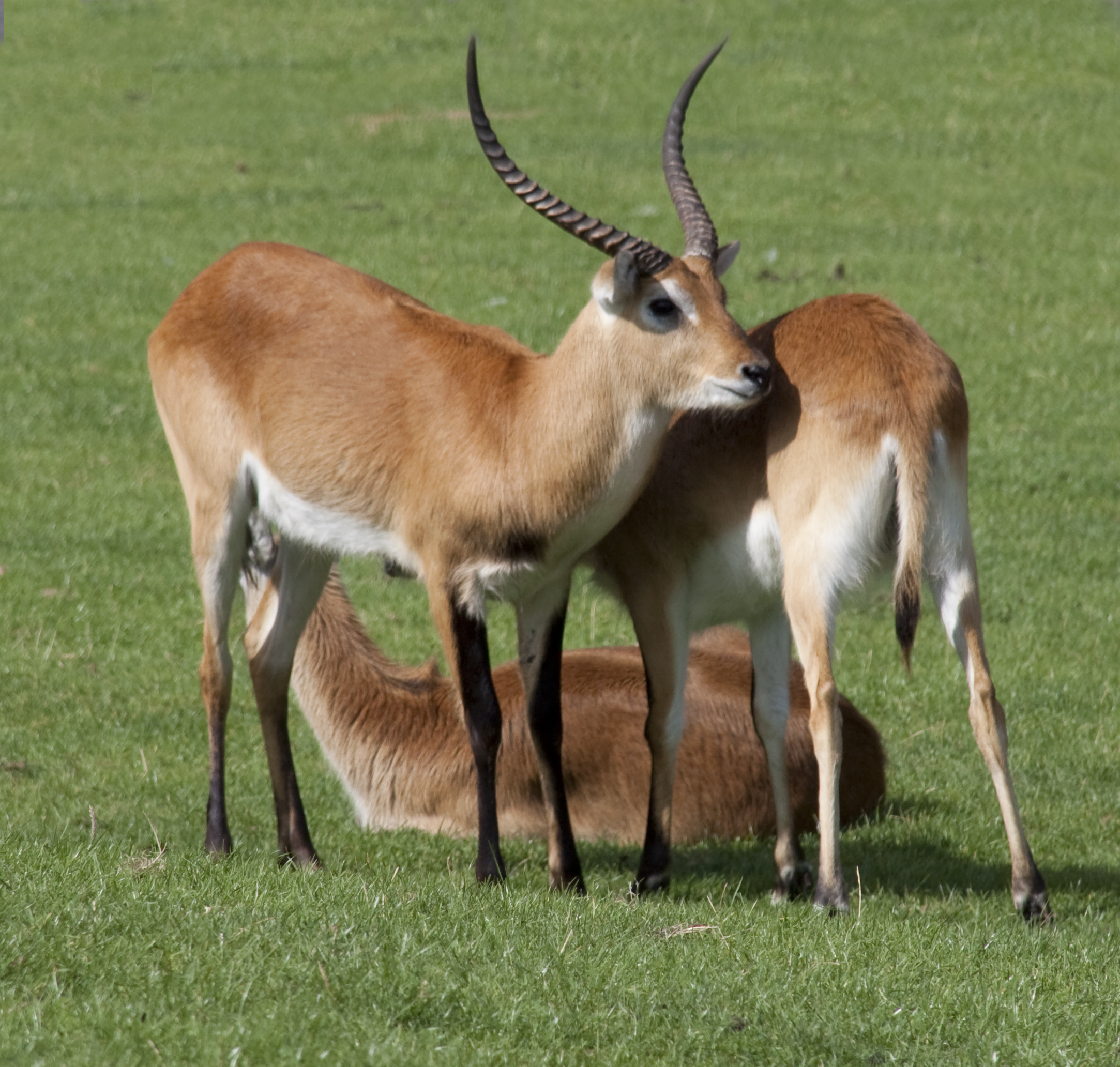
Kafue lechwes (K. l. kafuensis) where the male has more black to the front legs and chest than the red and Upemba lechwes, but less than the black lechwe that also has some blackish to the side of the body

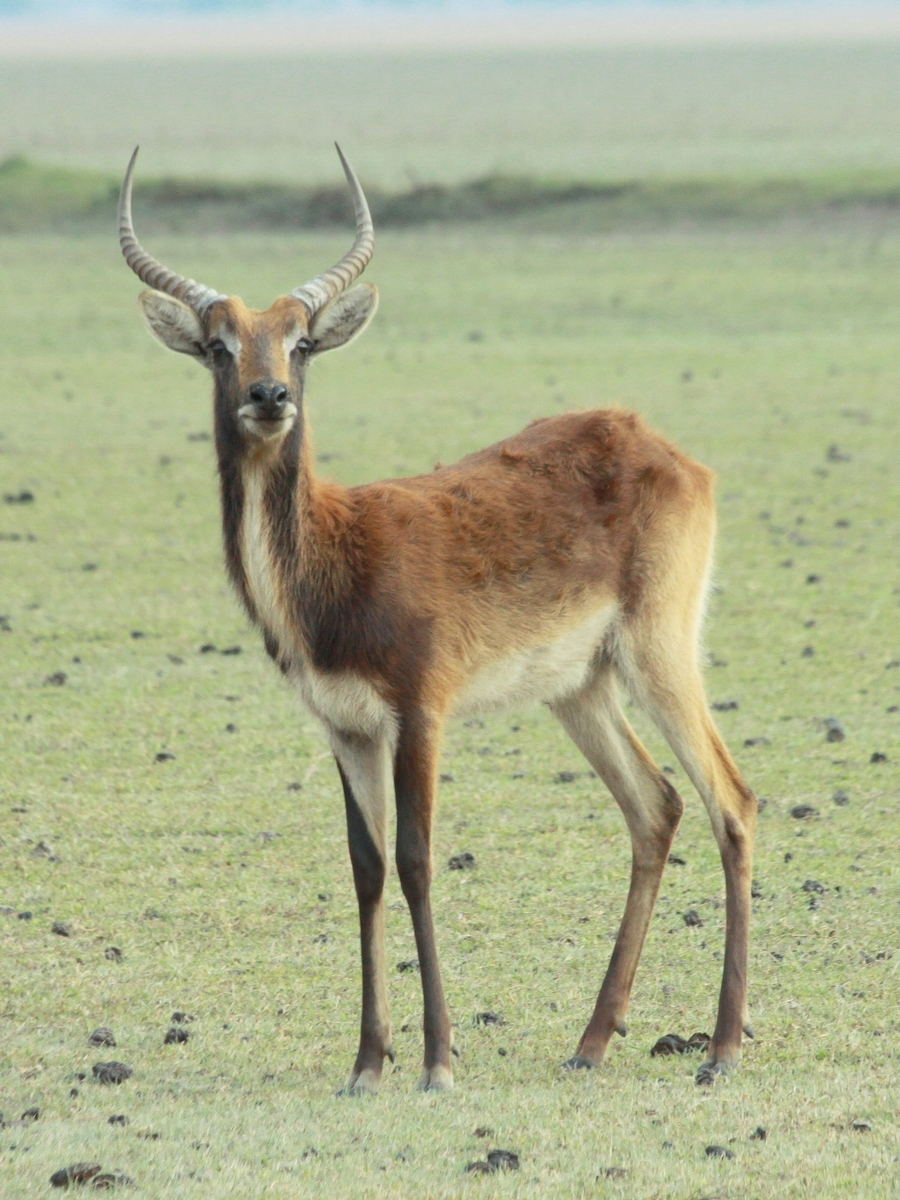
Black lechwe (K. l. smithemani)

Four subspecies of the lechwe have been recognized.

- Common red lechwe (Kobus leche leche) (Gray, 1850) - Widely distributed in the wetlands of Zimbabwe, Botswana, Namibia and Zambia.
- Kafue Flats lechwe (Kobus leche kafuensis) (Haltenorth, 1963) - It is confined within the Kafue Flats (seasonally inundated flood-plain on the Kafue River, Zambia).
- † Roberts' lechwe (Kobus leche robertsi) (Rothschild, 1907) - Formerly found in northeastern Zambia, now extinct. Also called the Kawambwa lechwe.
- Black lechwe (Kobus leche smithemani) (Lydekker, 1900) - Found in the Bangweulu region of Zambia.

In addition, the Upemba lechwe (Kobus anselli) and the extinct Cape lechwe (Kobus venterae) are also considered subspecies by some authorities (as Kobus leche anselli and Kobus leche venterae).

Although related and sharing the name "lechwe", the Nile lechwe (K. megaceros) is consistently recognized as a separate species.

== Reproduction ==
Lechwe mate during rain seasons of November to February. They have a gestation period of seven to eight months so a majority of calves are born from July to September. Although rare, hybrids between lechwe and waterbuck have been observed.
