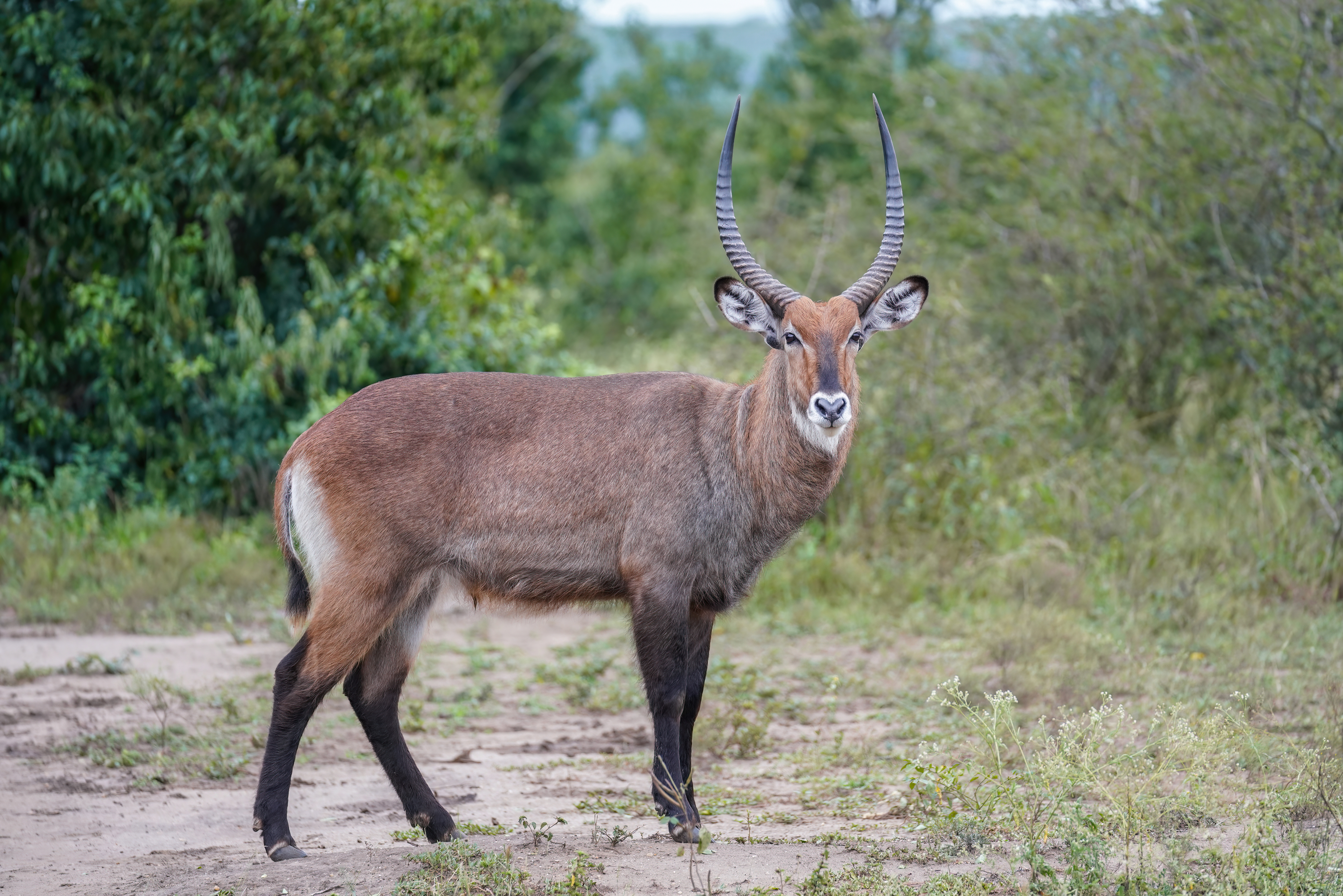
- Male K. e. defassa Queen Elizabeth National Park, Uganda
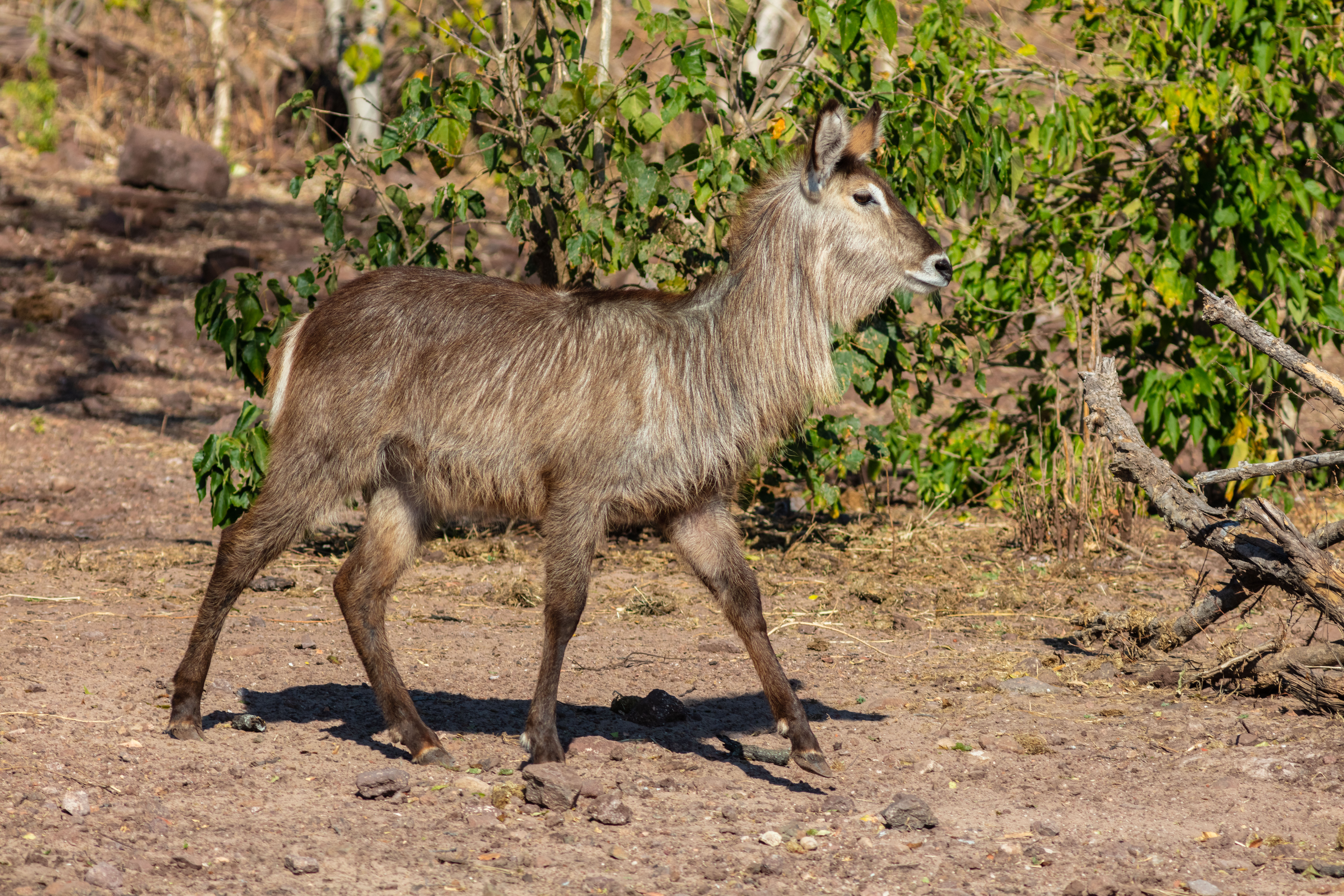
- Female K. e. ellipsiprymnus Chobe National Park, Botswana

Conservation status
- Least Concern (IUCN 3.1)

Scientific classification
- Kingdom: Animalia
- Phylum: Chordata
- Class: Mammalia
- Order: Artiodactyla
- Family: Bovidae
- Genus: Kobus
- Species: K. ellipsiprymnus

Binomial name
- Kobus ellipsiprymnus (Ogilby, 1833)

Subspecies
- See text
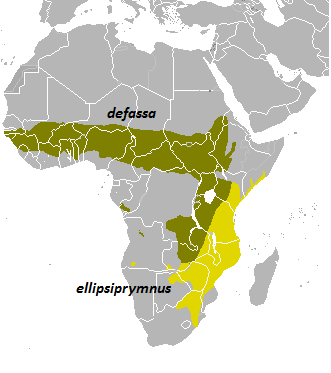
- Distribution of subspecies of waterbuck

= Waterbuck =

Species of antelope

The waterbuck (Kobus ellipsiprymnus) is a large antelope found widely in sub-Saharan Africa. It is in the genus Kobus of the family Bovidae. It was first described by Irish naturalist William Ogilby in 1833. Its 13 subspecies are grouped under two varieties: the common or ellipsiprymnus waterbuck and the defassa waterbuck. Their coat colour varies from brown to grey. The long, spiral horns, present only on males, curve backward, then forward, and are 55–99 cm (22–39 in) long.

Waterbucks are rather sedentary in nature. As gregarious animals, they may form herds consisting of six to thirty individuals. These groups are either nursery herds with females and their offspring or bachelor herds. Males start showing territorial behaviour from the age of five years, but are most dominant from six to nine. The waterbuck cannot tolerate dehydration in hot weather, and thus inhabits areas close to sources of water. Predominantly a grazer, the waterbuck is mostly found on grassland. In equatorial regions, breeding takes place throughout the year, but births are at their peak in the rainy season. The gestational period lasts 7–8 months, followed by the birth of a single calf.

Waterbucks inhabit scrub and savanna areas along rivers, lakes, and valleys. Due to their requirement for grasslands and water, waterbucks have a sparse ecotone distribution. The IUCN lists the waterbuck as being of least concern. More specifically, the common waterbuck is listed as of least concern, while the defassa waterbuck is near threatened. The population trend for both is downwards, especially that of the defassa, with large populations being eliminated from certain habitats because of poaching and human disturbance.

== Taxonomy and etymology ==
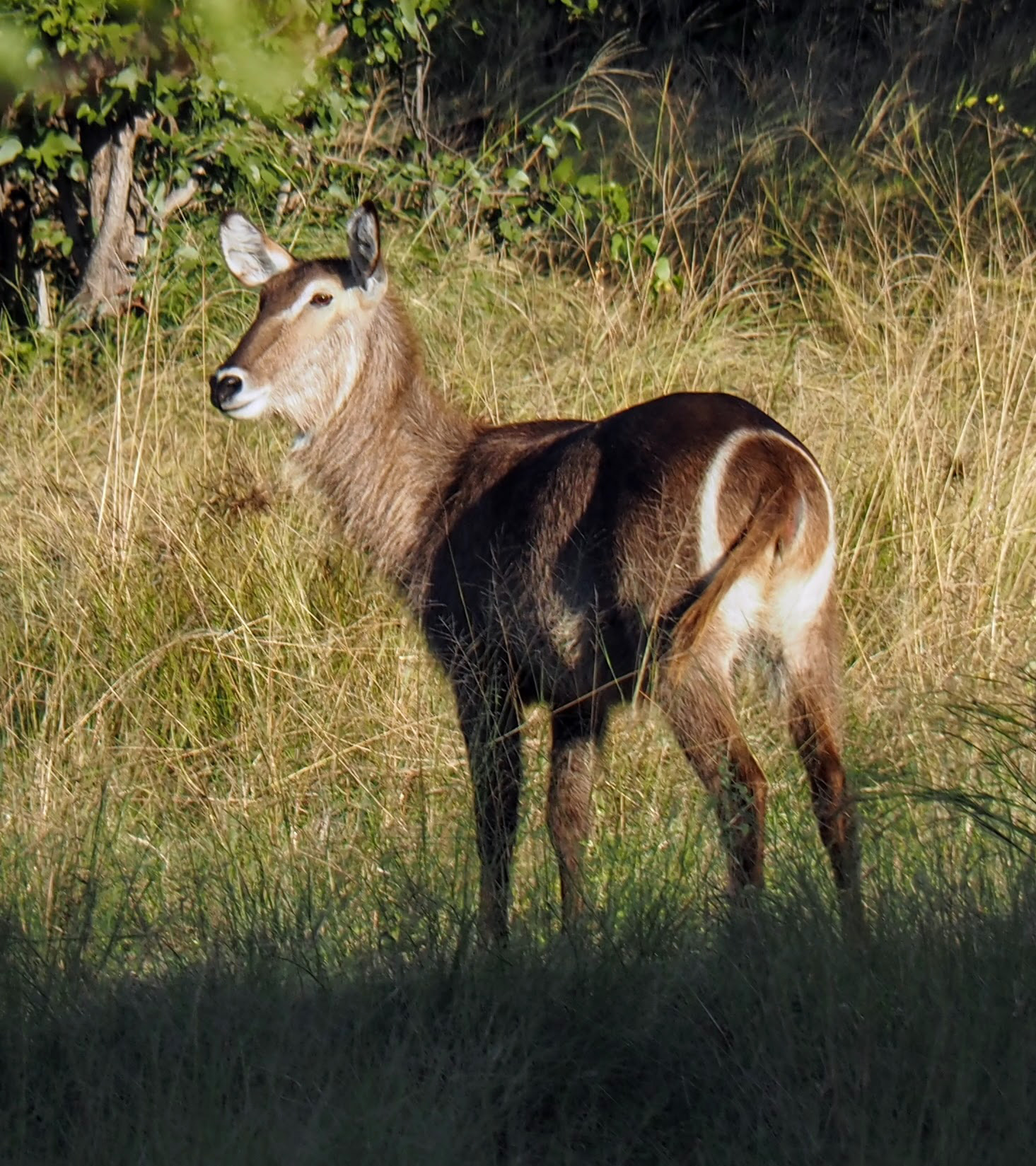
Common waterbuck in Botswana

The scientific name of the waterbuck is Kobus ellipsiprymnus. The waterbuck is one of the six species of the genus Kobus in the family Bovidae. It was first described by Irish naturalist William Ogilby in 1833. The generic name Kobus is a Neo-Latin word, originating from an African name, koba. The specific name ellipsiprymnus refers to the white, elliptical ring on the rump, from the Greek ellipes (ellipse) and prymnos (prumnos, hind part). The animal acquired the vernacular name "waterbuck" due to its heavy dependence on water as compared to other antelopes and its ability to enter into water for defence.

The type specimen of the waterbuck was collected by South African hunter-explorer Andrew Steedman in 1832. This specimen was named Antilope ellipsiprymnus by Ogilby in 1833. This species was transferred to the genus Kobus in 1840, becoming K. ellipsiprymnus. It is usually known as the common waterbuck. In 1835, German naturalist Eduard Rüppell collected another specimen, which differed from Steedman's specimen in having a prominent white ring on its rump. Considering it a separate species, Rüppell gave it the Amharic name "defassa" waterbuck and scientific name Antilope defassa. Modern taxonomists, however, consider the common waterbuck and the defassa waterbuck a single species, K. ellipsiprymnus, given the large number of instances of hybridisation between the two. Interbreeding between the two takes place in the Nairobi National Park owing to extensive overlapping of habitats. Though both groups occur in Zambia as well, their ranges are separated by relief features or by the Muchinga escarpment.

=== Evolution ===
Not many fossils of the waterbuck have been found. Fossils were scarce in the Cradle of Humankind, occurring only in a few pockets of the Swartkrans. On the basis of Valerius Geist's theories about the relation of social evolution and dispersal in ungulates during the Pleistocene, the ancestral home of the waterbuck is considered to be the eastern coast of Africa, with the Horn of Africa to the north and the East African Rift Valley to the west.

=== Subspecies ===
On the basis of coat colour, 37 subspecies of the waterbucks had been initially recognised. They were classified into two groups: the ellipsiprymnus waterbuck group and the defassa waterbuck group. Owing to the large number of variations in the coat colour in the defassa waterbuck group, as many as 29 subspecies were included in it; the ellipsiprymnus waterbuck group consisted of eight subspecies. In 1971, however, the number of subspecies was reduced to 13 (4 for the ellipsenprymnus waterbuck group and 9 for the defassa waterbuck group). The subspecies are listed below, along with notes about the former subspecies which were recombined into a single subspecies:

- K. e. ellipsiprymnus (ellipsen waterbuck, common or ringed waterbuck) group: Found in the Webi Shebeli river valley in southeastern Ethiopia; the Juba and Webi Shebeli river valleys in Somalia; essentially east of the Rift Valley in Kenya and Tanzania; east of the Rift Valley in the middle Zambezi and Luangwa valleys in Zambia; Malawi; Mozambique; east of the Kwando River in the Caprivi Strip of Namibia; eastern and northern Botswana; Zimbabwe; and eastern and northern Transvaal in South Africa. Its distribution slightly overlaps that of the typical defassa along the Rift Valley in Kenya and Tanzania, and that of the Crawshay defassa in the Rift Valley in Zambia.

Includes the following four subspecies:
- K. e. ellipsiprymnus Ogilby, 1833 (southern Africa)
- K. e. kondensis Matschie, 1911 (including K. e. lipuwa, K. e. kulu) (southern Tanzania)
- K. e. pallidus Matschie, 1911 (Webi Shebeli drainage in Ethiopia, and Juba and Webi Shebeli drainages in Somalia)
- K. e. thikae Matschie, 1910 (including K. e. kuru and K. e. canescens) (southern and eastern Kenya and northeastern Tanzania)

- K. e. defassa (defassa waterbuck) group: Found mostly west of the Gregory Rift, ranging from Ethiopia west to Senegal and south to Zambia.

Includes the following subspecies:
- Angolan defassa waterbuck (K. e. penricei) W. Rothschild, 1895 Can be found in Southern Gabon, southern Congo (Brazzaville), Angola, southwestern Congo (Kinshasa), and marginally in Namibia along the Okavango River.
- Crawshay defassa waterbuck or Rhodesian defassa waterbuck (K. e. crawshayi) P. L. Sclater, 1894 (including K. e. uwendensis, K. e. frommiand K. e. münzneri) Can be found in Zambia, from the upper Zambezi River eastward to the Muchinga escarpment (which is a southern extension of the Great Rift Valley). Also in adjoining parts of Katanga Province in Congo (Kinshasa).
- East African defassa waterbuck

- K. e. adolfi-friderici Matschie, 1906 (including K. e. fulvifrons, K. e. nzoiae and K. e. raineyi) (northeastern Tanzania west of the Rift Wall, and north into Kenya)
- K. e. defassa Rüppell, 1835 (including K. e. matschiei and K. e. hawashensis) (central and southern Ethiopia)
- K. e. harnieri Murie, 1867 (including K. e. avellanifrons, K. e. ugandae, K. e. dianae, K. e. ladoensis, K. e. cottoni, K. e. breviceps, K. e. albertensis and K. e. griseotinctus) (northeastern Congo [Kinshasa], Sudan, western Ethiopia, Uganda, western Kenya, Rwanda, Burundi and northwestern Tanzania)
- K. e. tjäderi Lönnberg, 1907 (including K. e. angusticeps and K. e. powelli) (Laikipia Plateau in Kenya)

- Sing-sing waterbuck

- K. e. annectens Schwarz, 1913 (including K. e. schubotzi) (C.A.R.)
- K. e. tschadensis Schwarz, 1913 (Chad)
- K. e. unctuosus Laurillard, 1842 (including K. e. togoensis) (Cameroon west to Senegal)

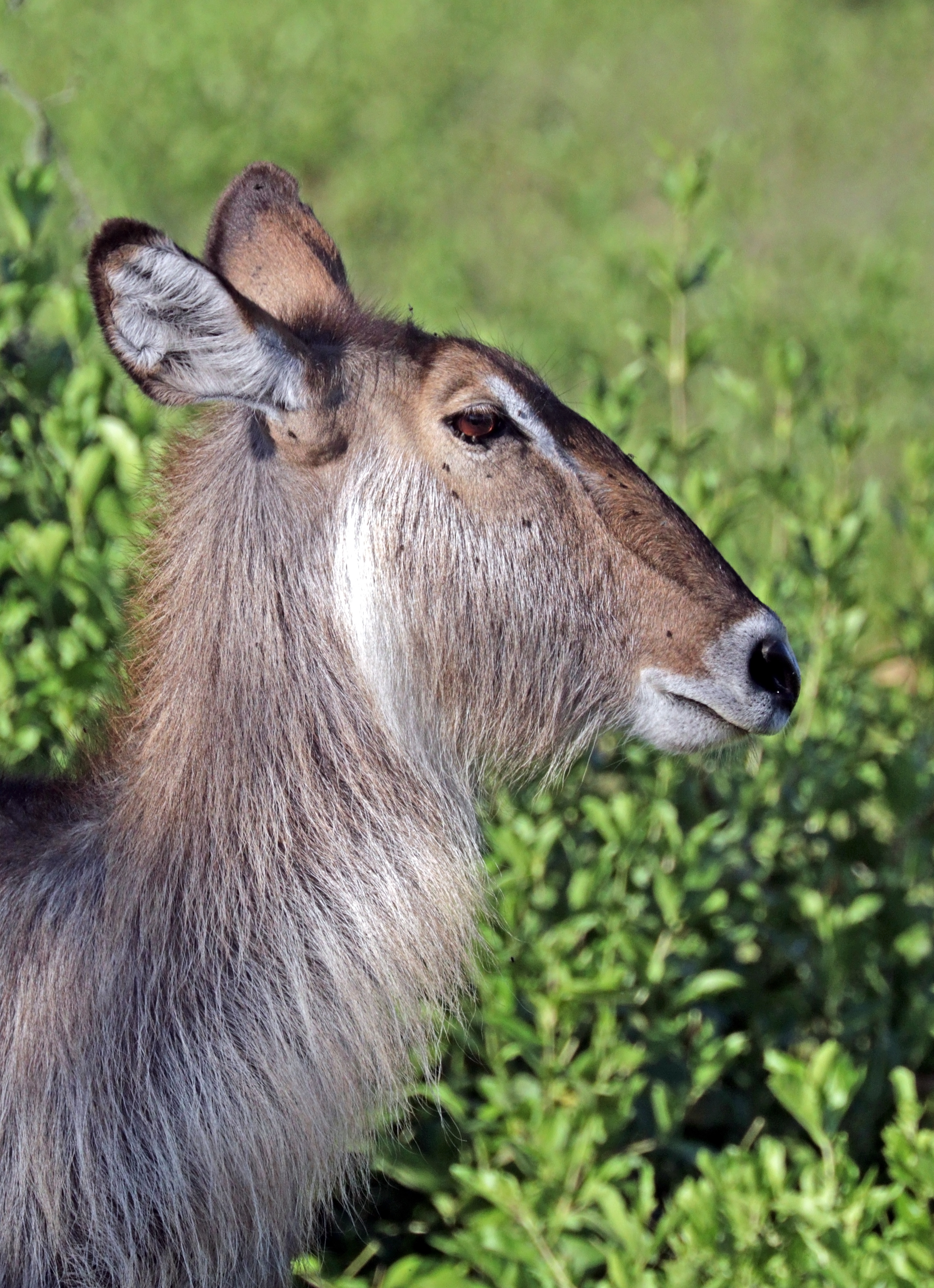
Female K. e. ellipsiprymnus, Zimbabwe

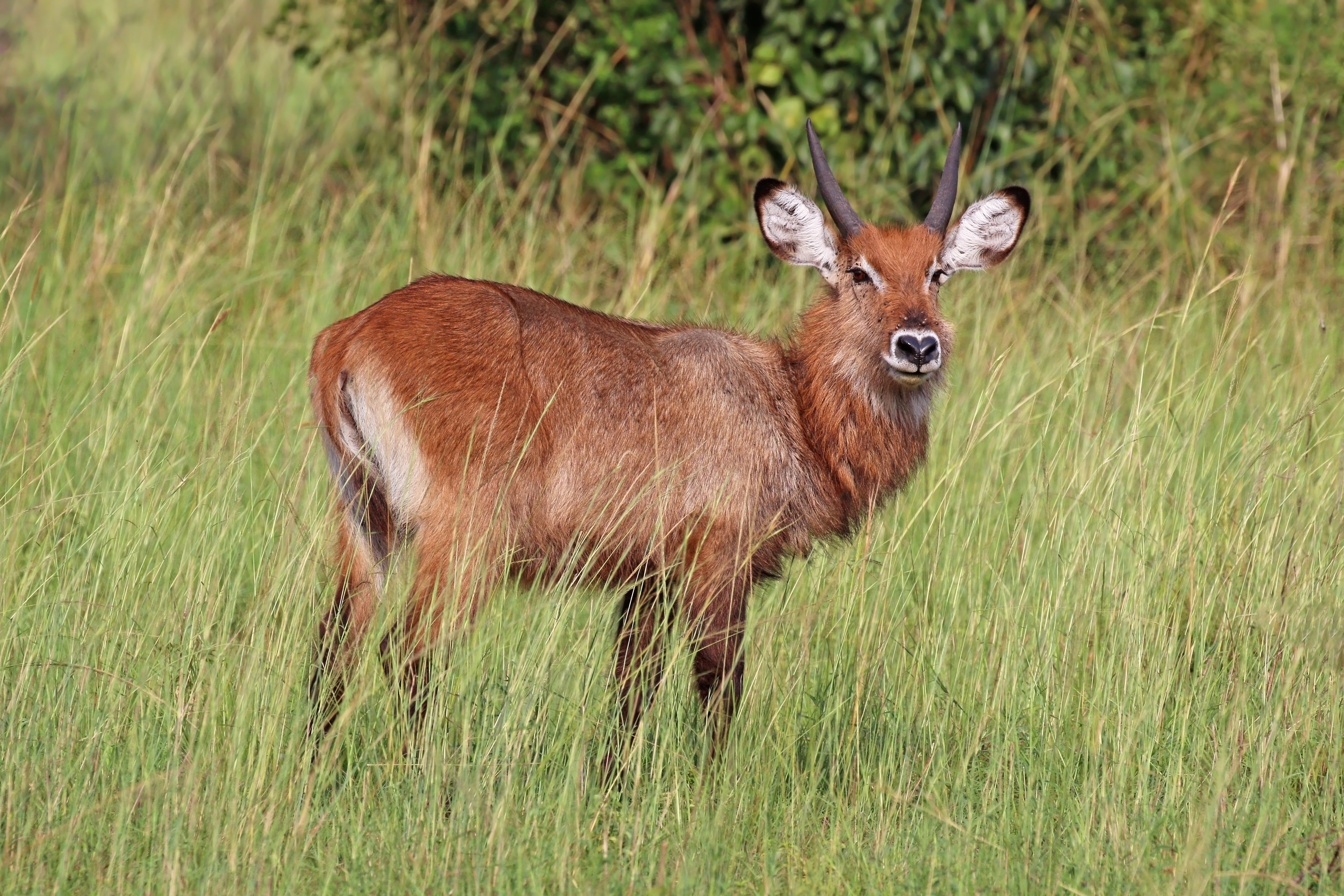
Juvenile male K. e. defassa
Queen Elizabeth National Park, Uganda

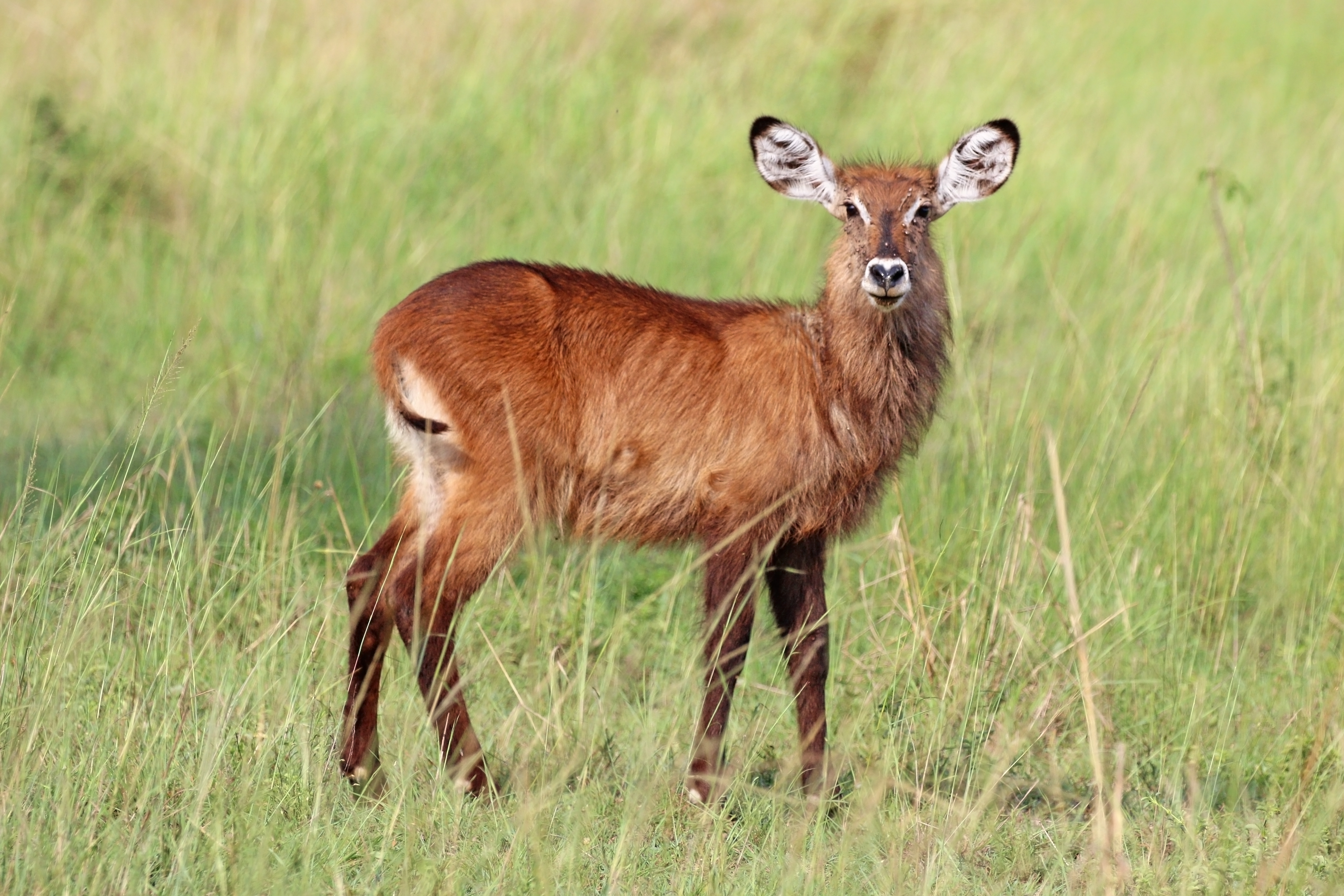
Juvenile female K. e. defassa
Queen Elizabeth National Park, Uganda

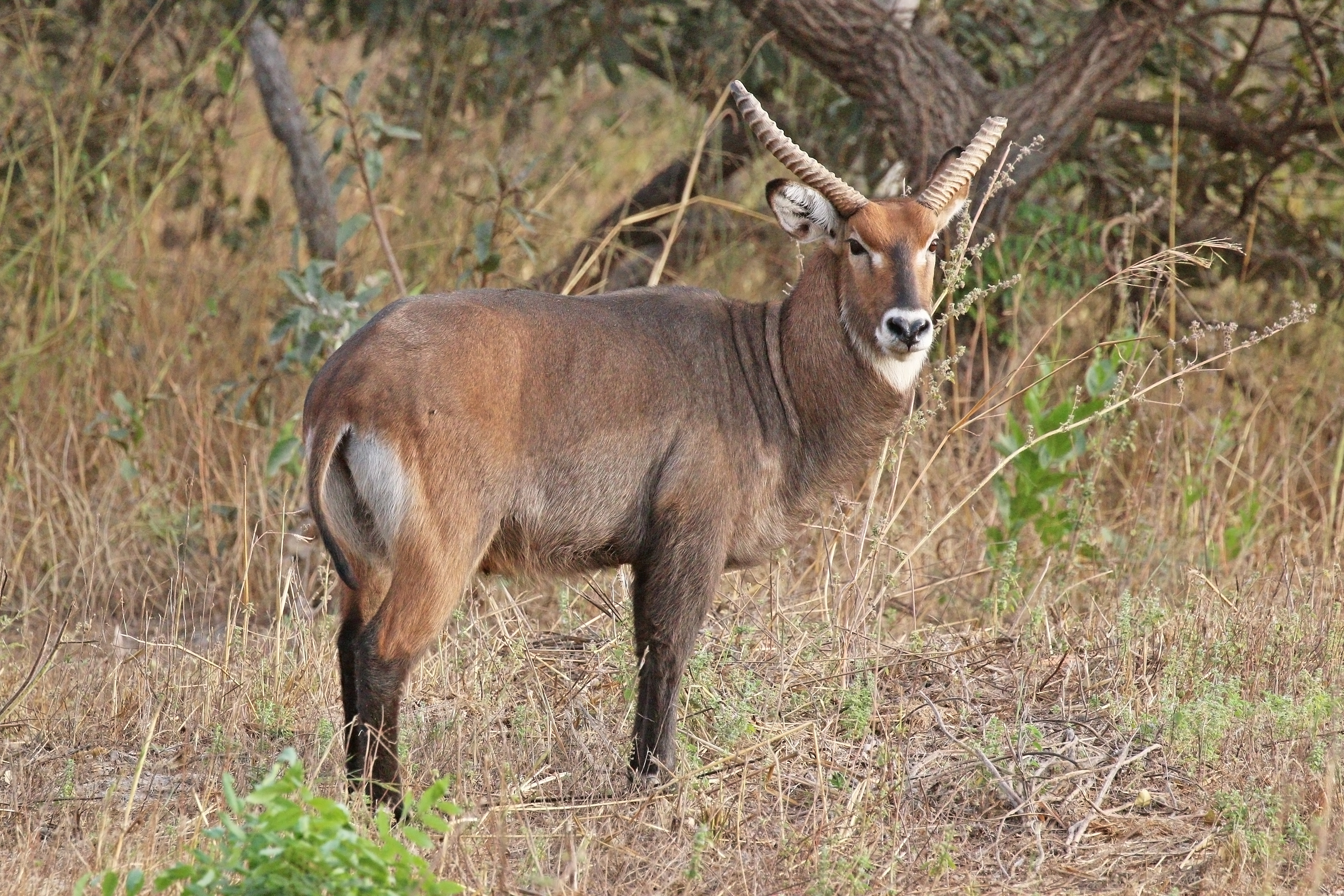
Male K. e. unctuosus
Senegal

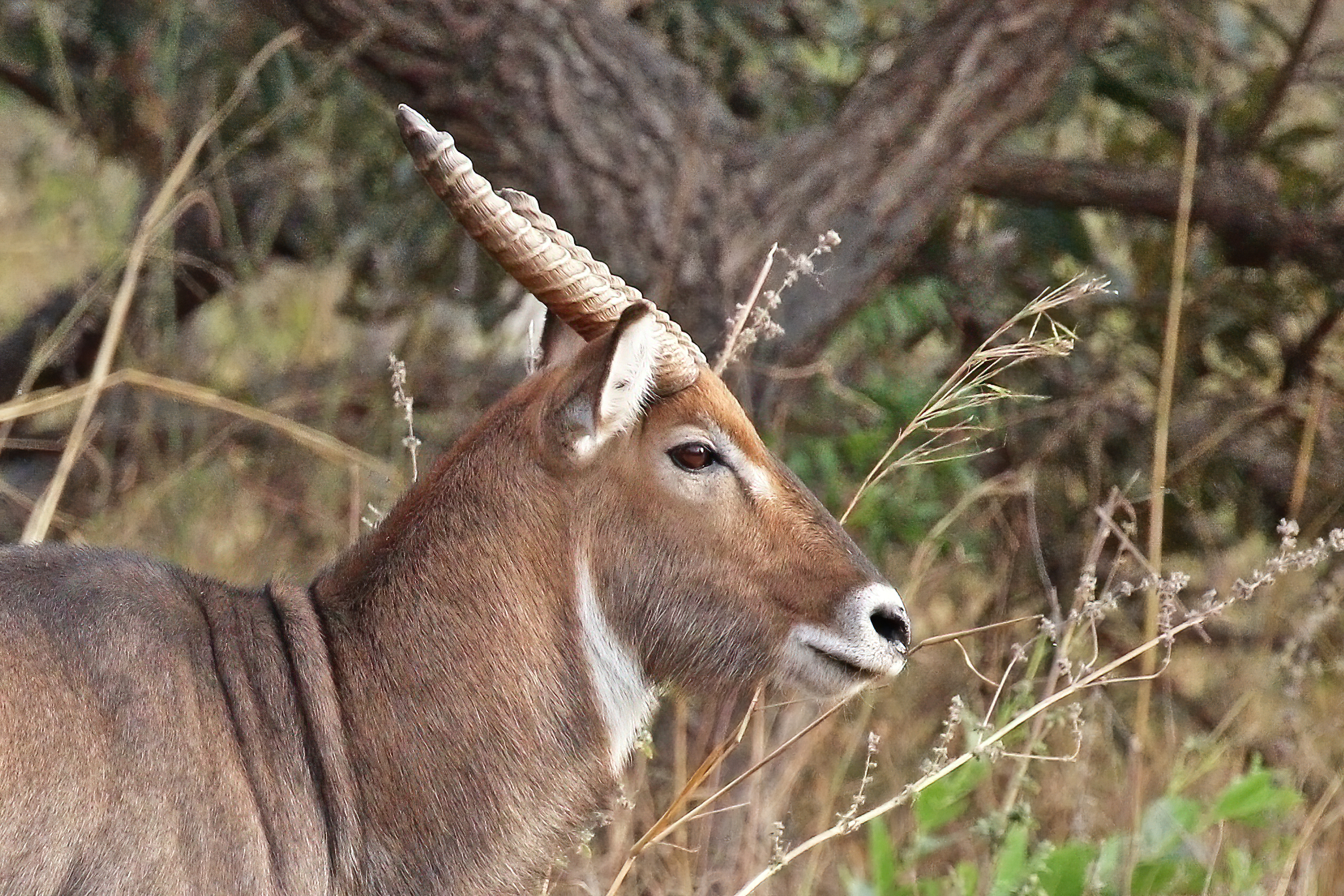
Male K. e. unctuosus
Senegal

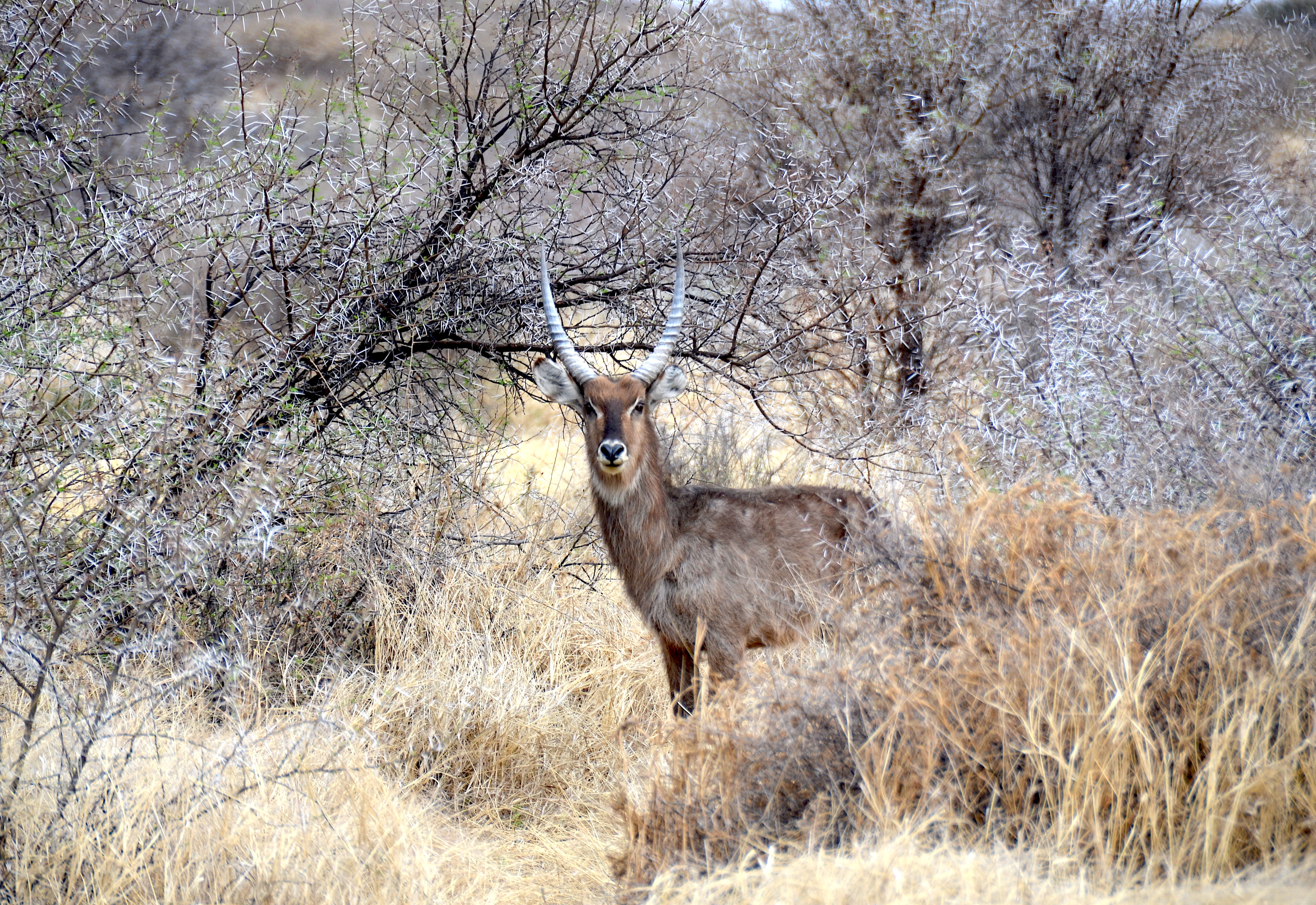
Male K. e. ellipsiprymnus
Namibia

== Description ==
The waterbuck is the largest amongst the six species of Kobus. It is a sexually dimorphic antelope, with the males nearly 7% taller than females and around 8% longer. The head-and-body length is typically 177–235 cm (70–93 in) and the typical height is 120–136 cm (47–54 in). Males reach approximately 127 cm (50 in) at the shoulder, while females reach 119 cm (47 in). The waterbuck is one of the heaviest antelopes. A newborn typically weighs 13.6 kg (30 lb), and growth in weight is faster in males than in females. Males typically weigh 198–262 kg (437–578 lb) and females 161–214 kg (355–472 lb). The tail is 22–45 cm (8.7–17.7 in) long.

The waterbuck has a robust build. The shaggy coat is reddish brown to grey, and becomes progressively darker with age. Males are darker than females. Though apparently thick, the hair is sparse on the coat. The hair on the neck is, however, long and shaggy. When sexually excited, the skin of the waterbuck secretes a greasy substance with the odour of musk (sebum), giving it the name "greasy kob". The odor of this is so unpleasant that it repels predators. This secretion also assists in water-proofing the body when the animal dives into water. The facial features include a white muzzle and light eyebrows and lighter insides of the ears. A cream-coloured patch (called "bib") is on the throat. Waterbuck are characterised by a long neck and short, strong, black legs. Females have two nipples. Preorbital glands, foot glands, and inguinal glands are absent.

The common waterbuck and the defassa waterbuck are remarkably different in their physical appearances. Measurements indicate greater tail length in the latter, whereas the common waterbuck stands taller than the defassa waterbuck. However, the principal differentiation between the two types is the white ring of hair surrounding the tail on the rump, which is a hollow circle in the common waterbuck, but covered with white hair in the defassa waterbuck.

The long, spiral horns curve backward, then forward. Found only on males, the horns range from 55 to 99 cm (22 to 39 in) in length. To some extent, the length of the horns is related to the bull's age. A rudimentary horn in the form of a bone lump may be found on the skulls of females.

== Ecology and behaviour ==
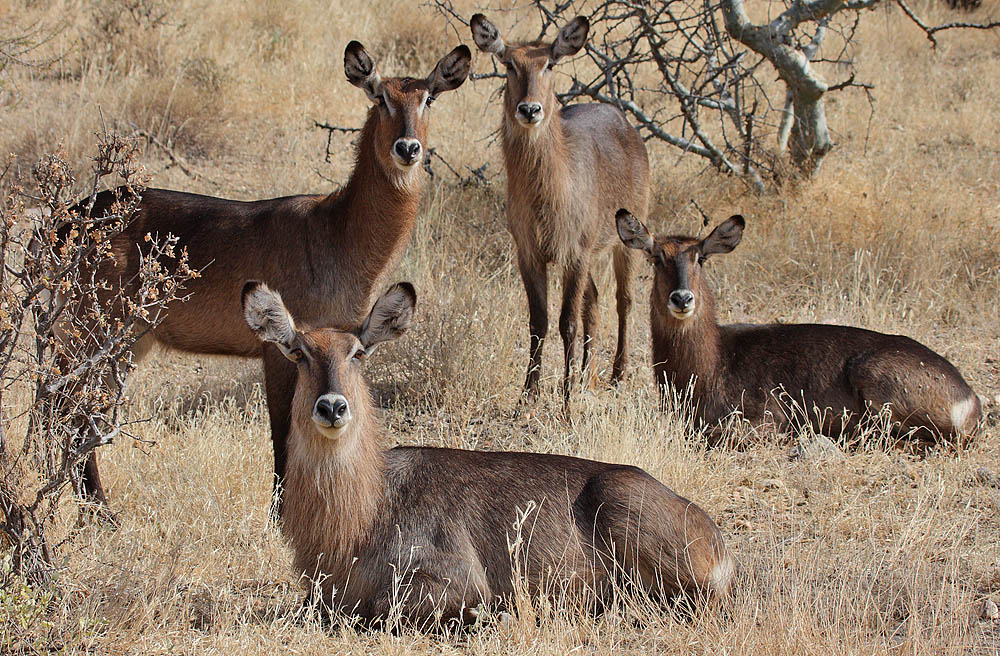
A female herd in the Samburu National Park (Kenya)

Waterbuck are rather sedentary in nature, though some migration may occur with the onset of monsoon. A gregarious animal, the waterbuck may form herds consisting of six to 30 individuals. The various groups are the nursery herds, bachelor herds and territorial males. Herd size increases in summer, whereas groups fragment in the winter months, probably under the influence of food availability. As soon as young males start developing horns (at around seven to nine months of age), they are chased out of the herd by territorial bulls. These males then form bachelor herds and may roam in female home ranges. Females have home ranges stretching over 200–600 hectares (0.77–2.32 sq mi; 490–1,480 acres). A few females may form spinster herds. Though females are seldom aggressive, minor tension may arise in herds.

Males start showing territorial behaviour from the age of 5 years, but are most dominant from 6 to 9 years. Territorial males hold territories 4–146 hectares (0.015–0.564 sq mi; 9.9–360.8 acres) in size. Males are inclined to remain settled in their territories, though over time they may leave inferior territories for more spacious ones. Marking of territories includes no elaborate rituals; dung and urine are occasionally dropped. After the age of ten years, males lose their territorial nature and are replaced by a younger bull, following which they recede to a small and unprotected area. There is another social group, that of the satellite males, which are mature bulls as yet without their own territories, who exploit resources, particularly mating opportunities, even in the presence of the dominant bull. The territorial male may allow a few satellite males into his territory, and they may contribute to its defence. However, gradually they may deprive the actual owner of his territory and seize the area for themselves. In a study in the Lake Nakuru National Park, only 7 percent of the adult males held territories, and only half of the territorial males tolerated one or more satellite males.

Territorial males may use several kinds of display. In one type of display, the white patch on the throat and between the eyes is clearly revealed, and other displays can demonstrate the thickness of the neck. These activities frighten trespassers. Lowering of the head and the body depict submission before the territorial male, who stands erect. Fights, which may last up to thirty minutes, involve threat displays typical of bovids accompanied by snorting. Fights may even become so violent that one of the opponents meets its death due to severe abdominal or thoracic wounds. A silent animal, the waterbuck makes use of flehmen response for visual communication and alarm snorts for vocal communication. Waterbuck often enter water to escape from predators which include lions, spotted hyenas, leopards, cheetahs, African wild dogs and Nile crocodiles (leopards and hyenas prey on juveniles). However, it has been observed that the waterbuck does not particularly like being in water. Waterbuck may run into cover when alarmed, and males often attack predators.

=== Diseases and parasites ===
Waterbucks are susceptible to ulcers, lungworm infections, and kidney stones. Other diseases from which these animals suffer are foot-and-mouth disease, sindbis fever, yellow fever, bluetongue, bovine virus diarrhoea, brucellosis, and anthrax. They are more resistant to rinderpest than are other antelopes. They are unaffected by tsetse flies because they produce volatiles which act as repellents. Waterbuck odor volatiles are under testing and development as repellents to protect livestock. However ticks may introduce parasitic protozoa such as Theileria parva, Anaplasma marginale, and Baberia bigemina; 27 species of ixodid ticks have been found on waterbucks - a healthy waterbuck may carry over 4000 ticks in their larval or nymphal stages, the most common among them being Amblyomma cohaerens and Rhipicephalus tricuspis. Internal parasites found in waterbuck include tapeworms, liver flukes, stomach flukes, and several helminths.

== Diet ==
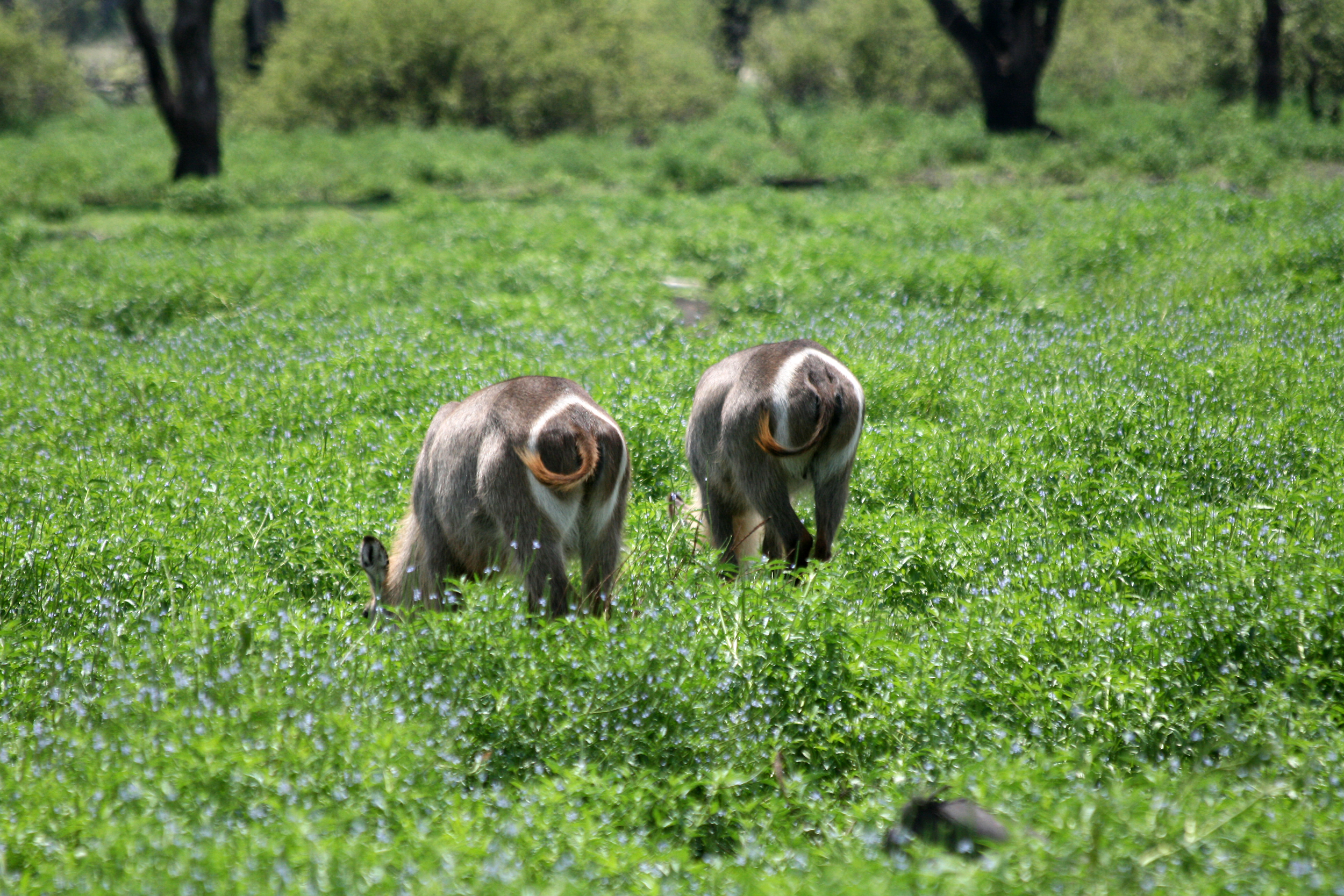
The waterbuck is predominantly a grazer.

The waterbuck exhibits great dependence on water. It can not tolerate dehydration in hot weather, and thus inhabits areas close to sources of water. However, it has been observed that unlike the other members of its genus (such as the kob and puku), the waterbuck ranges farther into the woodlands while maintaining its proximity to water. With grasses constituting a substantial 70 to 95 percent of the diet, the waterbuck is predominantly a grazer frequenting grasslands. Reeds and rushes like Typha and Phragmites may also be preferred. A study found regular consumption of three grass species round the year: Panicum anabaptistum, Echinochloa stagnina and Andropogon gayanus. Hyparrhenia involucrata, Acroceras amplectens and Oryza barthii along with annual species were the main preference in the early rainy season, while long life grasses and forage from trees constituted three-fourths of the diet in the dry season.

Though the defassa waterbuck was found to have a much greater requirement for protein than the African buffalo and the Beisa oryx, the waterbuck was found to spend much less time on browsing (eating leaves, small shoots, and fruits) in comparison to the other grazers. In the dry season, about 32% of the 24-hour day was spent in browsing, whereas no time was spent on it during the wet season. The choice of grasses varies with location rather than availability; for instance, in western Uganda, while Sporobolus pyramidalis was favoured in some places, Themeda triandra was the main choice elsewhere. The common waterbuck and the defassa waterbuck in the same area may differ in their choices; while the former preferred Heteropogon contortus and Cynodon dactylon, the latter showed less preference for these grasses.

== Reproduction ==
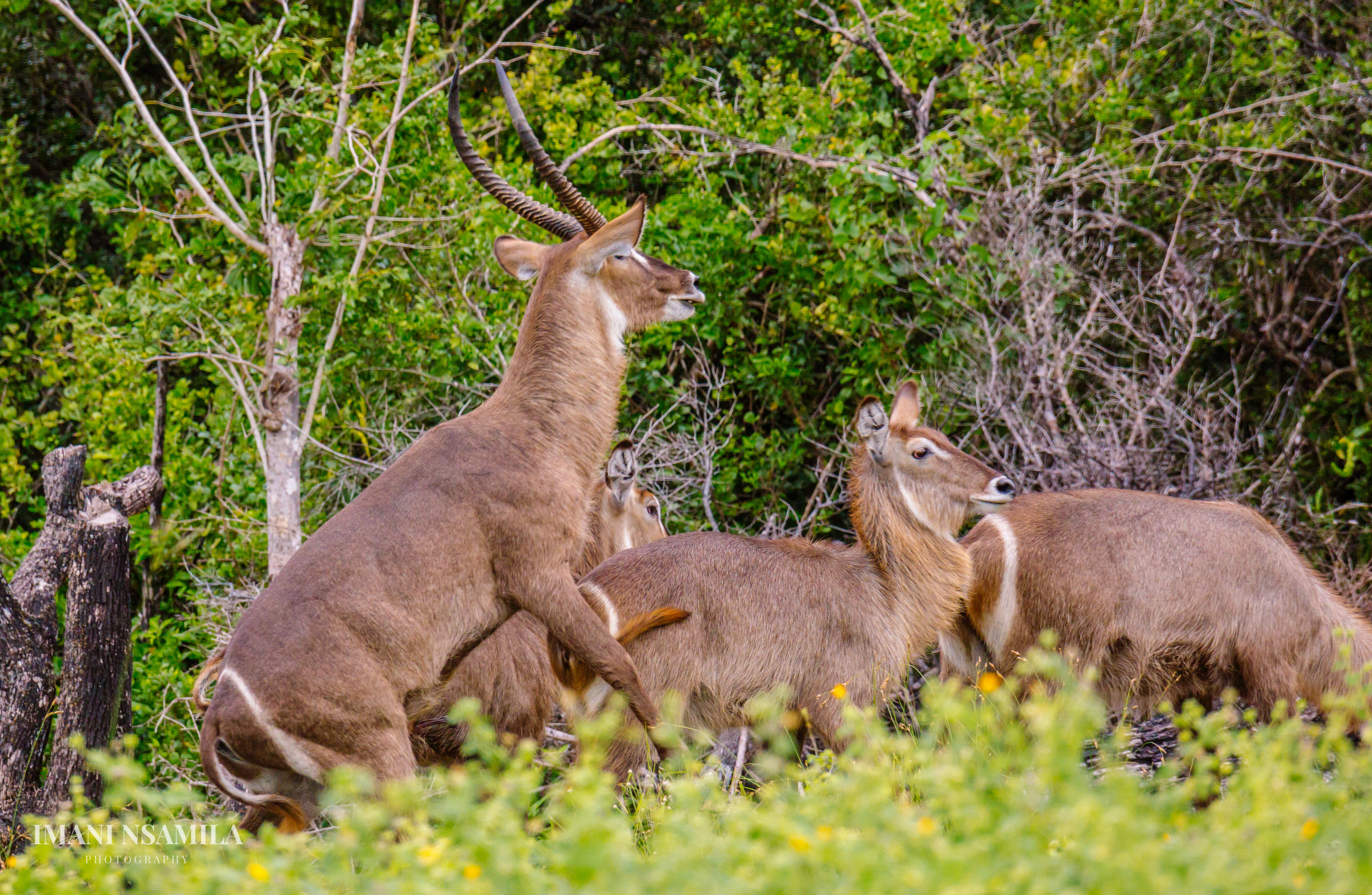
A male waterbuck mounting a female

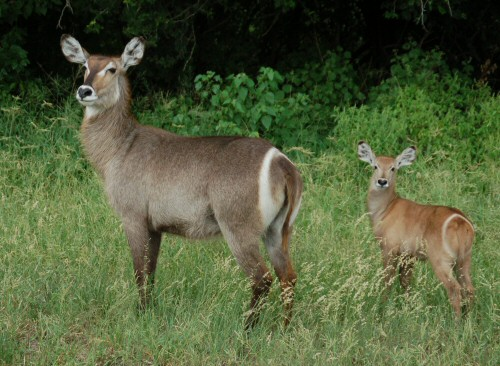
A female waterbuck with her young

Waterbuck are slower than other antelopes in terms of the rate of maturity. While males become sexually mature at the age of six years, females reach maturity within two to three years. Females may conceive by the age of two-and-a-half years, and remain reproductive for another ten years. In equatorial regions, breeding takes place throughout the year, and births are at their peak in the rainy season. However, breeding is seasonal in the Sudan (south of Sahara), with the mating season lasting four months. The season extends for even longer periods in some areas of southern Africa. Oestrus lasts for a day or less.

Mating begins after the male confirms that the female is in oestrus, which he does by sniffing her vulva and urine. A resistive female would try to bite or even fight off an advancing male. The male exhibits flehmen, and often licks the neck of the female and rubs his face and the base of his horns against her back. There are several attempts at mounting before the actual copulation. The female shifts her tail to one side, while the male clasps her sides with his forelegs and rests on her back during copulation, which may occur as many as ten times.

The gestational period lasts for seven to eight months, followed by the birth of a single calf. Twins are rare. Pregnant females isolate themselves in thickets as parturition approaches. Newborn calves can stand on their feet within a half-hour of birth. The mother eats the afterbirth. She communicates with the calf by bleating or snorting. Calves are kept hidden from two to three weeks up to two months. At about three to four weeks, the calf begins following its mother, who signals it to do so by raising her tail. Though bereft of horns, mothers will fiercely defend their offspring from predators. Calves are weaned at eight months, following which time they join groups of calves of their own age. Young females remain with their mothers in nursery herds, or may also join bachelor herds. The waterbuck lives to 18 years in the wild and 30 years in captivity.

== Distribution and habitat ==
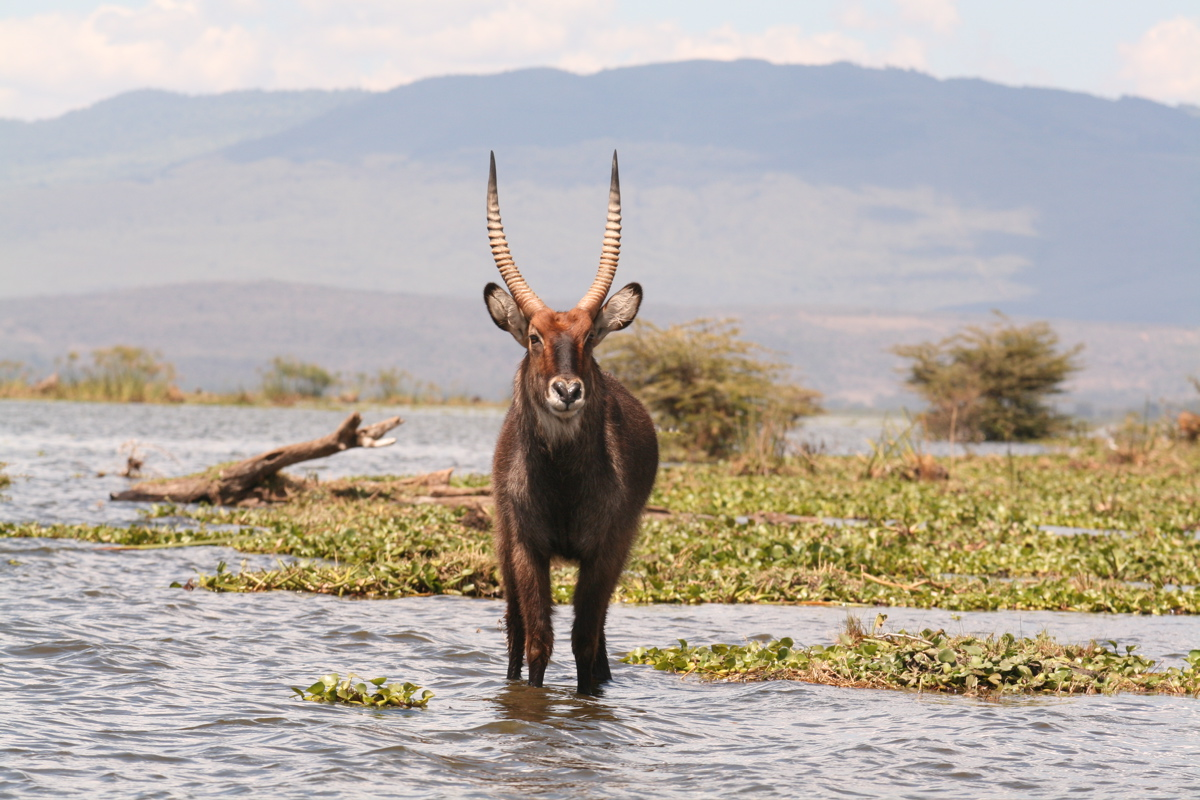
Waterbuck inhabit grasslands close to water.

The waterbuck is native to southern and eastern Africa (including countries such as Angola, Botswana, The Democratic Republic of Congo, Ethiopia, Kenya, Namibia, South Africa, Tanzania and Uganda) besides a few countries of western and northern Africa such as Chad, Côte d'Ivoire, Ghana, Mali, Niger, Nigeria and Senegal. Though formerly widespread in sub-Saharan Africa, its numbers have now decreased in most areas.

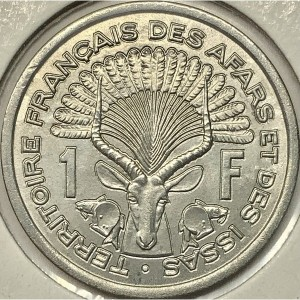
The waterbuck appeared on the coins of the French Territory of the Afars and the Issas.

The common waterbuck is found east of the Eastern African Rift. Its southern range extends to the Hluhluwe-Umfolozi Game Reserve (KwaZulu Natal) and to central Namibia. By contrast, the defassa waterbuck inhabits western and central Africa. The defassa waterbuck occurs west of the Albertine Rift and ranges from Eritrea to Guinea Bissau in the southern Sahel, its most northerly point of distribution being in southern Mali. Its range also stretches east of the Congo Basin through Zambia into Angola, while another branch extends to the Zaire River west of the Congo Basin. While the common waterbuck is now extinct in Ethiopia, the defassa waterbuck has become extinct in Gambia.

Waterbuck inhabit scrub and savanna areas alongside rivers, lakes and valleys. Due to their requirement for grasslands as well as water, the waterbuck have a sparse distribution across ecotones (areas of interface between two different ecosystems). A study in the Ruwenzori Range showed that the mean density of waterbuck was 5.5 per square mile, and estimates in the Maasai Mara were as low as 1.3 per square mile. It has been observed that territorial size depends on the quality of the habitat, the age and health of the animal and the population density. The greater the age of the animal or the denser the populations, the smaller are the territories. In Queen Elizabeth National Park, females had home ranges 21–61 hectares (0.081–0.236 sq mi; 52–151 acres) in area whereas home ranges for bachelor males averaged between 24–38 hectares (0.093–0.147 sq mi; 59–94 acres). The oldest female (around 18 years old) had the smallest home range.

== Threats and conservation ==
The International Union for the Conservation of Nature and Natural Resources (IUCN) lists the waterbuck as of least concern (LC). More specifically, the common waterbuck is listed as of Least Concern while the defassa waterbuck is near threatened (NT). The population trend for both the common and defassa waterbuck is decreasing, especially that of the latter, with large populations being eliminated from their habitats due to poaching and human settlement. Their own sedentary nature too is responsible for this to some extent. Numbers have fallen in Queen Elizabeth National Park, Murchison Falls National Park, Akagera National Park, Lake Nakuru National Park, and Comoé National Park. Population decrease in the Lake Nakuru National Park has been attributed to heavy metal poisoning. While cadmium and lead levels were dangerously high in the kidney and the liver, deficiencies of copper, calcium and phosphorus were noted.

Over 60 percent of the defassa waterbuck populations thrive in protected areas, most notably in Niokolo-Koba, Comoe, Mole, Gorongosa National Park, Bui, Pendjari, Manovo-Gounda St. Floris, Moukalaba-Doudou, Garamba, Virunga, Omo, Mago, Murchison Falls, Serengeti, and Katavi, Kafue and Queen Elizabeth National Parks, the national parks and hunting zones of North Province (Cameroon), Ugalla River Forest Reserve, Nazinga Game Ranch, Rukwa Valley, Awash Valley, Murule and Arly-Singou. The common waterbuck occurs in Tsavo, Tarangire, Mikumi, Kruger and Lake Nakuru National Parks, Laikipia, Kajiado, Luangwa Valley, Selous and Hluhluwe-Umfolozi game reserves and private lands in South Africa.

== Research ==
Scientists with the ICIPE have developed tsetse-fly-repellant collars for cattle based on the smell of the waterbuck.
