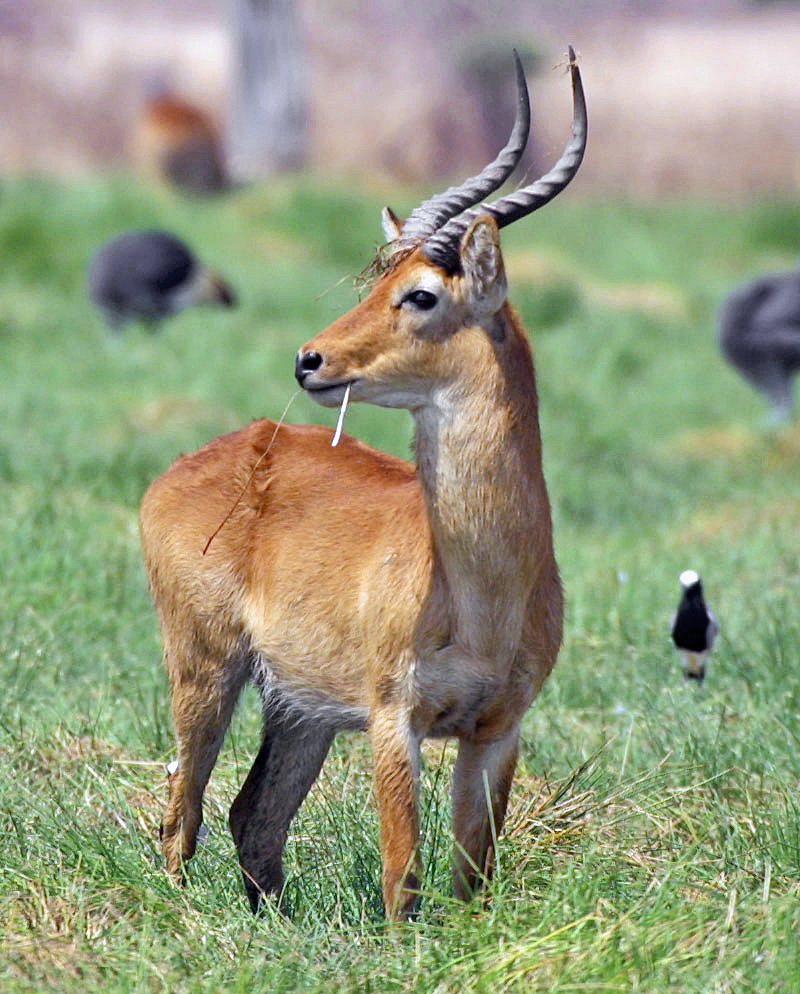
- A male puku (K. vardonii)

Scientific classification
- Kingdom: Animalia
- Phylum: Chordata
- Class: Mammalia
- Order: Artiodactyla
- Family: Bovidae
- Subfamily: Reduncinae
- Genus: Kobus; Smith, 1840

Type species
- Antilope ellipsiprymnus Ogilby, 1833

Species
- Six; see text

= Kobus (antelope) =

Genus of mammals

Kobus is a genus containing six species of African antelopes, all of which are associated with marshes, floodplains, or other grassy areas near water. They are sexually dimorphic, with females being smaller and lacking the horns of the males.

== Species ==
- Genus Kobus

Image	Scientific name	Common name	Distribution
	K. anselli	Upemba lechwe	Upemba wetlands, Democratic Republic of Congo
	K. ellipsiprymnus	Waterbuck	Northern South Africa north to Chad and west to Côte d'Ivoire
	K. kob	Kob	Senegal east to South Sudan and south to Uganda
	K. leche	Lechwe	Botswana, Zambia, Democratic Republic of the Congo, Namibia, Angola
	K. megaceros	Nile lechwe	South Sudan and Ethiopia
	K. vardonii	Puku	Southern Democratic Republic of Congo, Namibia, Tanzania, and Zambia
