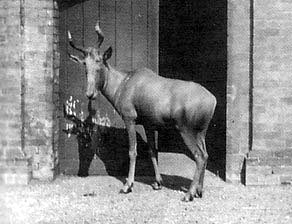
- A female bubal hartebeest that lived in London Zoo from 4 October 1883 until 27 April 1897. Photographed by Lewis Medland in 1895.

Conservation status
- Extinct (1925) (IUCN 3.1)

Scientific classification
- Kingdom: Animalia
- Phylum: Chordata
- Class: Mammalia
- Order: Artiodactyla
- Family: Bovidae
- Subfamily: Alcelaphinae
- Genus: Alcelaphus
- Species: A. buselaphus
- Subspecies: †A. b. buselaphus

Trinomial name
- †Alcelaphus buselaphus buselaphus (Pallas, 1766)
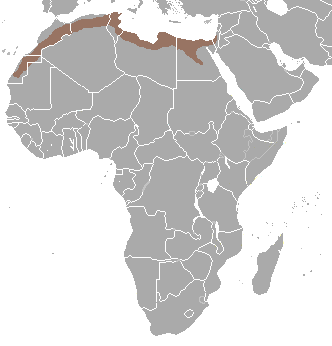
- A. b. buselaphus ranged north of the Sahara, from Morocco to Egypt

= Bubal hartebeest =

Extinct subspecies of African grassland antelope

The bubal hartebeest, also known as northern hartebeest or bubal antelope or simply bubal (Alcelaphus buselaphus buselaphus), is the extinct nominal (i.e., first described) subspecies of hartebeest. It was formerly found north of the Saharan Desert. Other subspecies live currently in grasslands south of the Sahara, from Senegal in the west to Eritrea and Ethiopia in the east and down to central Tanzania. The red hartebeest and Lichtenstein's hartebeest, alternatively considered subspecies or sister species of the common hartebeest, are present in southern Africa.

== Name ==
The ancient name for the bubal hartebeest was bubalus (Latin) or boubalos (Greek), from which the term buffalo is derived. Authors that describe the wild bubali of north Africa include Herodotus, Dio Cassius, Strabo, Polybius, Diodorus Siculus and Oppian.

== Description ==
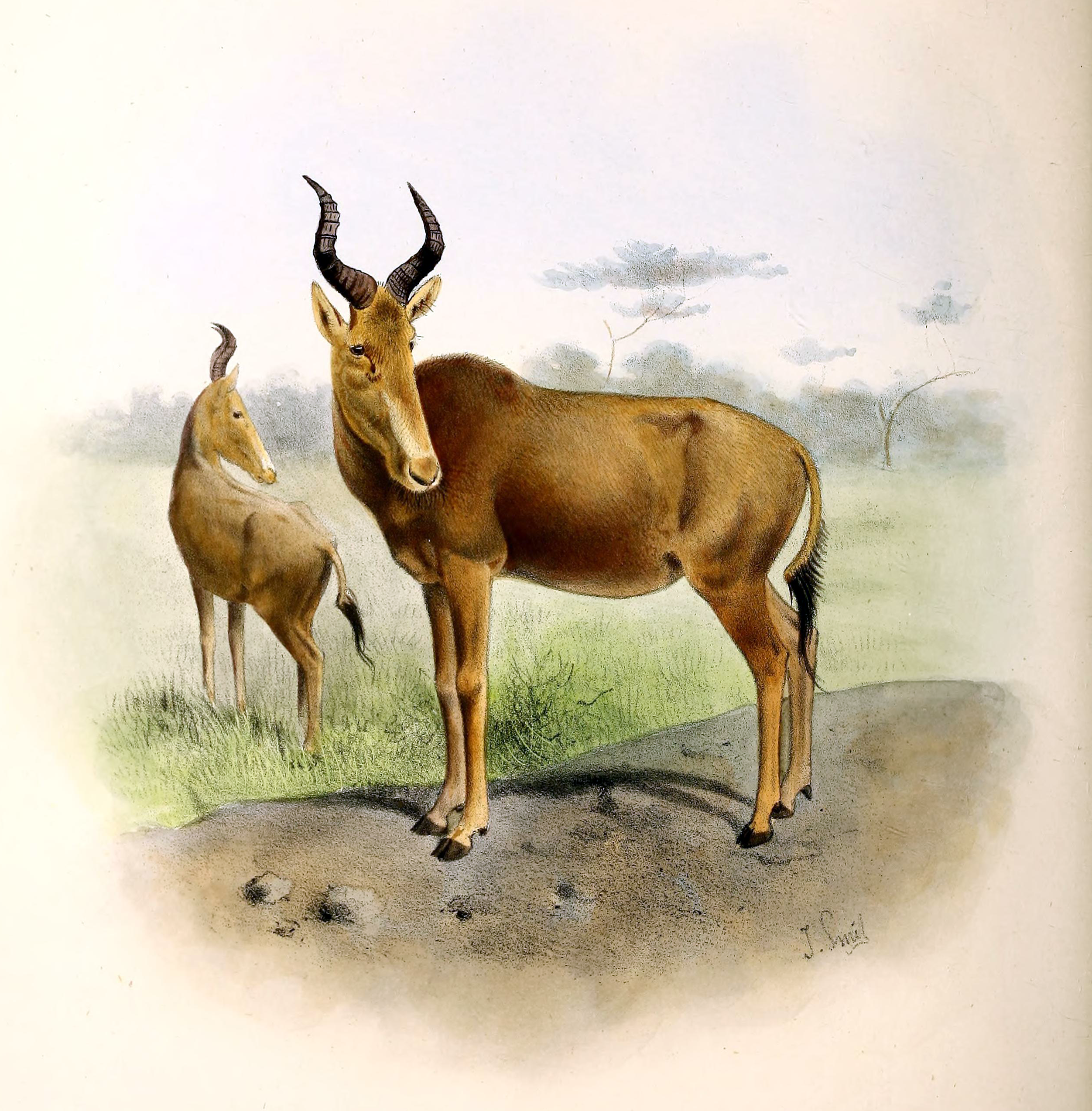
Bubal hartebeest in The Book of Antelopes (1894)

The bubal hartebeest was described as uniformly sand colored, save for "an ill-defined patch of greyish on each side of the muzzle above the nostrils", and the terminal tuft of the tail, which was black. In this case the subspecies was similar to the plain colored Lelwel hartebeest, lacking white or black facial markings such as those present in the Western and Swayne's hartebeest. It measured 1.1 m (3 ft 7 in) at the shoulder and the horns were U-shaped when seen from the front.

Like other hartebeests, the bubal was a social animal. Luis del Mármol Carvajal wrote in 1573 that herds of 100 to 200 animals could be found in northern Morocco. According to 19th century writers, the bubal hartebeest preferred rocky areas with a fair amount of vegetation, in contrast to the sandy, drier habitat of the addax. Its main predator was the Barbary lion, which is now extinct in the wild.

== History and extinction ==
The bubal hartebeest ranged originally across Africa north of the Sahara, from Morocco to Egypt, where it disappeared earlier. It was also present with certainty in the Southern Levant prior to the Iron Age, but Francis Harper (1945) found only "none too well substantiated" recent historical records from Palestine and Arabia. The northern limit of the bubal hartebeest's range was the Mediterranean coast; large herds were still reported existing in Morocco north of the Atlas Mountains in 1738. As for the southern limits of its distribution, "wild oxen (Antilope bubalis)" were mentioned living in the Tassili mountains of the central Sahara in 1850. However, the identity of the latter animals is debatable. Even if they were indeed hartebeest, they might not belong to the northern subspecies.

The subspecies declined sharply during the course of the 19th century, especially after the French conquest of Algeria, when entire herds were massacred at once by the colonial military. By 1867 it could only be found in the mountain ranges of north-western Africa that are near or within the Saharian desert. It disappeared from the Tunisian Atlas in 1870, and the last animal in this country was shot in 1902 near Tataouine. Outside of this instance, the bubal seems to have entered the 20th century restricted to the Western Atlas, from Boulemane in Morocco to the south of the Wahran department in Algeria. The last known herd, numbering only 15 animals, was located near Outat El Haj, Morocco in 1917; all but 3 of them were killed by the same hunter. The last animal in Morocco was shot in Missour in 1925. It probably disappeared around the same time in Algeria. One last specimen is mentioned as having been collected in the 1920s near Geryville, south of the Chott Ech Chergui. While Harper, writing in 1945, considered that the subspecies could still possibly exist at the time in this area, he also mentioned that different campaigns in the 1920s and 1930s failed to find any animals in Morocco, Algeria or Tunisia, even in regions where it had been reported as numerous only a few decades before.

The bubal hartebeest was protected under the London Convention of 1933.

== Zoo and museum specimens ==
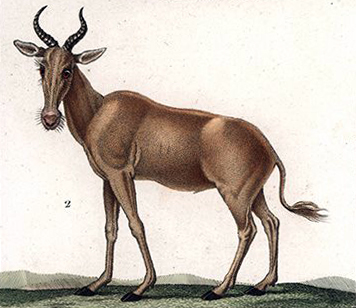
1837 illustration

Individuals of bubal hartebeest were sometimes captured and kept in British, French, Italian and German private and public zoos around the start of the 20th century, although Ruxton and Schwarz (1929) failed to find any preserved in museums of these countries. The last captive bubal, a female (sometimes wrongly reported as the last bubal ever), died in Paris in 1923. The Academy of Natural Sciences of Philadelphia received another female in 1905 from the Zoological Society of Philadelphia, which was stuffed. This is possibly the only bubal preserved in the United States of America.

== Relation with ancient civilizations ==
Remains of bubal hartebeests have been found in several Egyptian archaeological sites such as Abadiyeh, Saqqara and Karanis, the last one dating to the early Middle Ages. A hieroglyph meaning "baby hartebeest" also existed:

E9

For these reasons, it has been suggested that the bubal was domesticated in Ancient Egypt, or at least used as a sacrificial animal. It is also mentioned in the Old Testament under the name of Yachmur (1 Kings 4:23) It is a likely candidate for the unidentified "the'o" in Deuteronomy, described as a kosher animal.

The bubal hartebeest is one of many extinct animals depicted in the Roman mosaics of Hippo Regius (modern Algeria) that date back to the 2nd and 4th centuries AD.
