= Dikhololo Game Reserve =

Wildlife reserve in North West Province, South Africa

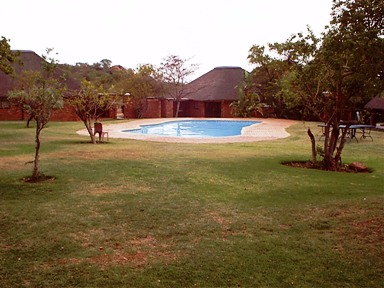
- Kudu camp in Dikhololo

- Location within North West (South African province) Location within South Africa
- Location: North West, South Africa
- Coordinates: 25°25′7″S 27°44′34″E
- Governing body: Dikhololo Shareblock Company
- Website: www.dikhololo.co.za

Dikhololo is a wildlife reserve located in South Africa's North West Province, approximately 35 kilometers (22 miles) outside of Brits. Originally established as a cattle farm in 1922, it was officially opened as a resort in 1983. It is a game farm and family-friendly resort, offering a bush experience, it houses a variety of wildlife and diverse bird species.

Visitors can have a close encounter with giraffes, a variety of antelope, zebras, jackals, hundreds of bird species, etc. It features a variety of amenities and entertainment programs.

The public resort offers chalet lodging grouped into camps throughout the reserve, nestled amidst low hills.

Visitors to Dikhololo observe a diverse range of wildlife species, including Burchell's zebra, giraffe, common duiker, steenbok, blesbok, impala, blue wildebeest, red hartebeest, waterbuck, nyala, kudu, eland, and others. Dikholo is the native name for the "klipspringer", but this species is no more to be found on the resort.

Whilst offering recreational amenities such as swimming pools, water slides, flood-lit tennis courts, golf courses, quad biking, and guided game drives, the resort also attracts regular visitors from nearby urban centers such as Pretoria and Johannesburg, as well as from surrounding areas.
