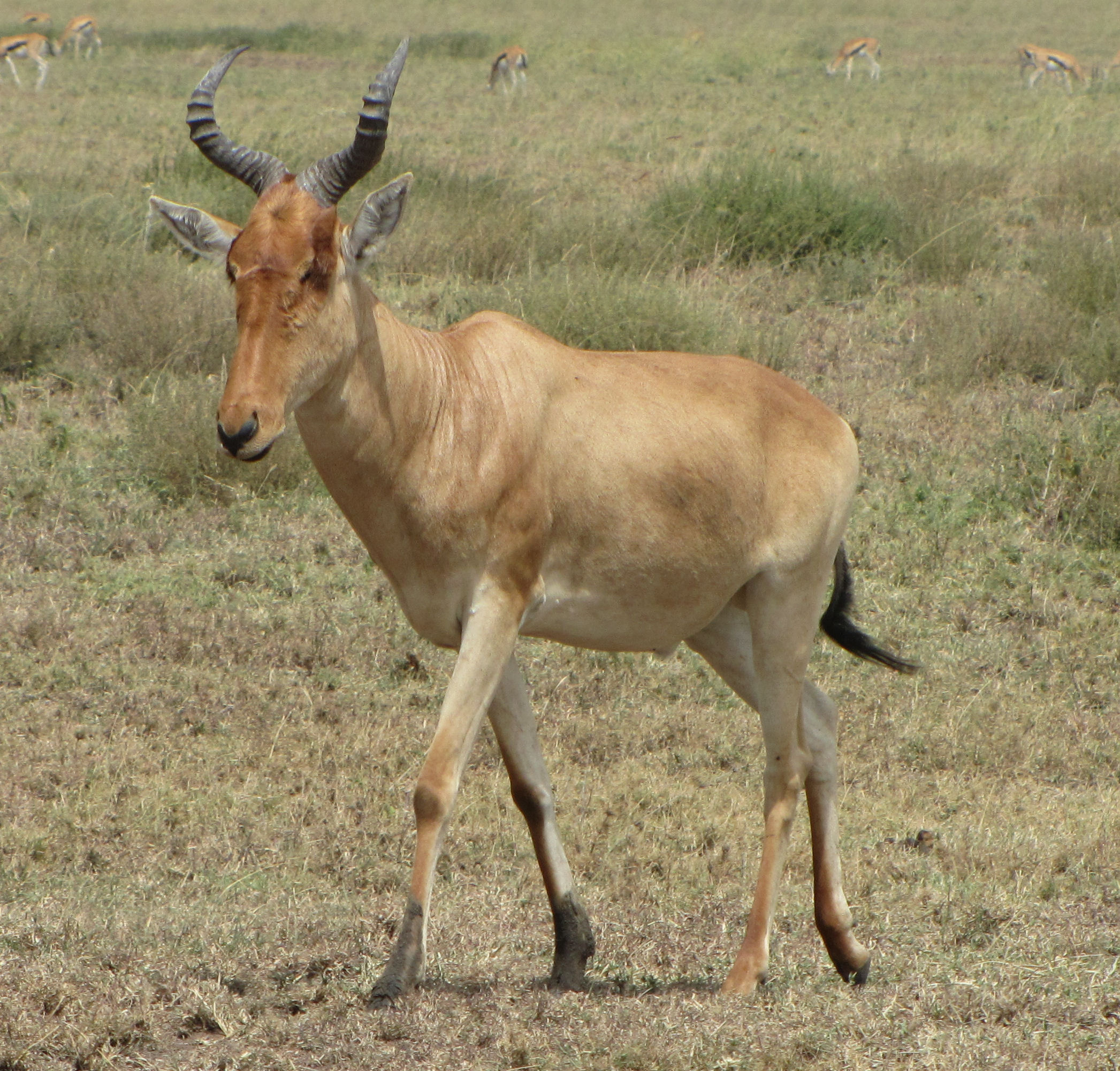
- Coke's hartebeest in the Serengeti National Park, Tanzania

Conservation status
- Least Concern (IUCN 3.1)

Scientific classification
- Kingdom: Animalia
- Phylum: Chordata
- Class: Mammalia
- Infraclass: Placentalia
- Order: Artiodactyla
- Family: Bovidae
- Subfamily: Alcelaphinae
- Genus: Alcelaphus; Blainville, 1816
- Species: A. buselaphus

Binomial name
- Alcelaphus buselaphus (Pallas, 1766)

Subspecies
- List: * † A. b. buselaphus (Pallas, 1766); * A. b. cokii Günther, 1884; * A. b. lelwel (Heuglin, 1877); * A. b. major (Blyth, 1869); * A. b. swaynei (P. L. Sclater, 1892); * A. b. tora Gray, 1873; * A. b. caama (Saint-Hilaire, 1803); * A. b. lichtensteinii (Peters, 1849)
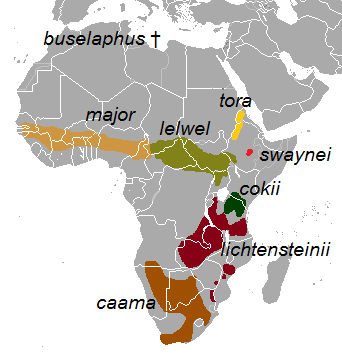
- Distribution of the subspecies

Synonyms
- Antilope bubalis Pallas, 1767; Antilope buselaphus Pallas, 1766; Bubalis buselaphus (Pallas, 1766)

= Hartebeest =

Grassland antelope

The hartebeest (/ˈhɑːrtəˌbiːst/; Alcelaphus buselaphus), also known as kongoni or kaama, is an African antelope. It is the only member of the genus Alcelaphus. Eight subspecies have been described, including two sometimes considered to be independent species. A large antelope, the hartebeest stands just over 1 m (3 ft 3 in) at the shoulder, and has a typical head-and-body length of 2 to 2.50 m (6 ft 7 in to 8 ft 2 in). The weight ranges from 100 to 200 kg (220 to 440 lb). It has a particularly elongated forehead and oddly-shaped horns, a short neck, and pointed ears. Its legs, which often have black markings, are unusually long. The coat is generally short and shiny. Coat colour varies by the subspecies, from the sandy brown of the western hartebeest to the chocolate brown of the Swayne's hartebeest. Both sexes of all subspecies have horns, with those of females being slenderer. Horns can reach lengths of 45–70 cm (18–28 in). Apart from its long face, the large chest and the sharply sloping back differentiate the hartebeest from other antelopes. A conspicuous hump over the shoulders is due to the long dorsal processes of the vertebrae in this region.

Gregarious animals, hartebeest form herds of 20 to 300 individuals. They are very alert and non-aggressive. They are primarily grazers, with their diets consisting mainly of grasses. Mating in hartebeest takes place throughout the year with one or two peaks, and depends upon the subspecies and local factors. Both males and females reach sexual maturity at one to two years of age. Gestation is eight to nine months long, after which a single calf is born. Births usually peak in the dry season. The lifespan is 12 to 15 years.

Inhabiting dry savannas and wooded grasslands, hartebeest often move to more arid places after rainfall. They have been reported from altitudes on Mount Kenya up to 4,000 m (13,000 ft). The hartebeest was formerly widespread in Africa, but populations have undergone a drastic decline due to habitat destruction, hunting, human settlement, and competition with livestock for food. Each of the eight subspecies of the hartebeest has a different conservation status. The Bubal hartebeest was declared extinct by the International Union for Conservation of Nature (IUCN) in 1994. While the populations of the red hartebeest are on the rise, those of the Tora hartebeest, already Critically Endangered, are falling. The hartebeest is extinct in Algeria, Egypt, Lesotho, Libya, Morocco, Somalia, and Tunisia; but has been introduced into Eswatini and Zimbabwe. It is a popular game animal due to its highly regarded meat.

== Etymology ==
The vernacular name "hartebeest" may have originated from the obsolete Dutch word hertebeest, literally deer beast, based on the resemblance (to early Dutch settlers) of the antelope to deer. The first use of the word "hartebeest" in South African literature was in Dutch colonial administrator Jan van Riebeeck's journal Daghregister in 1660. He wrote: "Meester Pieter ein hart-beest geschooten hadde (Master Pieter [van Meerhoff] had shot one hartebeest)". Another name for the hartebeest is kongoni, a Swahili word. Kongoni is often used to refer in particular to one of its subspecies, Coke's hartebeest.

== Taxonomy ==
The scientific name of the hartebeest is Alcelaphus buselaphus. First described by German zoologist Peter Simon Pallas in 1766, it is classified in the genus Alcelaphus and placed in the family Bovidae. In 1979, palaeontologist Elisabeth Vrba supported Sigmoceros as a separate genus for Lichtenstein's hartebeest, a kind of hartebeest, as she assumed it was related to Connochaetes (wildebeest). She had analysed the skull characters of living and extinct species of antelope to make a cladogram, and argued that a wide skull linked Lichtenstein's hartebeest with Connochaetes. However, this finding was not replicated by Alan W. Gentry of the Natural History Museum, who classified it as an independent species of Alcelaphus. Zoologists such as Jonathan Kingdon and Theodor Haltenorth considered it to be a subspecies of A. buselaphus. Vrba dissolved the new genus in 1997 after reconsideration. An MtDNA analysis could find no evidence to support a separate genus for Lichtenstein's hartebeest. It also showed the tribe Alcelaphini to be monophyletic, and discovered close affinity between the Alcelaphus and the sassabies (genus Damaliscus)—both genetically and morphologically.

=== Subspecies ===
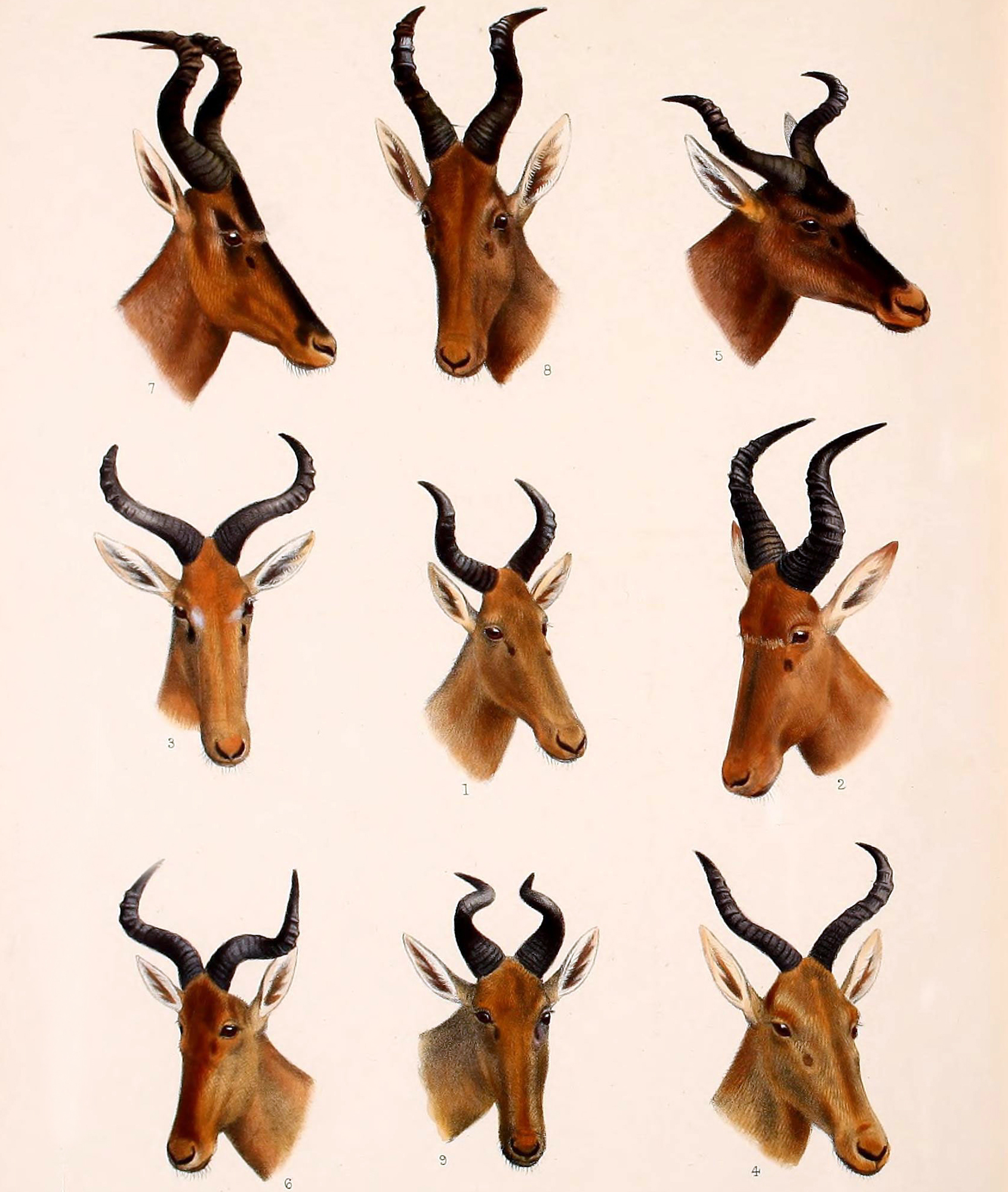
Hartebeest subspecies: bubal hartebeest (centre); (clockwise from top-left corner) red hartebeest, Lelwel hartebeest, Swayne's hartebeest, western hartebeest, Neumann's hartebeest, Lichtenstein's hartebeest, Coke's hartebeest and tora hartebeest, from Great and Small Game of Africa

Eight subspecies are identified, of which two – A. b. caama and A. b. lichtensteinii – have been considered to be independent species. However, a 1999 genetic study by P. Arctander of the University of Copenhagen and colleagues, which sampled the control region of the mitochondrial DNA, found that these two formed a clade within A. buselaphus, and that recognising these as species would render A. buselaphus paraphyletic (an unnatural grouping). The same study found A. b. major to be the most divergent, having branched off before the lineage split to give a combined caama/lichtensteinii lineage and another that gave rise to the remaining extant subspecies. Conversely a 2001 phylogenetic study, based on D–loop and cytochrome b analysis by Øystein Flagstad (of the Norwegian Institute for Nature Research, Trondheim) and colleagues, found that the southern lineage of A. b. caama and A. lichtensteinii diverged earliest. Analysis of skull structure supports partition into three major divisions: A. b. buselaphus division (nominate, also including A. b. major division), A. b. tora division (also including A. b. cokii and A. b. swaynei) and A. b. lelwel division. Another analysis of cytochrome b and D-loop sequence data shows a notable affinity between the A. b. lelwel and A. b. tora divisions.

The eight subspecies, including the two controversial ones, are:

- † A. b. buselaphus (Pallas, 1766) : Known as the bubal hartebeest or northern hartebeest. Formerly occurred across northern Africa, from Morocco to Egypt. It was exterminated by the 1920s. It was declared extinct in 1994 by the International Union for the Conservation of Nature and Natural Resources (IUCN).
- A. b. caama (Saint-Hilaire, 1803) : Known as the red hartebeest or Cape hartebeest. Formerly occurred in southern Angola; northern and eastern savannahs of Namibia; central, southern and southwestern Botswana; Northern Cape, Eastern Cape, Western Cape, Free State, Northwest and Gauteng provinces and western KwaZulu-Natal of South Africa. Presently has been eliminated from all these areas except Northern Cape, central and southwestern Botswana and Namibia. Major re-introductions have taken place in these countries. The population of this hartebeest is on the rise.
- A. b. cokii Günther, 1884: Known as Coke's hartebeest or kongoni. Native to and confined within Kenya and northern Tanzania.
- A. b. lelwel (Heuglin, 1877) : Known as the Lelwel hartebeest. Formerly found in northern and northeastern Democratic Republic of the Congo; southeastern and southwestern Sudan; and the northwestern extreme of Tanzania. Drastic population decrease since the 1980s has confined most individuals to protected areas inside and outside its range.
- A. b. lichtensteinii (Peters, 1849) : Known as Lichtenstein's hartebeest. Inhabits the miombo woodlands of eastern and southern Africa. It is native to Angola, the Democratic Republic of Congo, Malawi, Mozambique, South Africa, Tanzania, Zambia and Zimbabwe.
- A. b. major (Blyth, 1869) : Known as the western hartebeest. Formerly occurred widely in Mali, Niger, Senegal, Gambia, Guinea-Bissau, Guinea, Ivory Coast, Ghana, Nigeria, southwestern Chad, Cameroon, western Central African Republic and Benin. Nowadays it occurs in much lower numbers mainly in protected areas of these countries. It is probably extinct in Gambia.
- A. b. swaynei (Sclater, 1892) : Known as Swayne's hartebeest. Restricted to the southern Rift Valley in Ethiopia, confirmed and listed as an endemic species. It formerly occurred throughout the Rift Valley, and its range extended eastward into northwestern Somalia. It disappeared from Somalia by 1930 due to the outcome of the rinderpest epidemic, illegal poaching, and livestock overgrazing. Confirmed as endangered species, its populations are low with at least 1500 individuals, and on verge of population decline.
- A. b. tora Gray, 1873 : Known as the tora hartebeest. Formerly occurred in northwestern Ethiopia and western and southwestern Eritrea. Its present status is unclear, though locals have reported small numbers from these areas.
Five hartebeest subspecies
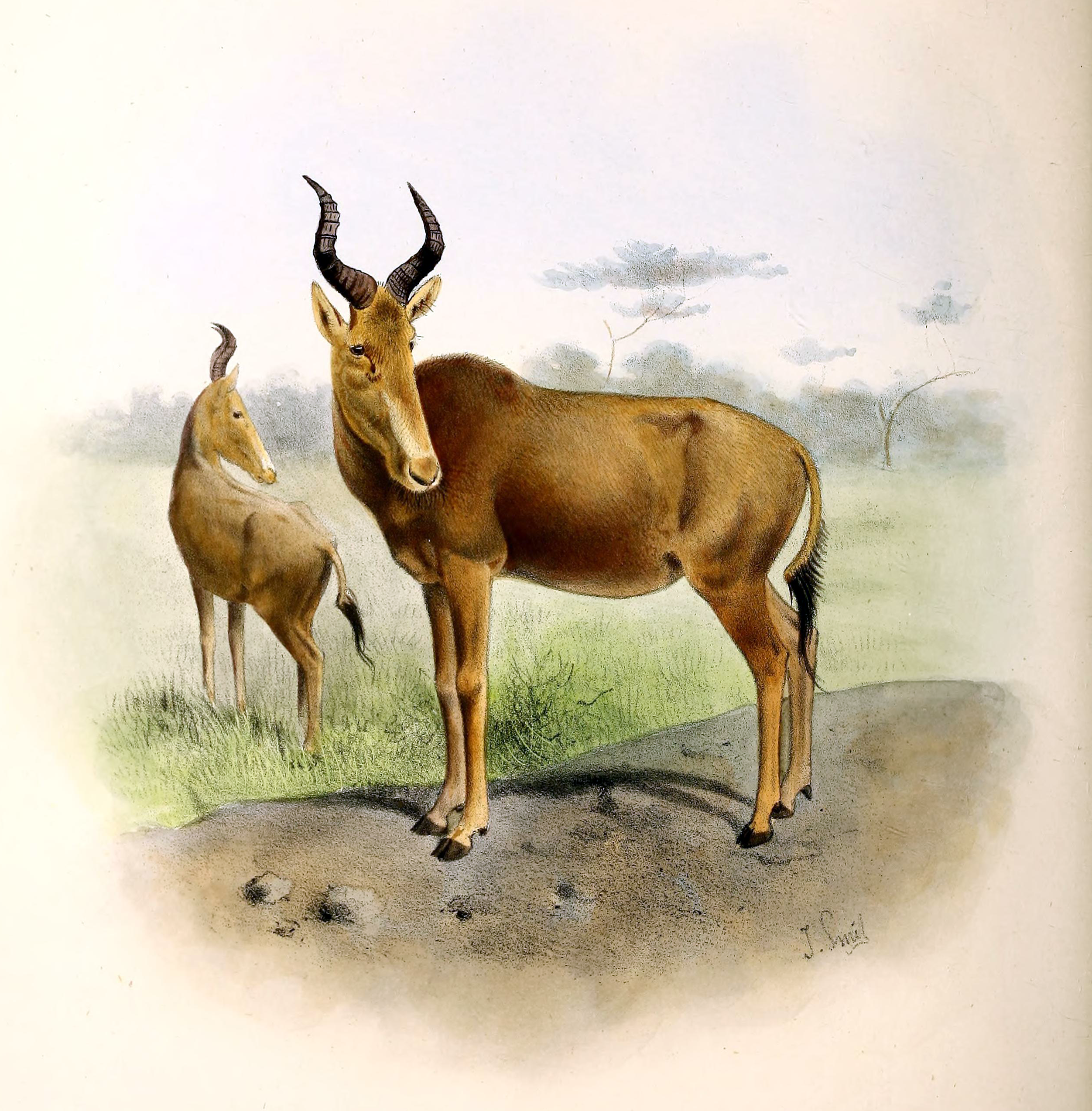
Bubal hartebeest

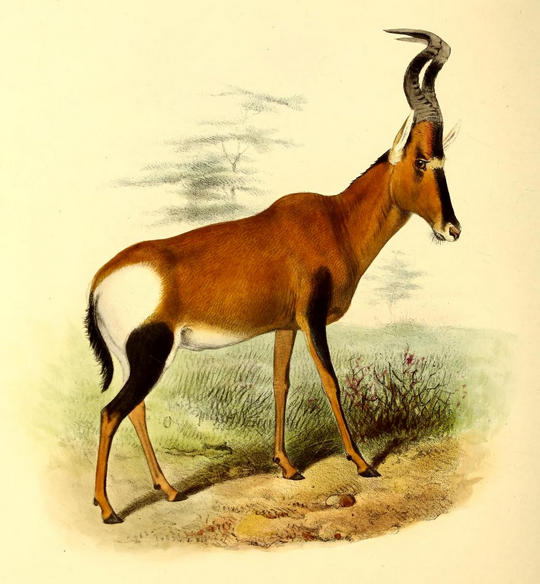
Red hartebeest

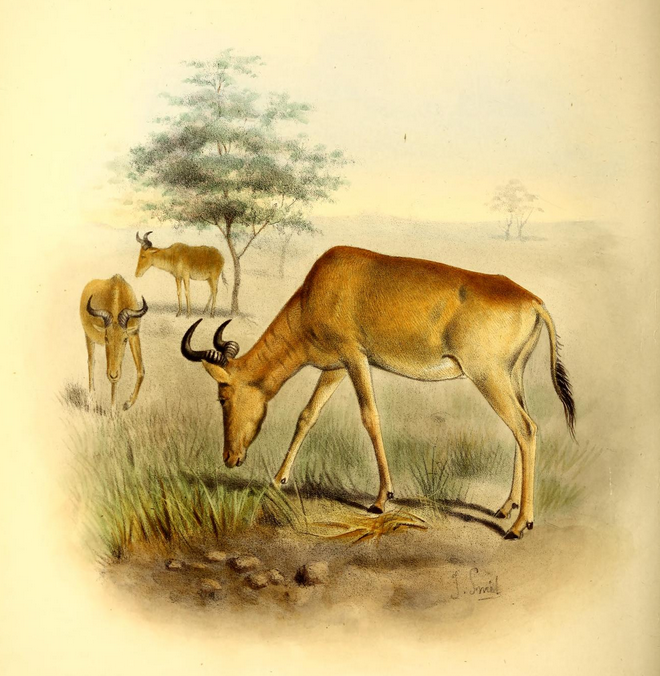
Coke's hartebeest

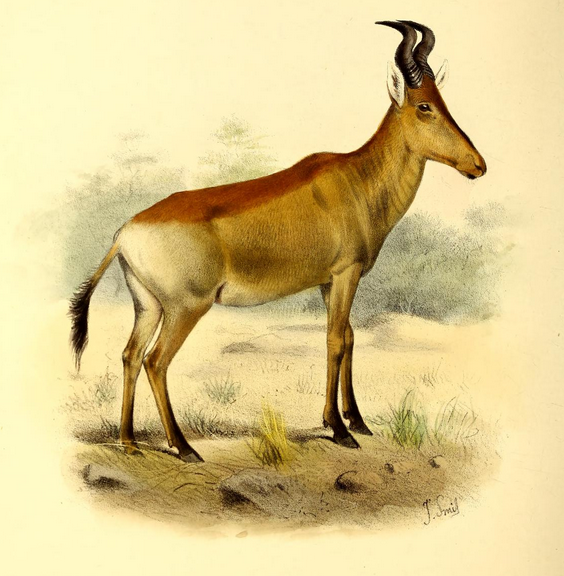
Lichtenstein's hartebeest

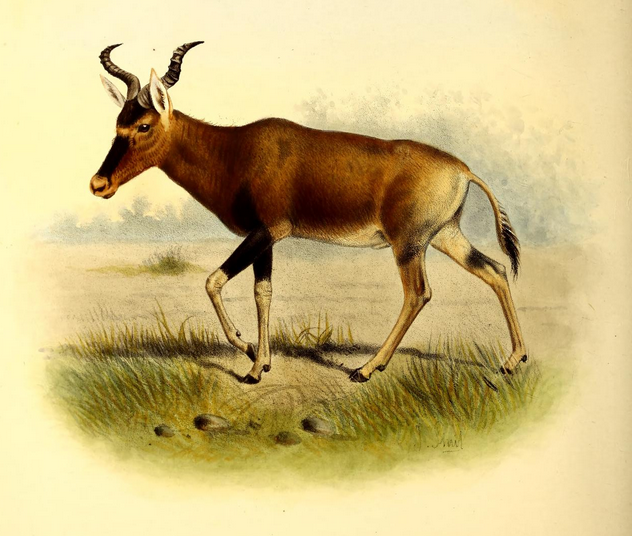
Swayne's hartebeest

=== Genetics and hybrids ===
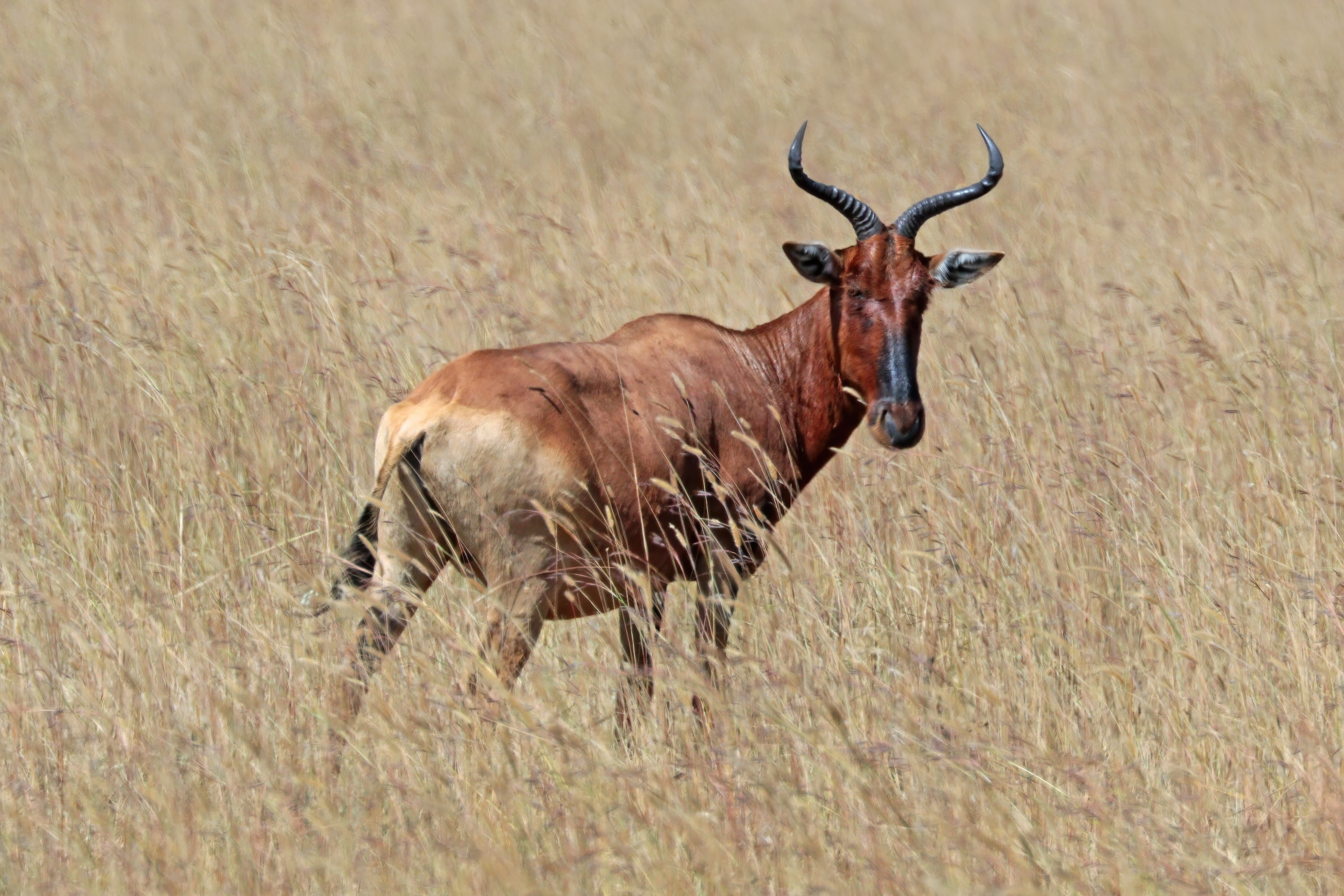
Swayne's hartebeest A. b. swaynei, Senkelle Swayne's Hartebeest Sanctuary, Ethiopia

In 2000, a study scrutinised two major populations of the Swayne's hartebeest, from the Senkele Wildlife Sanctuary and the Nechisar National Park, for mitochondrial (D-loop) and nuclear (microsatellite) variability in an attempt to estimate the levels of genetic variation between the populations and within the subspecies. The results showed a remarkable differentiation between the two populations; that from the Senkele Wildlife Sanctuary showed more genetic diversity than the one from the Nechisar National Park. Another revelation was that the translocation of the individuals from the Senkele Wildlife Sanctuary in 1974 had not made a significant contribution to the gene pool of the Nechisar National Park. Additionally, the Swayne hartebeest populations were compared with a large red hartebeest population, and both subspecies were found to have a high degree of genetic variation. The study advocated in situ conservation of the Swayne's hartebeest and a renewed attempt at its translocation in order to conserve genetic diversity and increase its population in both the protected areas.

The diploid number of chromosomes in the hartebeest is 40. Hybrids are usually reported from areas where ranges of two subspecies overlap. Hybrids between the Lelwel and Tora hartebeest have been reported in eastern Sudan and western Ethiopia, in a stretch southward from the Blue Nile to about 9° N latitude. A study proved a male hybrid of the red hartebeest and the blesbok (Damaliscus pygargus) to be sterile. Sterility of the hybrid was attributed to difficulties in segregation during meiosis, indicated by azoospermia and a low number of germ cells in its seminiferous tubules.

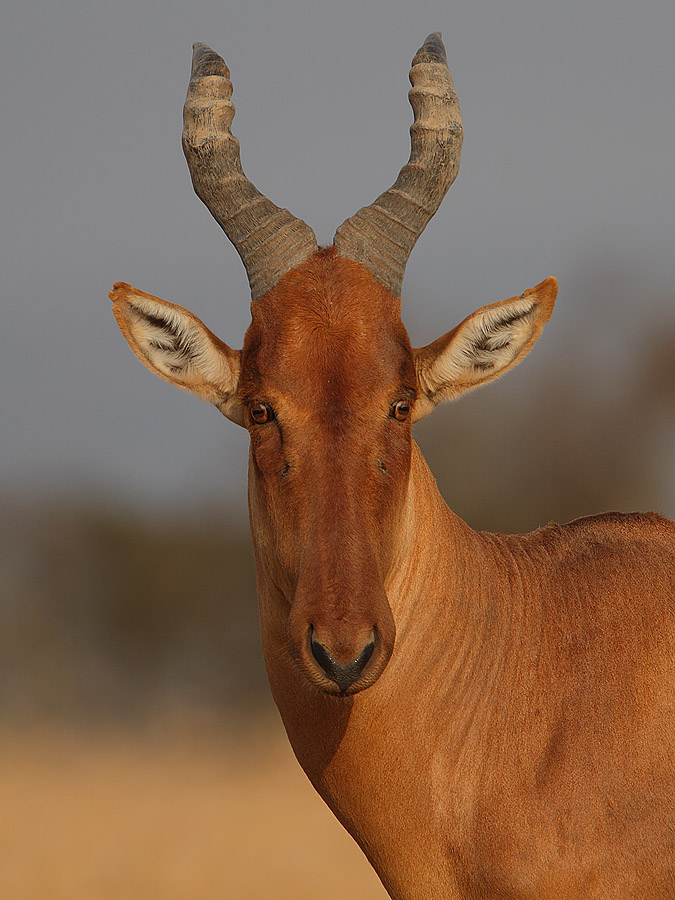
Jackson's hartebeest

There are three well-defined hybrids between the subspecies:

- Alcelaphus lelwel x cokii: Known as the Kenya Highland hartebeest or the Laikipia hartebeest. It is a cross between the Lelwel and Coke's hartebeest. This hybrid is lighter in colour and larger than Coke's hartebeest. It is a light buff with reddish-tawny upper parts, and the head is longer than in Coke's hartebeest. Both sexes have horns, which are heavier as well as longer than those of the parents. It was formerly distributed throughout the western Kenyan highlands, between Lake Victoria and Mount Kenya, but is now believed to be restricted to the Lambwe Valley (south-west Kenya) and Laikipia and nearby regions of west-central Kenya.
- The Jackson's hartebeest does not have a clear taxonomic status. Like the form above, it is regarded as a hybrid between the Lelwel and Coke's hartebeest, and has a similar distribution. The African Antelope Database (1998) treats it as synonymous to the Lelwel hartebeest. From Lake Baringo to Mount Kenya, the Jackson's hartebeest significantly resembles the Lelwel hartebeest, whereas from Lake Victoria to the southern part of the Rift Valley it tends to be more like the Coke's hartebeest.
- Alcelaphus lelwel x swaynei : Also known as the Neumann's hartebeest, named after traveller and hunter Arthur Henry Neumann. This is considered to be a cross between the Lelwel hartebeest and Swayne's hartebeest. The face is longer than that of the Swayne's hartebeest. The colour of the coat is a golden brown, paler towards the underparts. The chin has a hint of black and the tail ends in a black tuft. Both sexes have longer horns than the Swayne's hartebeest. The horns grow in a wide "V" shape, unlike the wide bracket shape of Swayne's hartebeest and the narrow "V" of Lelwel hartebeest, curving backward and slightly inward. It occurs in Ethiopia, in a small area to the east of Omo River and north of Lake Turkana, stretching north-east of Lake Chew Bahir to near Lake Chamo.

== Evolution ==
The genus Alcelaphus emerged about 4.4 million years ago in a clade whose other members were Damalops, Numidocapra, Rabaticeras, Megalotragus, Oreonagor, and Connochaetes. An analysis using phylogeographic patterns within hartebeest populations suggested a possible origin of Alcelaphus in eastern Africa. Alcelaphus quickly radiated across the African savannas, replacing several previous forms (such as a relative of the hirola). Flagstad and colleagues showed an early split in the hartebeest populations into two distinct lineages around 0.5 million years ago – one to the north and the other to the south of the equator. The northern lineage further diverged into eastern and western lineages, nearly 400,000 years ago, most probably as a result of the expanding central African rainforest belt and subsequent contraction of savanna habitats during a period of global warming. The eastern lineage gave rise to the Coke's, Swayne's, Tora and Lelwel hartebeest; and from the western lineage evolved the Bubal and western hartebeest. The southern lineage gave rise to Lichtenstein's and red hartebeest. These two taxa are phylogenetically close, having diverged only 200,000 years ago. The study concluded that these major events throughout the hartebeest's evolution are strongly related to climatic factors, and that there had been successive bursts of radiation from a more permanent population—a refugium—in eastern Africa; this could be vital to understanding the evolutionary history of not only the hartebeest but also other mammals of the African savanna. 700,000 years ago. Fossils of the red hartebeest have been found in Elandsfontein, Cornelia (Free State) and Florisbad in South Africa, as well as in Kabwe in Zambia. In Israel, hartebeest remains have been found in northern Negev, Shephelah, Sharon Plain and Tel Lachish. This population of the hartebeest was originally limited to the open country of the southernmost regions of the southern Levant. It was probably hunted in Egypt, which affected the numbers in the Levant, and disconnected it from its main population in Africa.

== Description ==
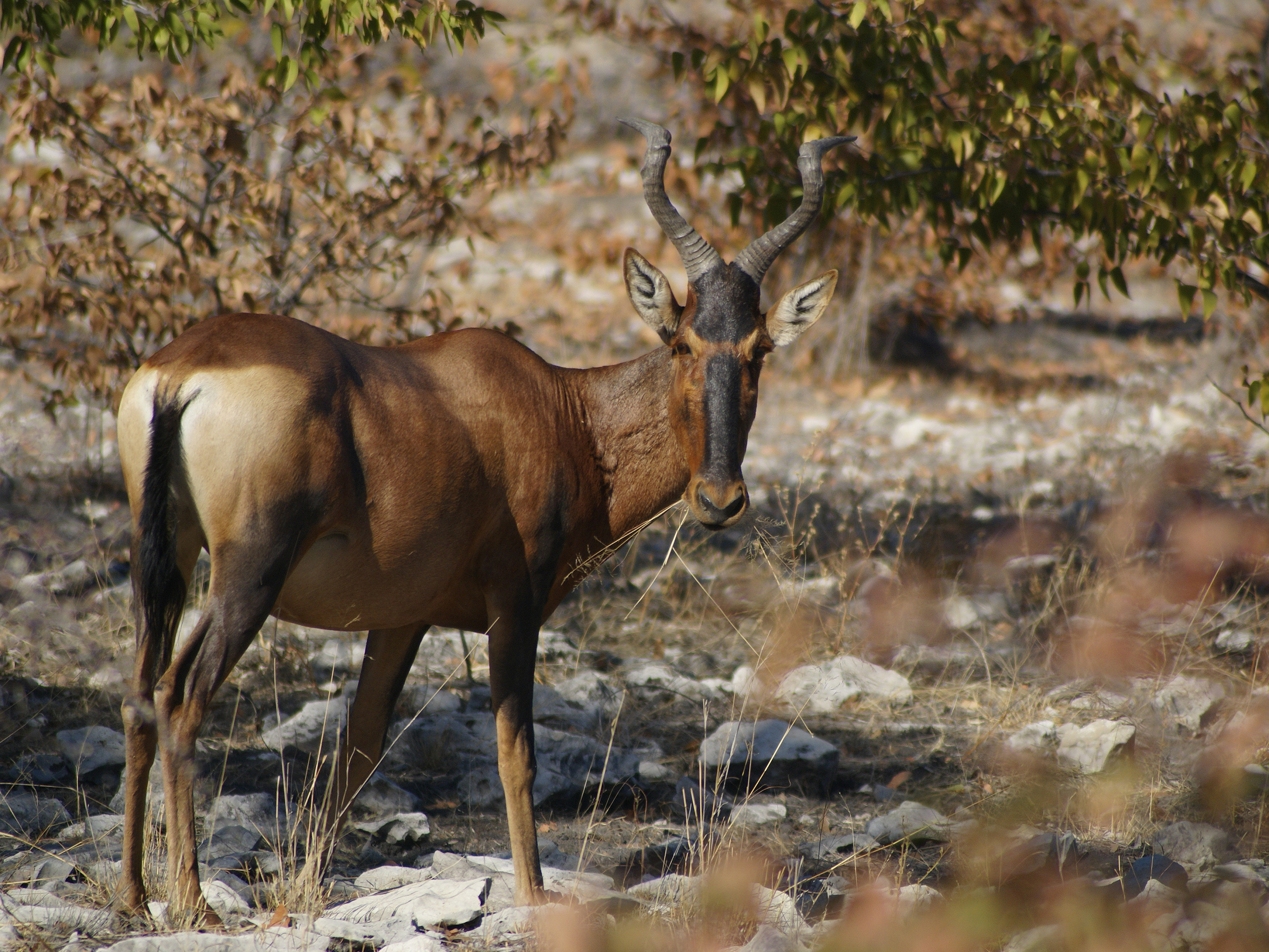
A red hartebeest showing the dark face, black tail, white rump and V-shaped horns

A large antelope with a particularly elongated forehead and oddly shaped horns, the hartebeest stands just over 1 m (3 ft 3 in) at the shoulder, and has a typical head-and-body length of 2 to 2.5 m (6 ft 7 in to 8 ft 2 in). The weight ranges from 100 to 200 kg (220 to 440 lb). The tail, 40 to 60 cm (16 to 24 in) long, ends in a black tuft. The other distinctive features of the hartebeest are its long legs (often with black markings), short neck, and pointed ears. A study correlated the size of hartebeest species to habitat productivity and rainfall. The western hartebeest is the largest subspecies, and has a characteristic white line between the eyes. The red hartebeest is also large, with a black forehead and a contrasting light band between the eyes. The large Lelwel hartebeest has dark stripes on the front of its legs. Coke's hartebeest is moderately large, with a shorter forehead and longer tail in comparison to the other subspecies. Lichtenstein's hartebeest is smaller, with dark stripes on the front of the legs, as in the Lelwel hartebeest. The Swayne's hartebeest is smaller than the Tora hartebeest, but both have a shorter forehead and similar appearance.

Generally short and shiny, the coat varies in colour according to subspecies. The western hartebeest is a pale sandy-brown, but the front of the legs are darker. The red hartebeest is a reddish-brown, with a dark face. Black markings can be observed on the chin, the back of the neck, shoulders, hips and legs; these are in sharp contrast with the broad white patches that mark its flanks and lower rump. The Lelwel hartebeest is a reddish tan. Coke's hartebeest is reddish to tawny in the upper parts, but has relatively lighter legs and rump. Lichtenstein's hartebeest is reddish brown, though the flanks are a lighter tan and the rump whitish. The Tora hartebeest is a dark reddish brown in the upper part of the body, the face, the forelegs and the rump, but the hindlegs and the underbelly are a yellowish white. The Swayne's hartebeest is a rich chocolate brown with fine spots of white that are actually the white tips of its hairs. Its face is black save for the chocolate band below the eyes. The shoulders and upper part of the legs are black. Fine textured, the body hair of the hartebeest is about 25 mm (1 in) long. The hartebeest has preorbital glands (glands near the eyes) with a central duct, that secrete a dark sticky fluid in Coke's and Lichtenstein's hartebeest, and a colourless fluid in the Lelwel hartebeest.

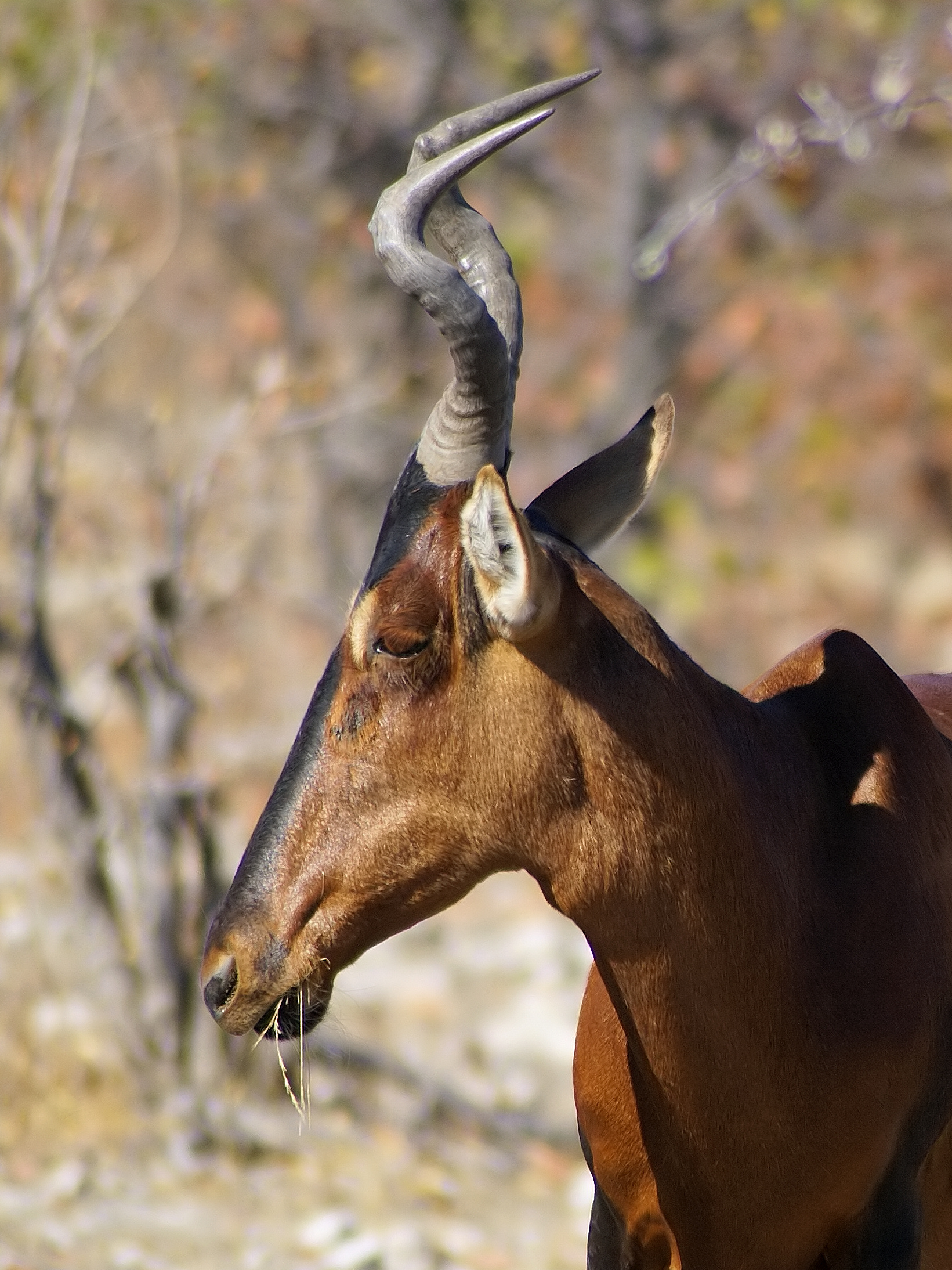
A close head-shot of a red hartebeest

Both sexes of all subspecies have horns, with those of females being more slender. Horns can reach lengths of 45–70 cm (18–28 in); the maximum horn length is 74.9 cm (29 1/2 in), recorded from a Namibian red hartebeest. The horns of the western hartebeest are thick and appear U-shaped from the front and Z-shaped from the sides, growing backward at first and then forward, ending with a sharp backward turn. The horns of the red and the Lelwel hartebeest are similar to those of the western hartebeest, but appear V-shaped when viewed from the front. The Lichtenstein's hartebeest has thick parallel ringed horns, with a flat base. Its horns are shorter than those of other subspecies, curving upward then sharply forward, followed by an inward turn at an angle of about 45° and a final backward turn. The horns of Swayne's hartebeest are thin and shaped like parentheses, curving upward and then backward. The horns of the Tora hartebeest are particularly thin and spread out sideways, diverging more than in any other subspecies.

Apart from its long face, the large chest and the sharply sloping back differentiate the hartebeest from other antelopes. The hartebeest shares several physical traits with the sassabies (genus Damaliscus), such as an elongated and narrow face, the shape of the horns, the pelage texture and colour, and the terminal tuft of the tail. The wildebeest have more specialised skull and horn features than the hartebeest. The hartebeest exhibits sexual dimorphism, but only slightly, as both sexes bear horns and have similar body masses. The degree of sexual dimorphism varies by subspecies. Males are 8% heavier than females in Swayne's and Lichtenstein's hartebeest, and 23% heavier in the red hartebeest. In one study, the highest dimorphism was found in skull weight. Another study concluded that the length of the breeding season is a good predictor of dimorphism in pedicle (the bony structures from which the horns grow) height and skull weight, and the best predictor of the horn circumference.

== Ecology and behaviour ==
Active mainly during daytime, the hartebeest grazes in the early morning and late afternoon, and rests in shade around noon. Gregarious, the species forms herds of up to 300 individuals. Larger numbers gather in places with abundant grass. In 1963, a congregation of 10,000 animals was recorded on the plains near Sekoma Pan in Botswana. However, moving herds are not so cohesive, and tend to disperse frequently. The members of a herd can be divided into four groups: territorial adult males, non-territorial adult males, young males, and the females with their young. The females form groups of five to 12 animals, with four generations of young in the group. Females fight for dominance over the herd. Sparring between males and females is common. At three or four years of age, the males can attempt to take over a territory and its female members. A resident male defends his territory and will fight if provoked. The male marks the border of his territory through defecation.

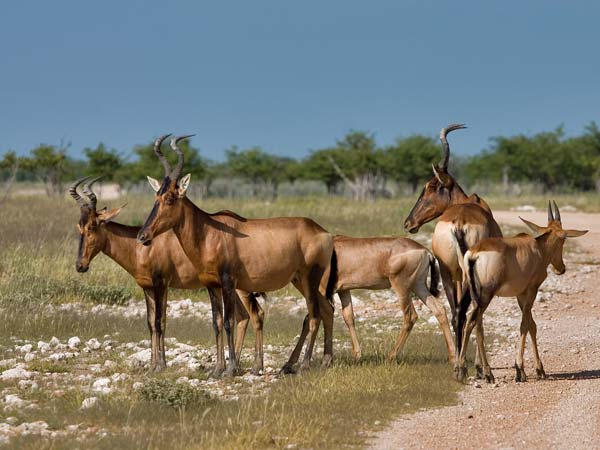
A herd of hartebeest

Hartebeest are remarkably alert and cautious animals with highly developed brains. Generally calm in nature, hartebeest can be ferocious when provoked. While feeding, one individual stays on the lookout for danger, often standing on a termite mound to see farther. At times of danger, the whole herd flees in a single file after an individual suddenly starts off. Adult hartebeest are preyed upon by lions, leopards, hyenas and wild dogs; cheetahs and jackals target juveniles. Crocodiles may also prey on hartebeest.

The thin long legs of the hartebeest provide for a quick escape in an open habitat; if attacked, the formidable horns are used to ward off the predator. The elevated position of the eyes enables the hartebeest to inspect its surroundings continuously even as it is grazing. The muzzle has evolved so as to derive maximum nutrition from even a frugal diet. The horns are also used during fights among males for dominance in the breeding season; the clash of the horns is loud enough that it can be heard from hundreds of metres away. The beginning of a fight is marked with a series of head movements and stances, as well as depositing droppings on dung piles. The opponents drop onto their knees and, after giving a hammer-like blow, begin wrestling, their horns interlocking. One attempts to fling the head of the other to one side to stab the neck and shoulders with his horns. Fights are rarely serious, but can be fatal if they are.

Like the sassabies, hartebeest produce quiet quacking and grunting sounds. Juveniles tend to be more vocal than adults, and produce a quacking call when alarmed or pursued. The hartebeest uses defecation as an olfactory and visual display. Herds are generally sedentary, and tend to migrate only under adverse conditions such as natural calamities. The hartebeest is the least migratory in the tribe Alcelaphini (which also includes wildebeest and sassabies), and also consumes the least amount of water and has the lowest metabolic rate among the members of the tribe.

=== Parasites and diseases ===
Several parasites have been isolated from the hartebeest. These parasites regularly alternate between hartebeest and gazelles or wildebeest. Hartebeest can be infected with theileriosis due to Rhipicephalus evertsi and Theileria species. South of the Sahara, common parasites include Loewioestrus variolosus, Gedoelstia cristata and G. hassleri. The latter two species can cause serious diseases such as encephalitis. However, parasites are not always harmful – 252 larvae were found in the head of one Zambian individual without any pathogenicity. Nematodes, cestodes, paramphistomes; and the roundworm Setaria labiatopapillosa have also been isolated from the hartebeest. In 1931, a red hartebeest in Gobabis (southwestern Africa) was infected with long, thin worms. These were named Longistrongylus meyeri after their collector, T. Meyer.

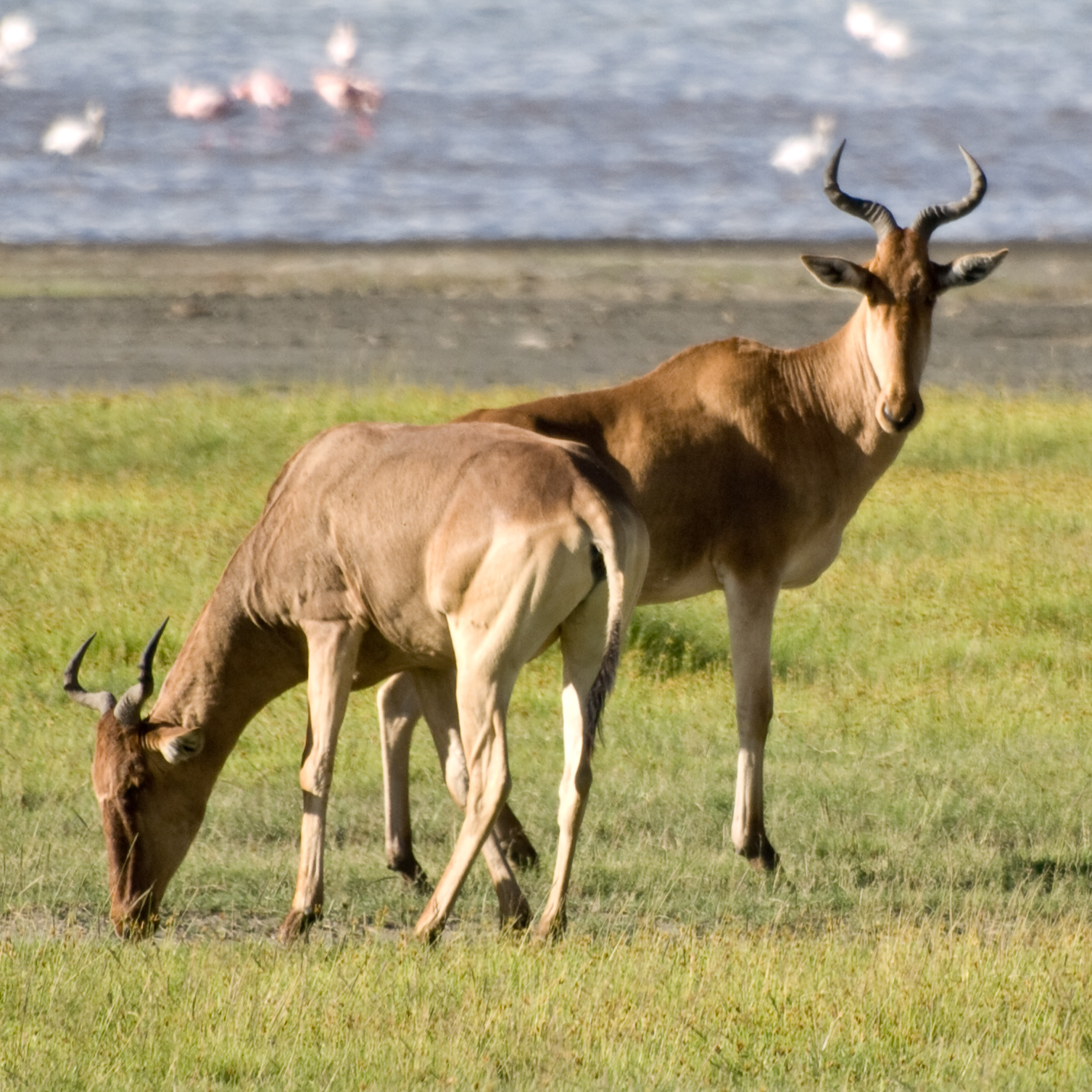
Hartebeest feed primarily on grasses.

=== Diet ===
Hartebeest are primarily grazers, and their diets consist mostly of grasses. A study in the Nazinga Game Ranch in Burkina Faso found that the hartebeest's skull structure eased the acquisition and chewing of highly fibrous foods. The hartebeest has much lower food intake than the other members of Alcelaphini. The long thin muzzle of the hartebeest assists in feeding on leaf blades of short grasses and nibbling off leaf sheaths from grass stems. In addition to this, it can derive nutritious food even from tall senile grasses. These adaptations of the hartebeest enable the animal to feed well even in the dry season, which is usually a difficult period for grazers. For instance, in comparison with the roan antelope, the hartebeest is better at procuring and chewing the scarce regrowth of perennial grasses at times when forage is least available. These unique abilities could have allowed the hartebeest to prevail over other animals millions of years ago, leading to its successful radiation across Africa.

Grasses generally comprise at least 80 per cent of the hartebeest's diet, but they account for over 95 per cent of their food in the wet season, October to May. Jasminum kerstingii is part of the hartebeest's diet at the start of the rainy season. Between seasons, they mainly feed on the culms of grasses. A study found that the hartebeest is able to digest a higher proportion of food than the topi and the wildebeest. In areas with scarce water, it can survive on melons, roots, and tubers.

In a study of grass selectivity among the wildebeest, zebra, and the Coke's hartebeest, the hartebeest showed the highest selectivity. All animals preferred Themeda triandra over Pennisetum mezianum and Digitaria macroblephara. More grass species were eaten in the dry season than in the wet season.

=== Reproduction ===
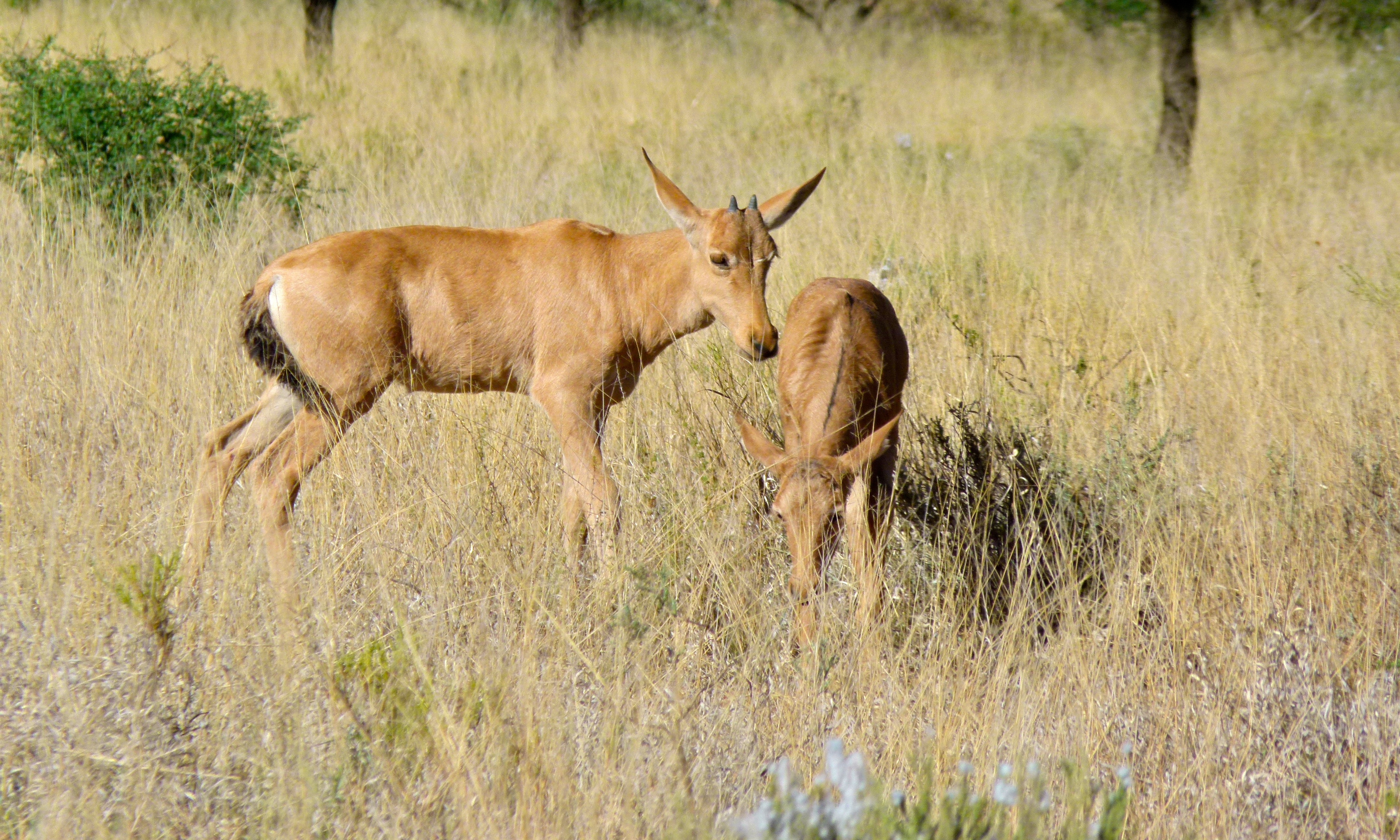
Two red hartebeest juveniles in a grassland

Mating in hartebeest takes place throughout the year, with one or two peaks that can be influenced by the availability of food. Both males and females reach sexual maturity at one to two years of age. Reproduction varies by the subspecies and local factors. Mating takes place in the territories defended by a single male, mostly in open areas. The males may fight fiercely for dominance, following which the dominant male smells the female's genitalia, and follows her if she is in oestrus. Sometimes a female in oestrus holds out her tail slightly to signal her receptivity, and the male tries to block the female's way. She may eventually stand still and allow the male to mount her. Copulation is brief and is often repeated, sometimes twice or more in a minute. Any intruder at this time is chased away. In large herds, females often mate with several males.

Gestation is eight to nine months long, after which a single calf weighing about 9 kg (20 lb) is born. Births usually peak in the dry season, and take place in thickets – unlike the wildebeest, which give birth in groups on the plains. Though calves can move about on their own shortly after birth, they usually lie in the open in close proximity of their mothers. The calf is weaned at four months, but young males stay with their mothers for two and a half years, longer than in other Alcelaphini. Often the mortality rate of male juveniles is high, as they have to face the aggression of territorial adult males and are also deprived of good forage by them. The lifespan is 12 to 15 years.

== Habitat ==
Hartebeest inhabit dry savannas, open plains and wooded grasslands, often moving into more arid places after rainfall. They are more tolerant of wooded areas than other Alcelaphini, and are often found on the edge of woodlands. They have been reported from altitudes on Mount Kenya up to 4,000 m (13,000 ft). The red hartebeest is known to move across large areas, and females roam home ranges of over 1,000 km^{2} (390 sq mi), with male territories 200 km^{2} (77 sq mi) in size. Females in the Nairobi National Park (Kenya) have individual home ranges stretching over 3.7–5.5 km^{2} (1 3/8–2 1/8 sq mi), which are not particularly associated with any one female group. Average female home ranges are large enough to include 20 to 30 male territories.

== Status and conservation ==
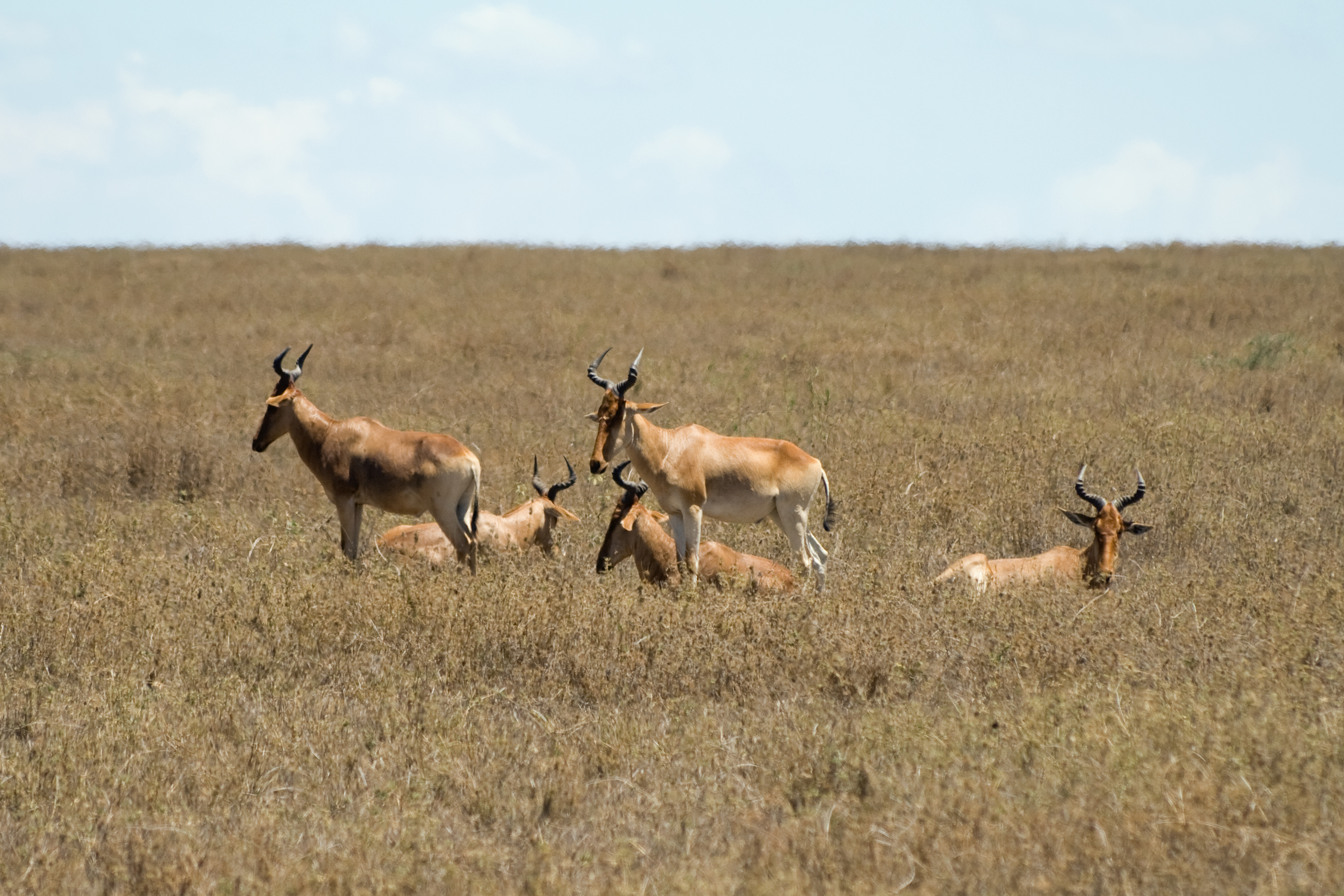
Coke's hartebeest in Serengeti National Park, Tanzania

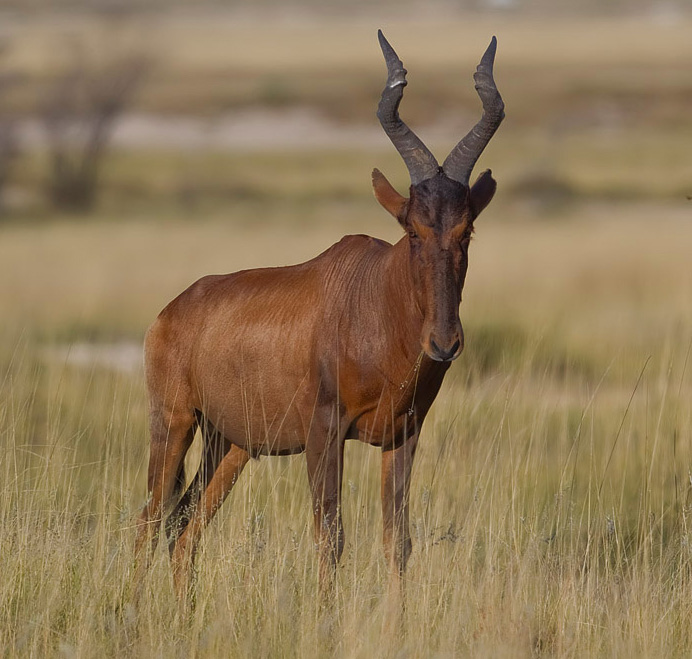
Red hartebeest in Etosha National Park, Namibia

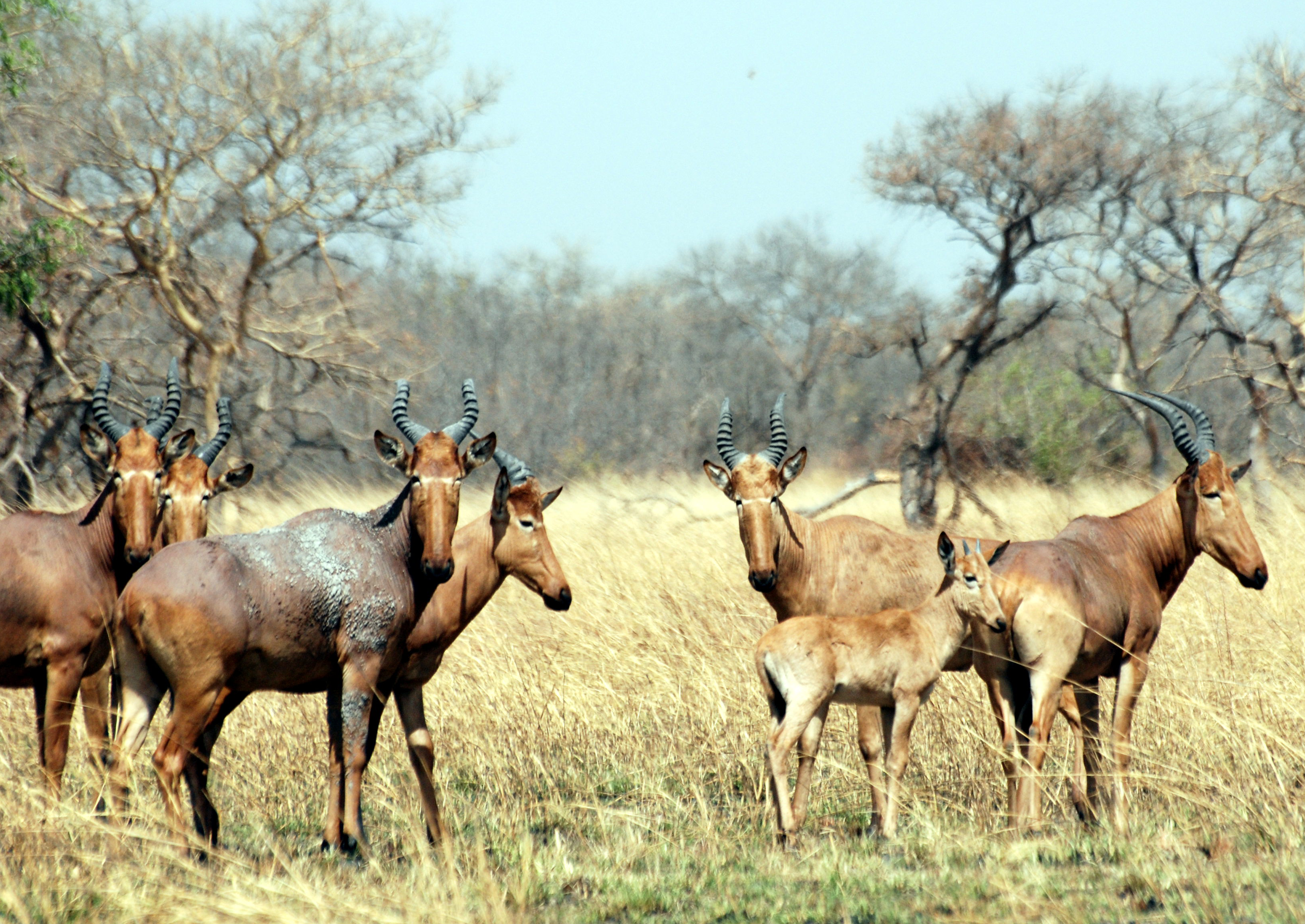
Western hartebeest in Pendjari National Park, Benin

Each hartebeest subspecies is listed under a different conservation status by the International Union for Conservation of Nature. The species as a whole is classified as Least Concern by the IUCN. The hartebeest is extinct in Algeria, Egypt, Lesotho, Libya, Morocco, Somalia, and Tunisia.

- The Bubal hartebeest has been declared extinct since 1994. German explorer Heinrich Barth, in his works of 1857, cites firearms and European intrusion among the reasons for the decrease in its numbers. It was extinct in Tunisia by the late 19th century. The last individual was shot in Missour (Algeria) in 1925.
- Coke's hartebeest is listed as Least Concern. This species has been greatly affected by habitat destruction, and about 42,000 Coke's hartebeest occur today in Mara, Serengeti National Park, and Tarangire National Park in Tanzania and Tsavo East National Park in Kenya. The population is decreasing, and 70% of the population lives in protected areas.
- The Lelwel hartebeest is listed as Endangered, and numbers have declined greatly since the 1980s, when its population was over 285,000. It was formerly distributed mainly in the Central African Republic, Ethiopia, northern and northeastern Democratic Republic of Congo and southern Sudan. Fewer than 70,000 individuals are left. Most of the population nowadays is found in Chad in the Salamat region and the Zakouma National Park (Chad), the National Park population benefiting from improved protection and seeing an increase in population since the 1980s; Manovo-Gounda St. Floris National Park and Bamingui-Bangoran National Park and Biosphere Reserve in the Central African Republic, where the populations have been falling; Rumanyika Orugundu Game Reserve and Ibanda Game Reserve in Tanzania; and Murchison Falls National Park in Uganda.
- Lichtenstein's hartebeest is listed as Least Concern, and occurs in protected areas such as the Selous Game Reserve and in the wild in southern and western Tanzania and Zambia.
- The red hartebeest is listed as Least Concern. It is the most widespread, with increasing numbers after its reintroduction into protected and private areas. However, it has been extinct in Lesotho since the twentieth century. Its population is estimated to be over 130,000 (as of 2008), mostly in southern Africa. In Namibia, the largest population occurs in the Etosha National Park. A reintroduced population is flourishing in the Malolotja Nature Reserve (Eswatini), outside its range. However, numbers have seen a sharp fall in southwestern Botswana.
- The Tora hartebeest is listed as Critically Endangered; the IUCN has ascertained that fewer than 250 mature individuals survive as of 2008. It is possibly extinct due to excessive hunting and agricultural expansion, but may still exist in smaller numbers in Eritrea and Ethiopia. There have been unconfirmed reports of sightings by locals of the Tora hartebeest southeast of the Dinder National Park, from where it had disappeared before 1960.
- Swayne's hartebeest is listed as Endangered, and is close to being Critically Endangered. The total population in 2008 was less than 600, of which the mature specimens numbered 250. But in 2021, the population has slowly increased from 600 to 1528 individuals. It is confined to four major protected areas: the Senkele Wildlife Sanctuary, Nechisar National Park, Awash National Park and Maze National Park. The hartebeest in Senkele have to compete with the livestock of the Oromo people. A study in the Nechisar National Park during 2009 and 2010 found a considerable increase in the livestock of the Oromos (49.9% and 56.5% increase during 2006 and 2010, respectively), illegal resource exploitation, and habitat loss as major threats to the Swayne's hartebeest populations there.
- The western hartebeest is listed as Near Threatened. It has been eliminated from most of its range, including the southwestern savannas and Boucle du Baoulé National Park in Mali; southwestern Niger; southern Senegal; Gambia; Ivory Coast; Burkina Faso. Small populations survive in Bafing National Park and the area bounded by Bamako, Bougouni and Sikasso in Mali; Tamou Reserve in Niger; Niokolo-Koba National Park in Senegal; Comoé National Park in Ivory Coast; Diefoula forest and Nazinga Game Ranch in Burkina Faso; Pendjari National Park in Benin; and Bouba Njida, Bénoué, and Faro National Parks in Cameroon.

== Relationship with humans ==
Hartebeest are popular game and trophy animals as they are prominently visible and hence easy to hunt. Pictorial as well as epigraphic evidence from Egypt suggests that in the Upper Palaeolithic age, Egyptians hunted hartebeest and domesticated them. The hartebeest was a prominent source of meat, but its economic significance was lower than that of gazelles and other desert species. However, from the beginning of the Neolithic age, hunting became less common and consequently the remains of the hartebeest from this period in ancient Egypt, where it is now extinct, are rare.

In a study on the effect of place and sex on carcass characteristics, the average carcass weight of the male red hartebeest was 79.3 kg (174 3/4 lb) and that of females was 56 kg (123 lb). The meat of the animals from Qua-Qua region had the highest lipid content—1.3 g (20 gr) per 100 g (3 1/2 oz) of meat. Negligible differences were found in the concentrations of individual fatty acids, amino acids, and minerals. The study considered hartebeest meat to be healthy, as the ratio of polyunsaturated to saturated fatty acids was 0.78, slightly more than the recommended 0.7.
