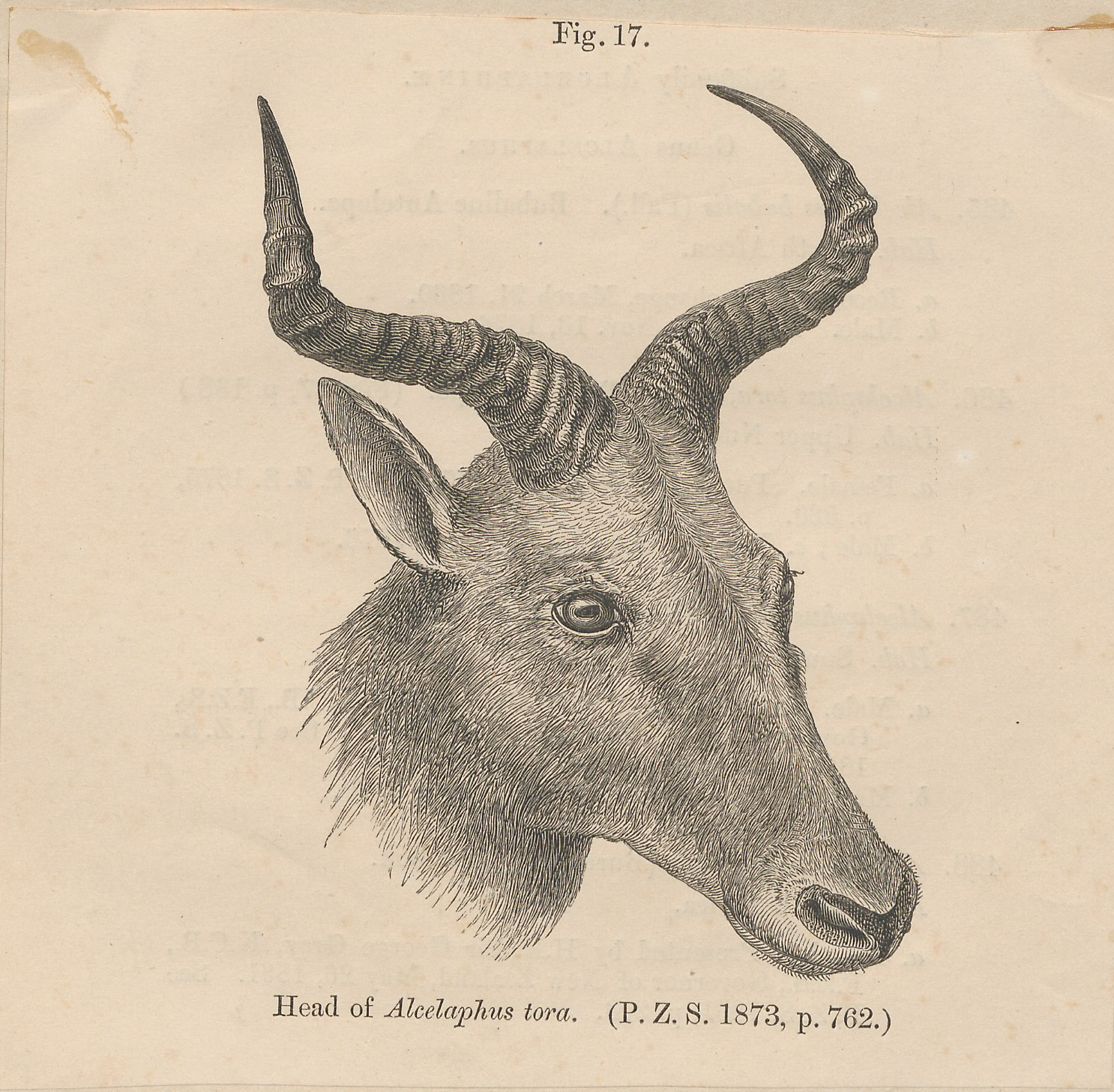

Conservation status
- Critically endangered, possibly extinct (IUCN 3.1)

- Endangered (ESA)

Scientific classification
- Kingdom: Animalia
- Phylum: Chordata
- Class: Mammalia
- Order: Artiodactyla
- Family: Bovidae
- Subfamily: Alcelaphinae
- Genus: Alcelaphus
- Species: A. buselaphus
- Subspecies: A. b. tora

Trinomial name
- Alcelaphus buselaphus tora (Gray, 1873)

= Tora hartebeest =

Subspecies of mammal

Tora Hartebeest female shot in Eritrea near the Tekeze River during an Italian expedition between 1922-1923. This is the species' only known photograph.

The tora hartebeest, or simply tora (Alcelaphus buselaphus tora), is an extremely endangered antelope, native to Eritrea and Ethiopia. It has possibly been extirpated from Sudan. One of the most critically endangered large mammals in the world, it is threatened by poaching and habitat loss. The subspecies has not been seen in 20 years, causing fears of extinction.

A 2007 survey in Eritrea and Ethiopia found no evidence for Tora in its native habitat, pointing also to a decrease in the presence of large mammals in the region due to poaching and habitat loss.

The last known reported sighting occurred in 1996 during an aerial survey in the Dinder River valley in Ethiopia, near the Sudan border.

In 2013, IUCN's Eritrea Reconnaissance, September 2013 Trip report suggested it was very possible that Tora Hartebeest was extinct due to the absence of recent records.
