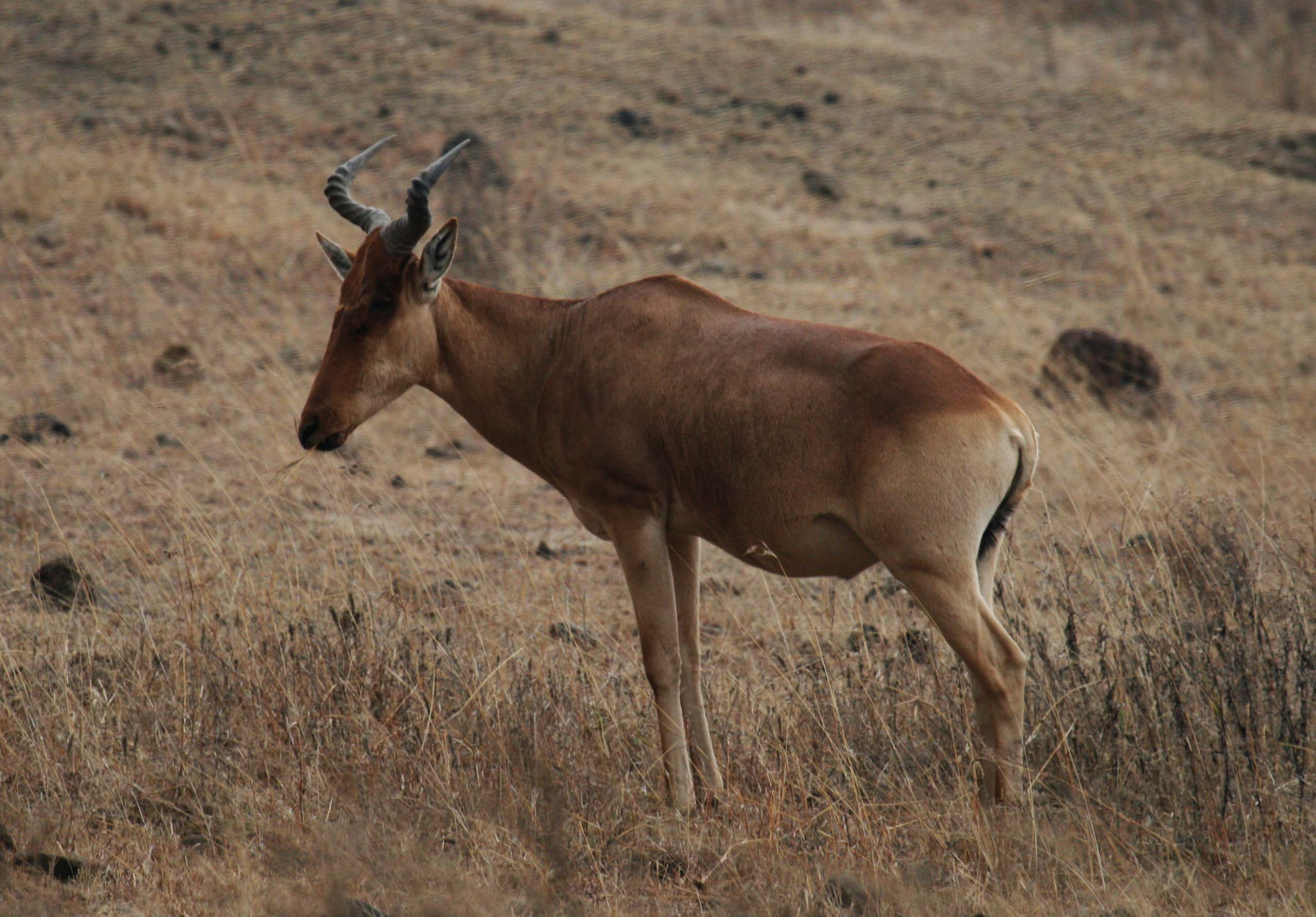
- At the Ngorongoro Crater, Tanzania

Conservation status
- Least Concern (IUCN 3.1)

Scientific classification
- Kingdom: Animalia
- Phylum: Chordata
- Class: Mammalia
- Infraclass: Placentalia
- Order: Artiodactyla
- Family: Bovidae
- Subfamily: Alcelaphinae
- Genus: Alcelaphus
- Species: A. buselaphus
- Subspecies: A. b. cokii

Trinomial name
- Alcelaphus buselaphus cokii Günther, 1884
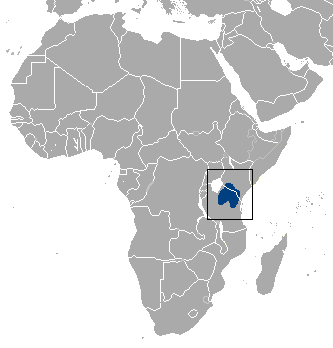
- The range

= Coke's hartebeest =

Species of antelope

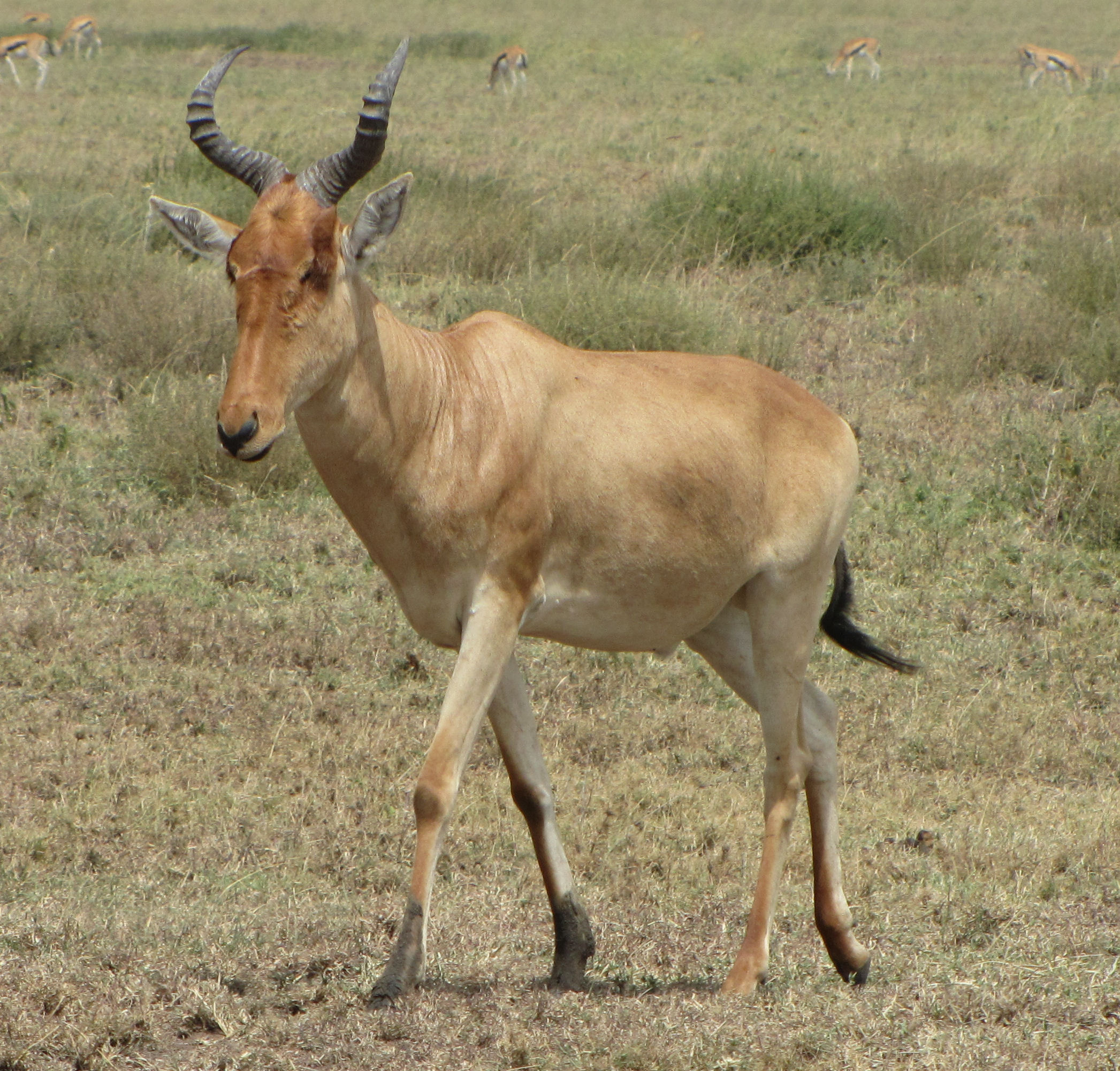
Serengeti, Tanzania

Coke's hartebeest (Alcelaphus buselaphus cokii) or Kongoni is a large migratory antelope that is native to Kenya and Tanzania.

It can breed with Lelwel hartebeest to produce a hybrid known as the Kenya Highland hartebeest (Alcelaphus buselaphus lelwel x cokii).

== Appearance ==
Coke's hartebeest has a long and narrow face with pointed ears. It has long legs, a sloping back, and ridged horns that are found in both males and females. It has short reddish-brown fur, a white rump, and a short tail with a blackish tuft at the end. Calves have a paler appearance.

Males may measure anywhere from 117–124 cm (46–49 in; 3.84–4.07 ft) and weigh about 129–171 kg (284–377 lb), while females are slightly smaller, around 112 cm (44 in; 3.67 ft) tall and 116–148 kg (256–326 lb). The horns may be up to 70 cm (28 in) long.

== Behavior ==
=== Herding Behavior ===
Herds represent mostly female-led hierarchies with a typical number of 6-30 individuals. They are semi-closed to outsiders. These herds are largely migratory. Territorial bulls usually remain separate from the females except when actively herding or courting.

Females can sometimes stay indefinitely on a single territory as harems. Bachelor herds can number up to 35 individuals.

=== Parent & Offspring Behavior ===
Pregnant females often isolate, only accompanied by one or sometimes more previous offspring. Newly birthed calves take about 30 minutes to steadily stand. Within 10 minutes, calves can walk and run. The hiding and isolation phase of females and new calves lasts for 2 weeks. Female Coke's hartebeest calve every 9–10 months, too early for the last calf to become independent.

Male calves accompany their mothers for up to 2 years, a year longer than other alcelaphines, although they mature at the same age as wildebeests, at 3–4 years. Male calves may simply run away from the original herd or be chased away by the dominant bull at 3 years, when they join bachelor herds. Between 3–4 years, males may leave the bachelor herds and begin searching for their own territories.

== Adaptations to the desert environment ==
The hot and dry environment of Coke's hartebeest has led to the development of several thermoregulatory adaptations. This species uses panting as a means of evaporative cooling that responds to skin temperature rather than core body temperature. Cutaneous water loss is limited through maintenance of a lower basal metabolic rate, which also aids in hartebeest water economy. Most desert animals maintain a lower metabolic rate in keeping with the low nutrient availability within their environments. For hartebeest, the metabolic response during the fasted state (when food has been digested and stored) leads to adaptations that aid in protein conservation. Furthermore, they have a low water turnover amount of 9–17 L/kg (0.90–1.70 imp gal/lb) per day, in comparison to other bovines of similar size, such as the eland, which has a turnover rate of 12.7 L/kg (1.27 imp gal/lb) per day. This helps Coke's hartebeest limit its water expenditure in hot and arid habitats.
