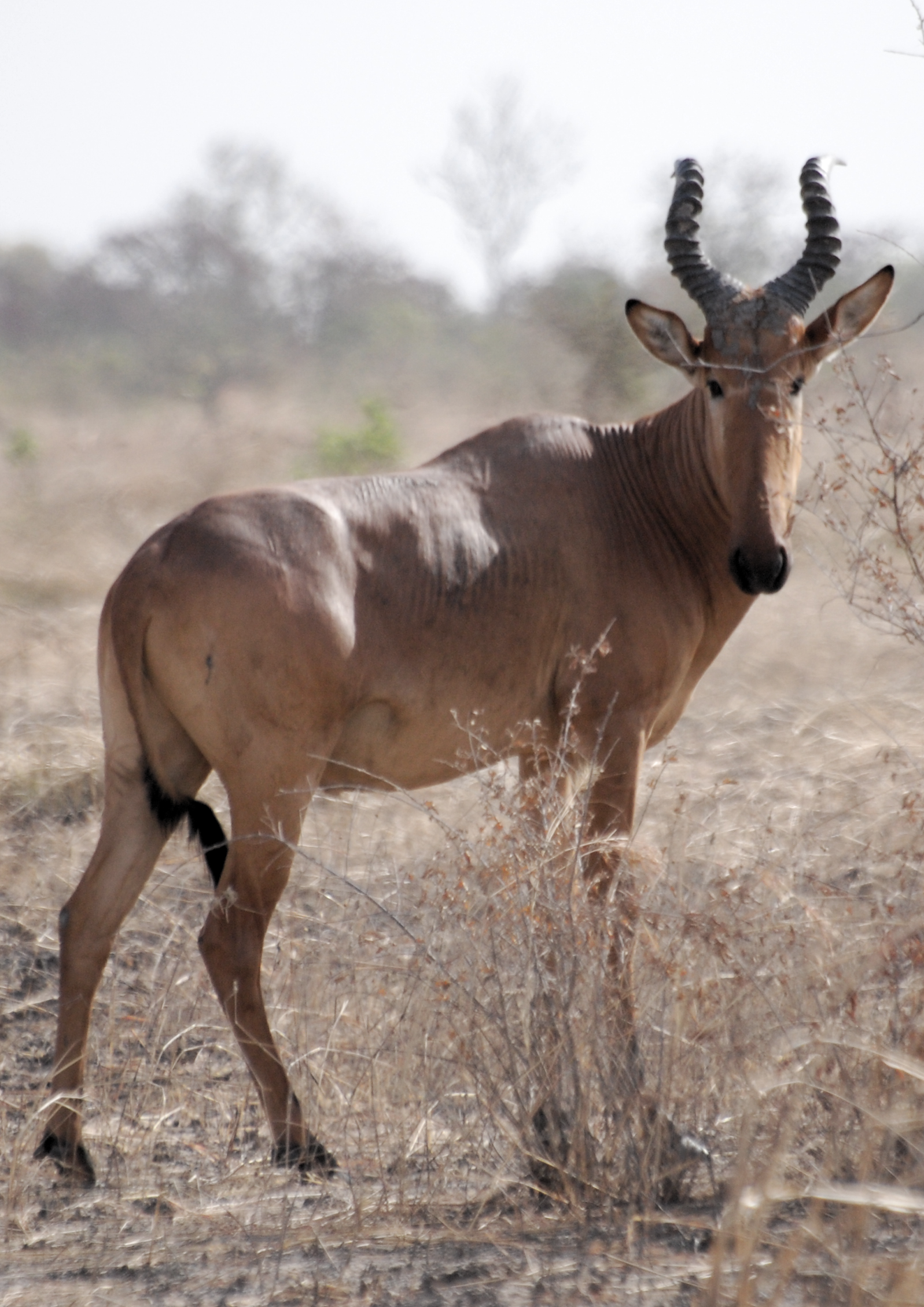
- Alcelaphus buselaphus major

Conservation status
- Near Threatened (IUCN 3.1)

Scientific classification
- Kingdom: Animalia
- Phylum: Chordata
- Class: Mammalia
- Infraclass: Placentalia
- Order: Artiodactyla
- Family: Bovidae
- Subfamily: Alcelaphinae
- Genus: Alcelaphus
- Species: A. buselaphus
- Subspecies: A. b. major

Trinomial name
- Alcelaphus buselaphus major (Blyth, 1869)
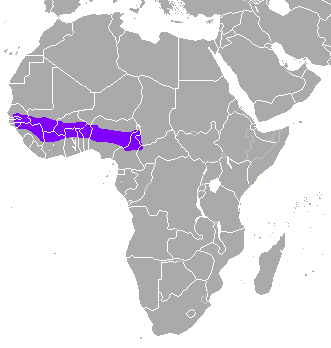
- Range map

= Western hartebeest =

Subspecies of hartebeest

The western hartebeest (Alcelaphus buselaphus major) is an antelope native to the medium to tall grassland plains of Benin, Burkina Faso, Cameroon, the Central African Republic, Chad, Côte d'Ivoire, Ghana, Guinea, Guinea-Bissau, Mali, Niger, Nigeria, Senegal, and Togo. It is possibly extirpated from Gambia.

Average adults stand 1.4 m (4.6 ft) tall at the shoulder and weigh 145 kg (320 lb). A western hartebeest's coat is fawn-colored, ranging from tan to dark brown. It has a small hump at the front shoulders. It has slim legs and a very narrow face. Both sexes are horned. Horns may be 45–70 cm (18–28 in) long. Considerable variation in horn growth occurs, but they generally grow sideways out from the head, before curving forward, then inward and backward. The horns are terminated by sharp tips.

The western hartebeest is mainly active during the day. A herbivore, it grazes during the cooler morning and afternoon periods, resting in shaded areas during the hot daytime. Females form herds of five to 12 members, while males generally remain solitary. While the herd is feeding, one member will act as a sentry, watching for possible predators. If threatened, the herd flees as a single file, reaching speeds of up to 80 km/h (50 mph), making it one of the fastest antelopes. Herds are generally sedentary; animals spend much of their day resting in shade to escape noon-time heat. They will move as a herd to find water. In particularly dry seasons, or in times of drought, herds of females will migrate together, seeking water or better grazing.

Western hartebeest are generally not aggressive, but they will fight to protect their young or their claimed area. Males claim areas of plains averaging 31 ha (0.31 km^{2}), for periods of four to five years. Males protect their claimed area fiercely. Males have been known to go without water to protect their territory. If a male leaves his territory to find water, another male may usurp the territory.

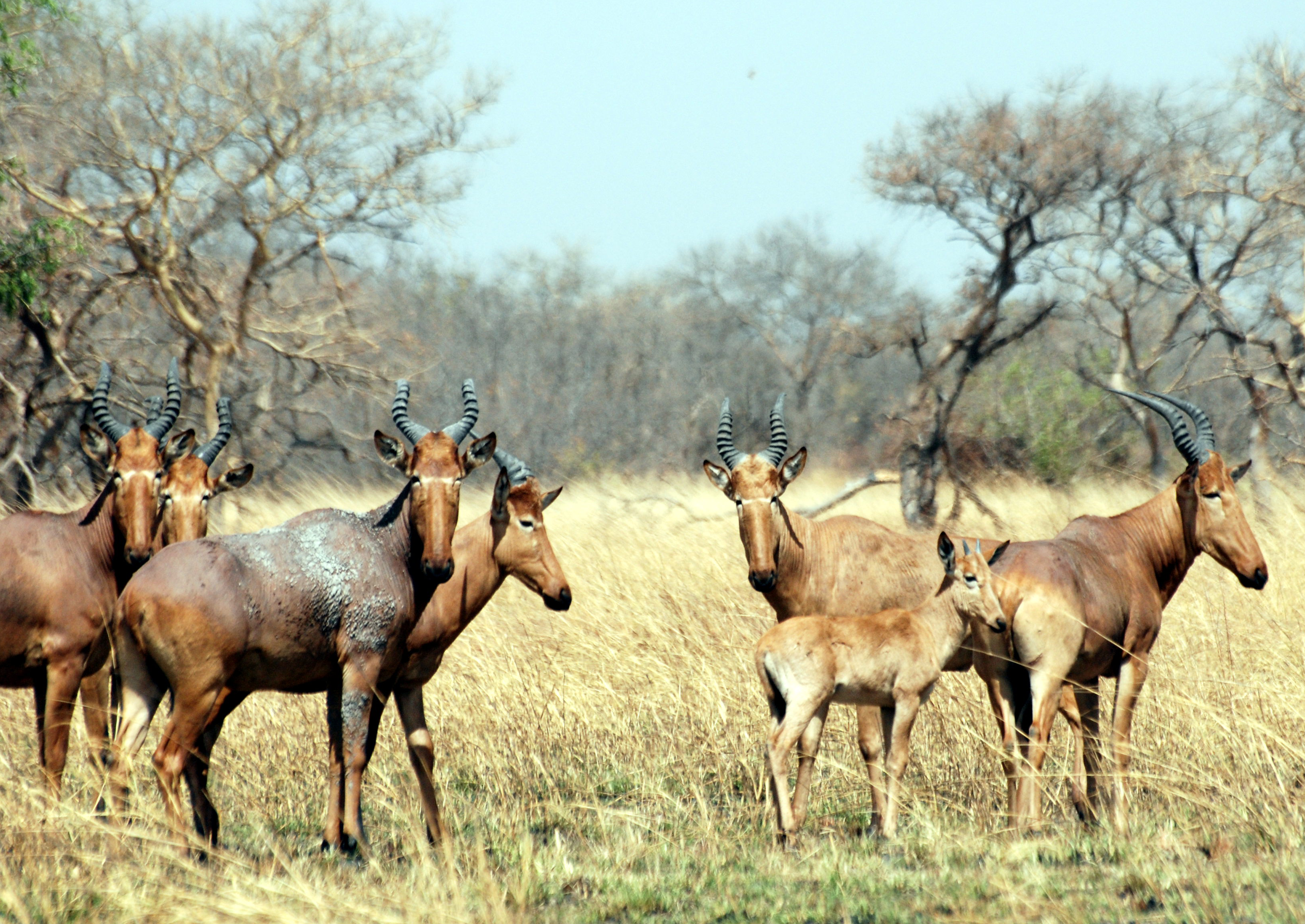
Alcelaphus buselaphus herd in the Pendjari Nationalpark, West Africa
