= Nazinga Game Ranch =

Protected area in Burkina Faso

Coordinates: 11°11′06″N 1°29′04″W

Nazinga Game Ranch is a game ranch in southern Burkina Faso.

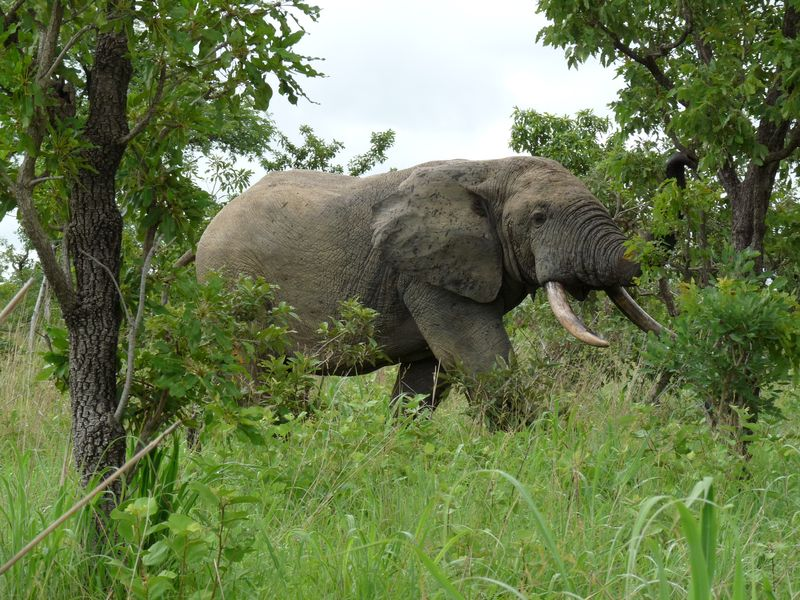
A male elephant at Nazinga, Burkina Faso in 2010.

== History ==
It was established in 1979 by Canadian brothers who grew up in the country, Robert and Clark Lungren. After years of observing the devastating impact of cyclical drought on domesticated livestock as well as the effects of poor resource management (deforestation, overgrazing, burning, soil fatigue, etc.) Clark believed that the key to saving the African people from famine and its wildlife from extinction was found in resource development. He set out to prove that when human prosperity can be generated through sustainable management of its natural resources, both people and environment win.

After several years of research and raising funds, Clark focused on a relatively unsettled region of Upper Volta (now Burkina Faso). Nazinga offered a topologically varied environment, but endemic poaching was rapidly decimating the wildlife. He and Rob set up a conservation project with their families: using local labor they constructed dams, developed some 600 km of roads, built test paddocks and an administrative base, negotiated local subsistence farmers to abandon fields within the ranch boundaries, and banned all livestock from its land. They hired local poachers as game keepers in order to give them an incentive to protect it, established a fishing management program, and invited biologists from several countries to help them carry out wildlife and ecological studies. They also reintroduced native wildlife species which had been eradicated from the region.

The results exceeded all expectations. The studies found that wildlife has a far higher tolerance to drought, thrived on varieties of grasses and leaves that cattle derived little nutrition from, and did not cause erosion by overgrazing. They also produced far more meat per kilogram of animal than livestock. Studies found that culling adult animals by a certain percentage per species actually increased their reproduction rates and replenished the population, while not culling only maintained the reproduction rate at a constant level. As a result, they developed a stringent program of culling wildlife by night and processing the meat under controlled circumstances. This employed a growing number of local people, hugely increased the local protein intake (from the poorest in the country to the highest), and provided a quality and highly marketable meat which was sold in supermarkets in the capital city. Poachers were no longer able to compete with the quantity and quality of legally marketed wild meat. And the Nazinga Game Ranch became a significant source of tax revenue to the national government.

Their success became part of the projects' downfall. The interest of international development funders wanting to get behind the project and the healthy cash flow were too much to resist. In 1989, a year before the project was to be officially turned over to national management, corrupt officials forcibly moved the Lungrens to the capital. They spent the next few years in Ouaga completing the project studies in hopes that the ranch would nevertheless succeed.

Under national management, the Nazinga Game Ranch reverted to a national wildlife park catering to foreign tourists. Poaching and poor management are once more huge problems, and the project no longer stands as a remarkable and successful innovation in tying grass-root ownership to effective environmental management.
