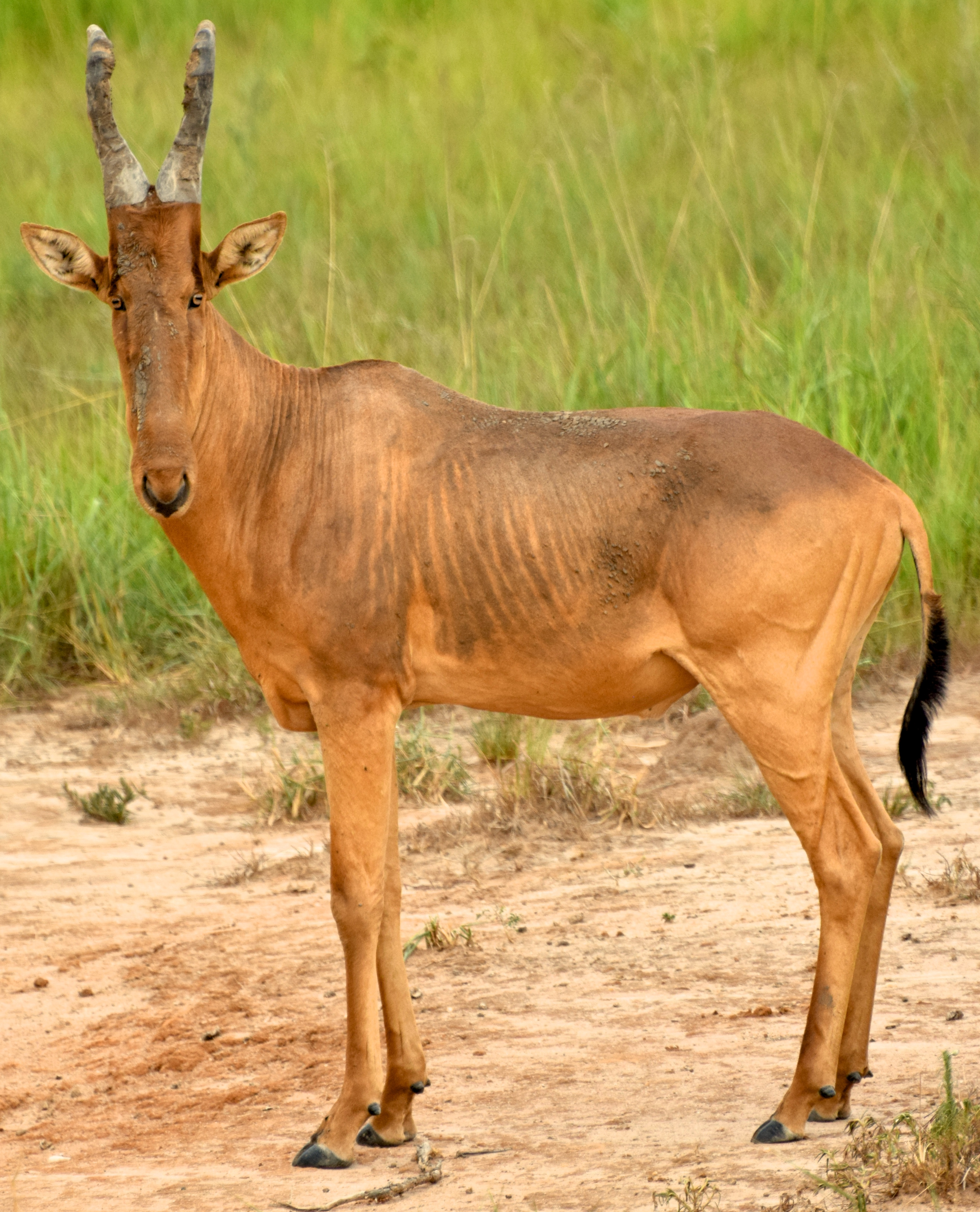
- Male Lelwel hartebeest at Murchison Falls National Park, Uganda.

Conservation status
- Endangered (IUCN 3.1)

Scientific classification
- Kingdom: Animalia
- Phylum: Chordata
- Class: Mammalia
- Order: Artiodactyla
- Family: Bovidae
- Subfamily: Alcelaphinae
- Genus: Alcelaphus
- Species: A. buselaphus
- Subspecies: A. b. lelwel

Trinomial name
- Alcelaphus buselaphus lelwel Heuglin, 1877
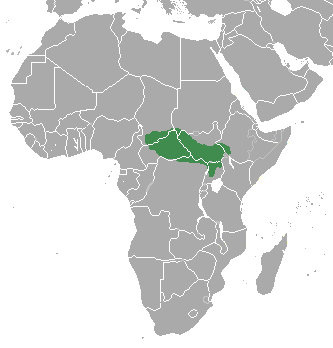
- Range of Lelwel hartebeest

= Lelwel hartebeest =

Antelope native to central Africa

The Lelwel hartebeest (Alcelaphus buselaphus lelwel), also known as Jackson's hartebeest, is an antelope native to Central African Republic, Chad, the Democratic Republic of the Congo, Ethiopia, Kenya, South Sudan, Sudan, Tanzania, and Uganda.

The Lelwel hartebeest can hybridize with Coke's hartebeest to make the Kenya Highland hartebeest (A. b. lelwel × cokii), or with Swayne's hartebeest to make the Neumann hartebeest (A. b. lelwel × swaynei).
