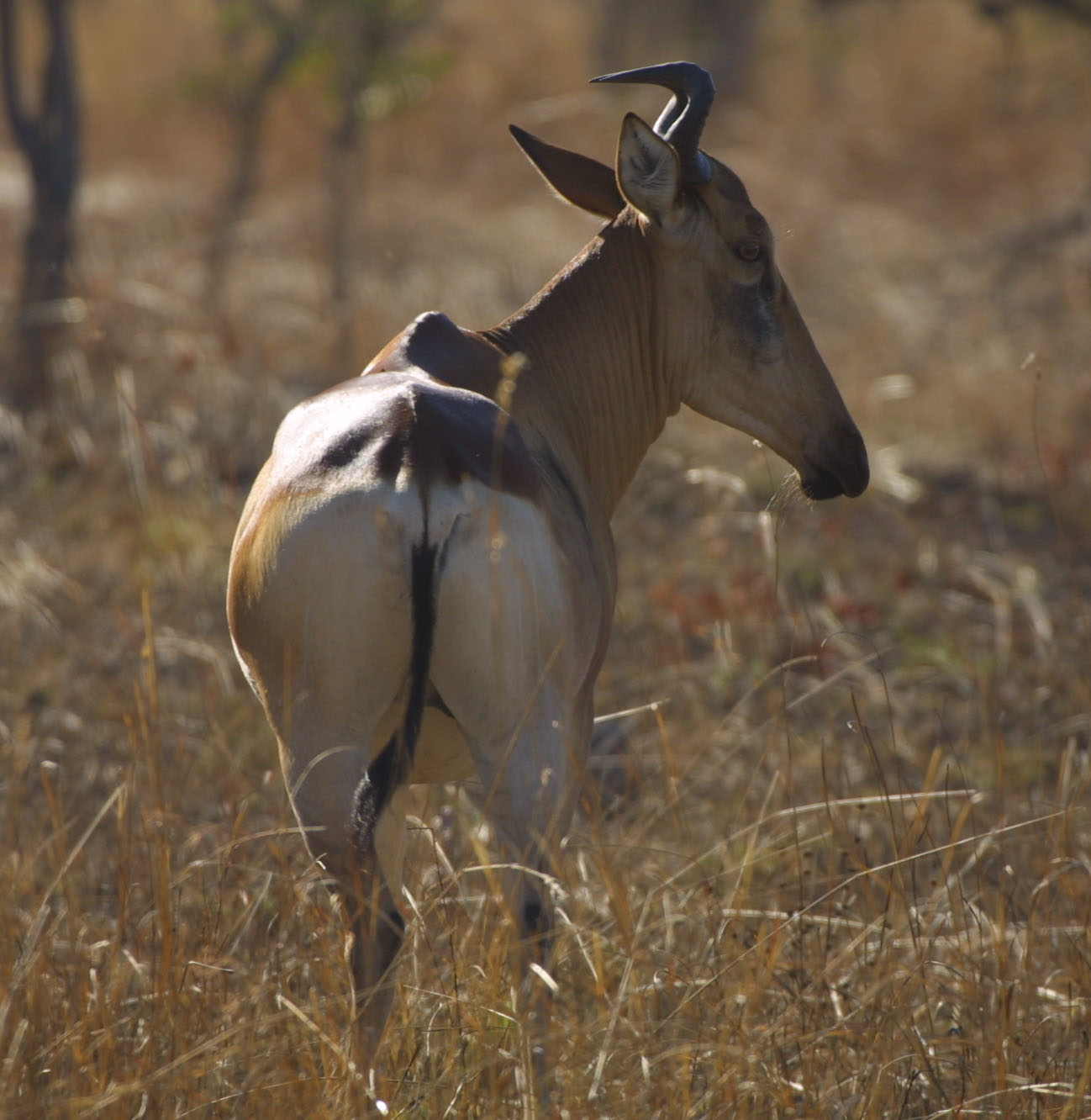
- In the Kafue National Park, Zambia

Conservation status
- Least Concern (IUCN 3.1)

Scientific classification
- Kingdom: Animalia
- Phylum: Chordata
- Class: Mammalia
- Order: Artiodactyla
- Family: Bovidae
- Subfamily: Alcelaphinae
- Genus: Alcelaphus
- Species: A. buselaphus
- Subspecies: A. b. lichtensteinii

Trinomial name
- Alcelaphus buselaphus lichtensteinii Peters, 1849
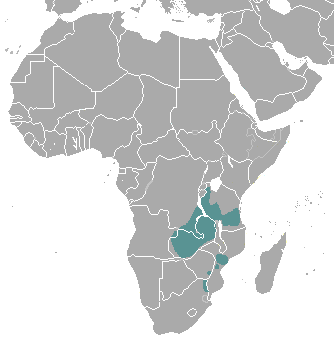
- Distribution of Alcelaphus buselaphus lichtensteinii

Synonyms
- Sigmoceros lichtensteinii Bubalis lichtensteinii

= Lichtenstein's hartebeest =

Subspecies of mammal

Lichtenstein's hartebeest (Alcelaphus buselaphus lichtensteinii) is a subspecies of the hartebeest antelope that dwells in savannahs and floodplains of Southeastern-Central Africa. It is sometimes classified as a unique species, Sigmoceros lichtensteinii.

It derives its name from zoologist Martin Lichtenstein.

== Description ==
It typically stands about 1.25 m (4.1 ft) at the shoulder and has a mass of around 150 kg (330 lb). It has a red-brown colour, which is lighter on the underbelly. The horns found on both sexes appear from the side to be shaped like the letter 'S', and appear from the front to be shaped like the letter 'O' with its upper portions missing. The horns are slightly ridged and reach over 0.5 m (1.6 ft) in length.

== Behavior ==
They live on areas where they eat grasses. They are diurnal (active in the day). They gather in herds of five to 15 females and calves with a single male, which leads them. The male stands sentry duty on termite mounds and the like. Males hold large territories, which they mark by digging up soil with their horns around the borders. Lichtenstein's hartebeest have good eyesight, but a poor sense of smell. Their main sounds are a bellow and a sneeze-snort sound.

They travel in herds, which are mainly kept between 1 and 10 individuals (89% of all LH in Tanzania have been within 1–10 animals). The herd may be composed of more than 10 individuals, but it is rare (Booth 1985). It is noted that the highest number of Lichtenstein's Hartebeest congregating together occur in August/September. The exact reason is unknown, but this is primarily when most calves are born. Add in local migration from other herds and it may be a form of anti-predator grouping to protect newborn calves. However, Bachelor males are often found alone countering the herd mentality (Dowsett 1966; Wilson 1966; Rodgers 1977). Bachelor bulls do not establish territories while solitary bulls will exclude others from their domain (Dowsett 1966). The ratio of male to female LH is 1:2.37.

Lichtenstein's Hartebeest are very territorial mammals and there is no overlap in territories between bulls. The rutting period (breeding season) runs typically from mid October to January, although slight variations exist between different locations (Dowsett 1966). Bachelor bulls will often challenge alpha bulls until the point of complete exhaustion to take over the related female LHs. There are many stereotyped behaviour patterns in the repertoire of the genus Alcephalus that are directly associated with territorial defence (von Richter 1972). Amongst these, pawing and horning the earth are the most conspicuous. In Zimbabwe, the most conspicuous body movements were the "head-to-flank", in which the head is rubbed against the shoulder, and a "head-flagging" movement in which the hartebeest shook its head up and down vigorously when alarmed. Hartebeests mark their territory by forming dung piles in their respective territories.
