= List of protected areas of Ethiopia =

Map of National park and Sanctuaries located in Ethiopia

National parks and other protected areas cover 17% of Ethiopia's land area. They include:

== National parks ==
National Park	Region	Established	Area	Image	Coordinates	Administered by
Abijatta-Shalla National Park	Oromia	1963	887 square kilometres (342 sq mi)		7°31′46″N 38°31′07″E	Federal Government
Alitash National Park	Amhara	2006	2,666 square kilometres (1,029 sq mi)		12°06′32″N 35°33′13″E	Federal Government
Arsi Mountains National Park	Oromia	2011	10,876 square kilometres (4,199 sq mi)			Regional Government
Awash National Park	Oromia and Afar	1958	850 square kilometres (330 sq mi)		9°04′42″N 39°59′36″E	Federal Government
Bejimiz National Park	Benishangul-Gumuz and Amhara	2015	not reported			Regional Government
Borana National Park	Oromia and Somali	2017	45,366 square kilometres (17,516 sq mi)		04°07′N 38°34′E	Regional Government
Bale Mountains National Park	Oromia	1962	2,200 square kilometres (850 sq mi)		6°53′09″N 39°44′05″E	Federal Government
Chebera Churchura National Park	South West Ethiopia	1997	1,190 square kilometres (460 sq mi)		6°53′14″N 36°38′11″E	Regional Government
Dati Wolel National Park	Oromia	1998	431 square kilometres (166 sq mi)			Regional Government
Didessa National Park	Benishangul-Gumuz	2017	Not reported			Regional Government
Gambela National Park	Gambela	1966	5,061 square kilometres (1,954 sq mi)		8°00′17″N 34°03′51″E	Federal Government
Geralle National Park	Somali	1998	3,558 square kilometres (1,374 sq mi)		4°21′56″N 40°57′44″E	Regional Government
Gibe Sheleko National Park	South Ethiopia	2001	360 square kilometres (140 sq mi)			Regional Government
Kafta Humera National Park	Amhara	1999	5,000 square kilometres (1,900 sq mi)		14°14′47″N 36°43′58″E	Federal Government
Loka-Abaya National Park	Sidama	2001	500 square kilometres (190 sq mi)			Regional Government
Mao-Komo National Park	Benishangul-Gumuz and Oromia	2016	not reported			Regional Government
Mago National Park	South Ethiopia	1974	1,942 square kilometres (750 sq mi)		5°31′08″N 36°20′38″E	Regional Government
Maze National Park	South Ethiopia	1997	202 square kilometres (78 sq mi)		6°26′29″N 37°11′19″E	Regional Government
Nech Sar National Park	South Ethiopia	1966	750 square kilometres (290 sq mi)		5°56′01″N 37°40′53″E	Federal Government
Omo National Park	South Ethiopia	1980	4,068 km^{2} (1,571 sq mi)		6°0′N 35°50′E	Federal Government
Simien Mountains National Park	Amhara	1959	412 square kilometres (159 sq mi)		13°18′23″N 38°15′51″E	Federal Government
Yangudi Rassa National Park	Afar	1969	4,731 square kilometres (1,827 sq mi)		10°32′16″N 40°52′40″E	Federal Government

=== Proposed national parks ===
- Afar Depression National Park
- Blue Nile Gorges National Park
- Dessa Forest National Park
- Donkoro Chaka National Park
- Lake Abbe National Park
- Malka Guba National Park
- Ogaden Desert National Park

== Wildlife reserves ==
The Locations of Wildlife Reserves of Ethiopia

- Aledeghi Wildlife Reserve
- Awash-West Wildlife Reserve
- Chelbi Wildlife Reserve (Chelbi or Stephanie)
- Degodi Lark Reserve
- Gewane Wildlife Reserve
- Guassa Community Conservation Area
- Indeltu (Shebelle) Gorges Reserve
- Mille-Serdo Wildlife Reserve
- Shire Wildlife Reserve
- Tama Community Conservation Area (Tama Wildlife Reserve)

== Sanctuaries ==
- Babile Elephant Sanctuary
- Kuni-Muktar Mountain Nyala Sanctuary
- Senkelle Swayne's Hartebeest Sanctuary
- Yabelo Wildlife Sanctuary

=== Proposed sanctuaries ===
- Liben Plain Sanctuary
- Tullo Lafto-Sadden Wildlife Sanctuary

== Controlled hunting areas ==
- Afdem-Gewane Controlled Hunting Area
- Akobo Controlled Hunting Area
- Awash West Controlled Hunting Area
- Boyo Swamp Controlled Hunting Area
- Dabus Valley Controlled Hunting Area
- Eastern Hararghe Controlled Hunting Area
- Erer-Gota Controlled Hunting Area
- Mizan-Teferi Controlled Hunting Area
- Murule Controlled Hunting Area
- Omo West Controlled Hunting Area
- Segen Valley Controlled Hunting Area
- Tedo Controlled Hunting Area

== National forest priority areas ==
- Abelti Gibie National Forest Priority Area
- Abey-Albasa National Forest Priority Area
- Abobo-Gog National Forest Priority Area
- Aloshie-Batu National Forest Priority Area
- Anferara-Wadera National Forest Priority Area
- Arba-Minch National Forest Priority Area
- Arero National Forest Priority Area
- Babiya-Fola National Forest Priority Area
- Belete Gera National Forest Priority Area
- Bonga National Forest Priority Area
- Bore-Anferara National Forest Priority Area
- Bulki-Melakoza National Forest Priority Area
- Butajira National Forest Priority Area
- Chato-Sengi-Dengeb National Forest Priority Area
- Chilalo-Gallema National Forest Priority Area
- Chilimo-Gaji National Forest Priority Area
- Deme-Laha National Forest Priority Area
- Dengego-Melka Jedbu National Forest Priority Area
- Desa-A National Forest Priority Area
- Dindin-Arbagugu National Forest Priority Area
- Dire-Gerbicha National Forest Priority Area
- Dodola-Adaba-Lajo National Forest Priority Area
- Gara Muleta National Forest Priority Area
- Gebre Dima National Forest Priority Area
- Gedo National Forest Priority Area
- Gergeda National Forest Priority Area
- Gidole-Kemba National Forest Priority Area
- Godere National Forest Priority Area
- Goro-Bele National Forest Priority Area
- Gumburda-Grakaso National Forest Priority Area
- Gura Ferda National Forest Priority Area
- Harena-Kokosa National Forest Priority Area
- Jalo-Addes National Forest Priority Area
- Jarso-Gursum National Forest Priority Area
- Jibat National Forest Priority Area
- Jorgo-Wato National Forest Priority Area
- Kahatasa-Guangua National Forest Priority Area
- Komto-Waga-Tsige National Forest Priority Area
- Konchi National Forest Priority Area
- Kubayo National Forest Priority Area
- Megada National Forest Priority Area
- Mena-Angetu National Forest Priority Area
- Menagesha-Suba National Forest Priority Area
- Munesa-Shashemene National Forest Priority Area
- Negele (Mankubssa) National Forest Priority Area
- Sekela Mariam National Forest Priority Area
- Sele Anderacha National Forest Priority Area
- Sheka National Forest Priority Area
- Sibu-Tole-Kobo National Forest Priority Area
- Sigmo-Geba National Forest Priority Area
- Tiro-Boter-Becho National Forest Priority Area
- Wof-Washa National Forest Priority Area
- Yabelo National Forest Priority Area
- Yayu National Forest Priority Area
- Yegof-Erike National Forest Priority Area
- Yeki National Forest Priority Area
- Yerer National Forest Priority Area

== International designations ==
=== UNESCO-MAB Biosphere Reserves ===
- Kafa Biosphere Reserve
- Lake Tana Biosphere Reserve
- Majang Forest Biosphere Reserve
- Sheka Forest Biosphere Reserve
- Yayu Biosphere Reserve

=== World Heritage Sites ===
- Bale Mountains National Park
- Simien National Park

== See also ==
- Wildlife of Ethiopia
- Ministry of Culture and Tourism (Ethiopia)
