= World Network of Biosphere Reserves in Africa =

UNESCO Biosphere Reserves in Africa

Under UNESCO’s Man and the Biosphere Programme (MAB), there are 70 biosphere reserves recognized as part of the World Network of Biosphere Reserves in African states as of 2016. These are distributed across 28 countries. While biosphere reserves in West African, East African, Central African and Southern African countries are organised in the AfriMAB regional network, biosphere reserves in Northern African countries are organised in the ArabMAB, UNESCO's regional MAB network (see World Network of Biosphere Reserves in the Arab States for reserves in these countries).

== The list ==
Below is the list of biosphere reserves in Africa, organized by country/territory, along with the year these were designated as part of the World Network of Biosphere Reserves.

=== Benin ===
- Pendjari (1986)
- 'W' Region (2002, together with Burkina Faso and Niger)
- Mono River (2017, shared with Togo)

=== Burkina Faso ===
- Mare aux Hippopotames (1986)
- 'W' Region (2002, together with Benin and Niger)

=== Cameroon ===
- Waza (1979)
- Benoué (1981)
- Dja (1981)
- Takamanda – Cross River Gorilla (2026)

=== Central African Republic ===
- Basse-Lobaye (1977)
- Bamingui-Bangoran (1979)

=== Congo ===
- Odzala-Kokoua National Park
- Dimonika (1988)

=== Côte d'Ivoire ===
- Taï (1977)
- Comoé (1983)

=== Democratic Republic of the Congo ===
- Yangambi (1976)
- Luki (1976)
- Lufira (1982)

=== Egypt ===
- Omayed (1981, extension 1998)
- Wadi Allaqi (1993)

=== Ethiopia ===
- Kafa(2010)
- Yayu (2010)
- Sheka(2012)
- Lake Tana (2015)
- Majang Forest (2017)

=== Gabon ===
- Impassa-Makokou (1983)

=== Ghana ===
- Bia National Park (1983)
- Songor (2011)
- Lake Bosomtwe (2016)

=== Guinea ===
- Mount Nimba (1980)
- Massif du Ziama (1980)
- Badiar (2002)
- Haut Niger (2002)

=== Guinea-Bissau ===
- Boloma Bijagós (1996)

=== Kenya ===
- Mount Kenya (1978)
- Mount Kulal (1978)
- Malindi-Watamu (1979)
- Kiunga (1980)
- Amboseli (1991)
- Mount Elgon (2003)

=== Madagascar ===
- Mananara Nord National Park (1990)
- Sahamalaza-Iles Radama (2001)
- Littoral de Toliara (2003)

=== Malawi ===
- Mount Mulanje (2000)
- Lake Chilwa (2006)

=== Mali ===
- Boucle du Baoulé (1982)

=== Mauritania ===
- Sénégal River Delta (2005, together with Senegal)

=== Mauritius ===
- Macchabee/Bel Ombre (1977)

=== Morocco ===
- Arganeraie (1998)
- Oasis du sud marocain (2000)
- Intercontinental Biosphere Reserve of the Mediterranean (together with Spain) (2006)
- Atlas Cedar (2016)

=== Niger ===
- Aïr et Ténéré (1977)
- 'W' Region (2002, together with Benin and Burkina Faso)
- Gababedji (2017)

=== Nigeria ===
- Omo (1977)

=== Rwanda ===
- Volcans (1983)

=== São Tomé and Príncipe ===
- Island of Príncipe (2012)

=== Senegal ===
- Samba Dia (1979)
- Delta du Saloum (1980)
- Niokolo-Koba (1981)
- Sénégal River Delta (2005, together with Mauritania)
- Ferlo (2012)

=== South Africa ===

- Kogelberg Nature Reserve (1998)
- Cape West Coast (2000)
- Waterberg (2001)
- Kruger to Canyons Biosphere (2001)
- Cape Winelands Biosphere Reserve (2007)
- Vhembe Biosphere Reserve (2009) (ref Vhembe)
- Gouritz Cluster Biosphere Reserve (2015)
- Magaliesberg Biosphere Reserve (2015)
- Garden Route (2017)
- Marico Biosphere Reserve (2018)

=== Sudan ===
- Dinder (1979)
- Radom (1979)
- Jebel Dair (2017)

=== Togo ===
- Oti-Keran / Oti-Mandouri (2011)
- Mono River (2017, shared with Benin)

=== Uganda ===
- Queen Elizabeth (Rwenzori) (1979)
- Mount Elgon (2005)

=== Tanzania ===
- Lake Manyara (1981)
- Serengeti-Ngorongoro (1981)
- East Usambara (2000)
- Jozani-Chwaka Bay (2016)

=== Zimbabwe ===
- Middle Zambezi (2010)
