= East Atlantic Biosphere Reserve Network =

The East Atlantic Biosphere Reserve Network (REDBIOS) is an interregional network established in 1994 within UNESCO's Man and the Biosphere Programme (MAB). It connects biosphere reserves in the Macaronesian region and parts of West Africa, including the Canary Islands (Spain), the Azores and Madeira (Portugal), Cape Verde, Guinea-Bissau, Mauritania, Morocco, Senegal, and São Tomé and Príncipe. The network promotes cooperation and the exchange of knowledge and experience among biosphere reserves. Its activities focus on biodiversity conservation, the sustainable use of natural resources, environmental education, and sustainable development, particularly in island and coastal areas.

== History ==
The East Atlantic Biosphere Reserve Network (REDBIOS) was officially established in 1994 under the broader framework of the UNESCO Man and the Biosphere (MAB) Programme to foster comprehensive cooperation, biodiversity conservation, and sustainable development among various coastal and island regions located around the East Atlantic. Over the years, the network has evolved significantly through a series of collaborative international assemblies. Most importantly, it showed its ongoing approval at the eleventh REDBIOS meeting, where representatives from participating member states came together to set strategic priorities and create joint explanation aimed at addressing contemporary environmental issues. These continuous cooperation efforts are ultimately aimed at strengthening the management capacities of individual biosphere reserves, as well as promoting comprehensive scientific research, environmental education and basic information exchange between the interconnected ecosystems of the respective African and European countries.

== Objectives and activities ==
The East Atlantic Biosphere Reserve Network (REDBIOS) promotes cooperation among biosphere reserves, biodiversity conservation, environmental education, and sustainable development in island and coastal areas. It supports these goals through international meetings, knowledge-sharing, and collaborative projects. For example, at its eleventh meeting in Príncipe, São Tomé and Príncipe, in May 2013, participants discussed strengthening cooperation and promoting responsible tourism and sustainable resource management. In September 2014, the network held its twelfth meeting in the Azores, focusing on knowledge transfer and partnerships between biosphere reserves.

== Organization and cooperation ==
The REDBIOS network is coordinated through the collaboration of UNESCO's Man and the Biosphere (MAB) Secretariat and the Spanish Autonomous Body for National Parks (OAPN), with active involvement from national MAB committees and local biosphere reserve managers.

Cooperation among the member territories is maintained through regular regional meetings, thematic workshops, and technical exchange programmes hosted rotatively across member archipelagos and coastal areas.

== See also ==
- Man and the Biosphere Programme
- World Network of Biosphere Reserves
- World Network of Biosphere Reserves in Africa
- World Network of Biosphere Reserves in Europe and North America
