= Southeast Asian Biosphere Reserve Network =

Regional network of UNESCO biosphere reserves in Southeast Asia

- Type: Regional MAB Network
- Headquarters: Jakarta, Indonesia (UNESCO Regional Office)
- Website: www.unesco.org/en/fieldoffice/jakarta/science-network/about-seabrnet

The Southeast Asian Biosphere Reserve Network (SeaBRnet) is a regional collaborative platform established under UNESCO's Man and the Biosphere Programme (MAB). Founded in October 1998, the network promotes knowledge-sharing, research collaboration, and capacity-building among biosphere reserves across Southeast Asia. As of 2026, the network comprises 51 biosphere reserves across eight Southeast Asian nations.

== History ==
SeaBRnet was initiated in October 1998 under UNESCO's Man and the Biosphere Programme to address the unique ecological, geographical, and socio-economic characteristics of Southeast Asia a region recognized for its high biodiversity, extensive tropical rainforest and marine ecosystems, and dense human populations.

- Subsequent Expansion: Over the following decades, cooperation through the network grew to involve 10 participating countries: Cambodia, China, Indonesia, Japan, Lao PDR, Malaysia, Myanmar, the Philippines, Thailand, and Vietnam, focusing on transboundary conservation and sustainable resource management. Through regular regional meetings, capacity-building workshops, and joint research initiatives, the network continues to strengthen the management effectiveness of biosphere reserves, promoting them as premier learning sites for sustainable development throughout Southeast Asia.
- Recent Milestones: The network has continued its active regional collaboration through periodic meetings and virtual coordination (such as regional preparatory workshops leading up to the global MAB Congresses), reinforcing its role as a key platform for biodiversity protection and local livelihood resilience in Southeast Asia. Since its inception, SeaBRnet has served as a vital collaborative platform for countries across the region to share scientific knowledge, exchange best practices in site management, and tackle common environmental challenges such as habitat fragmentation, deforestation, climate change impacts, and balancing conservation with sustainable local livelihoods.

== Objectives and activities ==
SeaBRnet assists biosphere reserves in balancing biodiversity conservation with community-driven, sustainable economic development through local empowerment and regional cooperation. Its primary activities are structured around three core areas:

- Annual SeaBRnet Meetings: Regional assemblies that bring reserve managers, scientists, and stakeholders together to evaluate progress against global MAB strategies, exchange local case studies, and set strategic conservation priorities.
- Capacity-Building and Training Series: A practical learning program designed to upgrade reserve management capabilities across Southeast Asia. It includes hands-on technical workshops, peer case studies, and on-site field visits or virtual tours to observe reserve operations and community initiatives.
- Youth of SeaBRnet: A regional platform that supports youth participation in conservation and climate resilience through research grants (such as the MAB Young Scientists Awards), water resilience competitions, skill-building workshops, and project showcases.

== Organization and cooperation ==
The Secretariat of SeaBRnet is hosted by the UNESCO Regional Science Bureau for Asia and the Pacific, located in Jakarta, Indonesia. The network operates in partnership with National MAB Committees, local governments, academic institutions, and community stakeholders across its member countries.
