= Ethiopian Wildlife Conservation Authority =

Ethiopian government agency

- የኢትዮጵያ የዱር እንሰሳት ልማትና ጥበቃ ባለስልጣን

Agency overview
- Formed: 1964; 22 May 2008 (reestablished)
- Jurisdiction: Ethiopia
- Headquarters: Mexico Square, Addis Ababa, Ethiopia; 9.013°N 38.747°E
- Annual budget: 801.6 billion birr (2023/24)
- Agency executive: Kumara Wakijira, Director-general
- Parent department: Ministry of Tourism
- Website: www.ewca.gov.et

The Ethiopian Wildlife Conservation Authority (Amharic: የኢትዮጵያ የዱር እንሰሳት ልማትና ጥበቃ ባለስልጣን; EWCA) is an Ethiopian government agency responsible for wildlife conservation and management of protected areas in Ethiopia. Established in 1964, the agency is operated under Ministry of Tourism. In 2008, the institution was reestablished by Proclamation No. 575/2008.

Currently, Kumara Wakijira has been the director-general of EWCA.

== History ==
The Ethiopian Wildlife Conservation Authority (EWCA) was established in 1964 to manage and conserve protected areas and wildlife resources in Ethiopia. The agency is operated under Ministry of Tourism. On 22 May 2008 under Proclamation No. 575/2008, EWCA was formally reestablished.

In 1964-65, institutional management of wildlife conservation was under UNESCO mission direction. EWCA mission envisages to promote green economy and ecosystem development by 2030s.

== List of protected areas ==
- Simien Mountains National Park
- Awash National Park
- Borana National Park
- Bale Mountains National Park
- Chebera Churchura National Park
- Gambela National Park
- Abijatta-Shalla National Park
- Maze National Park
- Nechisar National Park

== See also ==
- Wildlife of Ethiopia
