= Sheka Forest =

Biosphere reserve in Southwest Ethiopia Regional State, Ethiopia

Coordinates: 7°33′50.11″N 35°24′12.71″E

The Sheka Forest is a UNESCO designated Biosphere Reserve in south western Ethiopia. The area includes forest, bamboo thickets, wetlands, agricultural land, rural settlements and towns. It covers a unique biogeographic unit extending from cold and very wet highlands to hot lowland areas. The diverse resident human population is committed to sustainable use of the forests through both the production of wooden items and non-timber forest products. It was declared in 2012 and is administered by SNNP Region Bureau of Agriculture, Sheka Zone Administration, Sheka Zone Department of Agriculture, Masha Woreda Office of Agriculture, Anderacha Woreda Office of Agriculture, Yeski Woreda Office of Agriculture. The reserve covers a core area of 238,750 hectares, with a buffer zone 76,395 hectares and transition areas of 107,100 hectares.

== Ecological characteristics ==
The forest in Sheka which is also part of the Southwest Highlands Forests of Ethiopia is important for the conservation of Afromontane forest vegetation types, especially the Afromontane Rainforest and Alpine Bamboo thickets. Afromontane forest vegetation has long been considered one of the most threatened eco-regions in the world.

The area is rich in plant and animal species. There are over 300 higher plants, 50 mammals, 200 birds, and 20 amphibian species occurring in all habitat types within the biosphere reserve. There are also many endemic species, at least 55 plants and 10 birds, and 38 threatened species of flora and fauna.

=== Flora ===
The characteristic species of the Afromontane rainforest are a mixture of broadleaved tree species and include: Aningeria adolfi-friederici, Syzygium guineense, Polyscias fulva, Olea welwitschii, Diospyros abyssinica, Manilkara butugi and Cordia africana. A discontinuous canopy of smaller trees (less than 10 m) include Allophylus abyssinicus, Chionanthus mildbraedii, Clausena anisata, Coffea arabica, and Deinbollia kilimandischarica. Native coffee is one of the characteristic species in the understory. The shrub layer includes Acanthus eminens, Dracaena fragrans, Lobelia giberroa, Senecio gigas, and others. Lianas and scrambling shrubs are numerous. Epiphytes are very common and include Canarina abyssinica, Scadox nutans, Peperomia tetraphylla, Asplenium sandersonii, Loxogramme lanceolata, different orchids, mosses, and others.

=== Fauna ===
In the Afromontane rainforest and transitional rainforest, animal species are varied and include a diverse range of invertebrates inhabiting all niches from the soil to high forest canopies and vertebrates including amphibians, reptiles, birds and small and large mammals. Common forest mammals and birds species in the area includes: porcupine, Chlorocebus (Cercopithecus aethiops), blue monkey (Cercopithecus mitis), De Brazza's monkey (Cercopithecus neglectus), baboon, African buffalo, lion, leopard, African civet (Civettictis civetta), Ethiopian hare (Lepus fagani), Abyssinian black-headed oriole (Oriolus monacha), Abyssinian ground hornbill (Bucorvus abyssinicus), Abyssinian woodpecker (Dendropicos abyssinicus), among others.

== Socio-economic characteristics ==
The ethnic composition of Sheka Zone is quite diverse today. Of the total population, the major ethnic groups are: 34.7% Shekacho, 20.5% Kafficho, 20.5% Amhara, 9.6% Oromo, 5.0% Sheko, 4.8% Bench, and 2% Mezengir.

The Sheka forests are sources of various direct uses for the local community. These include construction materials from climbers/liana, tree ferns (locally called Seseno), timber, fuel wood, logs for beehive construction, wood for utensils, bee forage and traditional hanging beehives, spice production and medicinal plants collection. The locally constructed wood products valued highly by the community include timber doors, windows, dining tables, chairs, benches, beehives, coffins, and raw timber for sale.

Non-timber forest products (NTFP) collected from the forest include medicinal plants, spices like Korerima and leaves of phoenix. In kebeles at lower elevations (<2000 m), coffee is becoming an important NTFP, next to honey. Fuel wood collection from the dense forest is common only in kebeles at higher elevations, where the settlement is close to the forest areas. Moreover, wild fruits are vital for the local communities not only because they eat them but the wild fruit also serves as food for wildlife and in turn save crops from wildlife.

The local population is deeply committed to maintaining the integrity of the ecosystem through the practice of ecologically sustainable agriculture.

== Sources ==
This article incorporates text from a free content work (license statement/permission). Text taken from UNESCO - MAB Biosphere Reserves Directory, UNESCO, UNESCO.
