= Canarina eminii =

Scientific classification
- Kingdom: Plantae
- Clade: Embryophytes
- Clade: Tracheophytes
- Clade: Spermatophytes
- Clade: Angiosperms
- Clade: Eudicots
- Clade: Asterids
- Order: Asterales
- Family: Campanulaceae
- Genus: Canarina
- Species: C. eminii

Binomial name
- Canarina eminii Asch. & Schweinf.

Synonyms
- Canarina elegantissima T.C.E.Fr.

Species of flowering plant

Canarina eminii is a species of flowering plant in the family Campanulaceae. It is an epiphytic or terrestrial, usually glaucous, herb. Its root is thick, often with a corky surface layer. Its stems are erect and scandent, pendent up to several meters in length, usually with a fine purplish mottling. Its leaves are triangular to ovate, up to 10 cm (3.9 in) long, acute with cordate to cuneate base, dentate, double dentate or double serrate. Its corollas are funnel-shaped to 7.5 cm (3.0 in) long, orange to orange-red with darker venation.

== Distribution ==
It is found in upland and riverine forest, epiphytic or among rocks; altitude range 1,600–3,200 m (5,200–10,500 ft). Very similar to C. abyssinica which is not epiphytic and has a slightly lower altitude range. It also lacks the purplish mottling of C. eminii and the leaves are triangular to pentagonal. Kenya: Keiyo, recorded in Elgon, Cheranganis, Tinderet, Mau, the Aberdares and Mount Kenya. Tanzania: recorded in Rungwe, Kiwira Forest. Uganda: recorded in Imatong Mountains and Mbale. Also recorded in Ethiopia, eastern Congo, Rwanda, Burundi and Malawi.

== Sources ==
- Collins Guide to the Wildflowers of East Africa by Sir Michael Blundell, 1987. ISBN 0-00-219812-6
- Upland Kenya Wild Flowers and Ferns by A.D.Q. Agnew, 2013. ISBN 9966-761-17-9
- http://www.theplantlist.org/tpl/search?q=canarina
