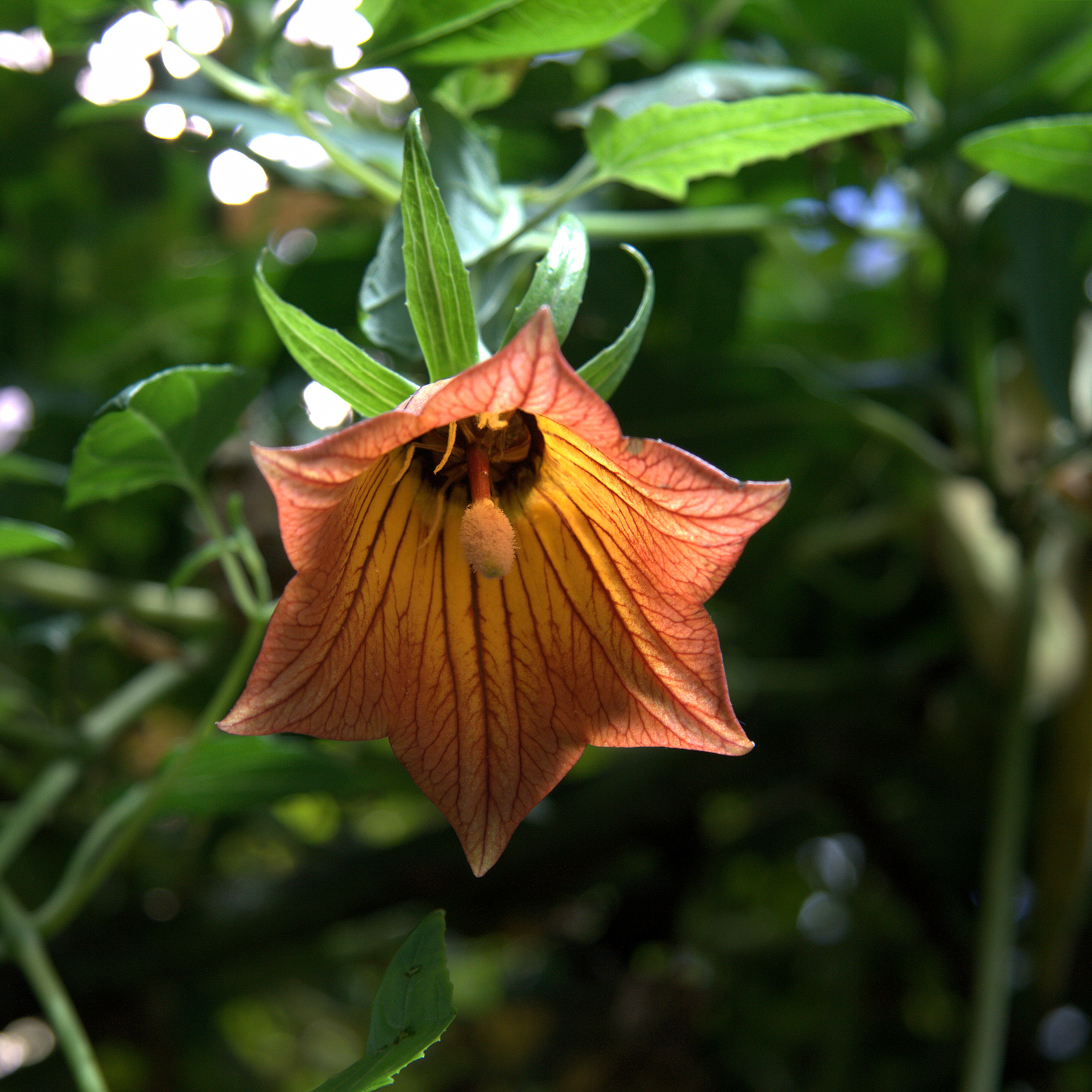
- Canarina canariensis

Scientific classification
- Kingdom: Plantae
- Clade: Tracheophytes
- Clade: Angiosperms
- Clade: Eudicots
- Clade: Asterids
- Order: Asterales
- Family: Campanulaceae
- Subfamily: Campanuloideae
- Genus: Canarina; L.

Species
- See text

= Canarina =

Genus of flowering plants in the bellflower family

Canarina is a genus of flowering plants within the family Campanulaceae. They are herbaceous perennial vines with bell-shaped flowers. The best known species is Canarina canariensis from the laurel forests of the Canary Islands which is grown as an ornamental plant. C. canariensis is one of a group of unrelated Canarian plants that appear to be adapted for bird pollination, including the members of the genera Isoplexis and Lotus. It was once thought that the original pollinators of these plants were sunbirds which had become extinct on the Canary Islands, explaining why some of these species are rare and considered endangered (Vogel 1954; Vogel et al. 1984; Olesen 1985; Valido et al. 2004). However more recent work has shown that these plants are adequately pollinated by non-specialist flower visiting birds, particularly the Canary Islands chiffchaff (Phylloscopus canariensis) and the Canary Island spectacled warbler (Sylvia conspicillata orbitalis) (Olesen 1985; Ollerton et al. 2008), and in fact show some specific adaptations to infrequent pollination by these birds, such as extended flower lifespans (Ollerton et al. 2008), and a hexose-dominated sugar ratio of the nectar (Dupont et al. 2004).

In frost-prone areas, Canarina canariensis is best grown under glass in the winter. It has gained the Royal Horticultural Society's Award of Garden Merit.

== Species ==
Species include:

Image	Scientific name	Distribution
	Canarina abyssinica Engl.	Ethiopia
	Canarina canariensis (L.) Vatke (Canary Island bellflower)	Canary Islands
	Canarina eminii Asch. ex Schweinf.	tropical areas in East Africa
