= Maze National Park =

National park in South Ethiopia Regional State, Ethiopia

- IUCN category II (national park)
- Location within Ethiopia
- Location: Gamo Gofa Zone, South Ethiopia Regional State, Ethiopia
- Nearest city: Arba Minch
- Coordinates: 6°25′N 37°14′E
- Area: 210 km^{2} (81 sq mi)
- Established: 2005
- Governing body: Ethiopian Wildlife Conservation Authority

Maze National Park is a national park in the South Ethiopia Regional State of Ethiopia. It is located 460 km (290 mi) southwest of Addis Ababa and 248 km (154 mi) from Hawassa. It covers approximately 210 km^{2} (81 sq mi). Maze was founded in 2005 and is managed by the Ethiopian Wildlife Conservation Authority.

== History ==
The park drives its name after Maze River that transverses through its length. The park was established in 2005. Maze Park served as a hunting area for Swayne's hartebeest and Buffalo.

== Geography ==
Elevations within the park range between 1,000 and 1,200 m (3,300 and 3,900 ft) above sea level. rainy seasons extend from March to September with estimated range from 800 to 1,600 mm (31 to 63 in) per annum. Mount Gughe, which rises to 4,200 m (13,800 ft) above sea level is found on the boundary of the park. Bilbo hot springs found, at the upper parts of Maze River, in the park's southern parts, has geysers that spout steam into the air. There are natural stone caves in the park called Wonja stone caves. This natural stone cave holds up to 300 people.

== Wildlife ==
=== Flora ===
The maze national park is covered by savannah grassland with scattered deciduous board leaf trees. The park is filled with different type of vegetation that grow on in different altitudes in various areas of the park. Some of the vegetations that grow in the park are the Bush land vegetation, wood land vegetation, Savannah Grassland and the riverine forest.

=== Fauna ===
Maze National Park is home to 37 species of mammals and 196 species of birds. The park is noted for its population of the endangered Swayne's hartebeest (Alcelaphus buselaphus swaynei), and is said to be second only to Senkelle Swayne's Hartebeest Sanctuary in importance for that subspecies. There are about 300 to 1000 hartebeest individuals in the park. Other commonly observed species include African buffalo, olive baboons, lions, leopards, vervet monkeys, oribi, Bohor reedbuck, waterbuck, Cape bushbuck, lesser and greater kudu, Northeast African cheetahs, warthogs, servals, and bushpigs.
