= Wildlife of Ethiopia =

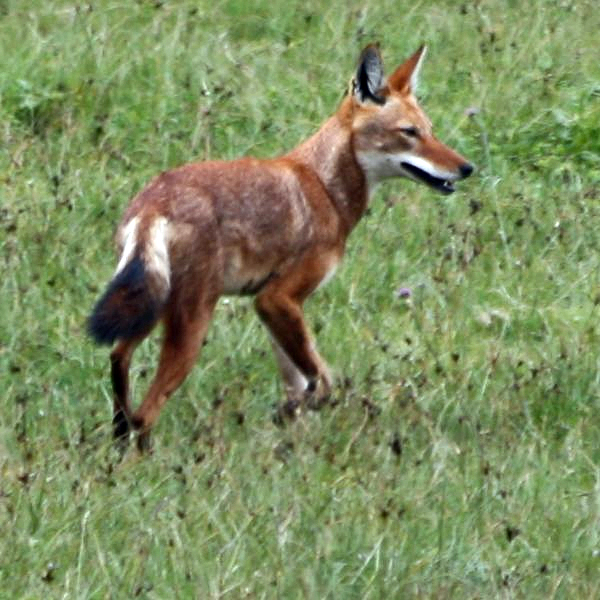
The Ethiopian wolf

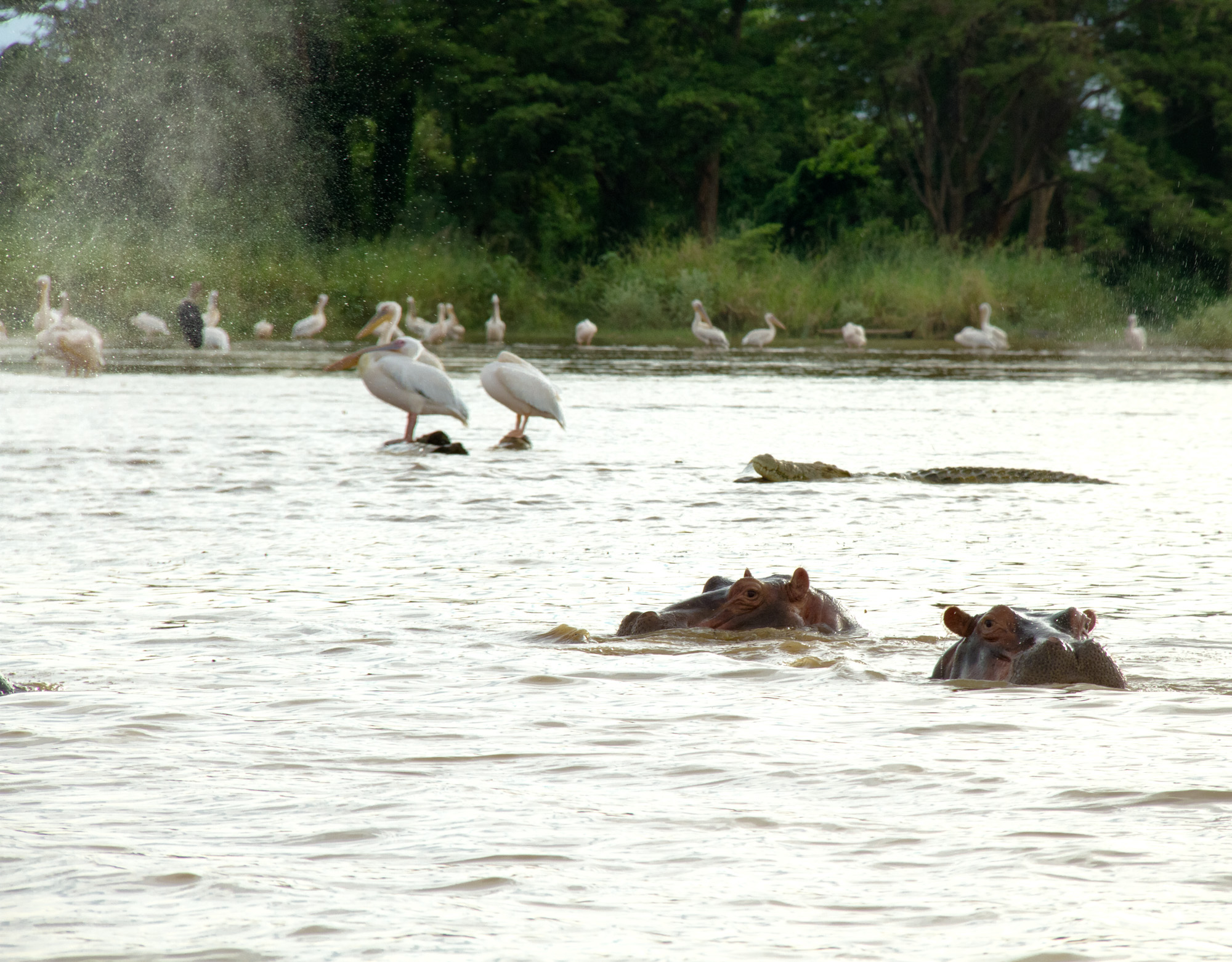
Lake Chama wildlife

The richness and variety of the wildlife of Ethiopia is dictated by the great diversity of terrain with wide variations in climate, soils, natural vegetation and settlement patterns. Ethiopia contains a vast highland complex of mountains and dissected plateaus divided by the Great Rift Valley, which runs generally southwest to northeast and is surrounded by lowlands, steppes, or semi-desert. The Ethiopian Wildlife Conservation Authority (EWCA) is the governing body of wildlife conservation and management.

Ethiopia is an ecologically diverse country, ranging from the deserts along the eastern border to the tropical forests in the south to extensive Afromontane in the northern and southwestern parts. Lake Tana in the north is the source of the Blue Nile. It also has many endemic species, including 31 mammal species, notably the gelada, the walia ibex and the Ethiopian wolf ("Simien fox"). There are seven mammal species classified as "critically endangered", and others as "endangered" or "vulnerable". The wide range of altitude has given the country a variety of ecologically distinct areas, and this has helped to encourage the evolution of endemic species in ecological isolation. But some of these habitats are now much reduced or threatened.

The nation is a land of geographical contrasts, ranging from the vast fertile west, with its forests and numerous rivers, to the world's hottest settlement of Dallol in its north. The Ethiopian Highlands are the largest continuous mountain ranges in Africa, and the Sof Omar Caves contains the largest cave on the continent. Ethiopia also has the second-largest number of UNESCO World Heritage Sites in Africa.

== Fauna ==
=== Mammals ===
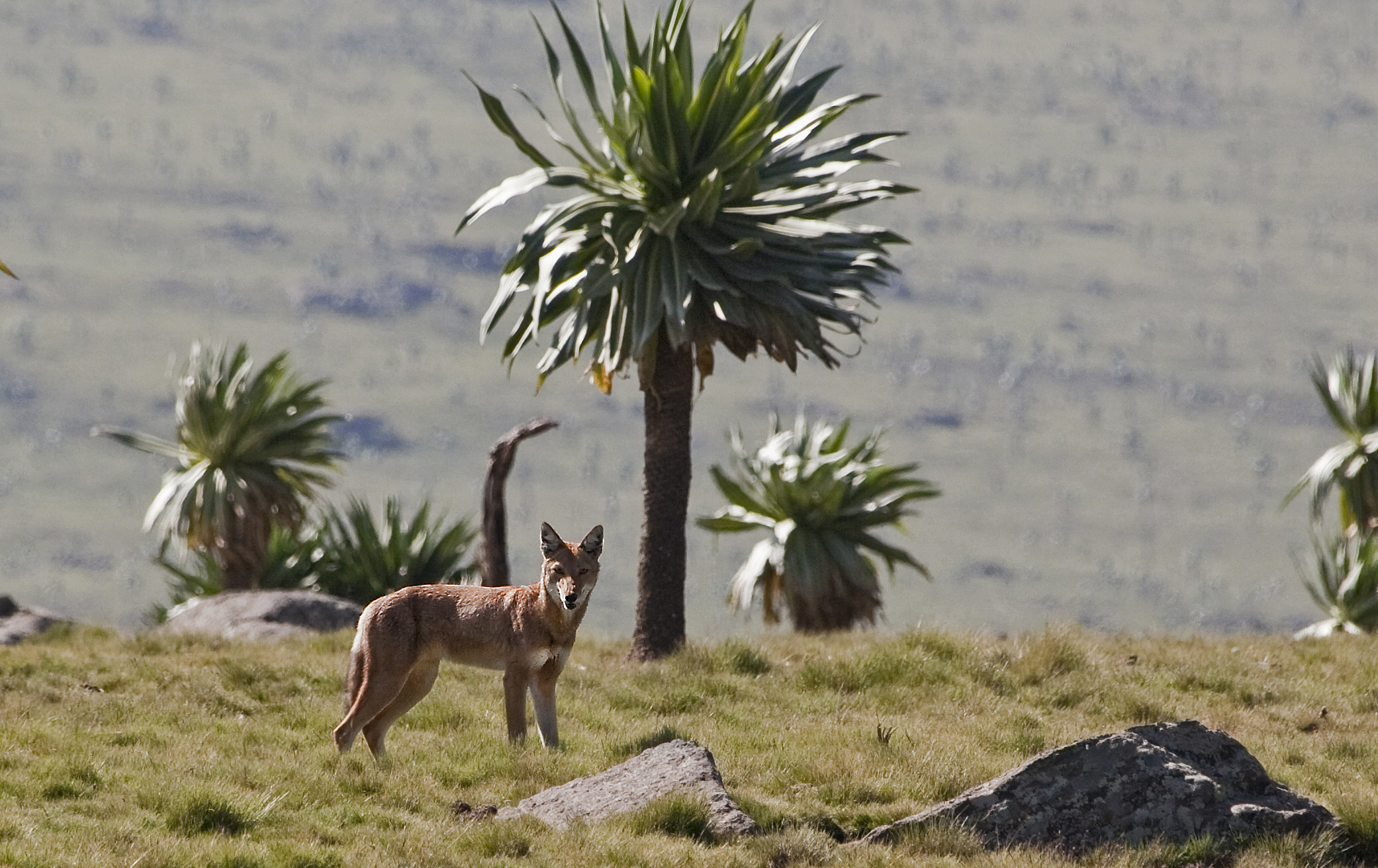
Ethiopian wolf

=== Fish ===
About 14 genera of fishes are found. These include primitive bichirs, lung fishes, catfish, cyprinids, cyprinodonts, cichlids, several caracins and a few spiny rayed families. The following fish families are most peculiar of this region:

- Polypteridae: protopterus (lung fish) related to lepidosiren (Neotropical lung fish)
- Mormyridae or African electric fishes, not related to Gymnotidae (Neotropical electric fishes)
- Archaic bichirs
- Gymnorchidae
- Isopondyli fishes
- catfishes

=== Butterflies ===
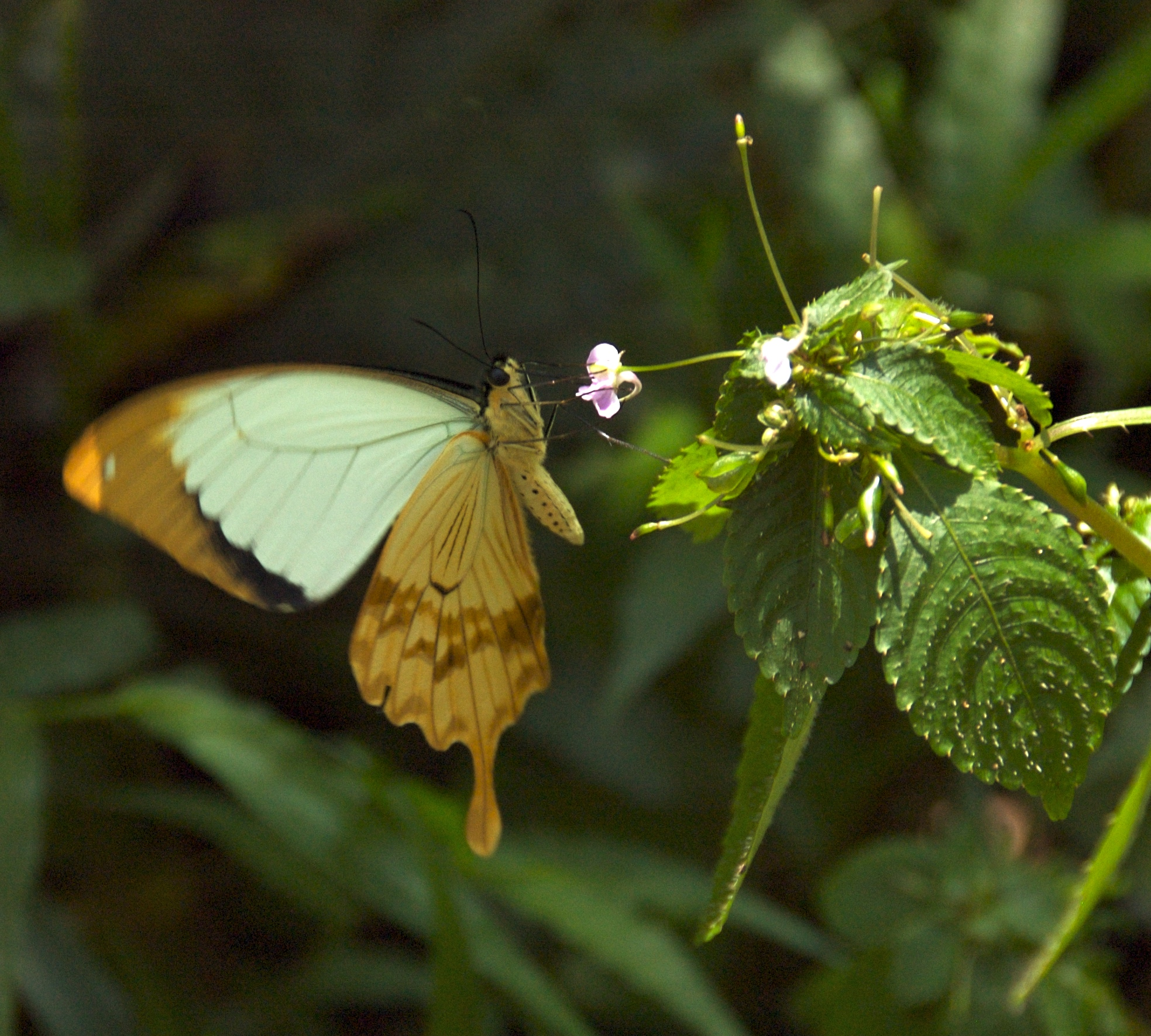
A Swallowtail butterfly at Lake Tana

=== Reptiles ===
- Crocodylus niloticus, Nile crocodile
- Rhinotyphlops somalicus, Ethiopian blind snake
- Homopholis fasciata, Banded velvet gecko
- Pelusios adansonii, Adanson's mud turtle
- Bitis arietans, Puff adder
- Dendroaspis polylepis, Black mamba
- Bitis parviocula, Ethiopian mountain adder
- Lamprophis abyssinicus, Abyssinian house snake
- Python sebae sebae, African rock python

=== Threatened species ===
Historically, throughout the African continent, wildlife populations have been rapidly declining owing to logging, civil wars, hunting, pollution, poaching and other human interference. A 17-year-long civil war along with severe drought, negatively impacted Ethiopia's environmental conditions leading to even greater habitat degradation. Habitat destruction is a factor that leads to endangerment. When changes to a habitat occur rapidly, animals do not have time to adjust. Human impact threatens many species, with greater threats expected as a result of climate change-induced by greenhouse gas emissions.

Ethiopia has a large number of species listed as critically endangered, endangered and vulnerable by the IUCN. To assess the current situation in Ethiopia, it is critical to identify the threatened species in this region.

Critically endangered mammals	Endangered mammals	Vulnerable mammals		
African wild dog	African elephant	Large-eared free-tailed bat	Red-fronted gazelle	
Black rhinoceros	Ethiopian wolf	Ammodile	Lesser horseshoe bat	Rupp's mouse
Guramba shrew	Grévy's zebra	Bailey's shrew	Lion	Scott's mouse-eared bat
Harenna shrew	Giraffe	Bale shrew	Moorland shrew	Soemmerring's gazelle
MacMillan's shrew	Bushbuck	Beira antelope	Morris's bat	Speke's gazelle
Somali wild ass	Mountain nyala	Cheetah	Mouse-tailed bat species	Spotted-necked otter
Tora hartebeest	Nubian ibex	Dibatag	Natal free-tailed bat	Ethiopian striped mouse
	Swayne's hartebeest	Dorcas gazelle	Nikolaus's mouse	Walia ibex
		Glass's shrew	Patrizi's trident leaf-nosed bat	

There are 31 endemic species of mammals, meaning that a species occurs naturally only in a certain area, in this case Ethiopia. The African wild dog prehistorically had widespread distribution in Ethiopia; however, with last sightings at Fincha, this canid is thought to be potentially extirpated within Ethiopia. The Ethiopian wolf is perhaps the most researched of all the endangered species within Ethiopia. This, however, is likely not the case as a breeding pack has been seen, and photographed by Bale Mountain Lodge guests inside the park's Harenna Forest in 2015.

Several conservation programs are in effect to help endangered species in Ethiopia. A group was created in 1966 called The Ethiopian Wildlife and Natural History Society, which focuses on studying and promoting the natural environments of Ethiopia along with spreading the knowledge they acquire, and supporting legislation to protect environmental resources.

There are multiple conservation organizations one can access online, one of which connects directly to the Ethiopian wolf. Funding supports the World Wildlife Fund's global conservation efforts. The WWF Chairman of the Board, Bruce Babbitt holds this organization accountable for the best practices in accountability, governance and transparency throughout all tiers within the organization.

== Flora ==
There are many types of vegetation, flowers, and plants in Ethiopia. There are many cactus plants that grow in Ethiopian high lands. Ethiopia has many species of flowers that are used for medication and decoration. Many of the plants are used to make honey and oil. Moreover, many of the floras in Ethiopia can be used flavoring or spice. Ethiopia has different climate and geological zones that provide different types floras. There are different alpines and evergreen floras. There are some plants that Ethiopia exports to other countries like coffee and Kat which is significant to their economy.
