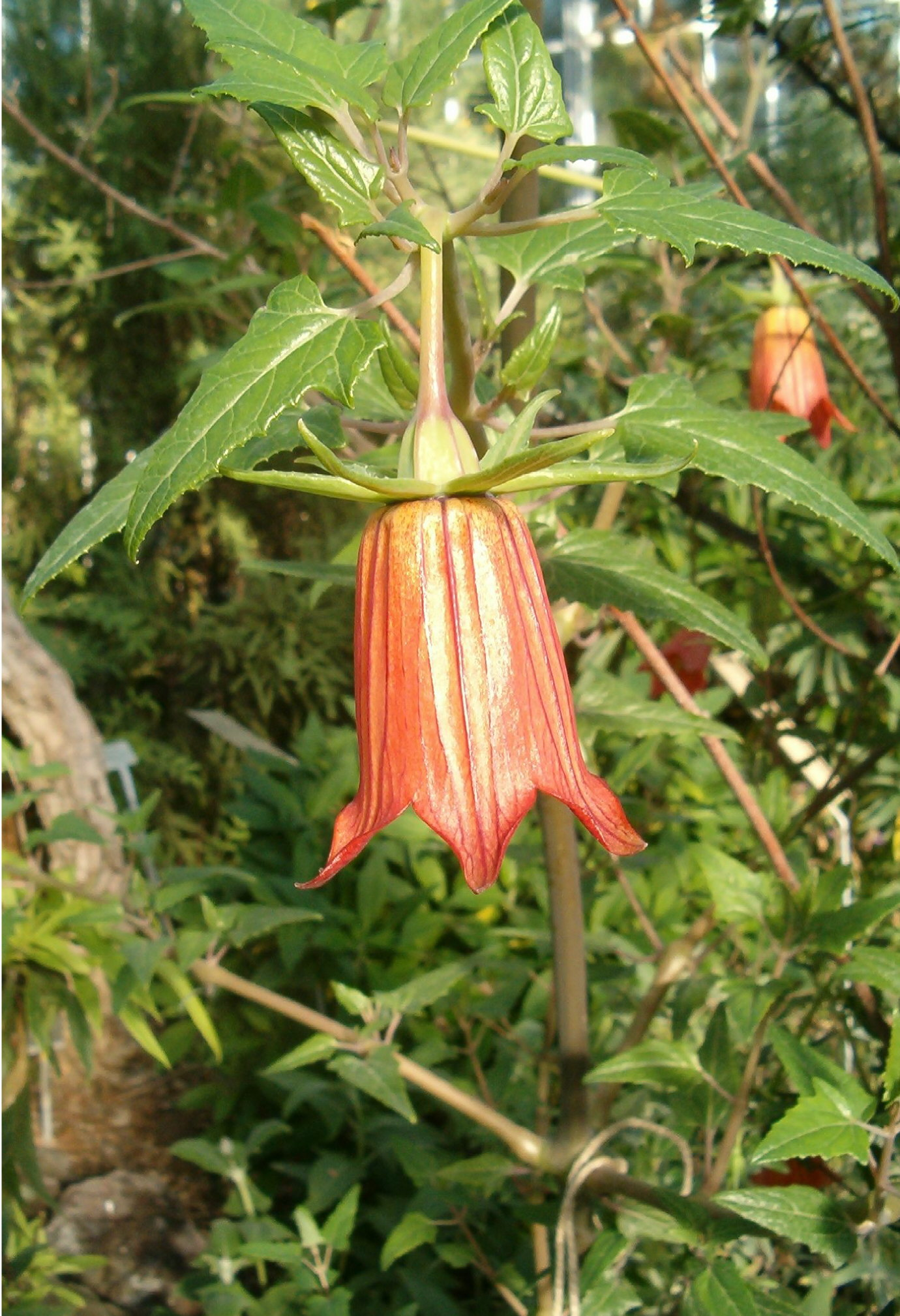

Scientific classification
- Kingdom: Plantae
- Clade: Tracheophytes
- Clade: Angiosperms
- Clade: Eudicots
- Clade: Asterids
- Order: Asterales
- Family: Campanulaceae
- Genus: Canarina
- Species: C. canariensis

Binomial name
- Canarina canariensis L. Vatke

= Canarina canariensis =

Species of flowering plant in the bellflower family

Canarina canariensis is a species of flowering plant in the bellflower family Campanulaceae, commonly known as the Canary Island bellflower, and known locally as bicácaro.

== Description ==
It is a scrambling herbaceous perennial with glabrous (smooth), glaucous (grey-green) leaves, The leaves are opposite, petiolate, triangular or hastate with dentate margins. Latex is present. There are no stipules. Flowers are axillary, solitary, bell-shaped, 3–6 cm long, orange (darkening when dried). It has a thick tuberous root, from which hollow, scrambling stems about 3 m are produced each year.

The fruit is a large ovate, fleshy berry, orange when ripe, and edible.

The species is bird pollinated by passerine species such as the chiffchaff.

== Distribution ==
Canarina canariensis is endemic to the Canary Islands.

- Tenerife: Frequent in laurel forests and forest margins, Anaga region, north coast from Orotava to Los Silos 300–1000 m, local in the south of the island.
- Gran Canaria: Los Tiles de Moya, frequent in the laurel woods, very depleted in other localities near San Mateo, Santa Brigida, Pino Santo, Teror etc.
- La Palma: Mazo, Los Tilos, Barranco Nogales etc., open areas in laurel forests or forest relicts.
- La Gomera: Rare in the forest regions.
- El Hierro: Frontera, las Playas etc.

== Cultivation ==
This species is valued in cultivation for its scrambling habit and attractive deep orange bell flowers. As it does not tolerate temperatures below 0 °C (32 °F), in temperate regions it must be grown under glass. It can be expected to reach 1.5 metres (4.9 ft) in height. In cultivation in the UK it has gained the Royal Horticultural Society's Award of Garden Merit.

== Gallery ==
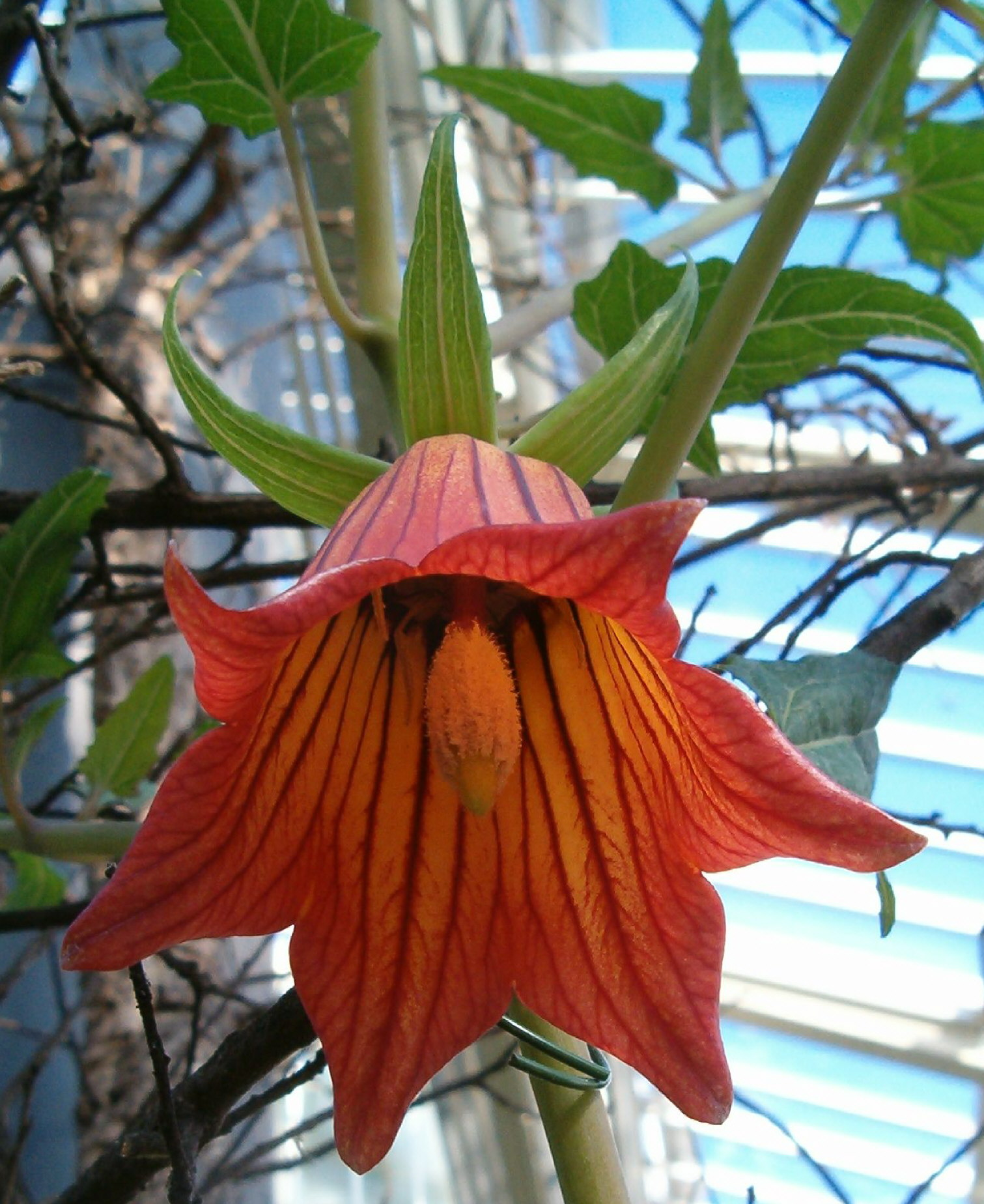

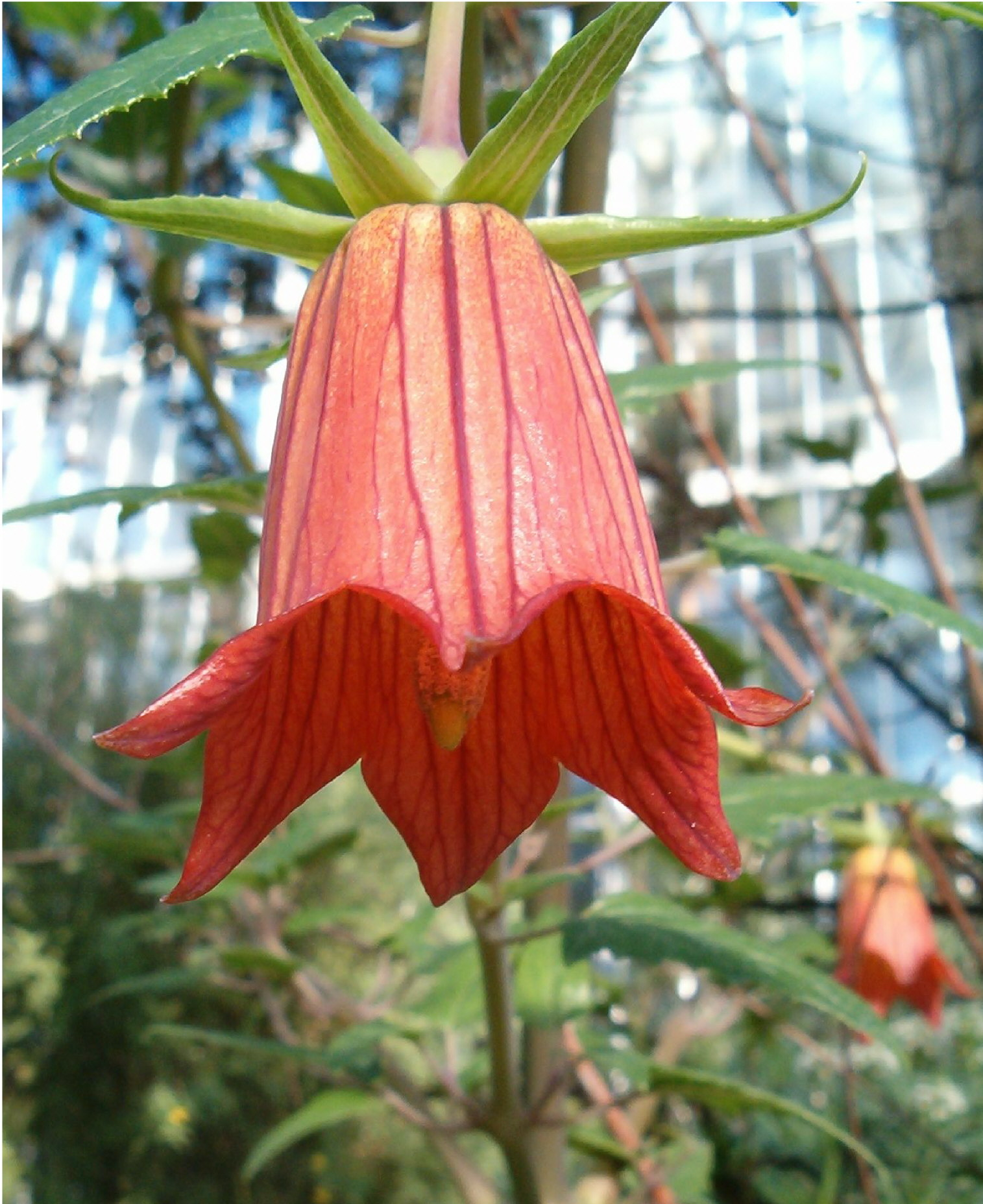

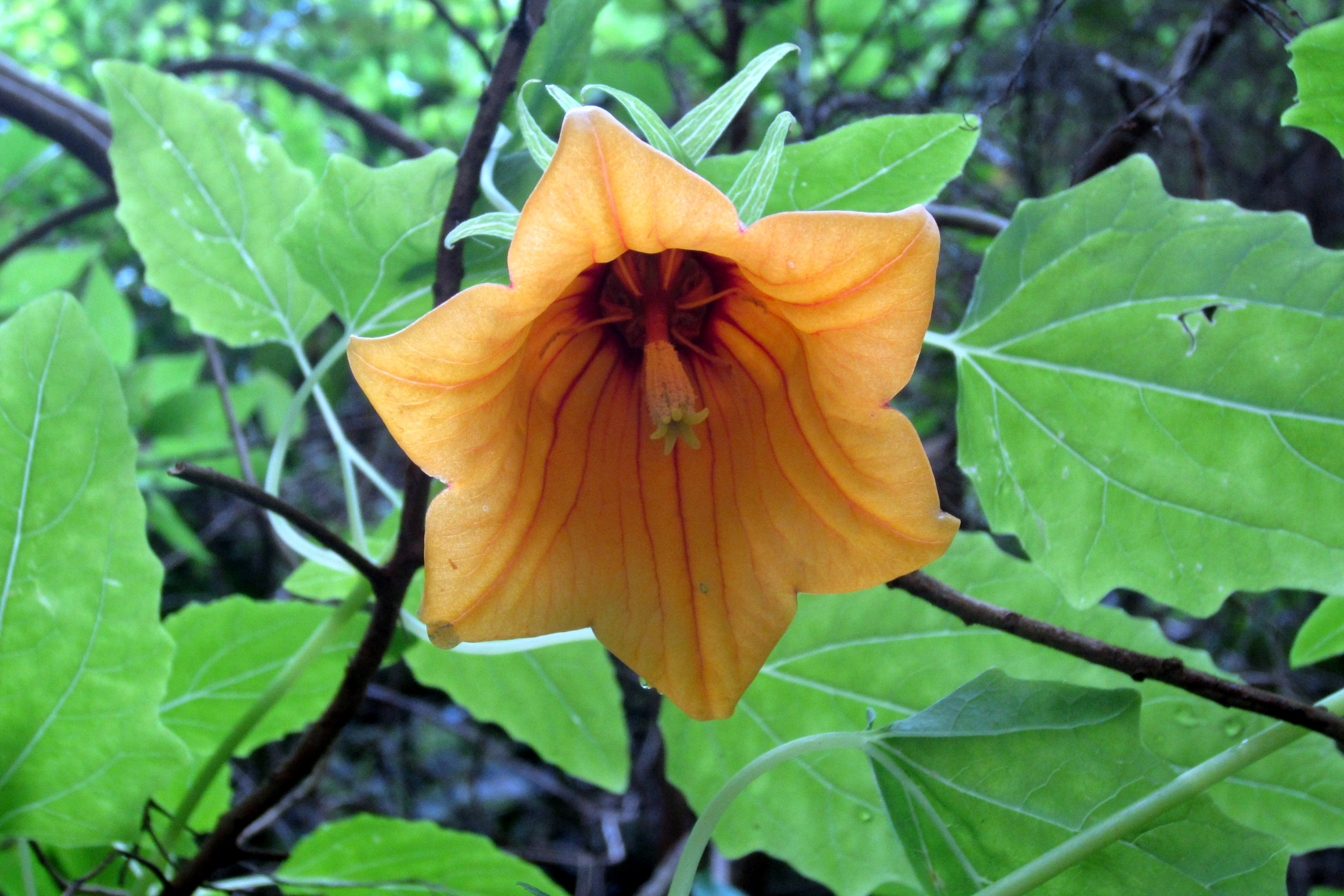

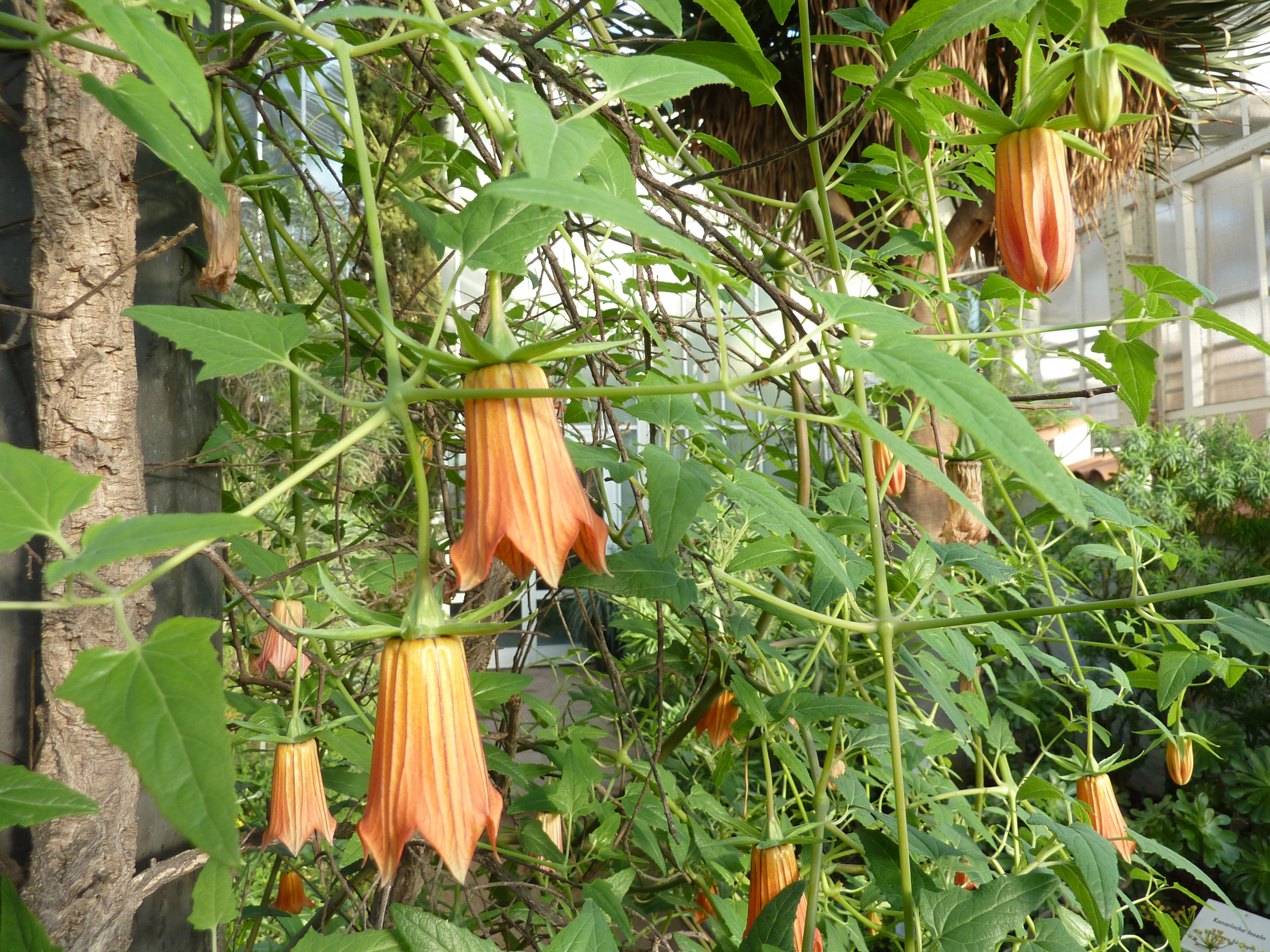

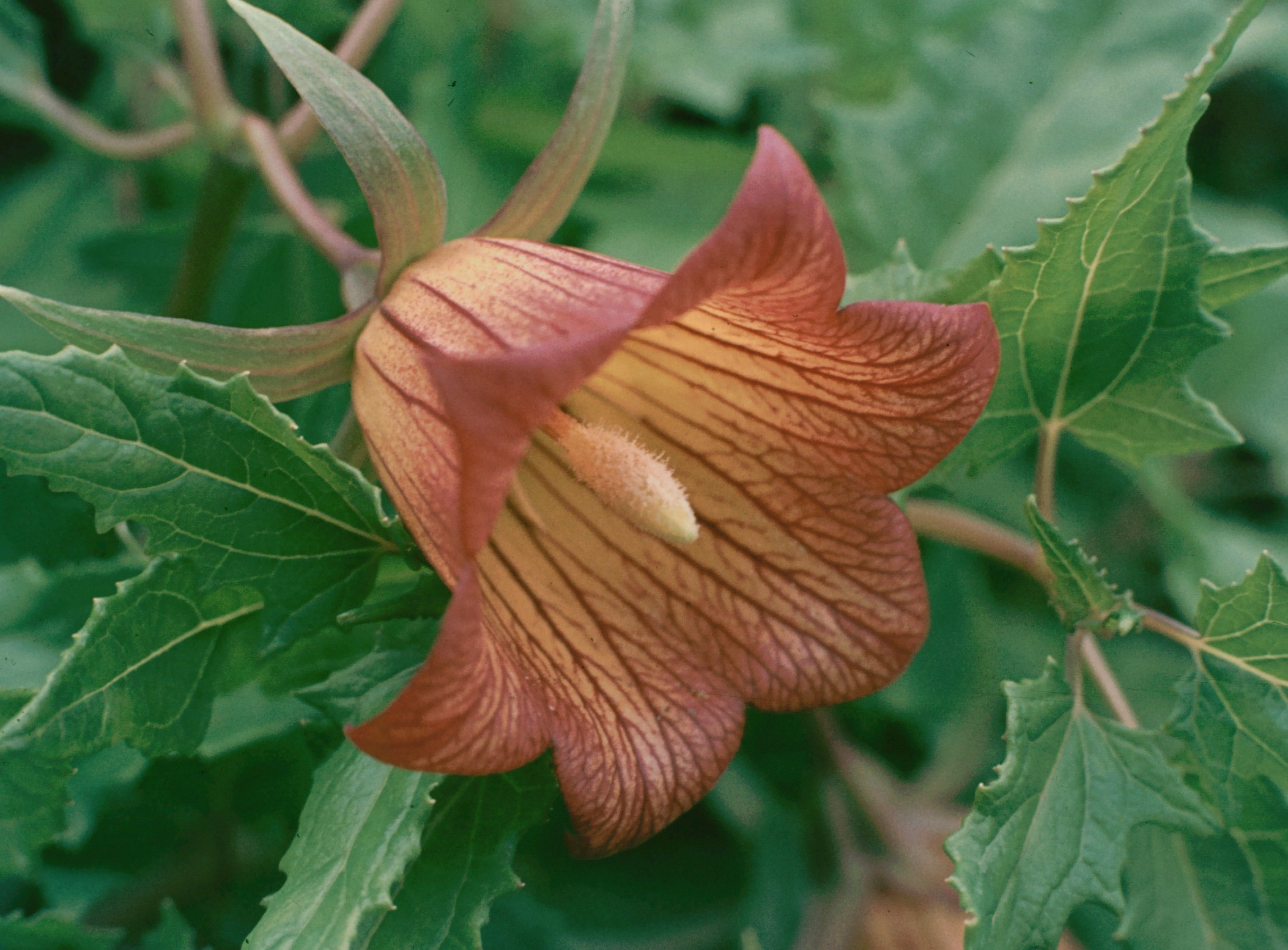

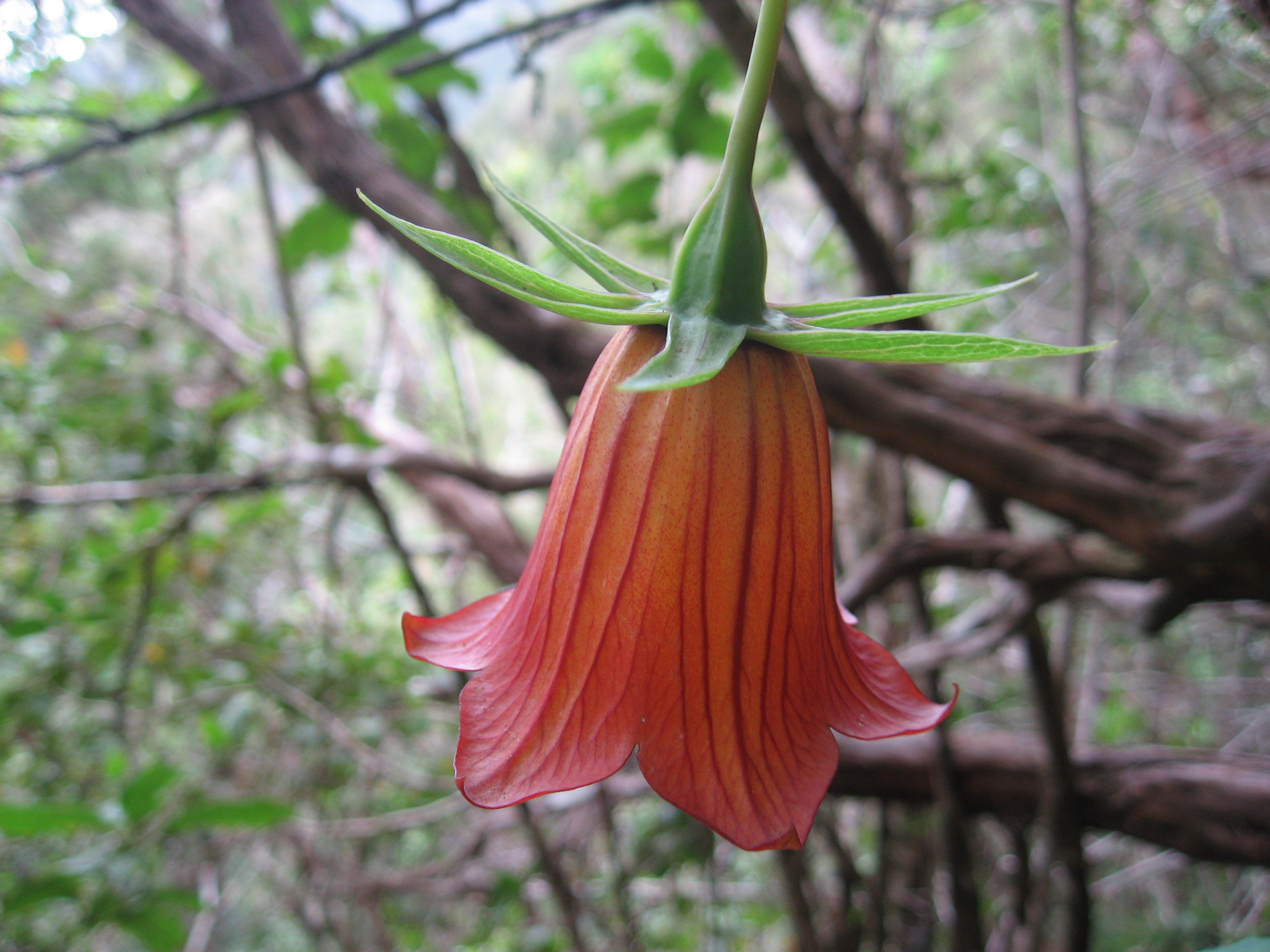

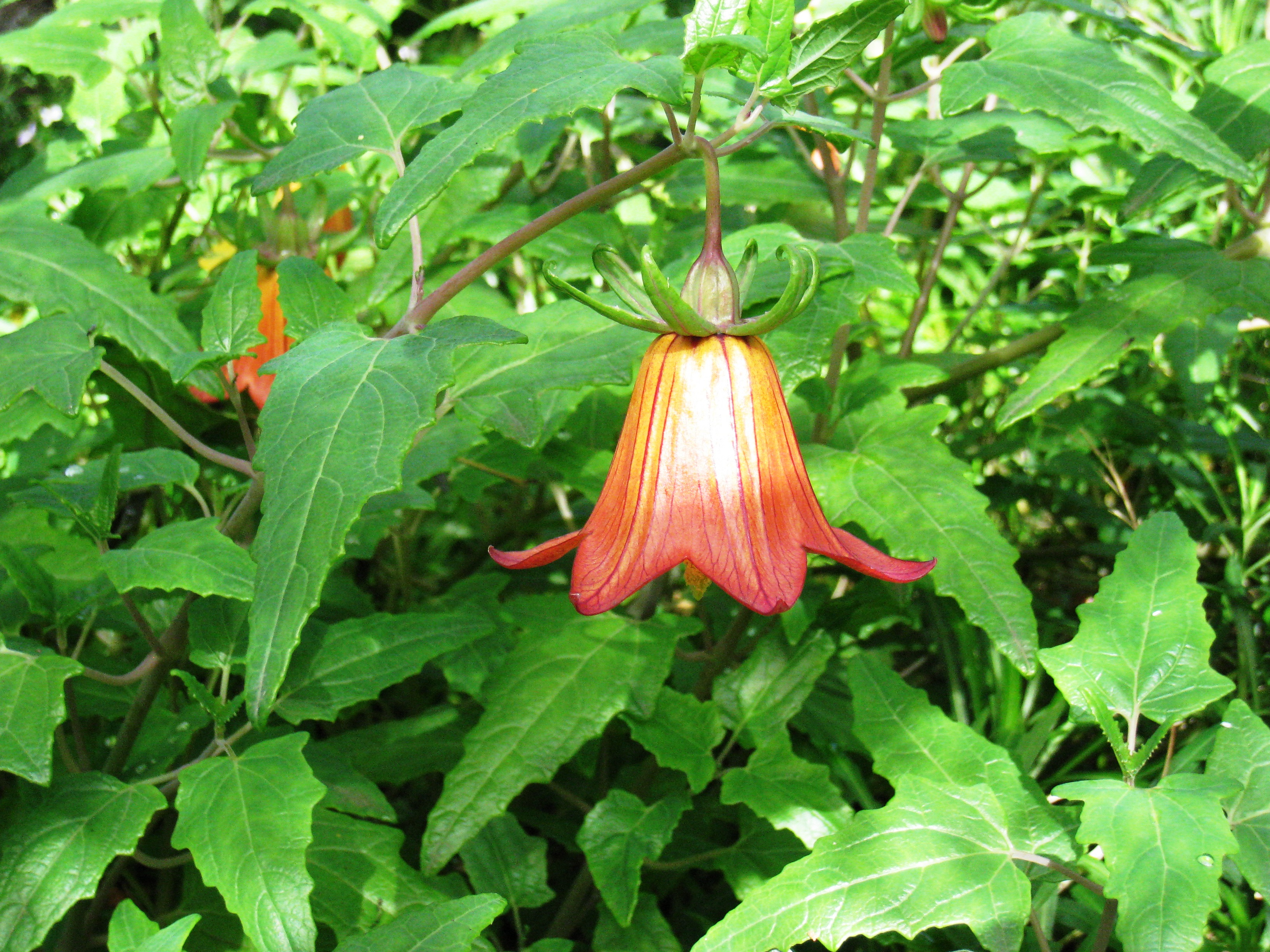

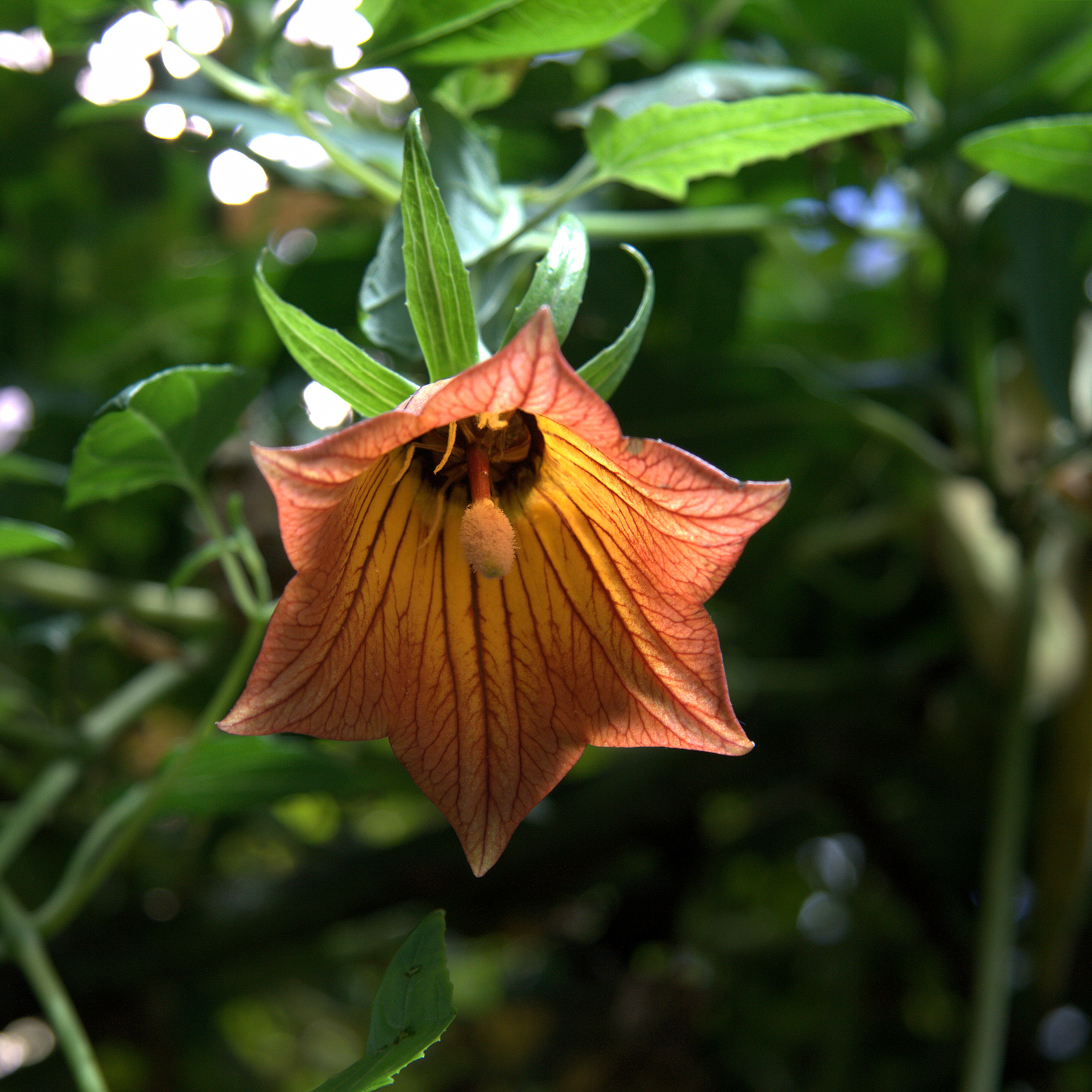

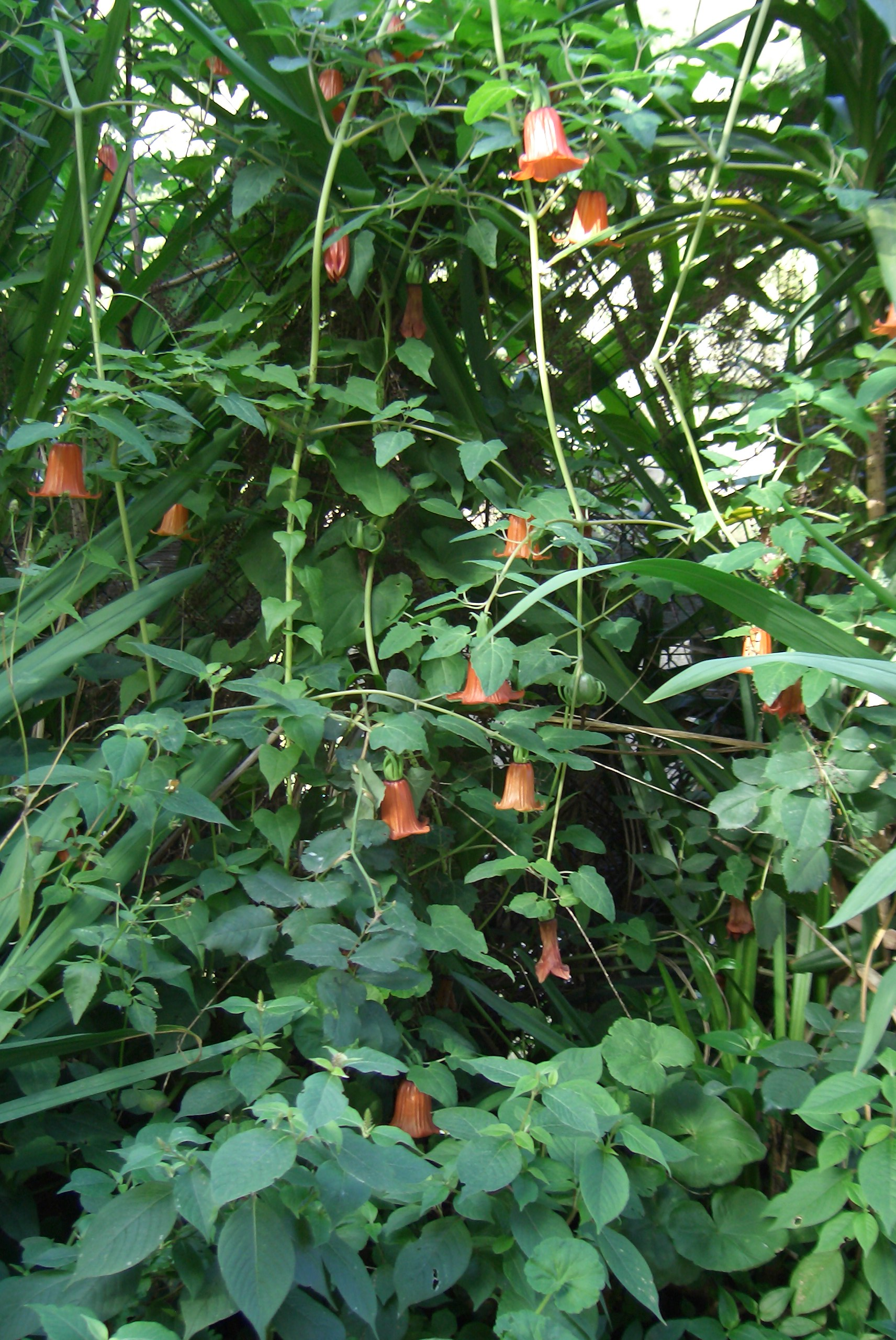

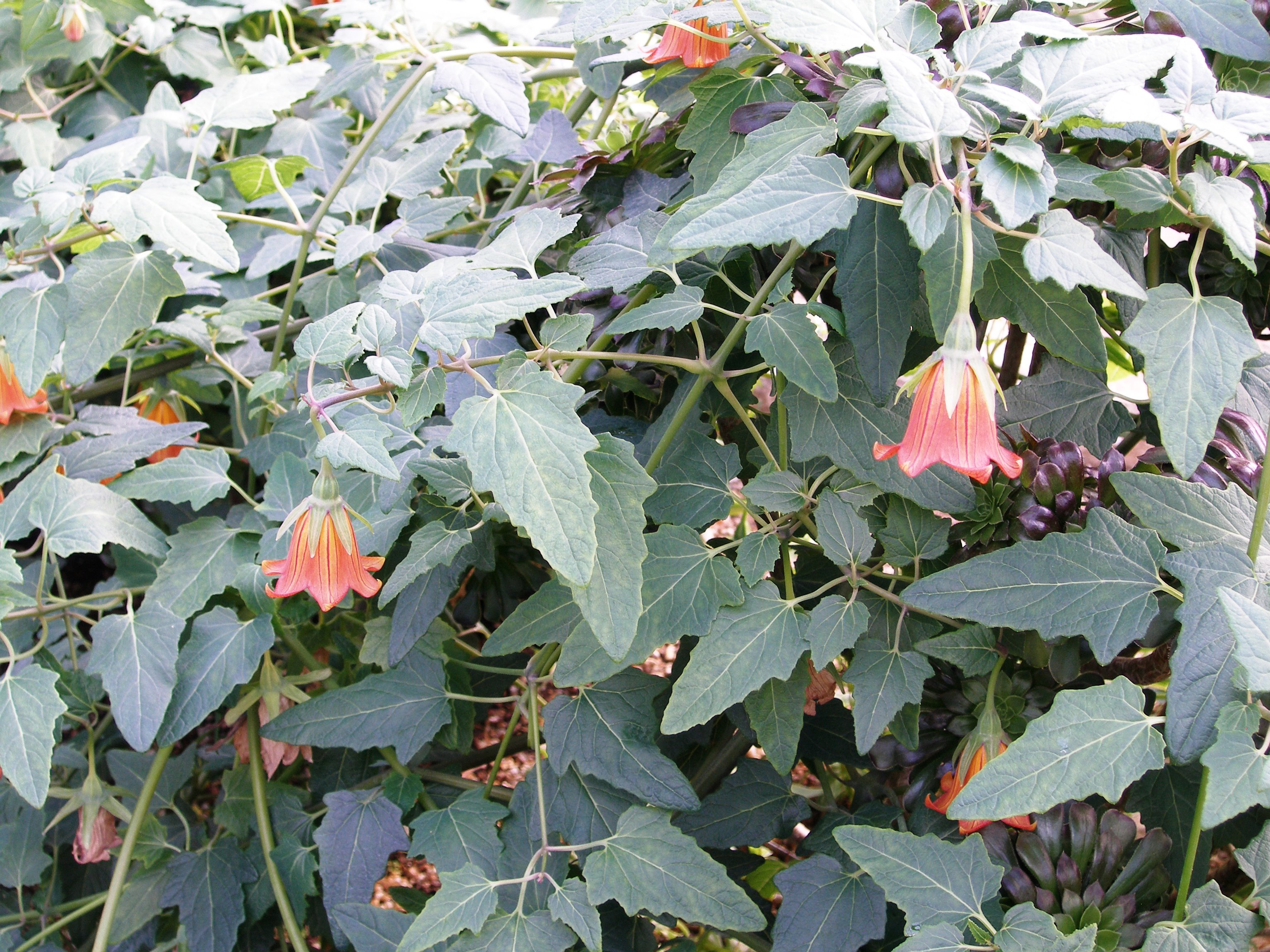

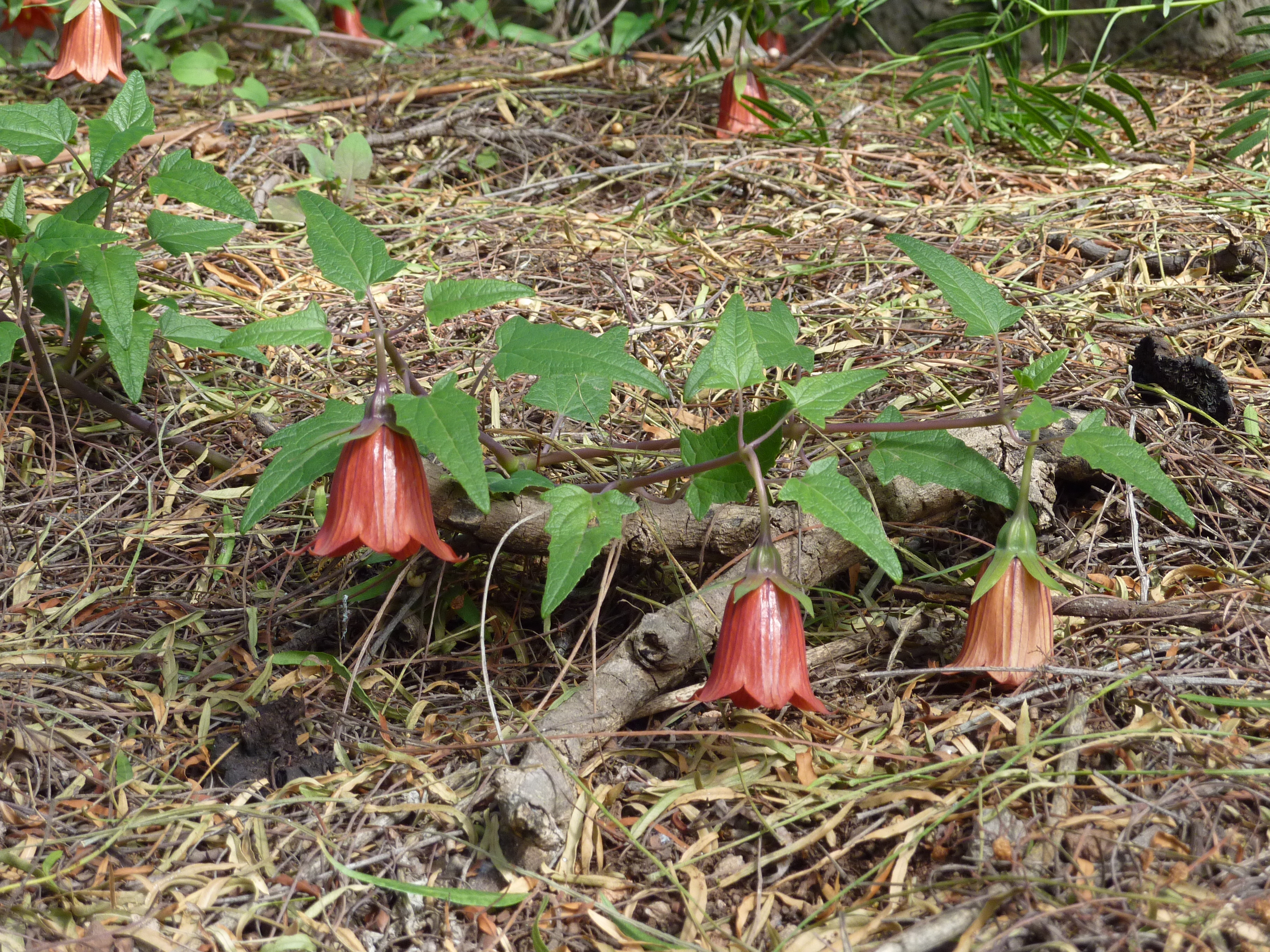

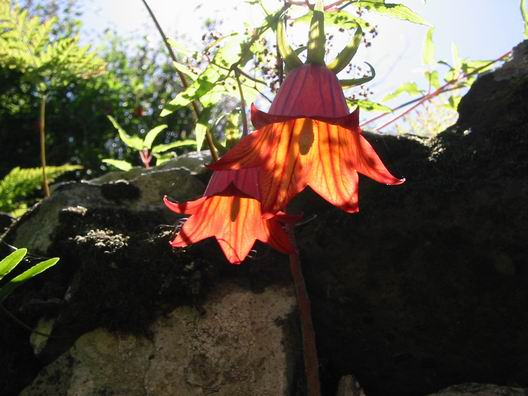

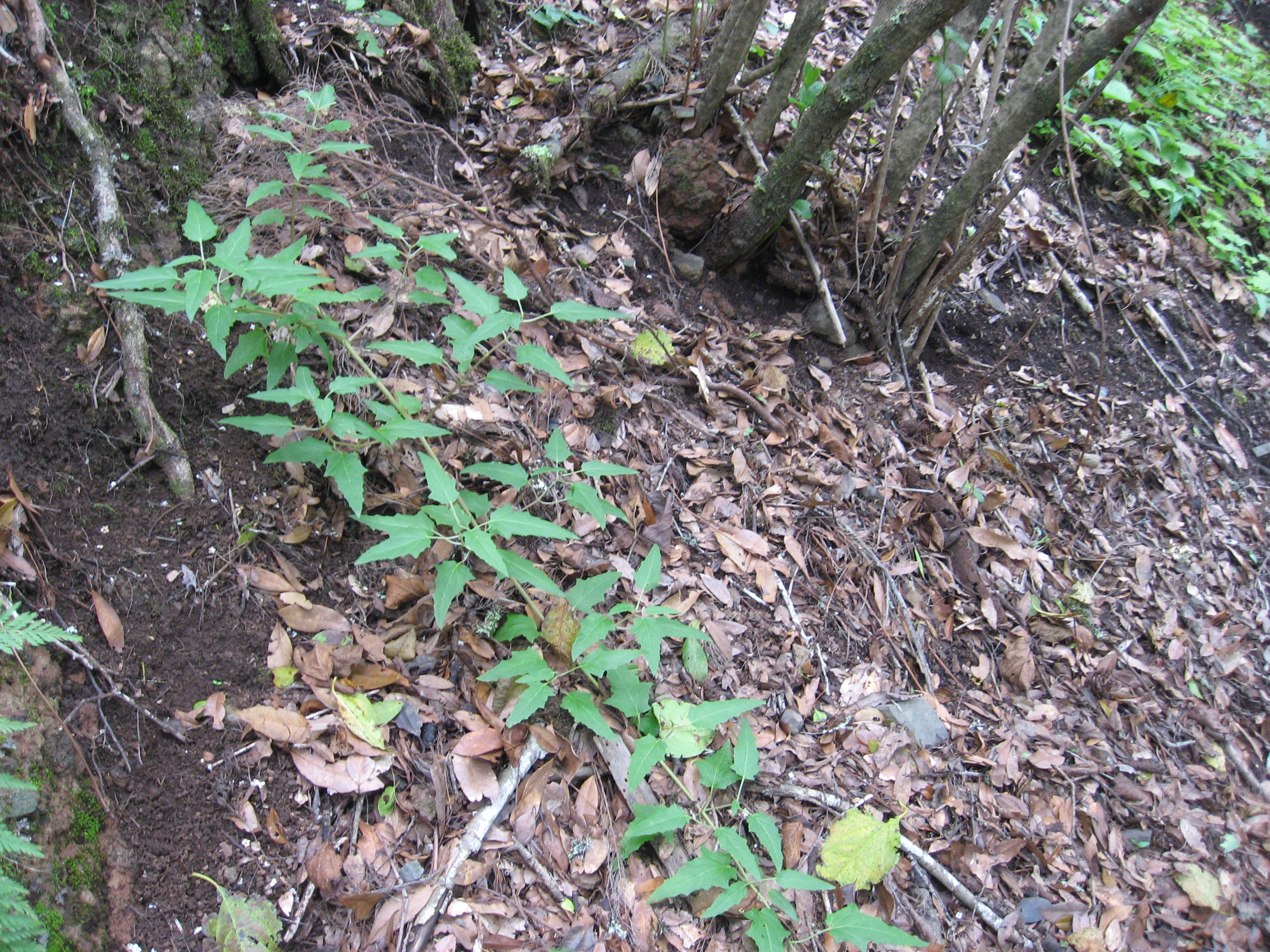

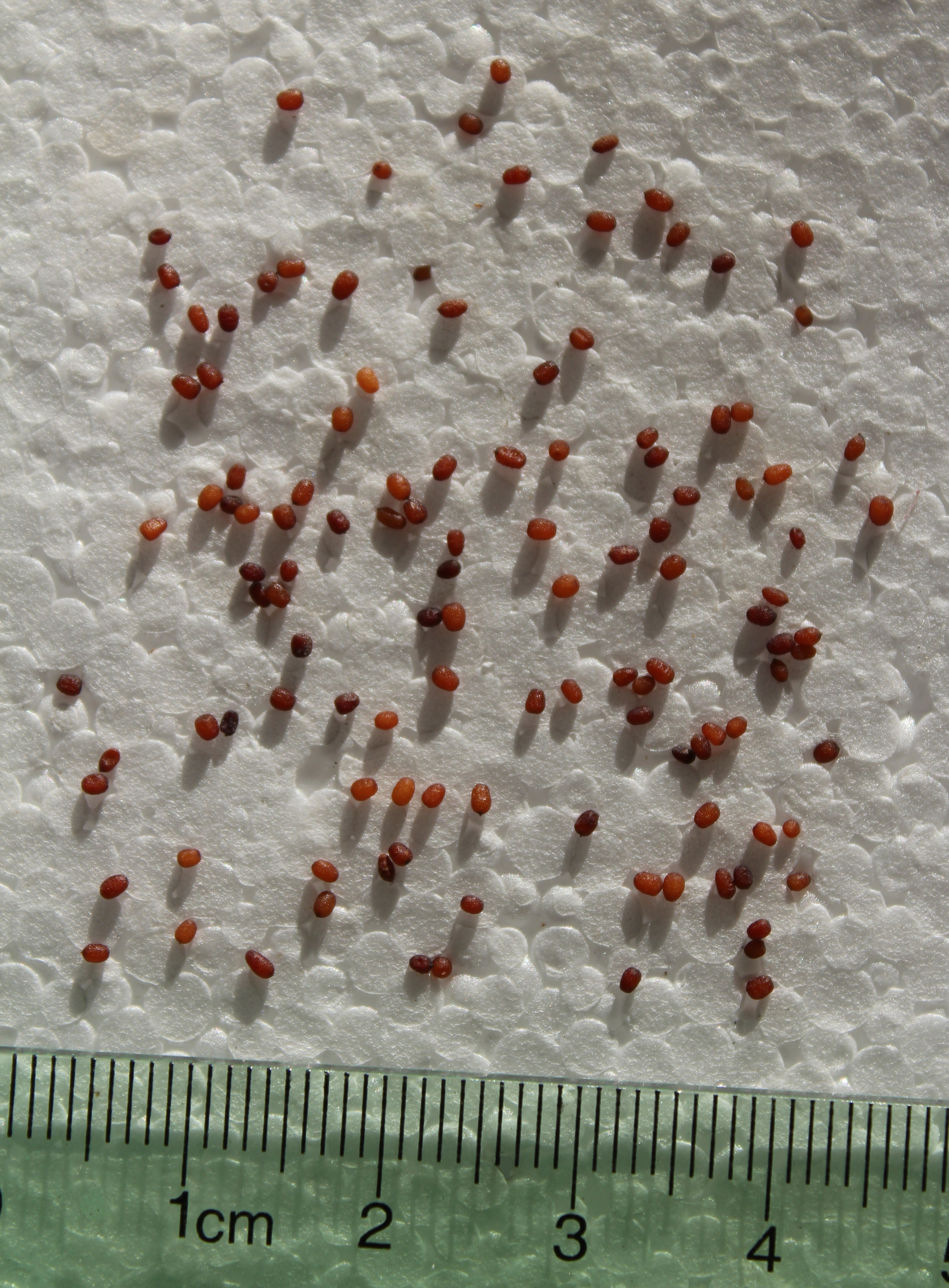
Seeds

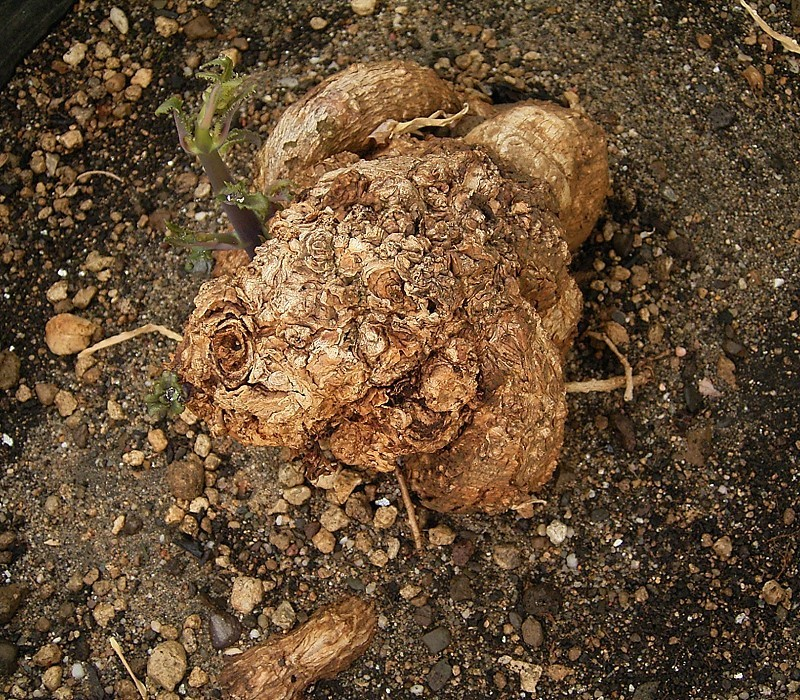
Tuberous root

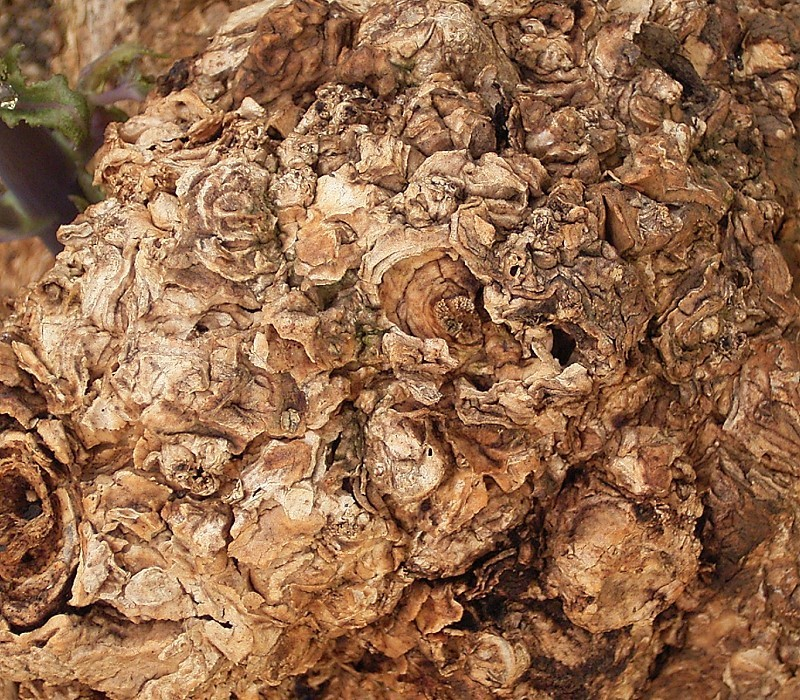
Tuberous root
