= Atlas Cedar Biosphere Reserve =

UNESCO Biosphere Reserve in Morocco

Coordinates: 33°1′10.3″N 5°18′31.1″W

The Atlas Cedar Biosphere Reserve (established 2016) is a UNESCO Biosphere Reserve located in the central Atlas Mountains of Morocco. The biosphere reserve is home to 75% of the world's majestic Atlas cedar (Cedrus atlantica) tree population. This part of the Atlas Mountains is rich in ecosystems and its peaks, reaching up to 3,700 meters (12,100 ft), provide the region with critically important water resources. Fruit plantations, modern agriculture and tourist activities, which have replaced semi-nomadic pastoral traditions, are taking their toll on scarce water resources. The rich local Berber culture is particularly strong in this area.

== Sources ==
This article incorporates text from a free content work (license statement/permission). Text taken from UNESCO - MAB Biosphere Reserves Directory, UNESCO, UNESCO.
