= Canarina abyssinica =

Scientific classification
- Kingdom: Plantae
- Clade: Tracheophytes
- Clade: Angiosperms
- Clade: Eudicots
- Clade: Asterids
- Order: Asterales
- Family: Campanulaceae
- Genus: Canarina
- Species: C. abyssinica

Binomial name
- Canarina abyssinica Engl.

Synonyms
- Canarina abyssinica var. umbrosa Engl.

Species of flowering plant

Canarina abyssinica is a dull grey-green plant with fleshy rootstock and triangular, ovate leaves. Its pendulous, solitary flowers 5–6 cm long are orange-red with a five lobed calyx and a large corolla that is tubular or bell-shaped.

== Distribution ==
An uncommon species found in wet forests at altitudes of 1620–2130 m, especially in western and central Kenya; Arusha in Tanzania; Mbale in Uganda; also in Ethiopia and South Sudan.
