= Senkelle Swayne's Hartebeest Sanctuary =

Wildlife sanctuary in Ethiopia

- IUCN category II (national park)
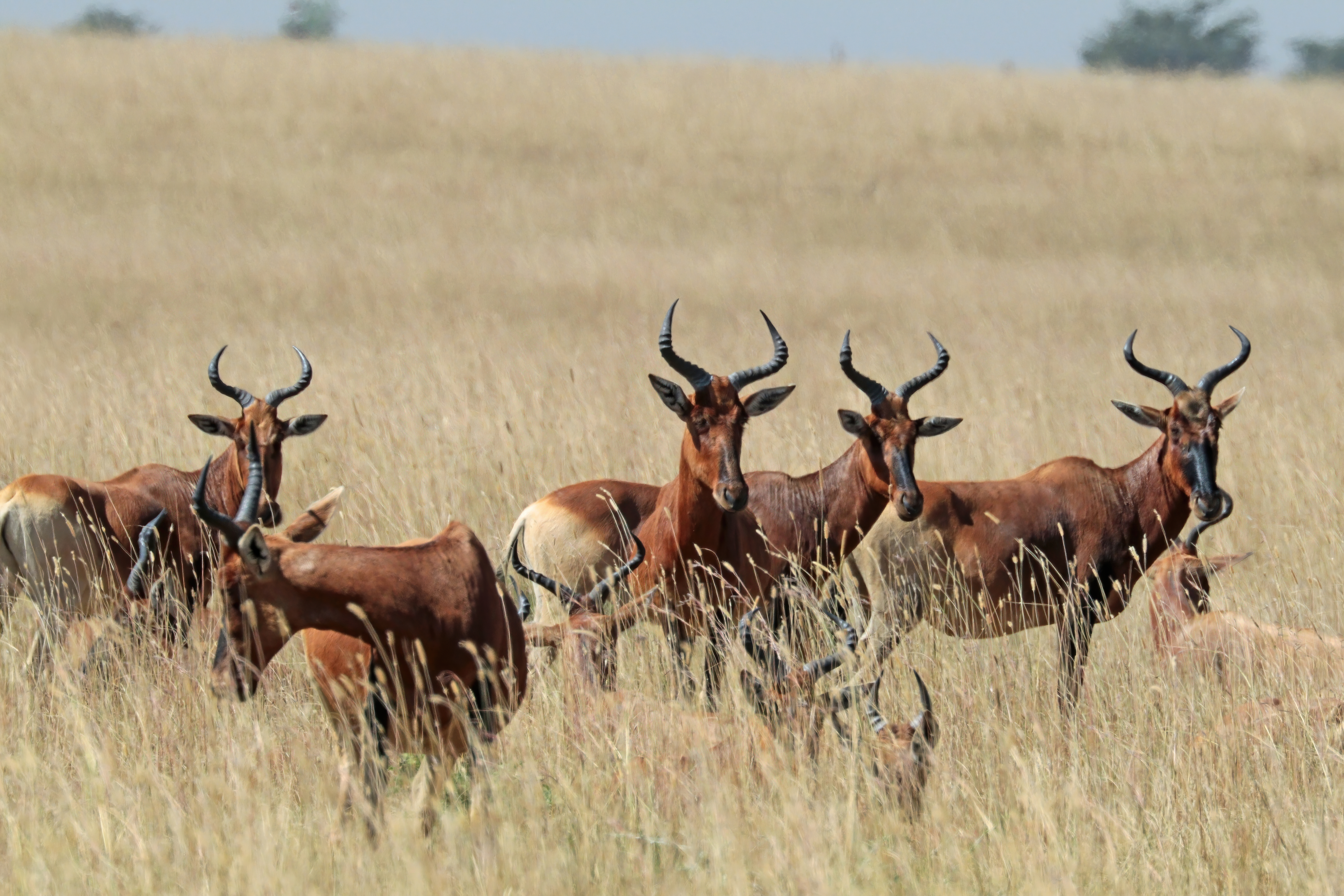
- A herd of Swayne's hartebeest

- Location within Ethiopia
- Location: Oromia Region, Ethiopia
- Nearest city: Hawassa
- Coordinates: 7°11′N 38°20′E
- Area: 54 km^{2} (21 sq mi)
- Established: 1972
- Governing body: Ethiopian Wildlife Conservation Authority (EWCA)

Senkelle Swayne's Hartebeest Sanctuary is a protected area in the Oromia Region (or kilil) of Ethiopia, dedicated especially to the protection of the Swayne's hartebeest (Alcelaphus buselaphus swaynei). Covering 54 km^{2} (21 sq mi), the reserve is located some 10 km (6.2 mi) south of the Shashemene-Arba Minch road near the town of Aje.

== Wildlife ==
=== Fauna ===
The sanctuary provides a home to one of Ethiopia's endemic subspecies, the Swayne Hartebeest with a population of 500 individuals roaming across the grasslands. Other species such as Bohor Reedbuck, Warthog, Greater kudu, and Oribi roam within the area of the sanctuary. Crested porcupine, Aardvark, and Abyssinian hare are also observed within the area for coexistence.

== Conservation ==
Although the sanctuary was set aside to protect the largest population of Swayne's hartebeest in Ethiopia, a mammal endemic to the country, the original herd of 3,000 animals has dwindled to a few hundred due to poaching. Nevertheless, according to the travel writer Philip Briggs "the small size of the reserve and open terrain make it the one place in Ethiopia where Swayne's hartebeest sightings are practically guaranteed."

Woody plant encroachment is an additional factor that leads to changes in animal habitat. During the course of 30 years, the sanctuary area covered by grassland declined by 9.8% while the total area covered by bushland increased by 21.4%.
