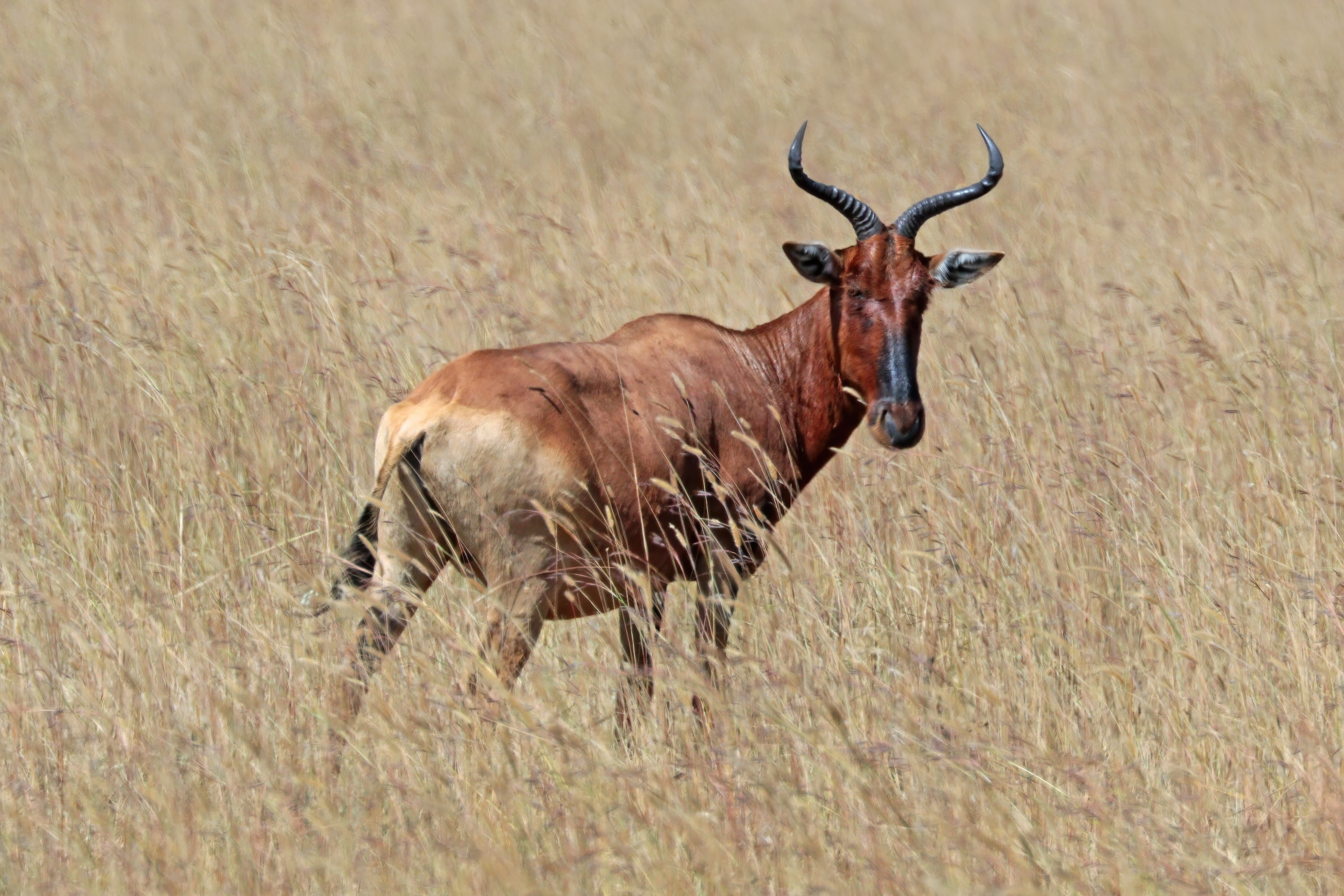
- Senkelle Swayne's Hartebeest Sanctuary, Ethiopia

Conservation status
- Endangered (IUCN 3.1)

- Endangered (ESA)

Scientific classification
- Kingdom: Animalia
- Phylum: Chordata
- Class: Mammalia
- Order: Artiodactyla
- Family: Bovidae
- Subfamily: Alcelaphinae
- Genus: Alcelaphus
- Species: A. buselaphus
- Subspecies: A. b. swaynei

Trinomial name
- Alcelaphus buselaphus swaynei (Sclater, 1892)
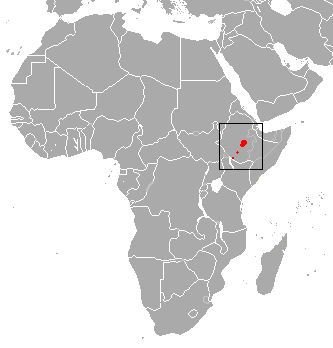
- Range of the Swayne Hartebeest (in red)

= Swayne's hartebeest =

Subspecies of African grassland antelope

Swayne's hartebeest (Alcelaphus buselaphus swaynei) is an endangered antelope native to Ethiopia. Two of the largest remaining populations are located in Senkelle Swayne's Hartebeest Sanctuary, Nechisar National Park and Maze National Park. It has been extirpated from Somalia. It is named after British officer H. G. C. Swayne (1860–1940).

When it comes to their population status, during the times before the early 1890s the Swayne's hartebeest was very common throughout Ethiopia and Somalia. The population then declined due to an epidemic during the mid-1890s which brought about an extremely high mortality rate for wildlife and livestock which were labeled as "in danger of extermination".

Swayne's hartebeest exhibits ecological differences from other subspecies of hartebeests in that tend to inhabit grassland habitats during the wet and dry seasons. They tend to select short grass areas of no more than 30 centimeters for feeding and have a preference for burned grassland patches. The preference for burned grassland patches has become relevant in the development of effective conservation strategies for the subspecies.

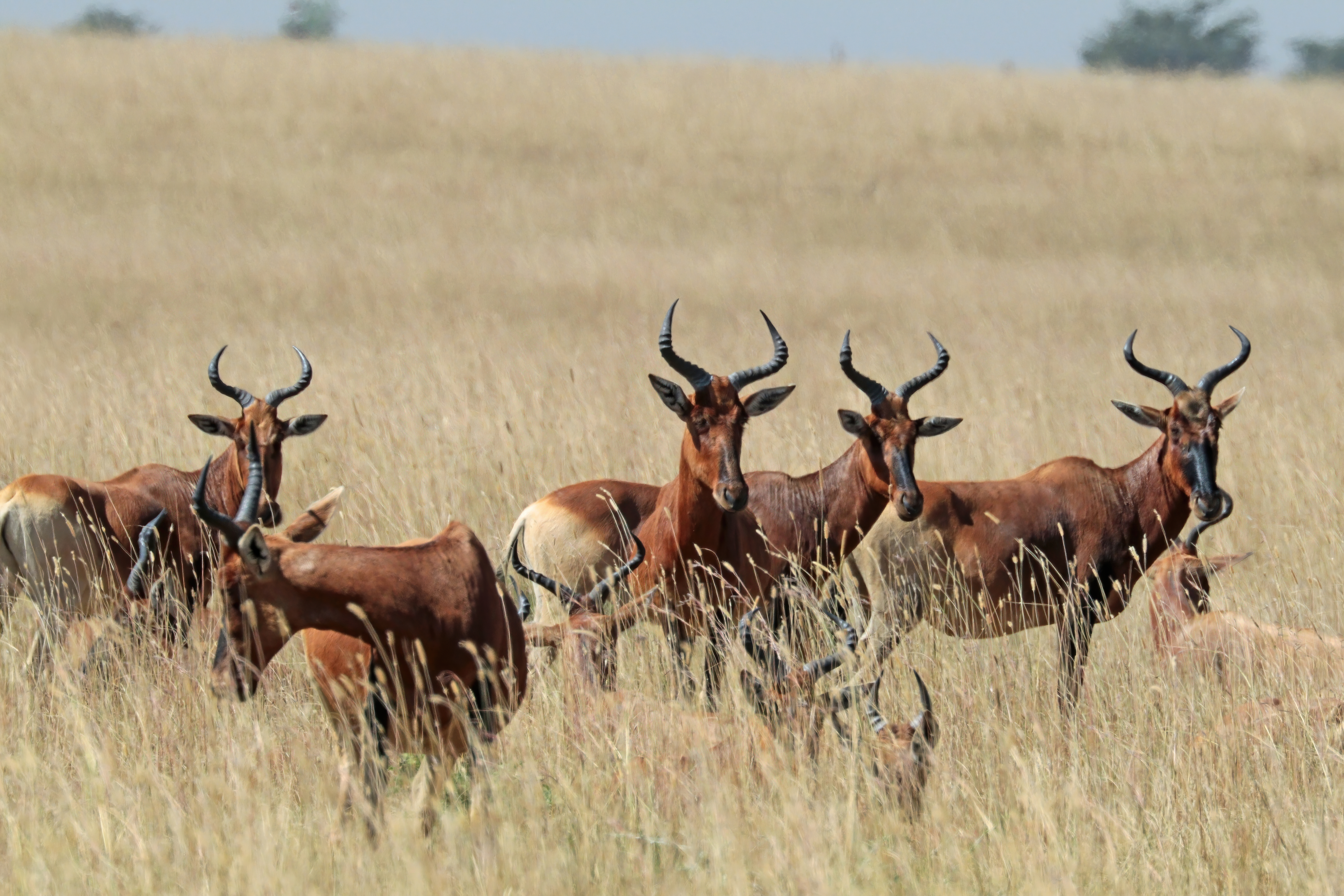
a herd of Swayne's hartebeest
