= Lake Tana Biosphere Reserve =

Protected area in Amhara Region, Ethiopia

Coordinates: 11°54′29″N 37°20′40″E

The Lake Tana Biosphere Reserve is a protected area located in the Amhara National Regional State approximately 563 km northwest of Addis Ababa in the north-western part of Ethiopia. The biosphere reserve comprises Lake Tana, the largest lake in Ethiopia, the main source of the Blue Nile, which provides important ecosystem services. The area is a hotspot of biodiversity, internationally known as an Important Bird Area and is of global importance for agricultural genetic diversity. The area is characterized by an enormous heterogeneity of land uses and natural ecosystems.

It was designated in 2014 and is administered by the ANRS Bureau of Culture, Tourism and Parks Development, under the authority of the Ethiopian Ministry of Science and Technology.

In 2015, the Lake Tana region was nominated as UNESCO Biosphere Reserve recognizing its national and international natural and cultural importance.

Its surface area (both marine and terrestrial) is 695,885 hectares, with its core area being 22,841 hectares (of which 7,699 are terrestrial), with buffer areas of 187,567 hectares (30,969 terrestrial), and transition areas of 485,477 hectares (354,297 terrestrial).

== Ecological characteristics ==
=== Flora ===
Indigenous trees include: Sesa (Albizia gummifera), Birbira (Millettia ferruginea), Wanza (Cordia Africana). The region is a gene center for indigenous crops such as noug (Guizotia Abyssinica), teff (Eragrostis tef). Wild coffee (Coffea arabica) occurs naturally in the area, especially in the Zegie Peninsula. Four major wetland ecosystem types have been identified: Riverine freshwater wetlands, lacustrine freshwater wetlands, palustrine freshwater wetlands, and agricultural flooded freshwater wetlands.

=== Wildlife ===
Lake Tana is the largest national freshwater body, accounting for 50% of the total inland waters of the country, and is the source of the Abbay of the Blue Nile River. The Biosphere Reserve is an important fish resource and is home to up to 67 different species of fish of which 70% are endemic. The barbus species of Lake Tana constitute the only remaining intact species of large cyprinid fish in the world. A large number of wetlands are located all around Lake Tana, some of them being the largest and ecologically most important units in Ethiopia and in the Horn of Africa, and also form part of the Central Ethiopian Wetland Complex. These wetlands, dominated by papyrus and typha stands, are breeding, nesting, and feeding grounds for very large bird populations, and provide a source of animal feed, domestic water supply, building material, fuel, food, etc. for local communities.

The Biosphere Reserve is part of the Eastern Afromontane Biodiversity Hotspot and comprises four terrestrial and three freshwater ‘Key Biodiversity Areas’. At Lake Tana, more than 217 different bird species have been recorded. The area is internationally renowned as an Important Bird Area and has a high abundance of qualifying areas around the lake as Ramsar site. Many Palaearctic migrant water birds depend on the lake as feeding and resting grounds, including the common crane (Grus Grus), Northern shoveller (Anas acuta), Black-tailed godwit (Limosa Limosa), and ruff (Philomachus pugnax). Other bird species like the wattled crane, the lesser jacana, and the endemic yellow-fronted parrot also breed here. Few patches of original forest vegetation and mountain ecosystem remain that have high plant endemism of global importance.

== Socioeconomic characteristics ==
Out of the 2,031,820 inhabitants of the proposed site, approximately 15,000 are living on the islands of Lake Tana. The area includes an array of rural settlements, as well as the city of Bahir Dar, which supports traditional land-use patterns. Agriculture (of which most is subsistence farming) forms the backbone of the economy with most of the other sectors (i.e. trade, fishing and tourism) being dependent on its strong backward and forward linkages. More than 2 million people live in the Biosphere Reserve with the Amhara people being the most populous in the area.

The main economic activities are agriculture, fishing, national and international tourism (religious and recreational) and sand mining. The enhancement of production and marketing of local products from the proposed biosphere reserve through cooperatives and small scale businesses will be intensified in close collaboration with local tourism services and the hotel sector. The Papyrus (Cyperus papyrus) is one of the most economically important wetland species of the Biosphere Reserve and is used inter alia for fuel, as well as for the construction of the unique Tanqua reed boats.

The area has a unique cultural, historical and aesthetic value with numerous monasteries and churches dating back to the 13th century. Culturally, the Biosphere Reserve is very important as it is home to many unique churches and monasteries of the Ethiopian Orthodox Tewahedo Church; some date back to the 13th century. These churches and monasteries contain valuable treasures of the Ethiopian Christian faith.

== Sources ==
This article incorporates text from a free content work (license statement/permission). Text taken from UNESCO - MAB Biosphere Reserves Directory, UNESCO, UNESCO.
