= Yayu Biosphere Reserve =

Biosphere reserve in Oromia Region, Ethiopia

- Location within Ethiopia
- Location: Illubabor Zone, Oromia Region, Ethiopia
- Coordinates: 8.3374°N 35.8174°E
- Area: 1,670 km^{2} (640 sq mi)
- Designation: UNESCO-MAB Biosphere Reserve
- Designated: 2010
- Governing body: Ethiopian Biodiversity Institute (EBI)

The Yayu Coffee Forest Biosphere Reserve is situated in Illubabor Zone of the Oromia Regional State, southwestern Ethiopia.

It is the center of origin for the most popular coffee in the world, Coffea arabica.

Yayu is the largest and most important forest in the world for the conservation of the wild coffee populations. The area plays a key role in the conservation of natural and cultural landscapes.

The biosphere reserve includes Eastern Afromontane Biodiversity Hotspot and Important Bird Areas of international significance. The area is also of cultural and historical significance since it possesses many archaeological sites, ritual sites, caves and waterfalls.

Administrative Division: Oromiya National Regional State, Oromiya Forestry andWildlife Enterprise, Illubabor Branch, Illubabor ZoneLand and Environmental Protection, Six Districts Administration, Oromiya Bureau of Land and Environmental Protection, Oromiya Forestry and Wildlife Enterprise, Oromiya Bureau of Agriculture and Rural Development, and Ministry of Science and Technology

== Human activities ==
The transition area is found adjacent to the buffer zone and it is composed of agricultural land, wetland, grassland, settlement area and fragments of forest land. All the management units (core, buffer, transition) in the proposed biosphere reserve are contiguous; but there are five core areas. About 154,300 permanent residents live in the biosphere reserve and mainly rely on agriculture.

The designation as a biosphere reserve is expected to enhance ecologically sound and traditional agriculture, to foster ecotourism and to create new jobs in small businesses such as coffee, bee-keeping, spices and horticulture activities. Within the biosphere reserve framework, local communities are familiarized with the wise use of natural resources and sustainable development techniques, and the implementation of conservation projects.

Currently, two projects funded by the German Federal Agency for Conservation and German Federal Ministry of Education and Research are being implemented in the proposed biosphere reserve: Conservation and use of the wild populations of Coffea arabica in the montane rainforests of Ethiopia and Public awareness and environmental education project.

== Ecological characteristics ==
The Yayu Coffee Forest Biosphere Reserve is situated in southwestern Ethiopia. The area plays a key role in the conservation of natural and cultural landscapes. The biospherereserve includes Eastern Afromontane Biodiversity Hotspot and Important Bird Areas of international significance and one of the last remaining montane rainforest fragments with wild Coffea arabica populations in the world.

The area is also of cultural and historical significance since it possesses many archaeological sites, ritual sites, caves and waterfalls. The core areas and buffer zone are considered as one of the Regional Forest Priority Areas(or Forest Conservation Area) and Forest Coffee conservation Site.
