= World Network of Biosphere Reserves =

Natural protected areas administered by the UNESCO

The UNESCO World Network of Biosphere Reserves (WNBR) covers internationally designated areas of high biological and cultural diversity, known as biosphere reserves, which are meant to demonstrate a balanced relationship between people and nature (e.g. encourage sustainable development). They are created under the UNESCO Man and the Biosphere Programme (MAB).

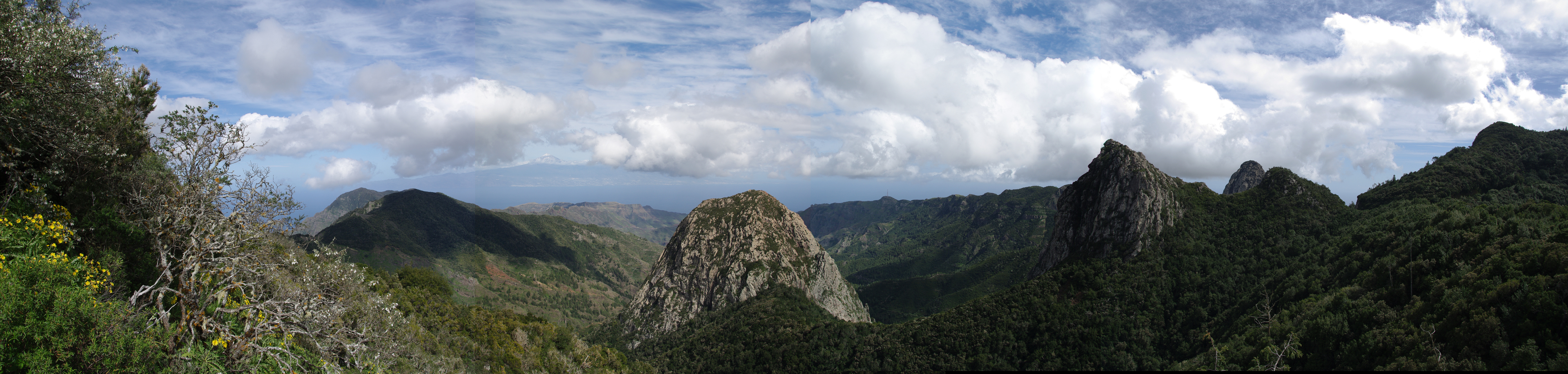
La Gomera is the second-smallest of the main Islands in Spain's Canary Island chain marked by craggy volcanic Mountains crisscrossed with hiking trails

== Mission ==
The World Network of Biosphere Reserves (WNBR) of the UNESCO MAB Programme consists of a dynamic and interactive network of sites of excellence. It works to foster the harmonious integration of people and nature for conservation and sustainable development through participatory dialogue, knowledge sharing, poverty reduction, human well-being improvements, respect for cultural values and by improving society's ability to cope with climate change. It is a unique tool for international cooperation through the exchange of experiences and know-how, capacity-building and the promotion of best practices.

== Network ==
Map of the Biosphere Reserves, as of 2013. Note: the transboundary places are included among all the countries in which they are located, and therefore have been counted several times.

As of September 2025^{[A]}, the network consisted of 784 biosphere reserves in 142 countries (including 25 transboundary sites) occurring in all regions of the world.

UNESCO region	Number of biosphere reserves (2022)	Number of countries (2022)
Africa	86	31
Arab States	35^{[B]}	14
Asia and the Pacific	168	40
Europe and North America	306	24
Latin America and the Caribbean	132	22

^{A} Source: World Network of Biosphere Reserves, UNESCO, 2022
^{B} Includes the "Intercontinental Biosphere Reserve of the Mediterranean", shared between Morocco and Spain

=== Criteria and periodic review process ===
Article 4 of the "Statutory Framework of the World Network of Biosphere Reserves". UNESCO. defines general criteria for an area to be qualified for designation as a biosphere reserve as follows:

1. It should encompass a mosaic of ecological systems representative of major biogeographic regions, including a gradation of human interventions.
2. It should be of significance for biological diversity conservation.
3. It should provide an opportunity to explore and demonstrate approaches to sustainable development on a regional scale.
4. It should have an appropriate size to serve the three functions of biosphere reserves — conservation, development, logistic support.
5. It should include these functions through appropriate zonation, recognizing core, buffer, and outer transition areas.
6. Organizational arrangements should be provided for the involvement and participation of a suitable range of inter alia public authorities, local communities and private interests in the design and carrying out the functions of a biosphere reserve.
7. In addition, provisions should be made for:
  1. mechanisms to manage human use and activities in the buffer zone or zones;
  2. a management policy or plan for the area as a biosphere reserve;
  3. a designated authority or mechanism to implement this policy or plan;
  4. programmes for research, monitoring, education and training.

Article 9 of the Statutory Framework states that "the status of each biosphere reserve should be subject to a periodic review every ten years, based on a report prepared by the concerned authority, on the basis of the criteria of Article 4". If a biosphere reserve no longer satisfies the criteria contained in Article 4, it may be recommended the state concerned take measures to ensure conformity. Should a biosphere reserve still not satisfy the criteria contained in Article 4, within a reasonable period, the area will no longer be referred to as a biosphere reserve which is part of the network.

=== Withdrawals ===
Article 9 of the Statutory Framework gives a state the right to remove a biosphere reserve under its jurisdiction from the network. As of July 2018, a total of 45 sites had been withdrawn from the World Network of Biosphere Reserves by 9 countries. Some reserves have been withdrawn after they no longer met newer, stricter criteria for reserves, for example on zonation or area size.

In June 2017, during the International Coordinating Council of the Man and the Biosphere Programme (MAB ICC) meeting in Paris, the United States has withdrawn 17 sites (out of the country's previous total of 47 sites) from the program.
