= Man and the Biosphere Programme =

UNESCO conservation programme

Logo

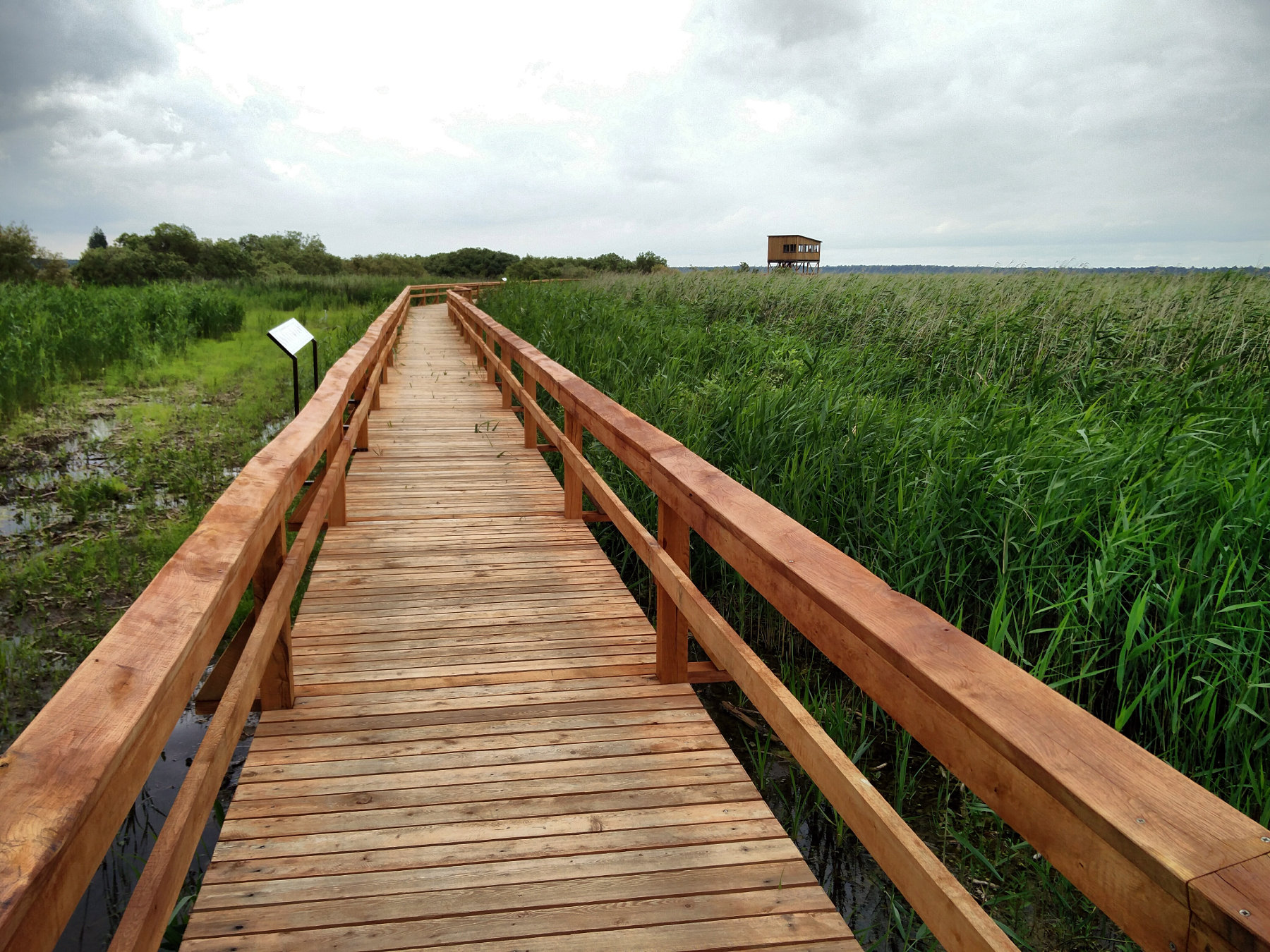
Walkway in Zuvintas Biosphere Reserve

The Man and the Biosphere Programme (MAB) is an intergovernmental scientific program, launched in 1971 by UNESCO, that aims to establish a scientific basis for the 'improvement of relationships' between people and their environments. Even though the MAB programme was officially launched in 1971, the Intergovernmental Conference of Experts on the Scientific Basis for Rational Use and Conservation of the Resources of the Biosphere hosted by UNESCO in Paris in September 1968 is often cited as the conceptual birth of MAB.

MAB engages with the international development agenda, especially the Sustainable Development Goals and the Post 2015 Development Agenda. The MAB programme provides a platform for cooperation in research and development. As of June 2026, 797 sites across 145 countries, including 22 transboundary sites, have been included in the World Network of Biosphere Reserves. The reserves cover more than 5% of the world’s surface and are home to over 260 million people.

== Biosphere reserves ==
Biosphere reserves are areas comprising terrestrial, marine and coastal ecosystems. Its biosphere reserves are nominated by national governments and remain under the sovereign jurisdiction of the states where they are located. Their status is internationally recognized. Biosphere reserves are 'Science for Sustainability support sites'.

Biosphere reserves have three zones:

- The core area(s) comprises a strictly protected ecosystem.
- The buffer zone surrounds or adjoins the core areas and is used for ecological practices.
- The transition area is the part of the reserve where most activity is allowed.

=== IUCN classification ===
The first biosphere reserves were designated in 1976 in several countries including the US, UK, Uruguay, Thailand, Iran and Poland.

In 1996, the IUCN and MAB published a guideline for how to assess UNESCO biosphere reserves in the IUCN classification system. The IUCN distinguishes between the biosphere core area, buffer zones, transition zones, and each individual biosphere reserve. Biosphere core zones were in IUCN category I. Either Ia (strict nature reserve) or Ib (wilderness area). Biosphere buffer zones would fall into categories IV, V or VI, and transition zones would be categorized as either V or VI, if possible. In the 2020s, the zones are categorized as follows: core (category I-IV), buffer (category V-VI), transition (uncategorized).

== Programme's structure ==
Participating countries establish MAB National Committees that define and implement each country's activities. MAB currently operates through 158 national committees established among the 195 member states and nine associate member states of UNESCO.

The agenda of the MAB programme is defined by its main governing body, the International Coordinating Council. The MAB Council consists of 34 member states elected by UNESCO's General Conference. The council elects a chair and five vice-chairs from each of UNESCO's geopolitical regions, one of which functions as a rapporteur. These constitute the MAB Bureau.

The MAB Secretariat is based at UNESCO's Division of Ecological and Earth Sciences, at UNESCO's headquarters in Paris. It works with field offices at national and regional levels. MAB is funded by UNESCO and mobilizes funds in trust granted by Member States, bilateral and multilateral sources, and extra-budgetary funds provided by countries, the private sector and private institutions.

== World Congress of Biosphere Reserves ==
The first World Congress of Biosphere Reserves was held in Minsk, Belarus in 1983; the congress created an 'Action Plan for Biosphere Reserves' which was adopted the following year.

The second World Congress was held in Seville, Spain in March 1995.

The third World Congress was held in Madrid, Spain from February 4–9, 2008.

The fourth World Congress of Biosphere Reserves took place in Lima, Peru, from March 14–17, 2016.

The fifth World Congress was held in Hangzhou, China from September 22–27 2025.

== Networks ==
The World Network of Biosphere Reserves are as follows:

- The African Biosphere Reserves Network (AfriMAB) was created in 1996 and comprises 33 African countries.
- The ArabMAB Network was officially launched in 1997 and represents 18 Arab countries.
- The East Asian Biosphere Reserve Network was launched in 1994. Today, it consists of China, the Democratic People's Republic of Korea, Japan, Kazakhstan, Mongolia, the Republic of Korea and the Russian Federation.
- EuroMAB is the network of biosphere reserves in Europe and North America. Created in 1987, it is the largest MAB Regional Network with 53 countries.
- The Ibero-American MAB Network (IberoMAB) was created in 1992. It comprises 22 countries from Latin American and the Caribbean, Spain and Portugal.
- The Pacific Man and the Biosphere Network (PacMAB) was created in 2006 and comprises the Federated States of Micronesia, Kiribati, Palau, Papua New Guinea, Samoa and Tonga.
- The South and Central Asia MAB Network (SACAM) was created in 2002 and comprises Afghanistan, Bangladesh, Bhutan, India, Iran, Kazakhstan, Maldives, Nepal, Pakistan and Sri Lanka.
- The Southeast Asian Biosphere Reserve Network (SeaBRnet) was created in 1998. Today, it comprises Cambodia, China, Indonesia, Japan, Lao PDR, Malaysia, Myanmar, Philippines, Thailand and Viet Nam.
- The East Atlantic Biosphere Reserve Network (REDBIOS) was created in 1994. It comprises the Canary Islands (Spain), Cape Verde, Guinea Bissau, Madeira and Azores (Portugal), Mauritania, Morocco, Sao Tomé and Principe, and Senegal.
- The World Network of Island and Coastal Biosphere Reserves was established in 2012 and comprises 22 countries.

== See also ==
- Agenda 21
