= Pinjor Formation =

Geologic formation in India

- Stratigraphic range: Pleistocene; ~2.58–0.4 Ma
- Type: Geological formation
- Underlies: Boulder Conglomerate Formation
- Overlies: Tatrot Formation

Location
- Coordinates: 30.7°N 76.8°E
- Approximate paleocoordinates: 29.2°N 77.3°E
- Region: Haryana, Punjab, India, Himachal Pradesh, Punjab, Pakistan, Chandigarh
- Country: India

Type section
- Named for: Pinjor town, India
- Pinjor Formation (India)

The Pinjor Formation is a Cenozoic geologic formation in India. The fossils of mammals are abundant from the formation, with the addition of reptiles, fishes and invertebrates.

== Paleobiota ==
Color key: Taxon / Reclassified taxon / Taxon falsely reported as present / Dubious taxon or junior synonym / Ichnotaxon / Ootaxon / Morphotaxon

Notes
Uncertain or tentative taxa are in small text
~~crossed out~~ taxa are discredited.

=== Reptiles ===
==== Pseudosuchians ====
It is possible that Rhamphosuchus crassidens and probably Hypselornis sivalensis may have been present in Pinjor Formation.

Pseudosuchians from the Pinjor Formation
Genus	Species	Material	Location	Notes	Images
Gavialis	G. gangeticus	WIF/A 459-461, partial craniums.	Ambala	A gavialid.	
Gavialis	G. browni	WIF/A 458, maxillary fragment.	Ambala	A gavialid.	
Crocodylus	C. palaeindicus	A/683, cranial rostrum.	Naipli	A crocodylid.	
Crocodylus	C. biporcatus	A/684, a complete skull.	Naipli	A crocodylid.	

==== Turtle ====
Turtles from the Pinjor Formation
Genus	Species	Material	Location	Notes	Images
Megalochelys	M. atlas	Numerous specimens, including ones referred to M. sivalensis.	Known from Plio-Pleistocene deposits of entire Punjab.	A large sized testudinid.	
cf. Geoclemys	cf. G. hamiltonii	WIF/A 454, partially preserved carapace and antero-posteriorly broken plastron.	Ambala	A geoemydid.	
Omegachelys	O. sahnii	WIF/A 451, terminally broken large carapace.	Ambala	A geoemydid.	

==== Squamates ====
Squamates from the Pinjor Formation
Genus	Species	Material	Location	Notes	Images
Varanus	V. sivalensis	Distal end of humerus, dorsal vertebrae	"Pinjor Zone"	An unusually large varanid .	

==== Birds ====
It is possible that Leptoptilos falconeri and Struthio asiaticus might have been present in Pinjor Formation.

Birds from the Pinjor Formation
Genus	Species	Material	Location	Notes	Images
Aves	indet.		Potwar Plateau	Indeterminate aves.	
Struthio	S. camelus	eggshells fragments	Chandigarh region	A struthionid.	

=== Mammals ===
==== Eulipotyphla ====
Eulipotyphlas from the Pinjor Formation
Genus	Species	Material	Location	Notes	Images
Chandisorex	C. punchkulaensis		Chandigarh region	A soricid.	

==== Rodent ====
Rodents from the Pinjor Formation
Genus	Species	Material	Location	Notes	Images
Hystrix	H. leucurus		Chandigarh region	A hystricid.	
Rattus	R. sp.		Chandigarh region	A murid.	
Mus	M. linnaeusi		Chandigarh region	A murid.	
Mus	cf. M. flynni		Chandigarh region	A murid.	
Hadromys	H. loujacobsi		Chandigarh region	A murid	
Hadromys	H. sp.		Chandigarh region	A murid	
Nesokia	N. punchkulaensis		Chandigarh region	A murid	
Cremnomys	C. blanfordi		Chandigarh region	A murid	
Dilatomys	D. sp.		Chandigarh region	A murid	
Golunda	G. sp.		Chandigarh region	A murid	
Anepsirhizomys	A. pinjoricus		Chandigarh region	A murid	
Tatera	T. pinjoricus		Chandigarh region	A murid	
Bandicota	B. sp		Chandigarh region	A murid	

==== Lagomorph ====
Lagomorphs from the Pinjor Formation
Genus	Species	Material	Location	Notes	Images
Pliosiwalagus	P. sivalensis		Chandigarh region	A leporid	

==== Primates ====
It is possible that Hominins (most likely Archaic humans) were present in Pinjor Formation.

Primates from the Pinjor Formation
Genus	Species	Material	Location	Notes	Images
Theropithecus	T. oswaldi		Chandigarh region	A cercopithecid.	
Procynocephalus	P. subhimalayanus		Chandigarh region	A cercopithecid.	

==== Felids ====
Felids from the Pinjor Formation
Genus	Species	Material	Location	Notes	Images
Megantereon	M. falconeri		Chandigarh region, Roorkee region	A machairodontine felid.	
Homotherium	H. sp.		"Pinjor Faunal Zone"	A machairodontine felid.	
Dinofelis	D. cristata		Chandigarh region	A machairodontine felid, includes cf. Panthera cristata.	
Sivapanthera	S. potens		Chandigarh region	A feline felid.	
Panthera	P. uncia		Potwar Plateau	A pantherine felid.	
Panthera	P. gombaszogensis		Haro River	A pantherine felid.	
Felis	F. subhimalayana		Upper Siwaliks	A feline felid.	

==== Canids ====
Canids from the Pinjor Formation
Genus	Species	Material	Location	Notes	Images
Canis	C. pinjorensis		Chandigarh region	A canine canid.	
Canis	C. etruscus		Potwar Plateau and Siwaliks of Dádúpúr.	A canine canid, includes Canis cautleyi.	
Prototocyon	P. curvipalatus		Chandigarh region	A canine canid. Also known from the older Tatrot Formation.	

==== Ursids ====
Ursid from the Pinjor Formation
Genus	Species	Material	Location	Notes	Images
Agriotherium	A. sivalensis		Kasamuri Rao, Saharanpur of North-Western Provinces and Siwalik Ganges valley neighbourhood.	A ailuropodine ursid.	
Melursus	M. theobaldi		Kangra district	A ursine ursid.	

==== Viverrids ====
Viverrids from the Pinjor Formation
Genus	Species	Material	Location	Notes	Images
Vishnuictis	V. durandi		Upper Siwalik	A viverrine viverrid.	
Vishnuictis	V. sp.		Chandigarh region	A viverrine viverrid.	
Viverra	V. bakeri		Upper Siwalik	A viverrine viverrid.	

==== Mustelids ====
Mustelids from the Pinjor Formation
Genus	Species	Material	Location	Notes	Images
Enhydriodon	E. sivalensis		Chandigarh region, Potwar Plateau	A lutrine mustelid.	
Sinictis	S. lydekkeri		Upper Siwaliks	A mustelid	
Amblonyx	A. indicus		Upper Siwaliks	A lutrine mustelid.	
Amblonyx	A. sp.		Upper Siwaliks	A lutrine mustelid.	
Mellivora	M. sivalensis		Chandigarh region	A mellivorine mustelid.	
Lutra	L. palaeindica		Upper Siwaliks	A lutrine mustelid.	

==== Hyaenids ====
Hyaenids from the Pinjor Formation
Genus	Species	Material	Location	Notes	Images
Pachycrocuta	P. brevirostris		Chandigarh region, Potwar Plateau	A hyaenid.	
Crocuta	C. sivalensis		Upper Siwaliks	A hyaenid.	
Pliocrocuta	P. perrieri		Upper Siwaliks	A hyaenid.	
Hyaenictis	H. bosei		Chandigarh region	A hyaenid.	

==== Proboscideans ====
Proboscideans from the Pinjor Formation
Genus	Species	Material	Location	Notes	Images
Stegodon	S. pinjorensis		Chandigarh region	A stegodontid proboscidean.	
Stegodon	S. insignis		Chandigarh region	A stegodontid proboscidean.	
Stegodon	S. sp.		Chandigarh region	A stegodontid proboscidean.	
Stegodon	S. bombifrons		Potwar Plateau	A stegodontid proboscidean, also known from the older Tatrot Formation.	
Elephas	E. hysudricus		Chandigarh region	An elephantid proboscidean.	
Elephas	E. planifrons		Chandigarh region	An elephantid proboscidean, also known from the older Tatrot Formation.	
Elephas	E. platycephalus		Chandigarh region	An elephantid proboscidean.	
Anancus	A. sivalensis		Chandigarh region	A gomphothere proboscidean, also known from the older Tatrot Formation.	
Stegolophodon	S. stegodontoides		Chandigarh region	A stegodontid proboscidean, also known from the older Tatrot Formation.	

==== Rhinocerotids ====
Rhinocerotids from the Pinjor Formation
Genus	Species	Material	Location	Notes	Images
Rhinoceros	R. sivalensis		Chandigarh region	A rhinocerotine rhinocerotid.	
Rhinoceros	R. platyrhinus		Chandigarh region	A large rhinocerotine rhinocerotid, includes Punjabitherium.	
Rhinoceros	R. palaeindicus		Chandigarh region	A rhinocerotine rhinocerotid.	
Subchilotherium	S. intermedium		Chandigarh region	A aceratheriine rhinocerotid. Also known from the older Tatrot Formation.	

==== Bovids ====
Bovids from the Pinjor Formation
Genus	Species	Material	Location	Notes	Images
Bison	B. sivalensis			A bovine bovid.	
Damalops	D. palaeindicus			An alcelaphine bovid.	
Damalops	D. sp.			An alcelaphine bovid.	
Oryx	O. sivalensis			A hippotragine bovid.	
Hemibos	H. acuticornis			A bovine bovid.	
Hemibos	H. triquetricornis			A bovine bovid.	
Hemibos	H. antilopinus			A bovine bovid.	
Antilope	A. subtorta			An antilopine bovid.	
Bubalus	B. platycerops			A bovine bovid.	
Bubalus	B. palaeindicus			A bovine bovid.	
Leptobos	L. falconeri			A bovine bovid.	
Bos	B. acutifrons			A bovine bovid.	
Proamphibos	P. sp.			A bovine bovid	
Caprinae	Indeterminate			An indeterminate caprine bovid.	
Bucapra	B. deviesi			A caprine bovid	
Reduncinae	Indeterminate			An indeterminate reduncine bovid.	
Boselaphus	B. cf. namadicus			A bovine bovid.	
Sivatragus	S. bohlini			A hippotragine bovid.	
Bovidae	Indeterminate			Indeterminate bovids.	
Gazella	G. sp.			An antilopine bovid	
Sivacapra	S. subhimalayaensis			A caprine bovid	
Sivacobus	S. palaeindicus			A reduncine bovid.	
Megalotragus	M. sp.			An alcelaphine bovid.	
Alcelaphus	A. sp.			An alcelaphine bovid.	

==== Cervids ====
Cervids from the Pinjor Formation
Genus	Species	Material	Location	Notes	Images
Cervus	C. sivalensis			A large-size cervid.	
Cervus	C. triplidens			A cervid.	
Cervus	C. sp.			A cervid.	
Metacervocerus	M. punjabiensis			A cervid.	
Eucladoceros	E. sp.			A large cervid.	
Praesinomegaceros	P. sp.			A large cervid.	
Rucervus	R. sp.			A cervid.	

==== Giraffids ====
Giraffids from the Pinjor Formation
Genus	Species	Material	Location	Notes	Images
Giraffa	G. sivalensis			A giraffid.	
Sivatherium	S. giganteum			A giraffid.	
Sivatherium	S. sp.			A giraffid.	

==== Suids ====
Suids from the Pinjor Formation
Genus	Species	Material	Location	Notes	Images
Sus	S. falconeri			A suid.	
Sus	S. hysudricus			A suid.	
Sus	S. giganteus			A suid.	
Sus	S. choprai			A suid.	
Kolpochoerus	K. sp.			A suid.	
Potamochoerus	P. theobaldi			A suid.	
Potamochoerus	P. palaeindicus			A suid.	
Sivachoerus	S. sp.			A suid.	
Suidae	Indeterminate			Indeterminate suids.	

==== Other Ungulates ====
Other Ungulates from the Pinjor Formation
Genus	Species	Material	Location	Notes	Images
Hexaprotodon	H. sivalensis			A hippopotamid.	
Camelus	C. sivalensis			A camelid.	
Equus	E. cautleyi			An equid, includes Equus sivalensis.	
Equus	E. namadicus			An equid, includes Equus sivalensis.	
Nestoritherium	N. sivalense			A chalicotheriid.	
