= Bush rat (disambiguation) =

Bush rat may refer to several rat species:

- Rattus fuscipes, the Australian bush rat
- Aethomys, the African bush rats, also known as rock rats or rock mice
- Golunda ellioti, the Indian bush rat
- Hadromys, the Manipur and Yunnan bush rats
- Neotoma floridana, also known as the eastern woodrat or Florida woodrat
