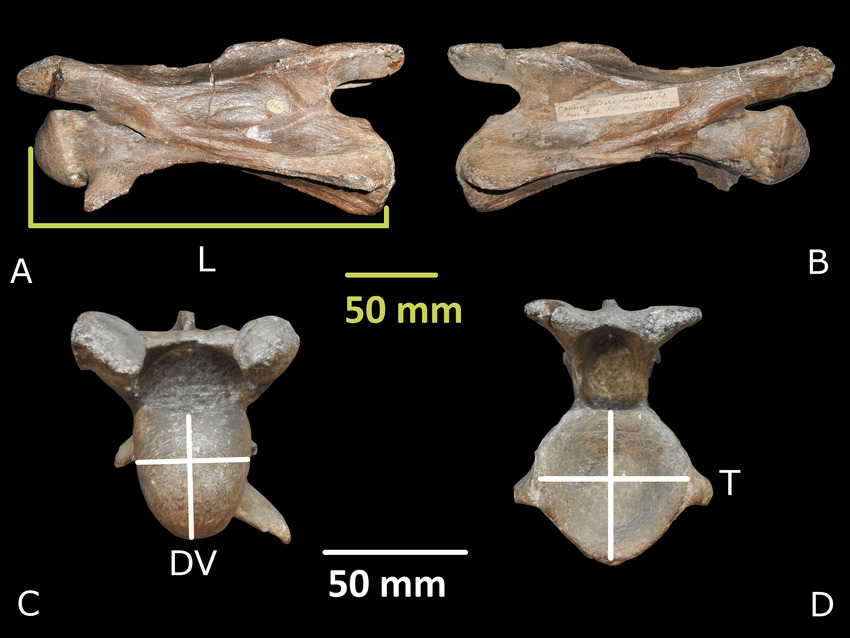
- The holotype cervical vertebra of G. sivalensis.

Scientific classification
- Kingdom: Animalia
- Phylum: Chordata
- Class: Mammalia
- Order: Artiodactyla
- Family: Giraffidae
- Genus: Giraffa
- Species: †G. sivalensis

Binomial name
- †Giraffa sivalensis Falconer & Cautley, 1843

= Giraffa sivalensis =

Giraffa sivalensis Temporal range: Pleistocene, 2.58–0.6 Ma

Extinct species of mammal

Giraffa sivalensis is an extinct species of giraffe that lived during Early–Middle Pleistocene epoch in Pinjor Formation of India and Pakistan. An almost perfectly preserved cervical vertebrae was discovered, that was designated as the holotype, several humeri, radii, metacarpals and teeth were also discovered from the same location and later referred to this taxon. It is one of the known occurrences of the genus Giraffa outside of Africa, and also the first fossil species of the genus.

== History and Naming ==
Giraffa sivalensis locality in the Shivalik Fossil Park of Himachal Pradesh, India.

The holotype third cervical vertebra, OR39747, was discovered from the Sivalik Hills(most likely in the Shivalik Fossil Park) by Capt. Proby Cautley in 1838, he believed that the specimen was similar to modern Giraffes and might be the first fossil species of the genus Giraffa, as no other fossil giraffes species were reported during that time. Later Hugh Falconer and Proby Cautley in 1843 described the fossils as Camelopardalis sivalensis, where the species name is after the Sivalik Hills. Later Richard Lydekker in 1885 disputed the Falconer and Cautley's statement, where he insisted that the vertebra is the 5th cervical vertebra of a small sized individual.

== Description ==
The size of G. sivalensis holotype was estimated to be approximately 400 kg, and a weight range of 228 to 557 kg on the basis of the cervical vertebra, the estimates yielded from the molar length also agree with this length, though the humerus suggest the weight to be 790 kg.
