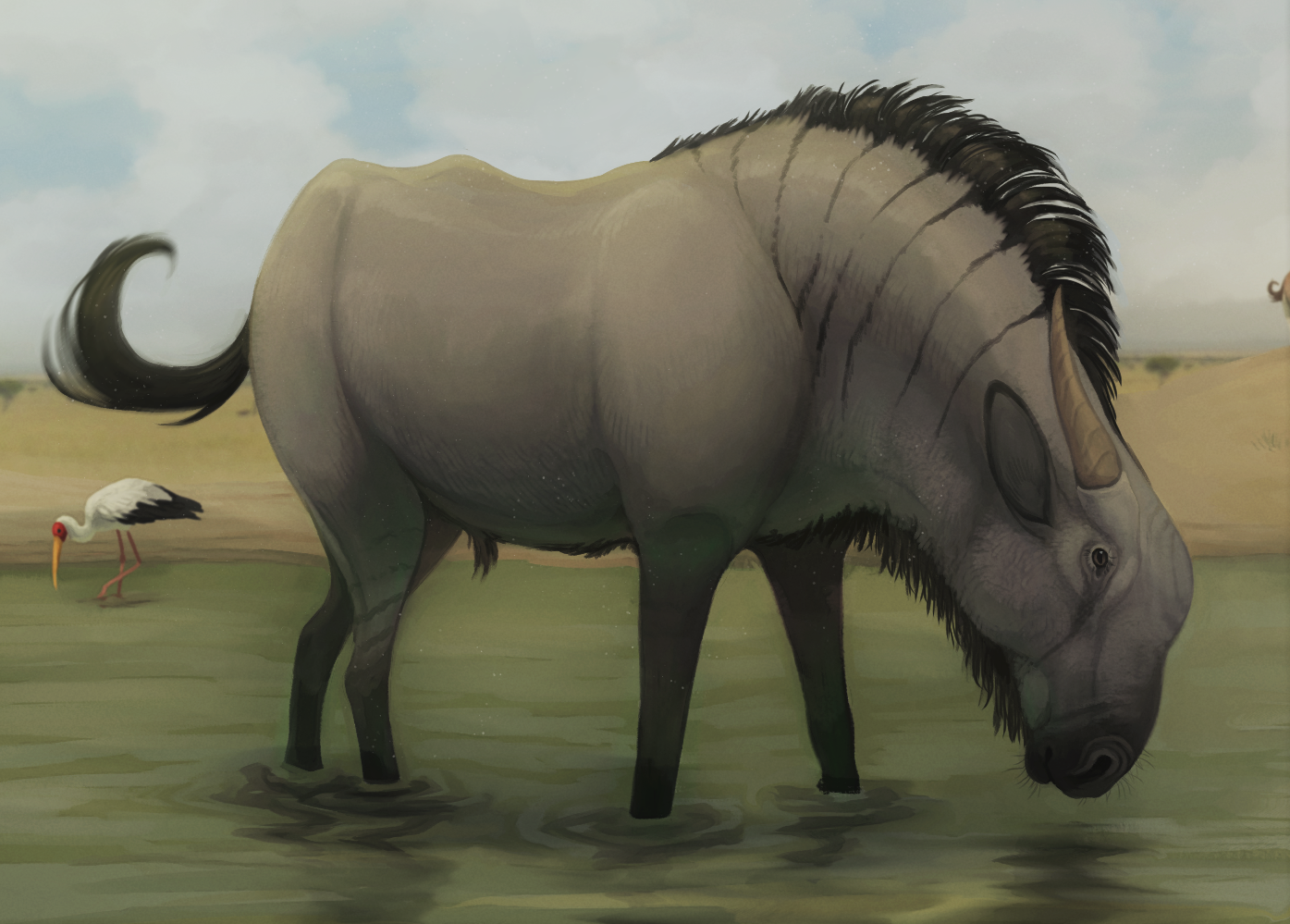
- Rusingoryx drinking

Scientific classification
- Kingdom: Animalia
- Phylum: Chordata
- Class: Mammalia
- Order: Artiodactyla
- Family: Bovidae
- Subfamily: Alcelaphinae
- Genus: †Rusingoryx; Pickford & Thomas, 1984
- Species: †R. atopocranion

Binomial name
- †Rusingoryx atopocranion Pickford & Thomas, 1984

Synonyms
- Megalotragus atopocranion Gentry, 2010 (Pickford & Thomas, 1984)

= Rusingoryx =

Rusingoryx Temporal range: 0.075–0.050 Ma Early Pleistocene – Late Pleistocene

Extinct genus of even-toed ungulates

Rusingoryx is a genus of extinct alcelaphine bovid artiodactyl closely related to the wildebeest. It contains only one species, R. atopocranion, that lived on the plains of Kenya during the Pleistocene. It was originally named as a species of Megalotragus.

Rusingoryx is known for its strange pointed nose with a large nasal dome. This structure represents an instance of convergent evolution with the crests of hadrosaurid dinosaurs, which were used for display and vocalization. Studies have shown that the Rusingoryx is a specialized grazing animal, with a preference for arid grasslands. Rusingoryx was migratory.

The first specimens, which were poorly preserved, were described in 1983, having been taken from a site called Bovid Hill on Rusinga Island in Lake Victoria. Butchered bones found in 2011 with stone tools suggested that they had been killed by humans. In 2016, remains of an additional 26 better preserved individuals were discovered.
