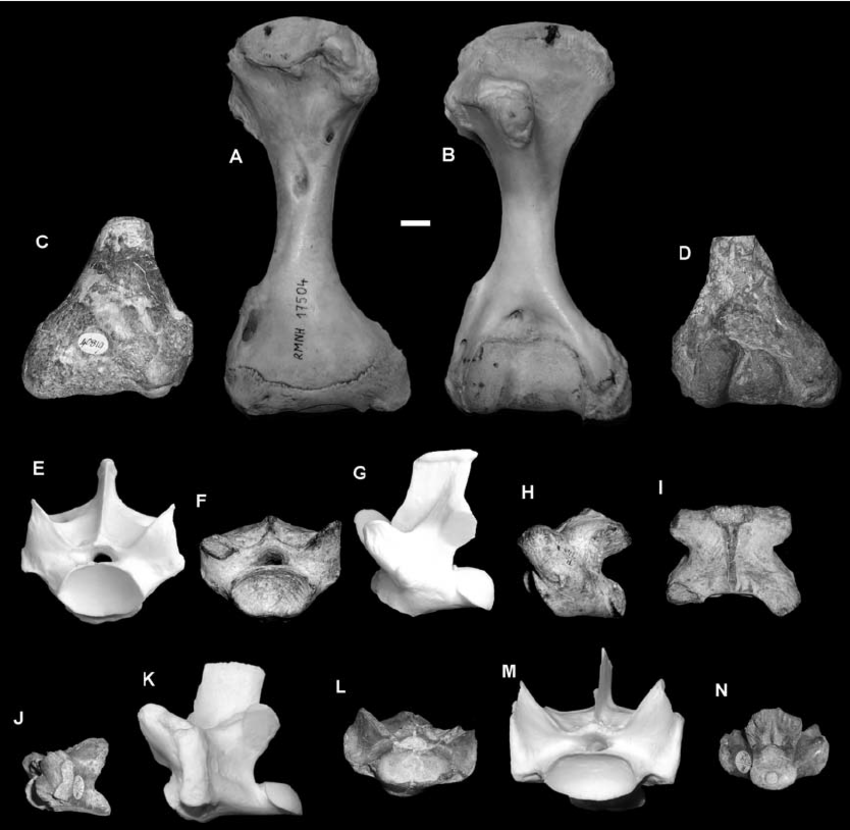
- Humerus and Dorsal Vertebrae

Scientific classification
- Kingdom: Animalia
- Phylum: Chordata
- Class: Reptilia
- Order: Squamata
- Suborder: Anguimorpha
- Family: Varanidae
- Genus: Varanus
- Species: †V. sivalensis

Binomial name
- †Varanus sivalensis Falconer, 1858

= Varanus sivalensis =

Varanus sivalensis Temporal range: Pliocene to Pleistocene, 2.58–0.6 Ma

Extinct species of large lizard from India

Varanus sivalensis is an extinct species of monitor lizard that originally lived in India in the Pinjor Formation during the Pliocene through the late Pleistocene. As its name implies, it was broadly comparable in size to the extant Komodo dragon.
