= Oreonagor =

Oreonagor Temporal range: Pliocene

Scientific classification
- Domain: Eukaryota
- Kingdom: Animalia
- Phylum: Chordata
- Class: Mammalia
- Order: Artiodactyla
- Family: Bovidae
- Subfamily: Alcelaphinae
- Genus: †Oreonagor; Arambourg, 1979

Type species
- Oreonagor tournoueri

Extinct genus of mammals

Oreonagor is an extinct genus of bovid that lived in North Africa during the Pliocene. It is known from a single species, O. tournoueri.

== Distribution ==
Oreonagor tournoueri remains have been found at the Piacenzian site of Ain Boucherit in Algeria.
