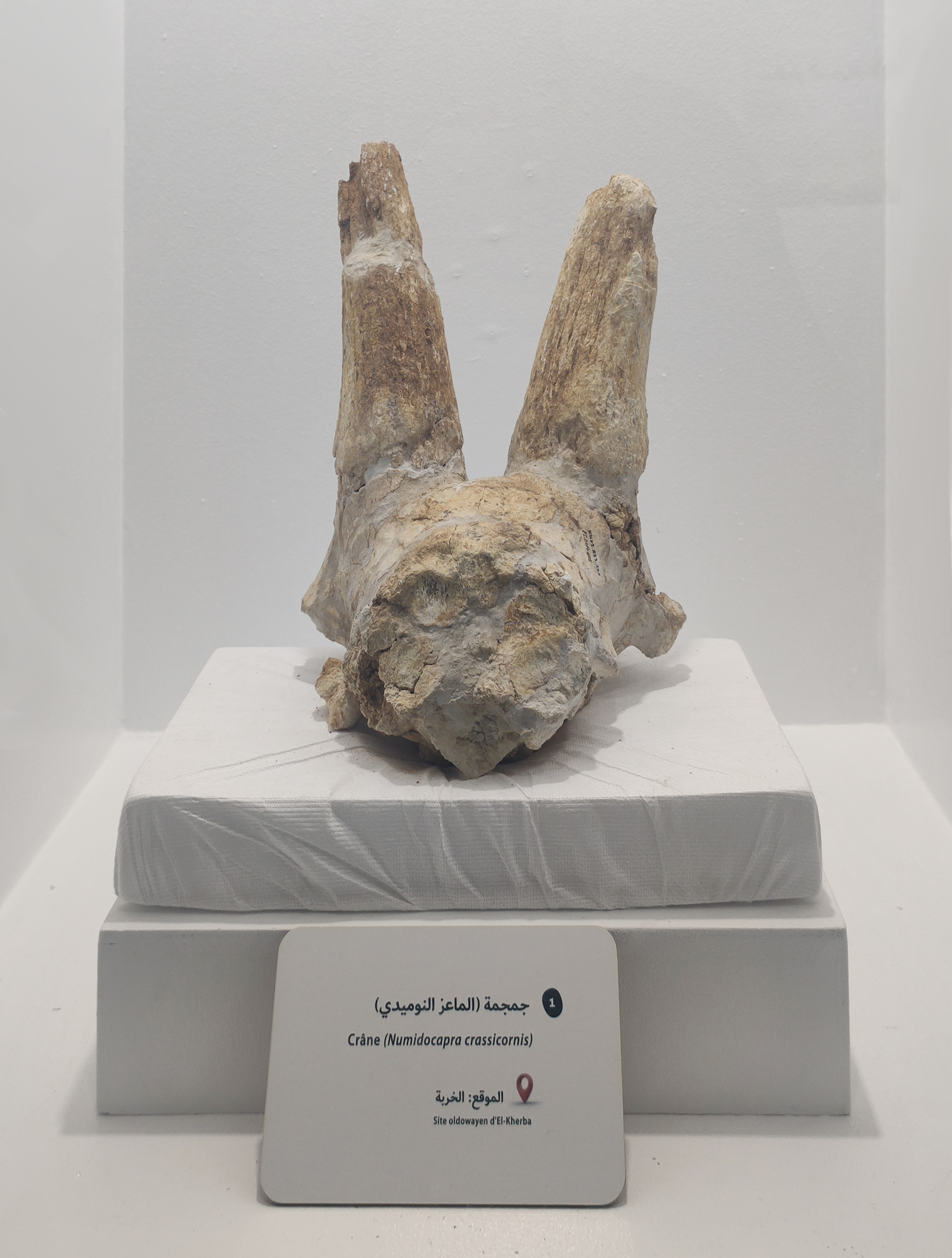
- Numidocapra crassicornis in the Bardo National Museum of Algiers

Scientific classification
- Kingdom: Animalia
- Phylum: Chordata
- Class: Mammalia
- Infraclass: Placentalia
- Order: Artiodactyla
- Family: Bovidae
- Subfamily: Alcelaphinae
- Genus: †Numidocapra; Arambourg, 1949

Type species
- Numidocapra crassicornis Arambourg, 1949

Species
- N. arambourgi; N. crassicornis; N. porrocornutus

Synonyms
- Rabaticeras

= Numidocapra =

Numidocapra Temporal range: Early - Mid Pleistocene

Extinct genus of mammal

Numidocapra is an extinct genus of bovid from the Pleistocene of Africa.

== Taxonomy ==
Originally placed in the subfamily Caprinae, Numidocapra is now generally classified as a member of the subfamily Alcelaphinae. Three species are considered valid. Numidocapra arambourgi was originally placed in its own genus, Rabaticeras. It was at one point considered an ancestor of the hartebeest, but this is not considered likely anymore. Another species, N. porrocornutus, was previously placed in Damaliscus.

== Description ==
These bovids had narrow, tall skulls typical of alcelaphines. The braincase roof is sloping with a straight profile. Their horns were curved upwards and forwards in side view, with frontals slightly raised at the horn bases. Numidocapra crassicornis was the largest member of the genus, probably around the size of a wildebeest. It had long, upright horn cores that ran parallel to each other, while Numidocapra arambourgi was smaller and had diverging, twisted horns.
