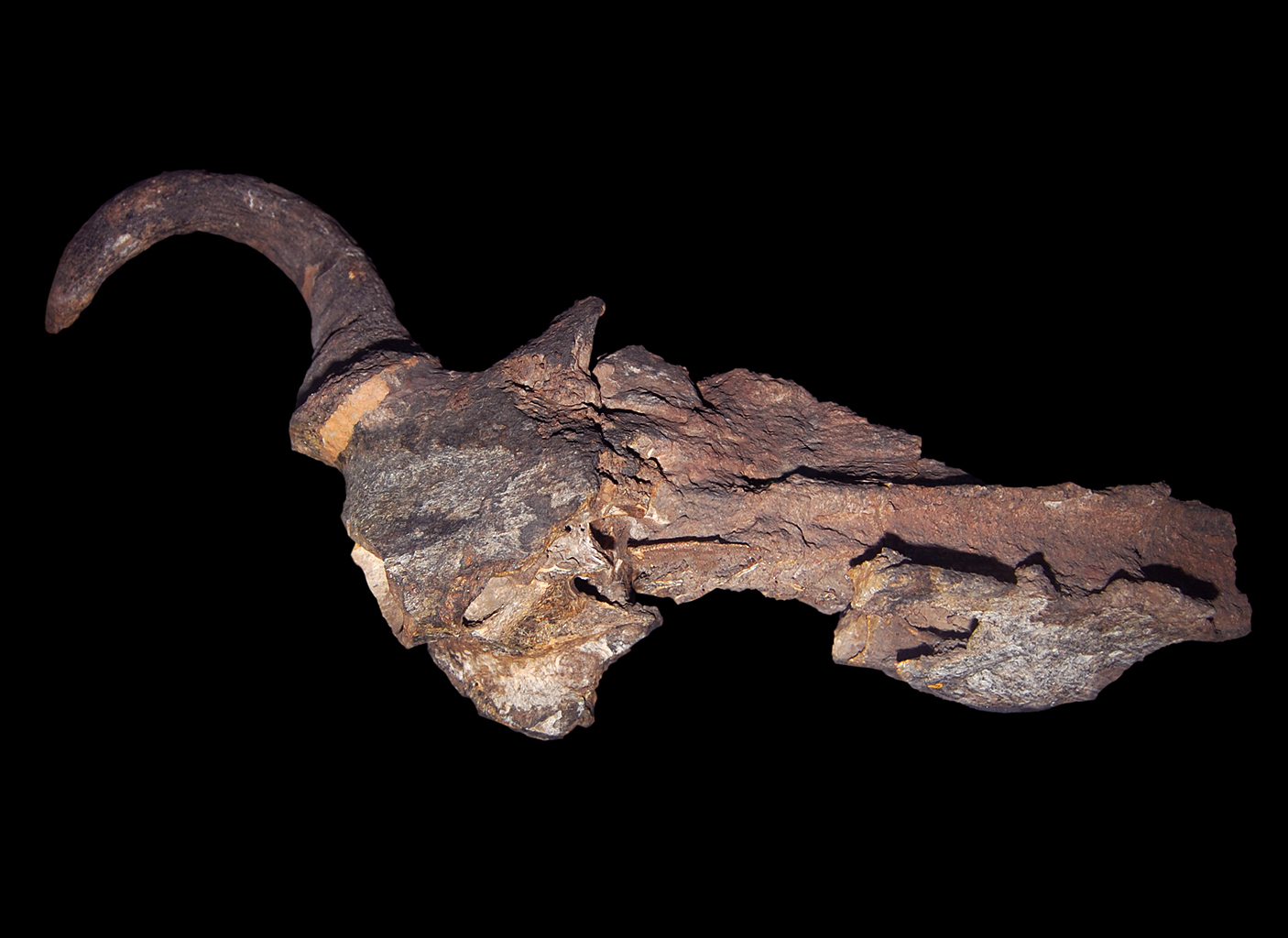
- Megalotragus kattwinkeli skull

Scientific classification
- Kingdom: Animalia
- Phylum: Chordata
- Class: Mammalia
- Order: Artiodactyla
- Family: Bovidae
- Subfamily: Antilopinae
- Tribe: Alcelaphini
- Genus: †Megalotragus van Hoepen, 1932

Type species
- †Megalotragus kattwinkeli

Species
- M. issaci Harris, 1991; M. kattwinkeli; M. priscus Broom, 1909

= Megalotragus =

Megalotragus Temporal range: Pliocene - early Holocene, 5–0.0055 Ma

Extinct genus of mammals

Megalotragus (from Greek mega (μέγα) 'great' and tragos (τράγος) 'goat') is an extinct genus of very large alcelaphines that lived from the Pliocene to early Holocene of Africa, though an indeterminate species is also known to occur in Pinjor Formation of Sivalik Hills, Indo-Pakistan subcontinent. Its skull resembled that of modern hartebeests, but it differed in having a larger body size and wildebeest-like proportions. Megalotragus includes some of the largest bovid species in the subfamily Alcelaphinae, reaching a shoulder height of 1.4 m (4.6 ft). The genus consists of three species of which Megalotragus priscus survived until the early Holocene 7.500 C14yBP.

== Description ==
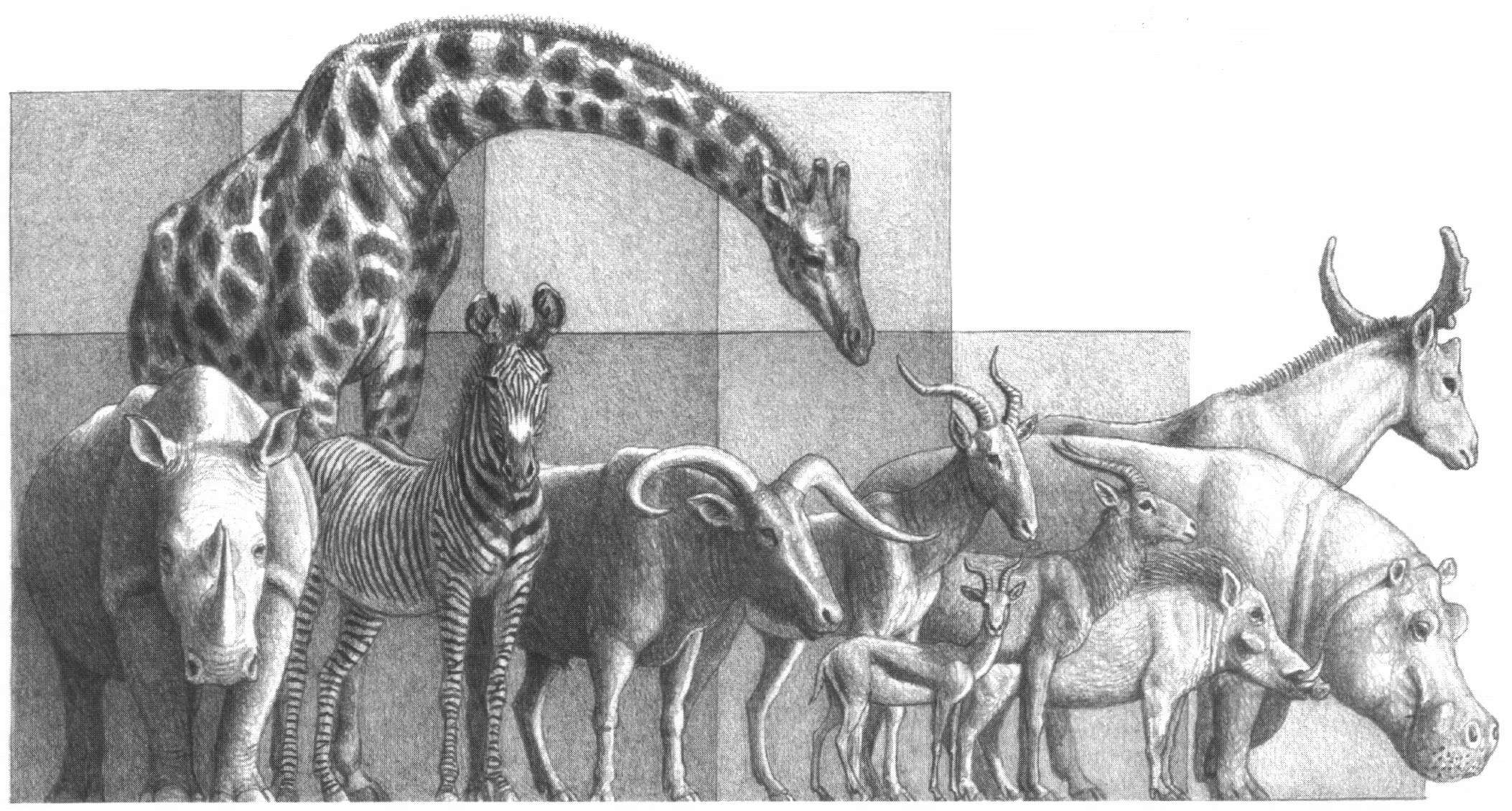
Ungulates from the Pleistocene of Eastern Africa, including M. issaci

With a distance between the tips of its horns of around 1.2 m (3 ft 11 in), Megalotragus is probably the largest alcelaphine bovid ever recorded, much bigger than the extant wildebeest. The skull of Megalotragus is similar to that of the hartebeest: characterized by extreme elongation, and the fusion and posterior placement of the horn pedicels. However, its postcrania and proportions are largely reminiscent of wildebeest: for instance, axes from Megalotragus are robust and compact, suggesting it had a robust, muscular neck that was likely held horizontally, much like black wildebeest.

The nasal region of Megalotragus (with the exception of Megalotragus priscus) is inflated and forms a domed structure. This is similar to the related Rusingoryx (once included in Megalotragus) but not as extreme. The type species M. kattwinkeli has relatively short, curved horns. M. isaaci possessed longer horns, while M. priscus possessed the longest horns of all three species.

== Palaeobiology ==
=== Palaeoecology ===
The δ^{44/42}Ca values of Megalotragus bioapatite from the Turkana Basin suggest that browsing made up a slightly more important component of its diet compared to that of extant alcelaphines. A mesowear analysis of Megalotragus sp. molars from the Sivalik Hills found mostly low occlusal relief and rounded cusps, a wear pattern that is associated with grazing, resulting in the authors classifying the genus as a strong grazer, they also noted that this agree with mesowear analysis of Megalotragus priscus, and also use Megalotragus sp. to indicate a savannah-type grasslands in the Pinjor Formation.
