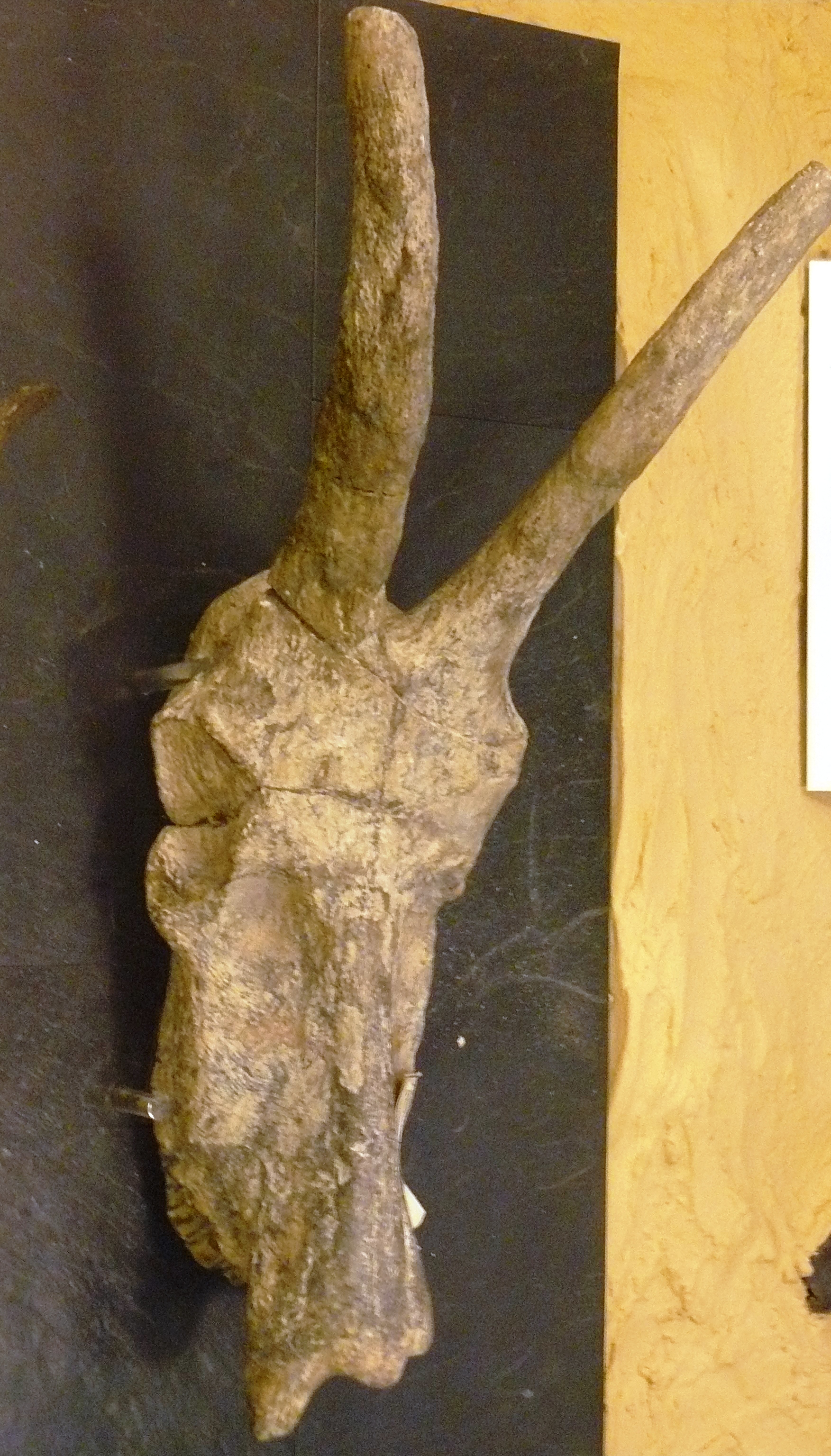
- Damalops palaeindicus

Scientific classification
- Kingdom: Animalia
- Phylum: Chordata
- Class: Mammalia
- Order: Artiodactyla
- Family: Bovidae
- Subfamily: Alcelaphinae
- Genus: †Damalops; Pilgrim, 1939
- Species: †D. palaeindicus

Binomial name
- †Damalops palaeindicus Pilgrim, 1939

= Damalops =

Damalops Temporal range: Pliocene – Pleistocene

Extinct genus of mammals

Damalops is an extinct genus of alcelaphine antelope. It lived during the Pliocene and Pleistocene in southern Asia, where the species Damalops palaeindicus is known from the Siwaliks in the northern part of the Indian Subcontinent.

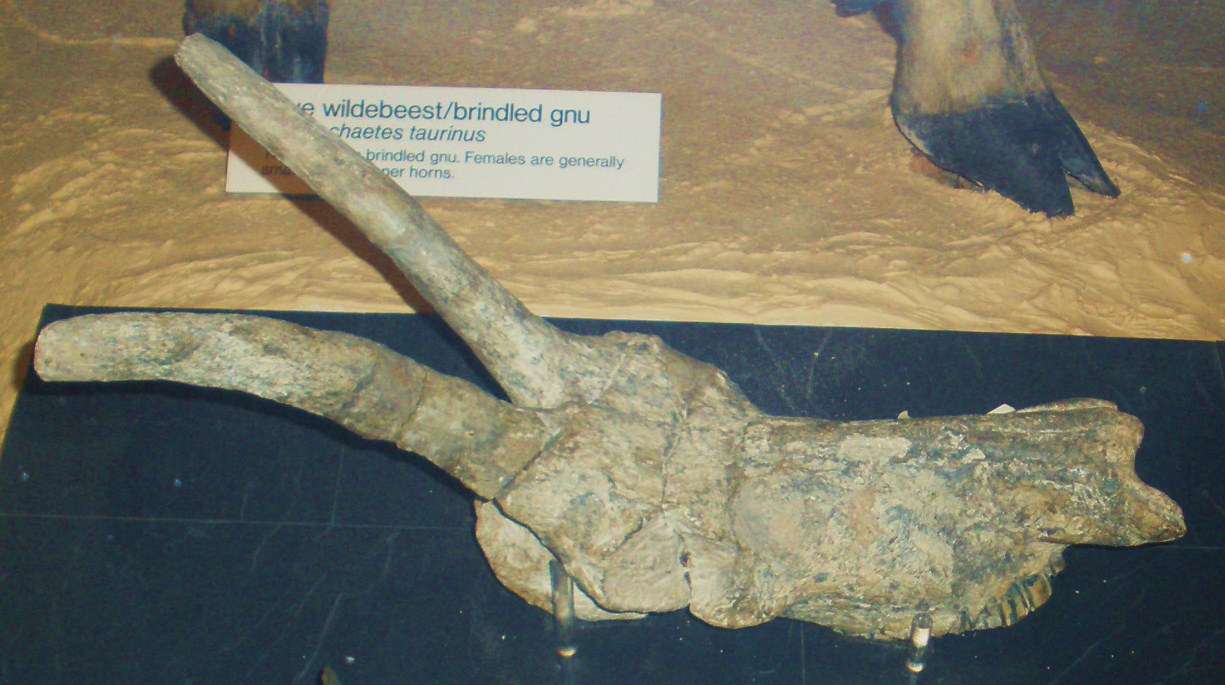
Skull

== Description ==
Damalops was a large sized alcelaphine, with an adult weight weighing between 125–342 kilograms (276–754 lb).
