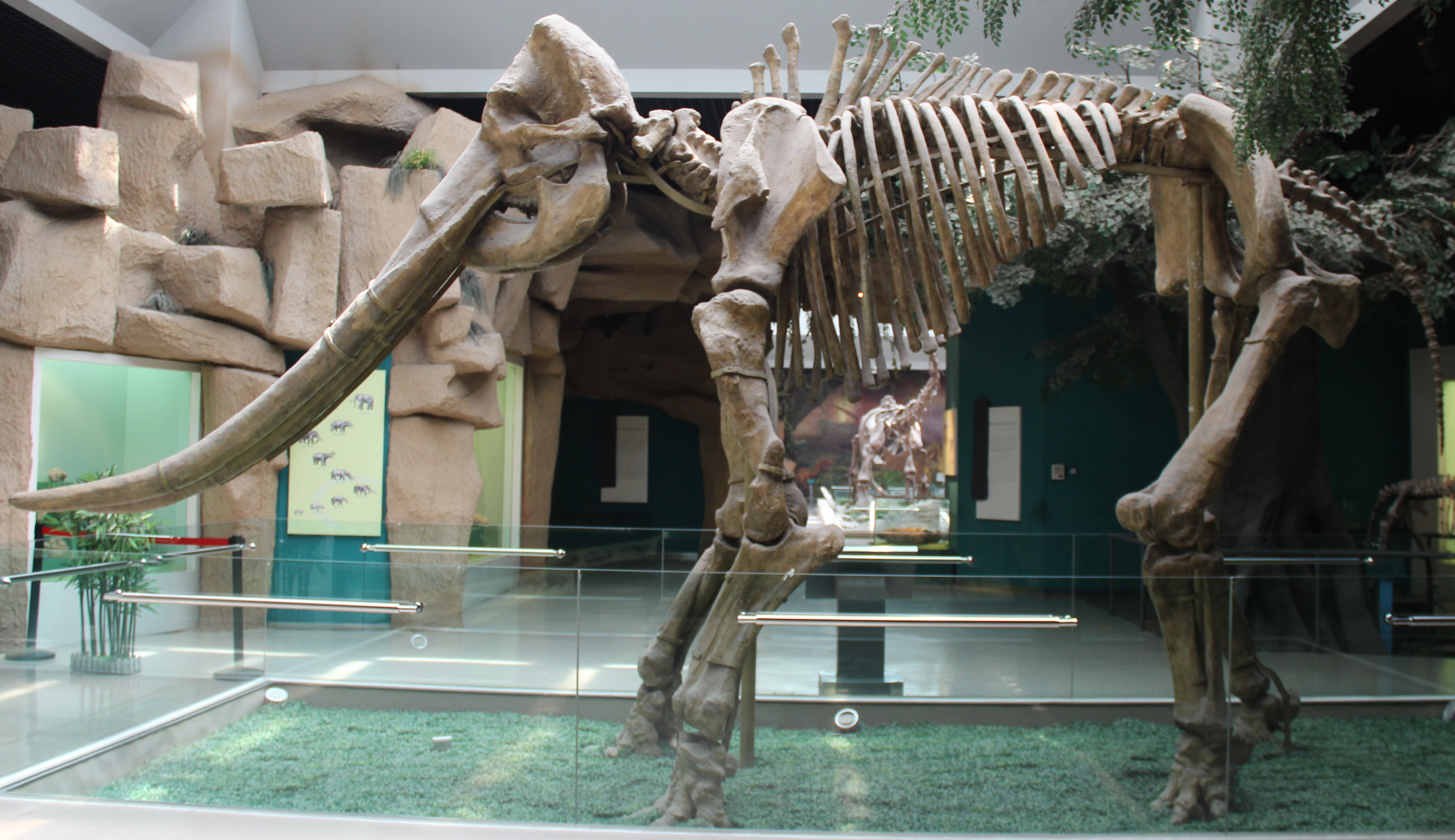
- Stegodon skeleton at the Gansu Provincial Museum

Scientific classification
- Kingdom: Animalia
- Phylum: Chordata
- Class: Mammalia
- Order: Proboscidea
- Family: †Stegodontidae
- Genus: †Stegodon; Falconer, 1857

Species
- †S. aurorae Matsumoto, 1918; †S. elephantoides Clift, 1828; †S. florensis Hooijer, 1957; †S. ganesha Faloner & Cautley, 1846; †S. kaisensis Hopwood, 1939; †S. luzonensis von Koenigswald, 1956; †S. miensis Matsumoto, 1941; †S. mindanensis Naumann, 1890; †S. orientalis Owen, 1870; †S. protoaurorae Aiba et al., 2010; †S. sompoensis Hooijer, 1964; †S. sondaari van den Bergh, 1999; †S. trigonocephalus Martin, 1887; †S. zdanskyi Hopwood, 1935

= Stegodon =

Stegodon Temporal range: Late Miocene–Late Pleistocene, 11.6–0.012 Ma

Genus of extinct proboscidean

Stegodon (Note: from the Ancient Greek στέγω (stégō), meaning 'to cover', and ὀδούς (odoús), meaning 'tooth', named for the distinctive ridges on the animal's molars) is an extinct genus of proboscidean, related to elephants. It was originally assigned to the family Elephantidae along with modern elephants but is now placed in the extinct family Stegodontidae. Like elephants, Stegodon had teeth with plate-like lophs that are different from those of more primitive proboscideans like gomphotheres and mammutids.

Fossils of the genus are known from Africa and across much of Asia, as far southeast as Timor, with a single record in southeastern Europe. The oldest fossils of the genus are found in Late Miocene strata in Asia, likely originating from the more archaic Stegolophodon, subsequently migrating into Africa. While the genus became extinct in Africa during the Pliocene, Stegodon persisted in South, Southeast and Eastern Asia into the Late Pleistocene.

== Morphology ==
The skull of Stegodon is relatively tall top to bottom but short front to back, and similar in many respects to those of living elephants. The lower jaw in comparison to early elephantimorphs and its ancestor Stegolophodon is shortened (brevirostrine), and lacks lower tusks/incisors. The molar teeth are superficially like those of elephants, consisting of parallel lamellae that form ridges but are generally relatively low crowned (brachydont), the numbers of ridges are greater in later species. Members of the genus lack permanent premolars. The tusks are proportionally large, with those of the biggest species being among the largest known tusks in proboscideans, with a particularly large tusk of S. ganesa from the Early Pleistocene of India measured to be 3.89 metres (12.8 ft) long, with an estimated mass of approximately 140 kilograms (310 lb), substantially larger than the largest recorded modern elephant tusk. These tusks have a slight upward curvature, and project forwards and parallel to each other, with the tusks often so close together that they are almost touching, such that the trunk would probably have had to rest on top of the tusks rather than be freely hanging between them as in living elephants.

Stegodon molars
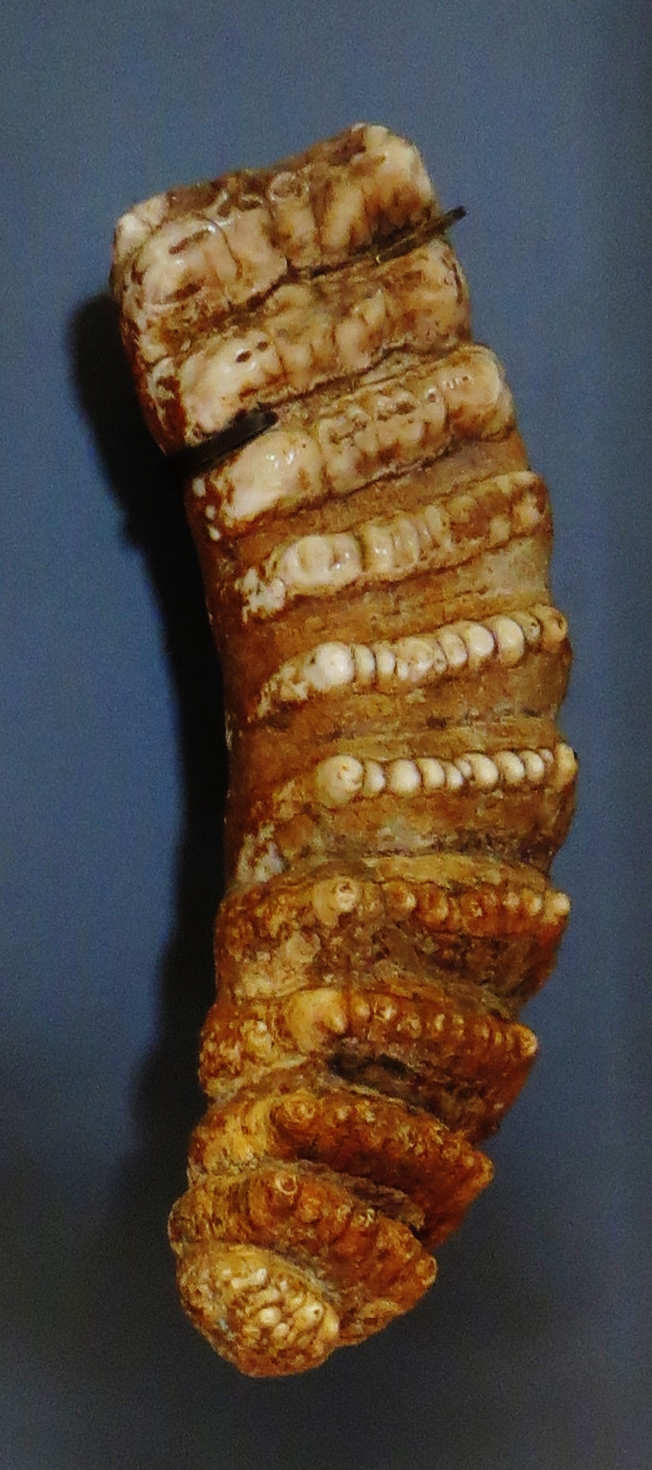
Molar of Stegodon orientalis

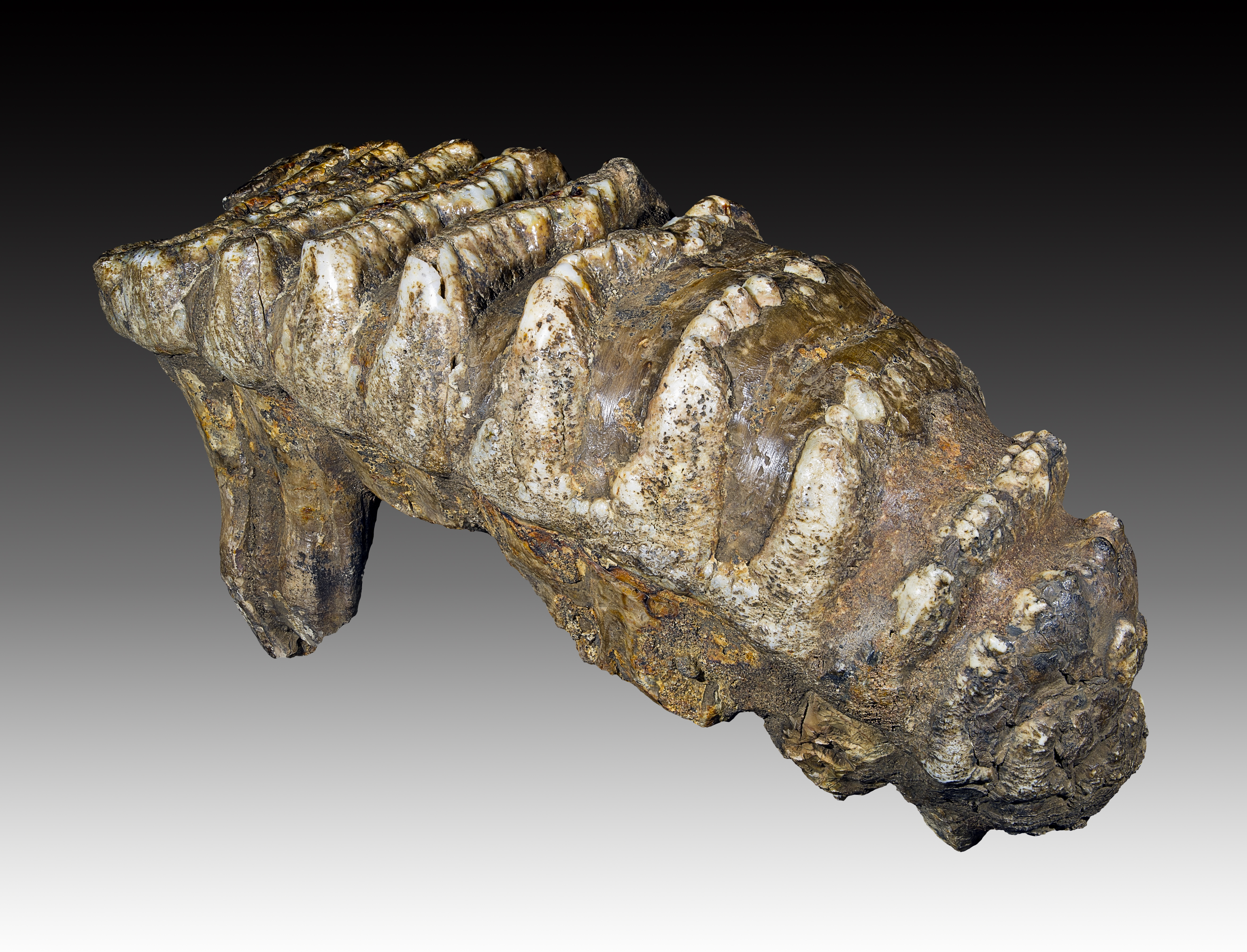
Molar of Stegodon trigonocephalus

=== Size ===
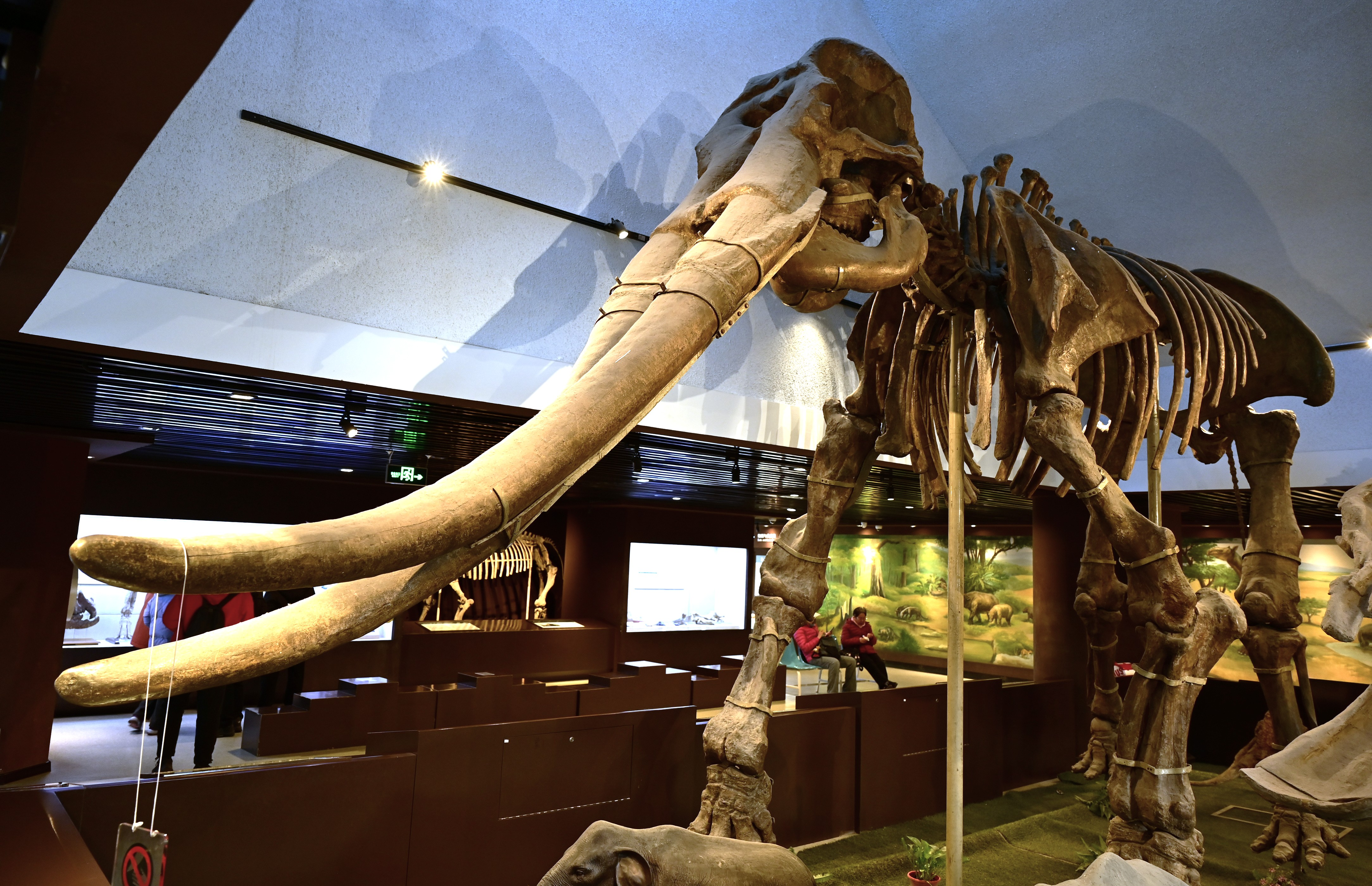
Yellow River specimen of S. zdanskyi (IVPP V4710-4750), Paleozoological Museum of China

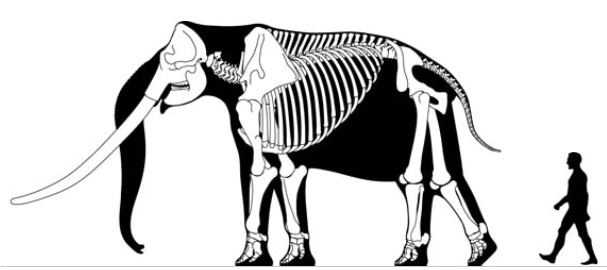
Skeletal restoration of a large male S. zdanskyi with a shoulder height of around 3.87 metres

The Chinese S. zdanskyi is suggested to be the largest species, and is known from an old male (50-plus years old) from the Yellow River that is 3.87 m (12.7 ft) tall and would have weighed approximately 12.7 tonnes (12.5 long tons; 14.0 short tons) in life. It had a humerus 1.21 m (4.0 ft) long, a femur 1.46 m (4.8 ft) long, and a pelvis 2 m (6.6 ft) wide. The Indian S. ganesa is suggested to have a shoulder height of about 3.10 m (10.2 ft), and a body mass of around 6.5 tonnes (6.4 long tons; 7.2 short tons). The Javanese species S. trigonocephalus is suggested to have been around 2.75–2.8 m (9.0–9.2 ft) tall, with a body mass of around 5 tonnes (4.9 long tons; 5.5 short tons). S. orientalis was around the size of an Asian elephant (Elephas maximus).

==== Dwarf species ====
Estimated sizes of dwarf Stegodon species from Flores compared to a human (Note: silhouette is based on much larger S. zdanskyi and is not meant to accurately depict the specific body proportions of these species)

Similar to modern-day elephants, stegodonts were likely good swimmers, allowing them to disperse to remote islands in Indonesia, the Philippines and Japan. Once present on the islands, due to the process of insular dwarfism, as a result of decreased land area and the reduction of predation and competition pressure, they reduced in body size, with the degree of dwarfism varying between islands as the result of local conditions. One of the smallest species, Stegodon sumbaensis from Sumba in Indonesia, is estimated at around 8% of the size of mainland Stegodon species, with a body mass of 250 kilograms (550 lb). Sometimes the same island was colonised multiple times by Stegodon, as in Flores, where the Early Pleistocene strongly dwarfed species Stegodon sondaari, which was 120 cm (3.9 ft) tall at the shoulder and weighed about 350–400 kilograms (770–880 lb), was replaced by the species Stegodon florensis during the Middle Pleistocene which was initially substantially larger, but progressively reduced in size over time, with the earlier subspecies Stegodon florensis florensis from the Middle Pleistocene estimated to be around 50% the size of mainland Stegodon species with a shoulder height of around 190 cm (6.2 ft) and a body mass of around 1.7 tons, while the later Stegodon florensis insularis from the Late Pleistocene is estimated to be around 17% the size of mainland Stegodon species, with a shoulder height of around 130 cm (4.3 ft), and a body mass of about 570 kilograms (1,260 lb).

During Pliocene-Early Pleistocene (from around 4–1 million years ago), a succession of endemic dwarf species of Stegodon, probably representing a single lineage lived in the Japanese archipelago, probably derived from the mainland Chinese S. zdanskyi. In chronological succession these species are Stegodon miensis (4–3 million years ago) Stegodon protoaurorae (3–2 million years ago) and Stegodon aurorae, (2–1 million years ago) which show a progressive size reduction through time, possibly as a result of reducing land area of the Japanese archipelago. The latest and smallest species S. aurorae is estimated to be 25% the size of its mainland ancestor with a body mass of around 2,122 kilograms (4,678 lb). S. aurorae also shows morphological traits associated with dwarfism, like shortened limbs.

== Palaeobiology ==
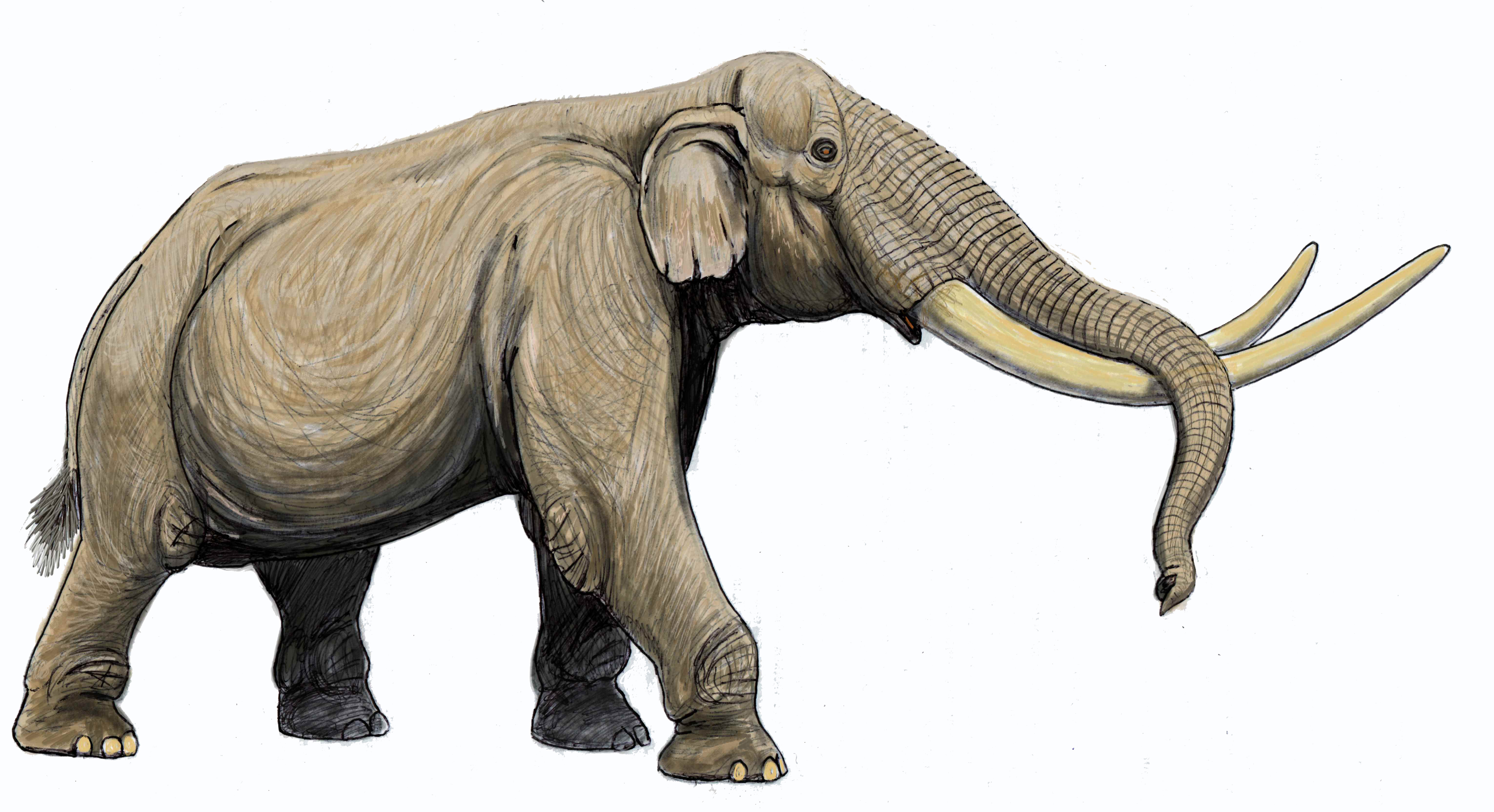
Life restoration of the Indian species Stegodon ganesha

Like modern elephants, but unlike more primitive proboscideans, Stegodon is thought to have chewed using a proal movement (a forward stroke from the back to the front) of the lower jaws. This jaw movement is thought to have evolved independently in elephants and stegodontids. Stegodon populations from the Late Pliocene of the India (including Stegodon insignis) are suggested to have been variable mixed feeders, while those from the earliest Pleistocene (including Stegodon ganesa) of the same region are suggested to have been nearly pure grazers based on isotopic analysis. Based on dental microwear analysis, populations of Stegodon from the Pleistocene of China (Stegodon orientalis and Stegodon huananensis) and mainland southeast Asia (S. orientalis) were found to be browsers, with clear niche differentiation from sympatric Elephas populations, which tended towards mixed feeding (both browsing and grazing), though isotopic analysis of Stegodon cf. orientalis specimens from the late Middle Pleistocene of Thailand suggests that these individuals were mixed feeders that consumed a significant amount of C_{4} grass. Specimens of Stegodon trigonocephalus from the Early-Middle Pleistocene of Java were found to be mixed feeders to grazers, with a diet similar to that of sympatric Elephas hysudrindicus. The dwarf species from Flores, Stegodon sondaari and Stegodon florensis, are suggested to have been mixed feeders and grazers, respectively, based on stable carbon isotopes. Specimens of Stegodon kaiesensis from the Pliocene of East Africa were found to be browsers to mixed feeders, based on mesowear analysis.

The East-Southeast Asian species Stegodon orientalis is thought to have primarily inhabited densely forested environments though it may have also inhabited somewhat more open forested habitats, while the Javanese Stegodon trigonocephalus is thought to have primarily lived in a mix of open savannah woodland and forest.

On Flores, where dwarf Stegodon species were the only large herbivores, they were likely the main prey of the Komodo dragon. Members of Stegodon florensis and perhaps other Stegodon species may have deliberately entered caves to mourn the dead or for water and minerals.

In the Siwalik Hills assemblage, the Pliocene S. insignis shows a relatively low frequency of enamel hypoplasia, likely due to the relative stability of regional climate during this epoch. The Pleistocene S. ganesha, on the other had, had high rates of enamel hypoplasia that have been attributed to a highly unstable environmental dynamics during the epoch.

Ichnofossils of a group of Stegodon from the Late Pliocene of Japan suggest that like modern elephants, Stegodon were highly social animals and lived together in herds.

== Taxonomy ==
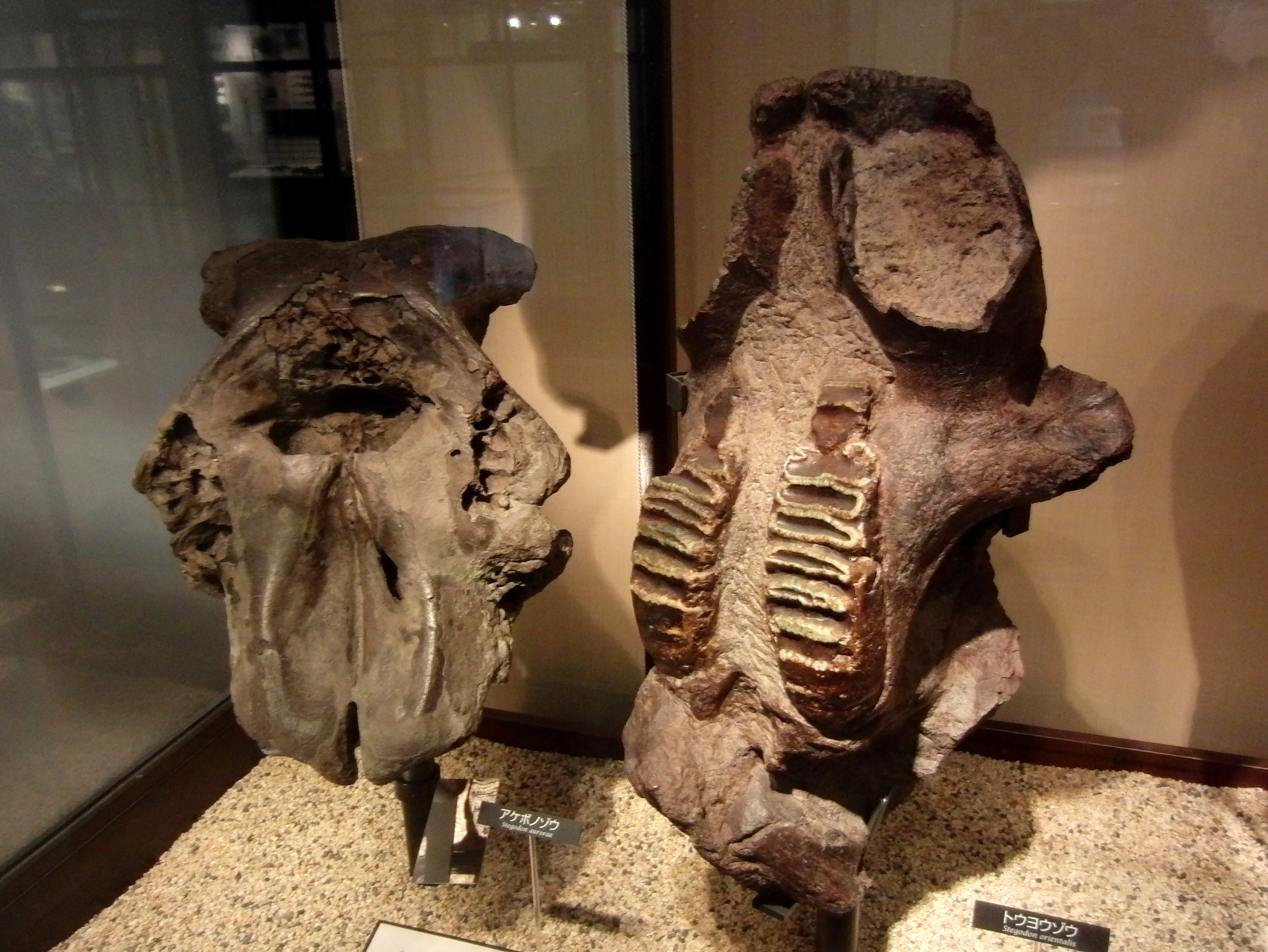
Fossils of S. aurorae (left) and S. orientalis (right) at the National Museum of Nature and Science, Tokyo

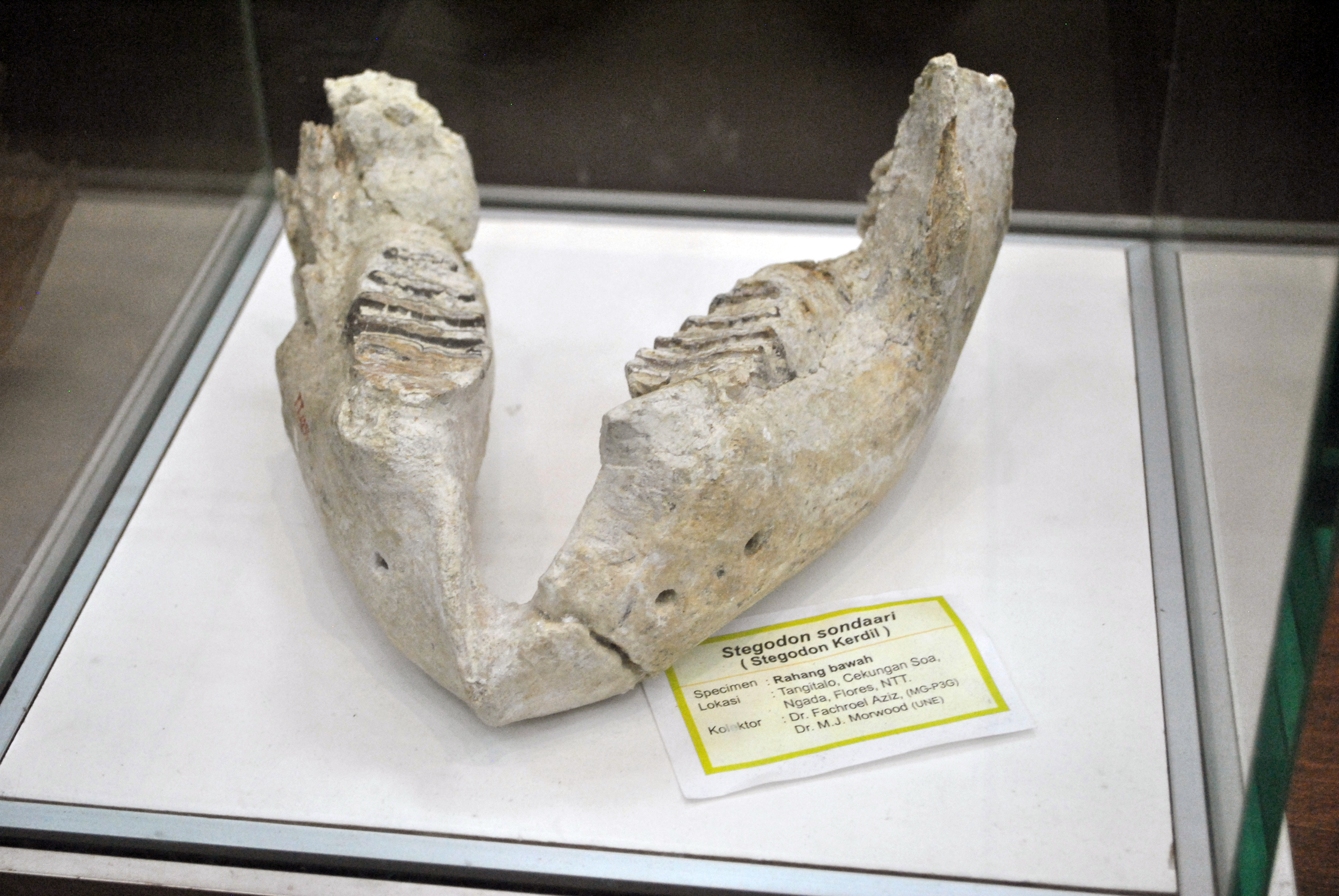
Jaw fossil of S. sondaari at the Bandung Geological Museum

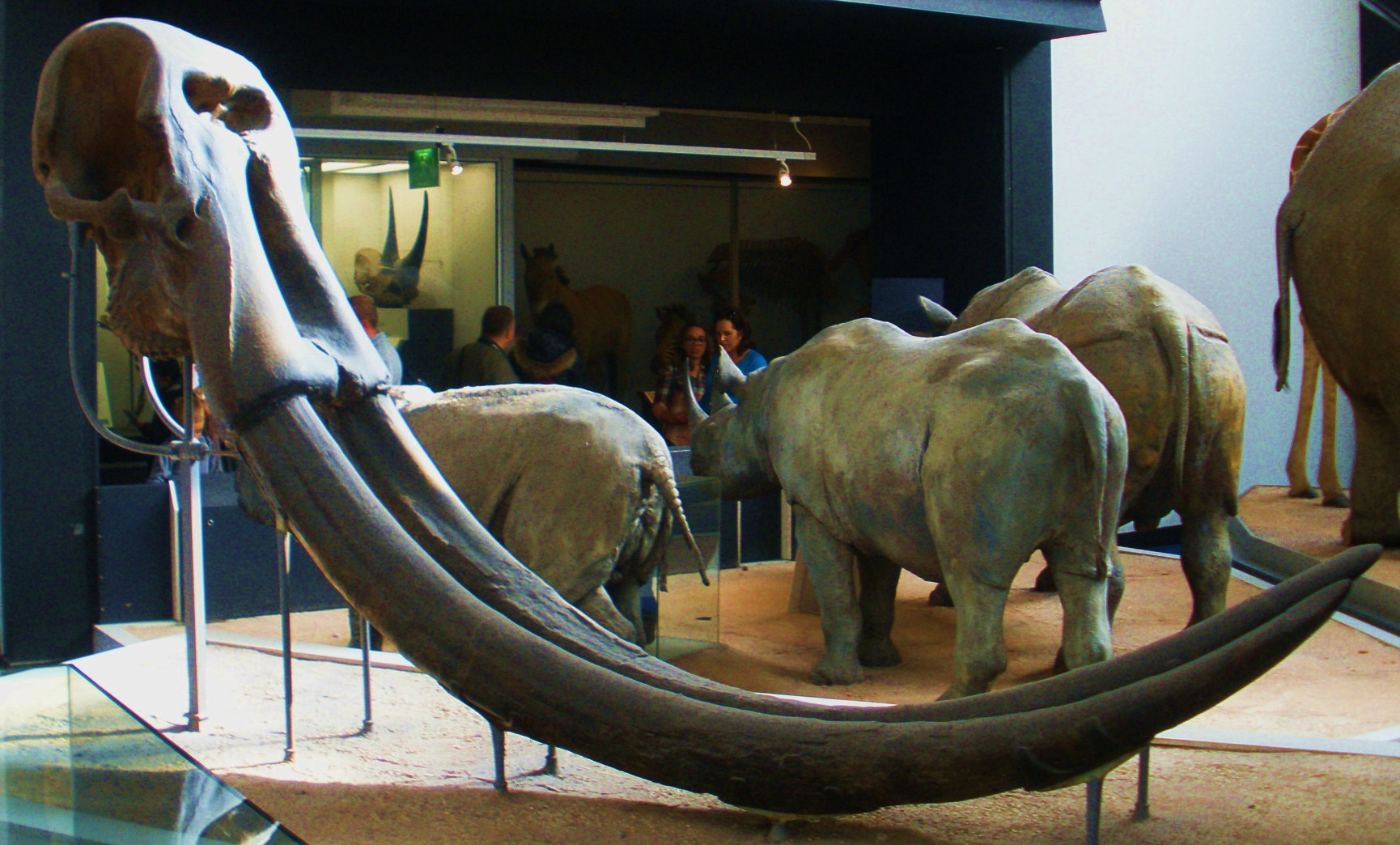
Skull of S. ganesha

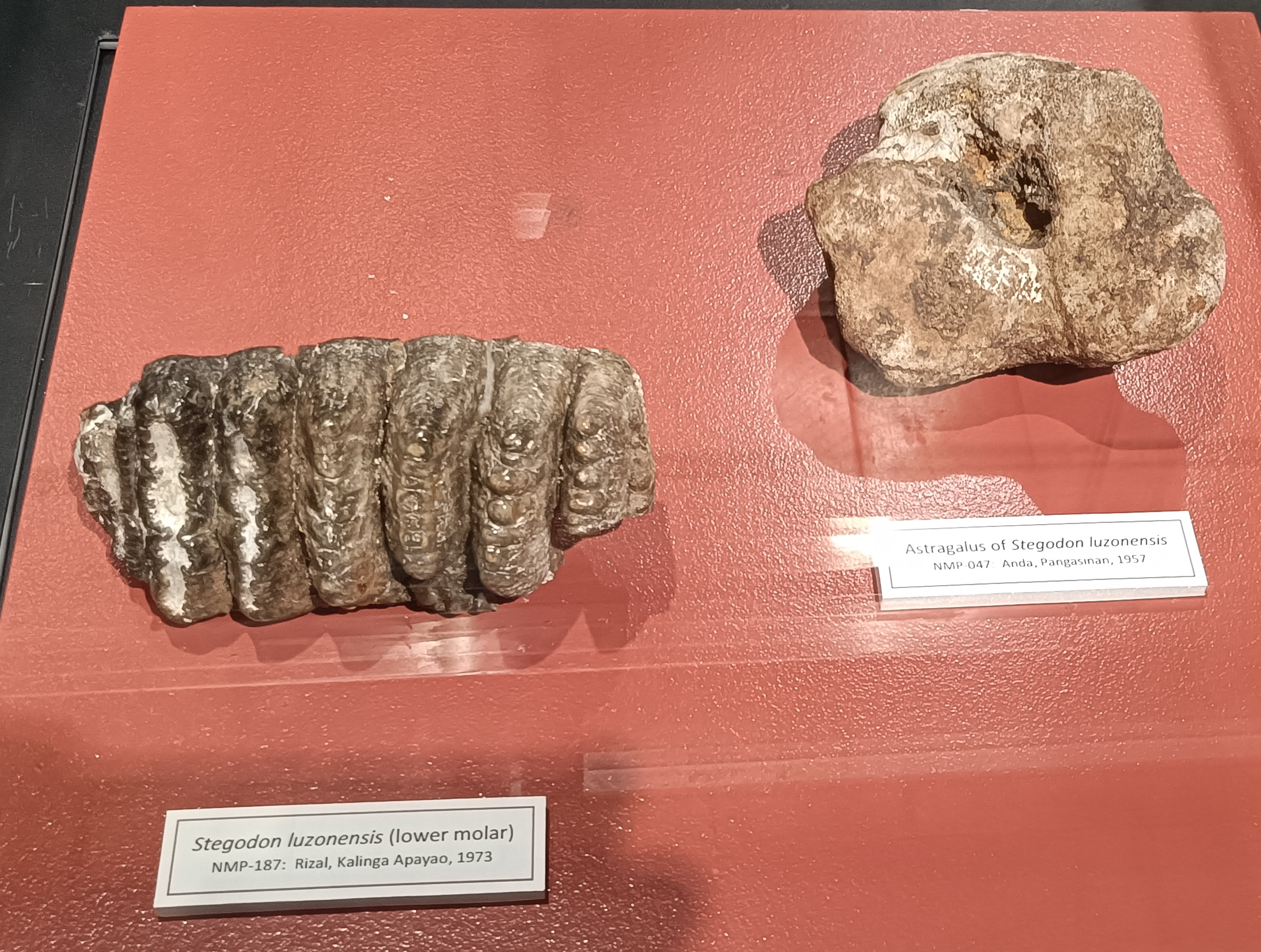
Fossils of S. luzonensis, in display at the National Museum of Natural History (Manila)

Stegodon was named by British palaeontologist Hugh Falconer in 1857, originally as a subgenus of Elephas, the genus which today contains the Asian elephant. Among the first described remains of the genus by Falconer were from the Siwalik Hills of the northern Indian subcontinent, which he assigned to the species Stegodon insignis and Stegodon ganesa, which have since become the subject of taxonomic confusion because of the lack of clearly assigned type specimens and the uncertain stratigraphic provenance of Falconer's collected material. In the past, stegodonts were believed to be the ancestors of the true elephants and mammoths, but currently they are believed to have no modern descendants. Stegodon is likely derived from Stegolophodon, an extinct genus known from the Miocene of Asia, with transitional fossils between the two genera known from the Late Miocene of Southeast Asia and Yunnan in South China, with Stegodon and Stegolophodon collectively placed into the family Stegodontidae. Stegodontidae is placed within the clade Elephantimorpha within Proboscidea, with its exact position in the group being uncertain. Many studies have supported stegodontids as more closely related to modern elephants than to true mastodons of the family Mammutidae, though some studies have found other positions, with one 2025 study finding (albeit with weak support) stegodontids more closely related to Mammutidae than to elephants. Stegodontids are believed to have derived from gomphotheres, with Gomphotherium annectens having been suggested to be the ancestor of Stegolophodon by some authors.

=== List of species ===
- Stegodon kaisensis Late Miocene – Pliocene, Africa
- Stegodon zdanskyi Late Miocene – Pliocene, China
- Stegodon huananensis Early Pleistocene, China
- Stegodon orientalis Middle – Late Pleistocene, China, Southeast Asia, Japan, Taiwan
- Stegodon namadicus/S. insignis/S. ganesa Pliocene – Late Pleistocene, India
- Stegodon miensis Pliocene, Japan
- Stegodon protoaurorae Late Pliocene – Early Pleistocene, Japan
- Stegodon aurorae Early Pleistocene – early Middle Pleistocene, Japan
- Stegodon sondaari Early Pleistocene, Flores, Indonesia
- Stegodon florensis Middle – Late Pleistocene, Flores, Indonesia
- Stegodon luzonensis Middle Pleistocene, Luzon, Philippines
- Stegodon trigonocephalus late Early Pleistocene – early Late Pleistocene, Java, Indonesia
- Stegodon sompoensis Late Pliocene – Early Pleistocene, Sulawesi, Indonesia
- Stegodon sumbaensis Middle – Late Pleistocene, Sumba, Indonesia
- Stegodon timorensis Middle Pleistocene, Timor, Indonesia
- Stegodon mindanensis Pleistocene Mindanao, Philippines

An indeterminate Stegodon molar of an uncertain locality and age is known from Greece, representing the only record of the genus in Europe. Indeterminate remains are also known from the Early Pleistocene and early Middle Pleistocene of Israel.

== Relationship with humans ==
Remains at a number of sites suggest that humans (in a broad sense, including archaic humans) interacted with Stegodon. At a cave deposit on Gele Mountain near Chongqing in southwest China, a mandible of Stegodon orientalis was used to make a handaxe, with dating suggesting the bone is around 170,000 years old. At the late Middle Pleistocene Panxian Dadong cave site in southern Guizhou Province, southwest China, dating to around 300–190,000 years ago, numerous remains of juvenile (0–12 years of age) and a much smaller number of adult remains of adult Stegodon orientalis, representing a minimum of 12 individuals were found at the site in association with stone tools and human remains. It suggested that Stegodon remains were brought to the cave by humans though none of the elements show clear evidence of processing. At the Xinlong Cave site in the Three Gorges area of Chongqing, suggested to date to around 200–130,000 years ago, two Stegodon cf. orientalis tusks have been found along with human remains. These tusks appear to have been deliberately engraved with patterns and are suggested to have been brought into the cave by humans. At the Late Pleistocene Ma'anshan site also in Guizhou, remains of Stegodon orientalis including both adults and juveniles among other animals are found in two layers, the older dating to around 53,000 years Before Present (BP), with the younger dates to around 19,295–31,155 years BP with the minimum number of individuals being 7 and 2 for the older and younger layers respectively, with the older layer containing adults and juveniles while in the younger later only juveniles are present. Bones at the site display cut marks indicating butchery, and are thought to have been accumulated at the site by people, likely by hunting or possibly scavenging in the case of the large adults found in the older layer.

At Liang Bua cave on Flores dating to around 80–50,000 years ago, remains of the dwarf Stegodon species Stegodon florensis are associated with stone tools produced by the dwarf archaic human species Homo floresiensis, with a small number of the bones bearing cut marks. The ambiguous circumstantial association between bones and stone tools, and the rarity of cut marks makes it unclear to what if to any degree, hunting of Stegodon was practiced by Homo floresiensis. A 2026 study suggested that H. floresiensis likely only consumed Stegodon remains in the cave that had already been primarily consumed by Komodo dragons.

== Evolution and extinction ==
The oldest fossils of Stegodon in Asia date to the Late Miocene, around 8–11 million years ago, with the oldest fossils of the genus in Africa being around 7–6 million years old. Stegodon became extinct in Africa during the late Pliocene, around 3 million years ago suggested to be the result of expansion of grassland habitats. The earliest records of Stegodon in Java date to the Early Pleistocene, over 2 million years ago. On the islands of the Philippines, remains of Stegodon are suggested to span from at latest 0.8–1 million years ago until at least 400,000 years ago.

The Javanese species Stegodon trigonocephalus became extinct around 130–80,000 years ago during the latest Middle Pleistocene-early Late Pleistocene (Marine Isotope Stage 5) following a change to more humid conditions, which may have reduced grazing habitat. The last records of Stegodon florensis date to around 50,000 years ago, around the time of arrival of modern humans to Flores (the earliest evidence of which dates to 46,000 years ago), suggesting that effects of modern human activity were likely the cause of their extinction.

Stegodon became extinct in the Indian subcontinent (Stegodon namadicus/Stegodon sp.), mainland Southeast Asia and China (S. orientalis) at some point during the Late Pleistocene epoch, while Asian elephants, which existed in sympatry with Stegodon in these regions, are still extant. The precise timing of extinction is uncertain for these regions, though in India records of Stegodon may date as recently as 35–30,000 years ago, and to at least 30–20,000 years ago for S. orientalis in China, with young records of this age including those from Guangxi southwest China, as well as southern Shaanxi in northern China. The harsh climate of the Last Glacial Maximum may have contributed to the decline of S. orientalis. The survival of the Asian elephant as opposed to Stegodon orientalis in Southeast Asia and South China has been suggested to be due to its more flexible diet in comparison to S. orientalis. Although some authors have claimed a Holocene survival in China for S. orientalis, these claims cannot be substantiated due to loss of specimens and issues regarding dating.
