= Yunnan bush rat =

Conservation status
- Data Deficient (IUCN 3.1)

Scientific classification
- Kingdom: Animalia
- Phylum: Chordata
- Class: Mammalia
- Order: Rodentia
- Family: Muridae
- Genus: Hadromys
- Species: H. yunnanensis

Binomial name
- Hadromys yunnanensis Yang & Wang, 1987

Species of rodent

The Yunnan bush rat (Hadromys yunnanensis) is a species of rodent from the family Muridae. It has just recently been released from synonymy with the Manipur bush rat, and so there is very little information about it. It was recognized as a separate species due to its much larger body size in comparison to the Manipur bush rat, relatively shorter tail, pure white underparts as opposed to gray, significantly shorter diastema, and shorter palate in relation to its skull. It is located only in Yunnan province of the People's Republic of China, where it known only from Tongbiguan Nature Reserve in Ruili City.
