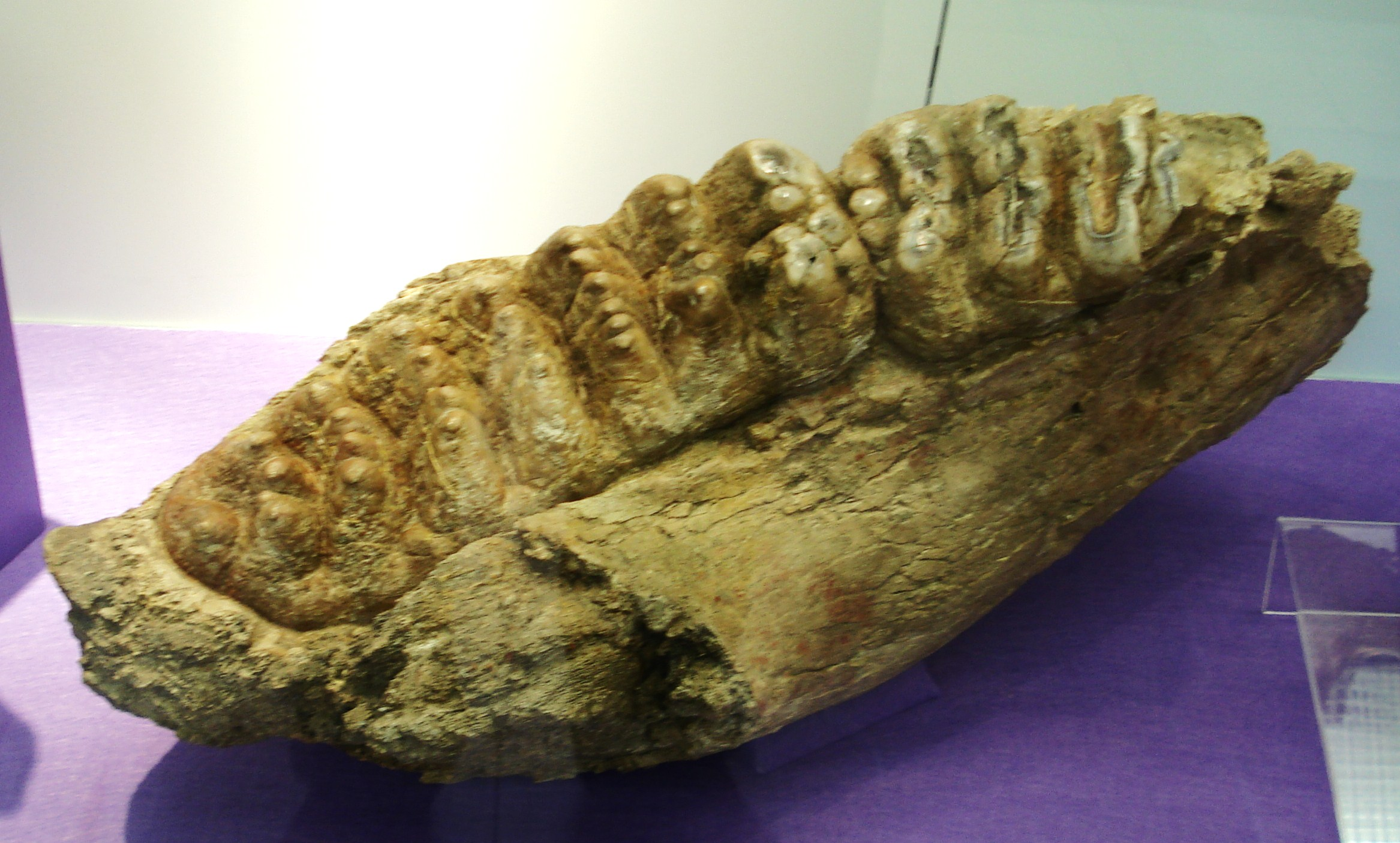
- Tooth of Stegolophodon latidens

Scientific classification
- Kingdom: Animalia
- Phylum: Chordata
- Class: Mammalia
- Infraclass: Placentalia
- Order: Proboscidea
- Family: †Stegodontidae
- Genus: †Stegolophodon; Schlesinger, 1917

Type species
- †Stegolophodon latidens (Clift, 1828) (originally Mastodon latidens)

Species
- S. praelatidens Koenigswald, 1959; S. progressus Osborn, 1929; S. pseudolatidens Saegusa, 2008; S. stegodontoides Pilgrim, 1913; S. cautleyi (Lydekker, 1886)

= Stegolophodon =

Stegolophodon Temporal range: Early–Late Miocene

Genus of extinct elephant-like mammals

Stegolophodon is an extinct genus of stegodontid proboscideans. It lived during the Miocene epoch in Asia. The earliest fossils are known from the Early Miocene, with one of the oldest fossils being from Japan, estimated to be 17.3 million years old. It is suggested to be the ancestor of Stegodon, and transitional fossils between the two genera known from the Late Miocene of Southeast Asia and Yunnan in South China. Like modern elephants, Stegolophodon developed proal jaw movement, where the lower jaw moves in a back-to-front motion, rather than the oblique chewing motion used by earlier proboscideans, with this development already present by 17.3 million years ago. Members of the genus generally have tetralophodont molars, and retain tusks on the lower jaw. The upper tusks have an enamel band.

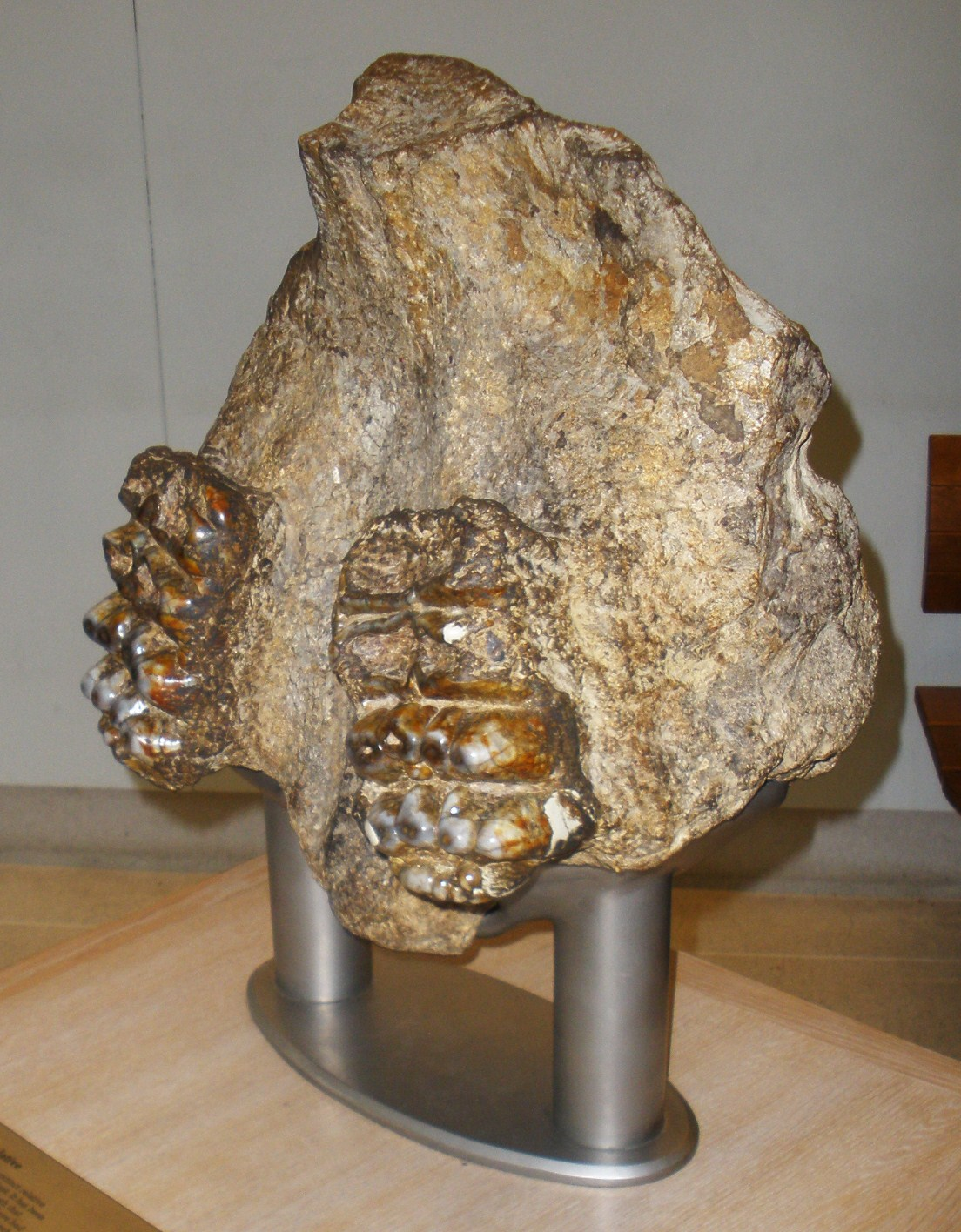
S. cautleyi
