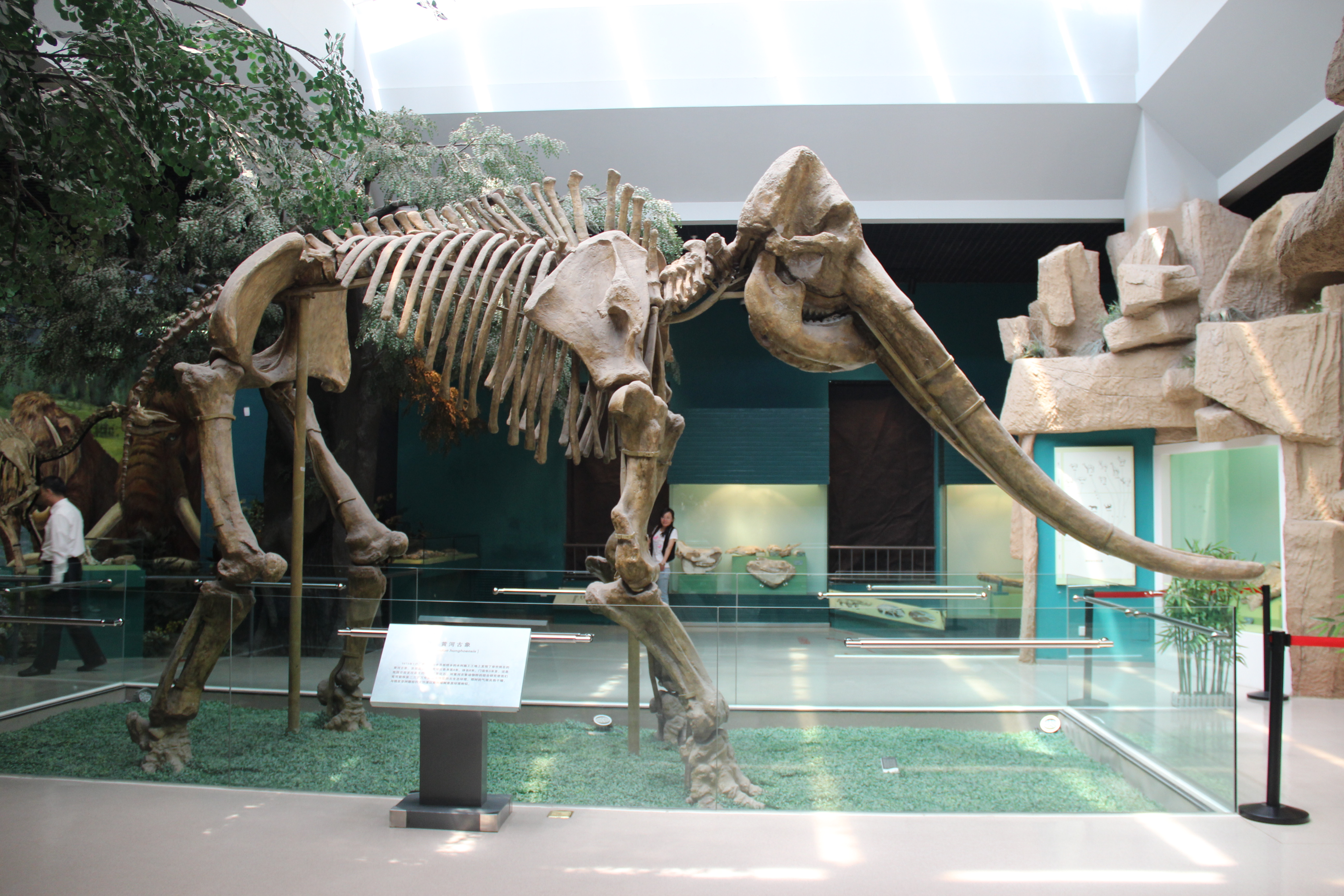
- Stegodon hunghoensis
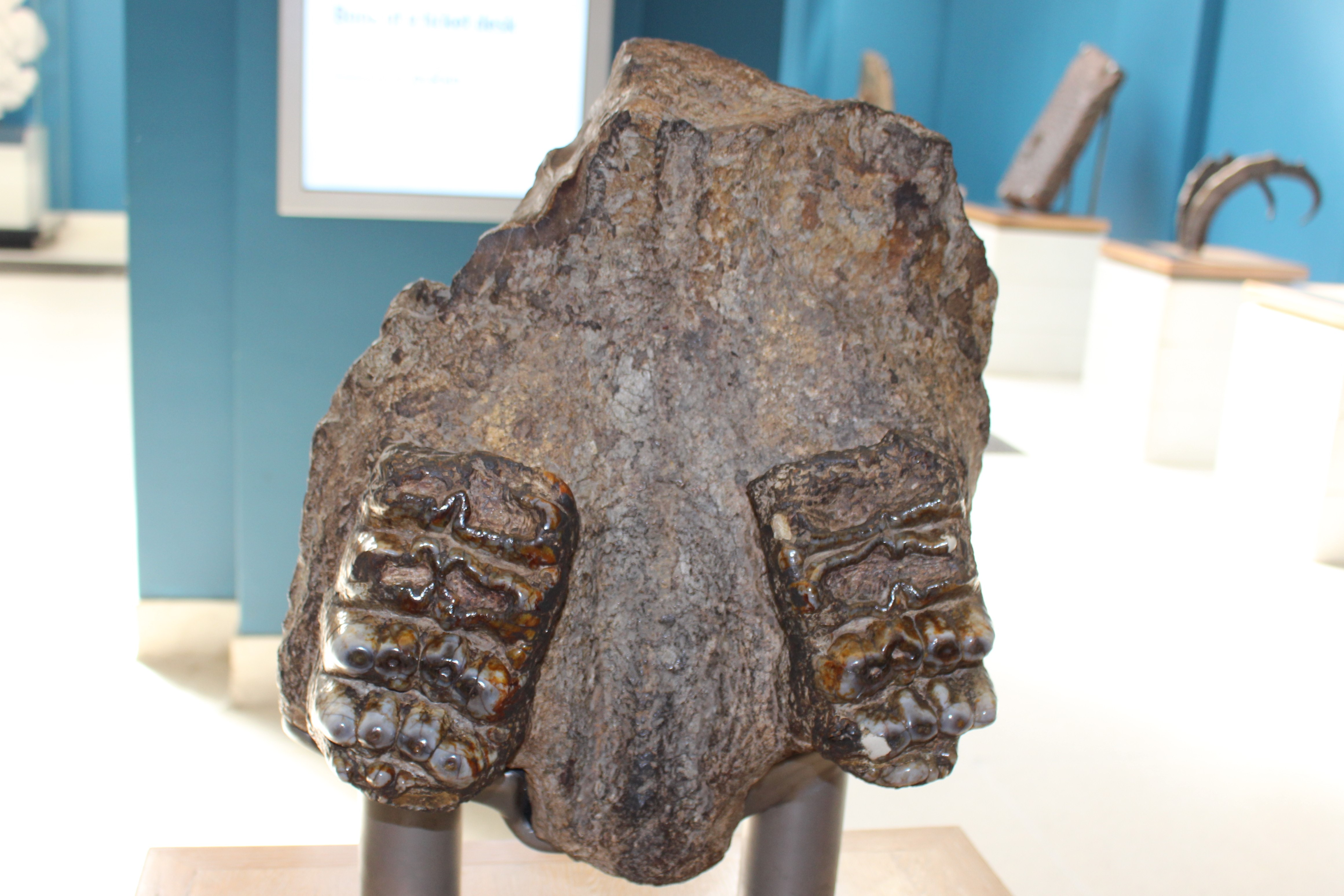
- Stegolophodon cautleyi

Scientific classification
- Kingdom: Animalia
- Phylum: Chordata
- Class: Mammalia
- Order: Proboscidea
- Superfamily: Elephantoidea
- Family: †Stegodontidae; Osborn, 1918

Genera
- †Stegodon; †Stegolophodon

= Stegodontidae =

Stegodontidae Temporal range: Miocene–Late Pleistocene

Family of extinct elephant-like mammals

Stegodontidae (from the Ancient Greek στέγω (stégō), meaning "to cover", and ὀδούς (odoús), meaning "tooth", named for the distinctive ridges on the animal's molars) is an extinct family of proboscideans from Africa and Asia (with a single occurrence in Europe) from the Early Miocene (at least 17.3 million years ago) to the Late Pleistocene. It contains two genera, the earlier Stegolophodon, known from the Miocene of Asia and the later Stegodon, from the Late Miocene to Late Pleistocene of Africa and Asia (with a single occurrence in Greece) which is thought to have evolved from the former. The group is noted for their plate-like lophs on their teeth, which are similar to elephants and different from those of other extinct proboscideans like gomphotheres and mammutids, with both groups having a proal jaw movement utilizing forward strokes of the lower jaw. These similarities with modern elephants were probably convergently evolved. Like elephantids, stegodontids are thought to have evolved from gomphothere ancestors.

== Taxonomy ==
Stegodontidae was named by Osborn (1918). It was assigned to Mammutoidea by Carroll (1988); to Elephantoidea by Lambert and Shoshani (1998); and to Elephantoidea by Shoshani et al. (2006). While Stegodon was historically considered an elephant, this is now largely rejected, with the similarities considered to be convergent. Stegodontidae has often been suggested to be closely related the "tetralophodont gomphotheres" and Elephantidae within Elephantimorpha regardless, though the position of Stegodontidae within Elephantimorpha is uncertain and possibly considerably more basal (early diverging), with a 2025 study recovering with weak support that they were most closely related to Mammutidae (true mastodons). It has been suggested that the lineage of Stegolophodon emerged from that of "Gomphotherium" annectens.
