= Hadromys loujacobsi =

Conservation status
- Extinct

Scientific classification
- Kingdom: Animalia
- Phylum: Chordata
- Class: Mammalia
- Order: Rodentia
- Family: Muridae
- Genus: Hadromys
- Species: †H. loujacobsi

Binomial name
- †Hadromys loujacobsi Musser, 1987

Extinct species of rodent

Hadromys loujacobsi is an extinct species of rat, known only from three molars of early Pleistocene origin. They were found in the Upper Siwalik Group in the Punjab region of Pakistan.
