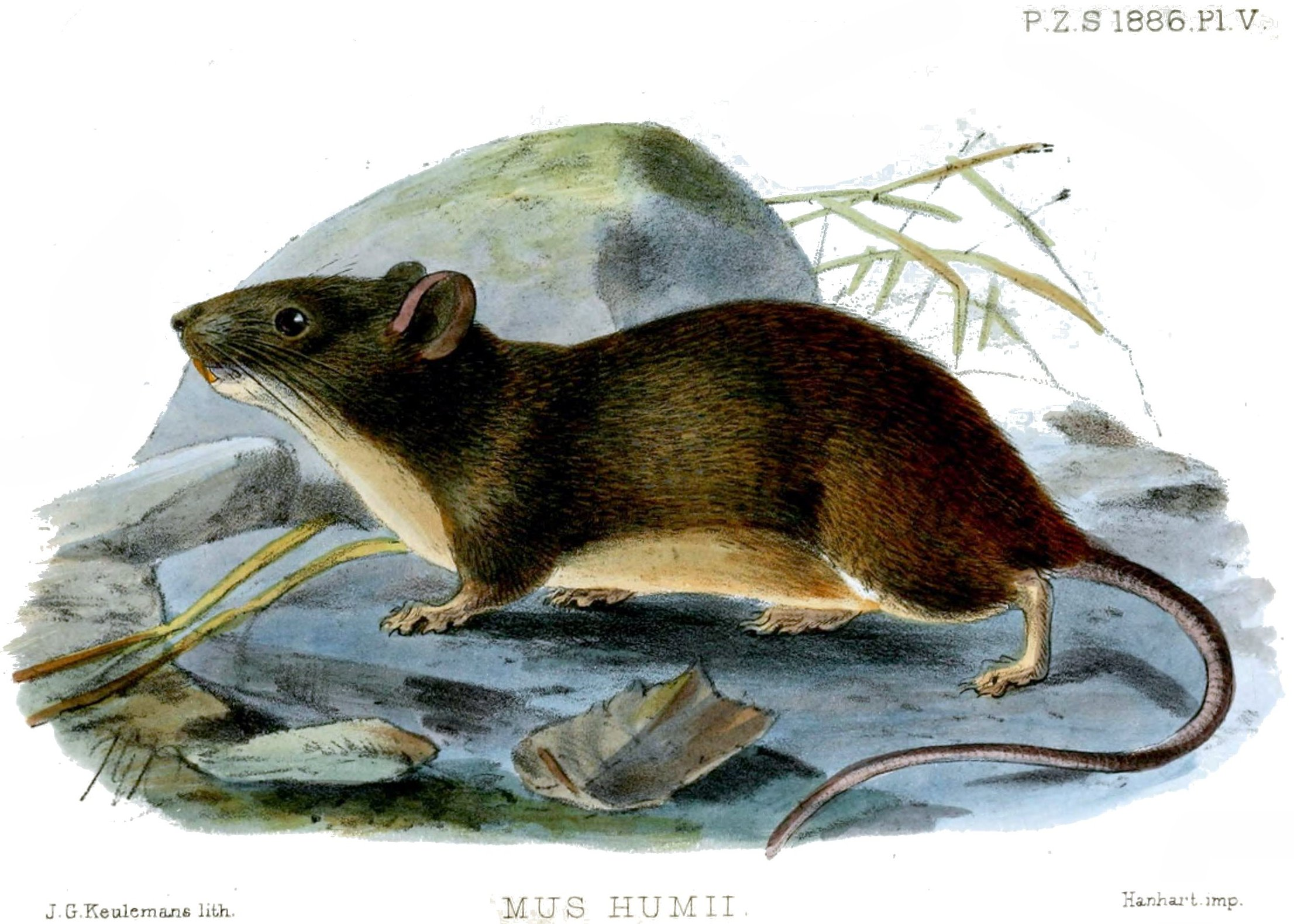

Conservation status
- Endangered (IUCN 3.1)

Scientific classification
- Kingdom: Animalia
- Phylum: Chordata
- Class: Mammalia
- Order: Rodentia
- Family: Muridae
- Genus: Hadromys
- Species: H. humei

Binomial name
- Hadromys humei (Thomas, 1886)

Synonyms
- Mus humei, Mus humii

= Manipur bush rat =

Species of rodent

The Manipur bush rat (Hadromys humei), also known as Hume's rat or Hume's hadromys, is a species of rodent in the family Muridae. It is found in northeastern India, and is listed as endangered.

== Range and habitat ==
The species is endemic to northeast India, and has been recorded from several localities. These are: Angarakhata in Kamrup district (Assam), Bishnupur, Imphal, Senapati and Karong (specimen FMNH 76562) in Manipur.

Originally thought to occur in Yunnan in China also, the Chinese animals have been reclassified as Hadromys yunnanensis Yang & Wang 1987. The fossil record shows that populations of the Manipur Bush Rat existed all over Thailand right down to the Thai-Malay border during the Pleistocene. During that time, the Indo-Malayan region may have had a cooler and drier climate with savanna-like regions. A related species is known from the Siwalik fossils from northern Pakistan. These findings indicate that Hadromys humei is probably a "relict" species.

The Manipur bush rat occurs at medium altitudes from 900 to 1,300 m (3,000 to 4,300 ft) above sea level. It inhabits tropical evergreen, moist deciduous and evergreen forests and also found in secondary forests in northeastern India.

== Discovery ==
The murid was described by Oldfield Thomas in 1886 from specimens in the Manipur collection of Allan Octavian Hume, which was donated to the British Museum (Natural History) after Hume's life's work in ornithological notes were sold by a servant as waste paper. The Manipur Bush Rat was named in his honour. The collection has two male and two female specimens, recorded to be collected on 23 March 1881 from "Moirang" (in Manipur), the type locality for this species.

== Description ==
The specimen has been described by Thomas (1886) as:

General colour above exceedingly like that of Golunda ellioti, Gr., viz. coarsely grizzled grey, lightest on the head and graduallv turning to deep rufous on the rump, the tips of the great majoritv of the hairs being white or yellowish white on the head and fore quarters, and gradually becoming rich rufous on the hind quarters, their bases in all cases deep slaty -blue. The other hairs are black throughout, and form the black element in the general grizzling. Sides like the forequarters. Belly yellow or orange, mixed with the slate of the haii -bases; no black-tipped hairs below. The inner sides of the thighs and all round the base of the tail rich rufous. The fur throughout is soft, and unmixed with flattened or spinous bristles. Feet grizzled yellowish white. Ears thinly covered outside with black hairs, and inside with black and yellow or red ones; an indistinct tuft of orange-tipped hairs iu front of the basal notch. Tail well haired, but not pencilled, markedly bicolor, the hairs black above and white below, but the scales, even of the lower side, are uniformly brown. Ears large and evenly rounded, with a small projection in the middle of their inner margins; laid forward they reacli to the posterior corner of the eye. Tail about as long as the body without the head. Fifth front toe unusually short, its claw barely reaching to the bottom of the division between the 2nd and 3rd toes, giving the foot, at first sight, the appearance of being only provided with three toes. Fifth hind toe reaching just to the base of the fourth. Foot-pads 5-6. Mammae 8, 2 pectoral and 2 inguinal pairs.

The head and body length of the largest specimen, a female, was 125 millimetres (4.9 in) long while the tail is 106 millimetres (4.2 in) long. Elsewhere, the head and body length has been given as head and body length as 95 to 140 millimetres (3.7 to 5.5 in), the tail length as 195 to 40 millimetres (7.7 to 1.6 in). The weight has been recorded as ranging from 41 to 77 grams (1.4 to 2.7 oz).

== Conservation status ==
The species has been given conservation status of "Endangered - B1ab(iii)+2ab(iii)" in IUCN Red List ver 3.1. The criteria for this assessment include:

- Limited area of occurrence (less than 500 km^{2} (190 sq mi)).
- Limited geographical extent of range (less than 5,000 km (3,100 mi)).
- Less than five areas from which it is reported.
- Continuing decline in extent and degradation of habitat.

The principal threats to this species are assessed to be loss of and degradation of habitat, fragmentation, and encroachment. Besides these, hunting and fire are also considered to be contributing causes.
