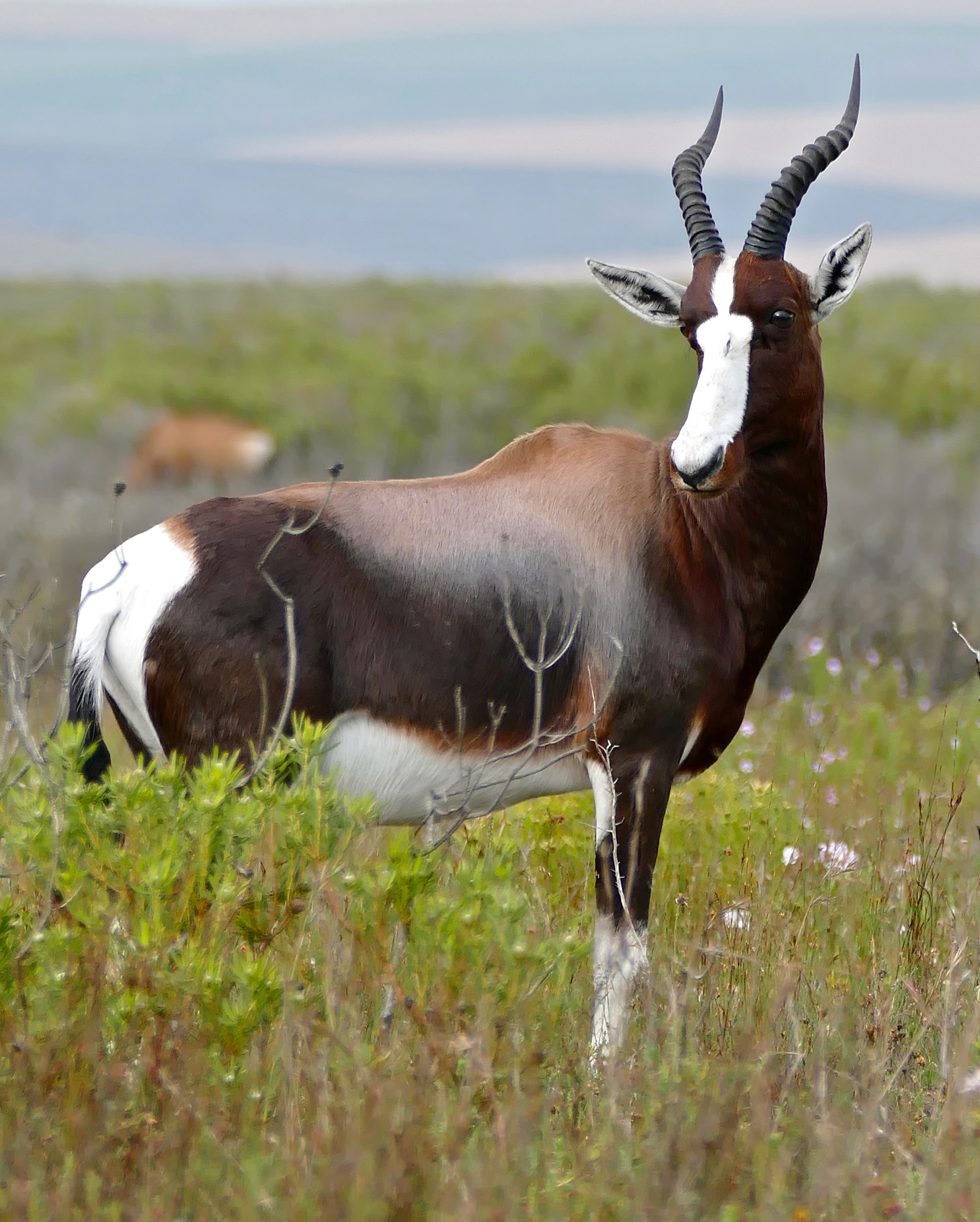
- Bontebok (Damaliscus pygargus pygargus)
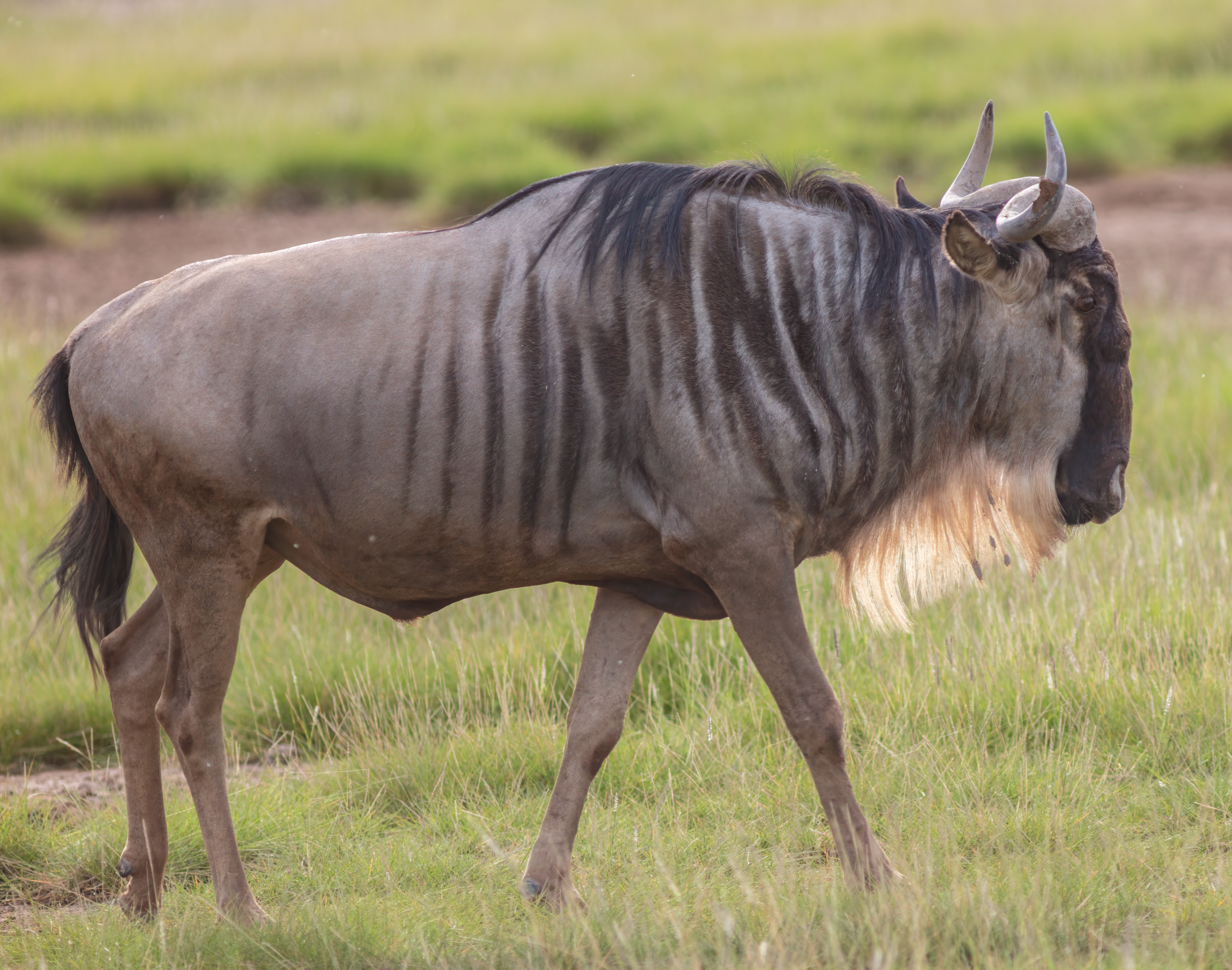
- Blue wildebeest (Connochaetes taurinus)

Scientific classification
- Kingdom: Animalia
- Phylum: Chordata
- Class: Mammalia
- Order: Artiodactyla
- Family: Bovidae
- Subfamily: Alcelaphinae; Brooke, 1876

Genera
- Alcelaphus; Beatragus; Connochaetes; Damaliscus; †Damalacra; †Damalborea; †Damalops; †Megalotragus; †Numidocapra; †Oreonagor; †Parestigorgon; †Parmularius; †Rabaticerus; †Rhynotragus; †Rusingoryx

= Alcelaphinae =

Alcelaphinae Temporal range: Late Miocene to present

Subfamily of mammals

The subfamily Alcelaphinae (or tribe Alcelaphini), of the family Bovidae, contains the wildebeest, tsessebe, topi, hartebeest, blesbok and bontebok, and several other related species. Depending on the classification, there are 6–10 species placed in four genera, although Beatragus is sometimes considered a subgenus of Damaliscus, while Sigmoceros is sometimes considered for the Lichtenstein's hartebeest.

Subfamily Alcelaphinae

- Genus Beatragus
  - Hirola, Beatragus hunteri
- Genus Damaliscus
  - Tsessebe, D. lunatus
    - Korrigum, D. lunatus korrigum
    - Topi, D. lunatus jimela
    - Coastal topi, D. lunatus topi
  - Bontebok, D. pygargus
    - Bontebok (subspecies), D. p. pygargus
    - Blesbok, D. p. phillipsi
- Genus Alcelaphus
  - Hartebeest, A. buselaphus
    - Bubal hartebeest, †A. b. buselaphus
    - Coke's hartebeest, A. b. cokii
    - Lelwel hartebeest, A. b. lelwel
    - Western hartebeest, A. b. major
    - Swayne's hartebeest, A. b. swaynei
    - Tora hartebeest, A. b. tora
    - Red hartebeest, A. b. caama
    - Lichtenstein's hartebeest, A. b. lichtensteinii
- Genus Connochaetes
  - Black wildebeest (or white-tailed gnu), C. gnou
  - Blue wildebeest, C. taurinus
    - Blue wildebeest C. t. taurinus
    - Eastern white-bearded wildebeest C. t. albojubatus
    - Cookson's wildebeest C. t. cooksoni
    - Nyassaland wildebeest C. t. johnstoni
    - Western white-bearded wildebeest C. t. mearnsi

== Extinct alcelaphines ==
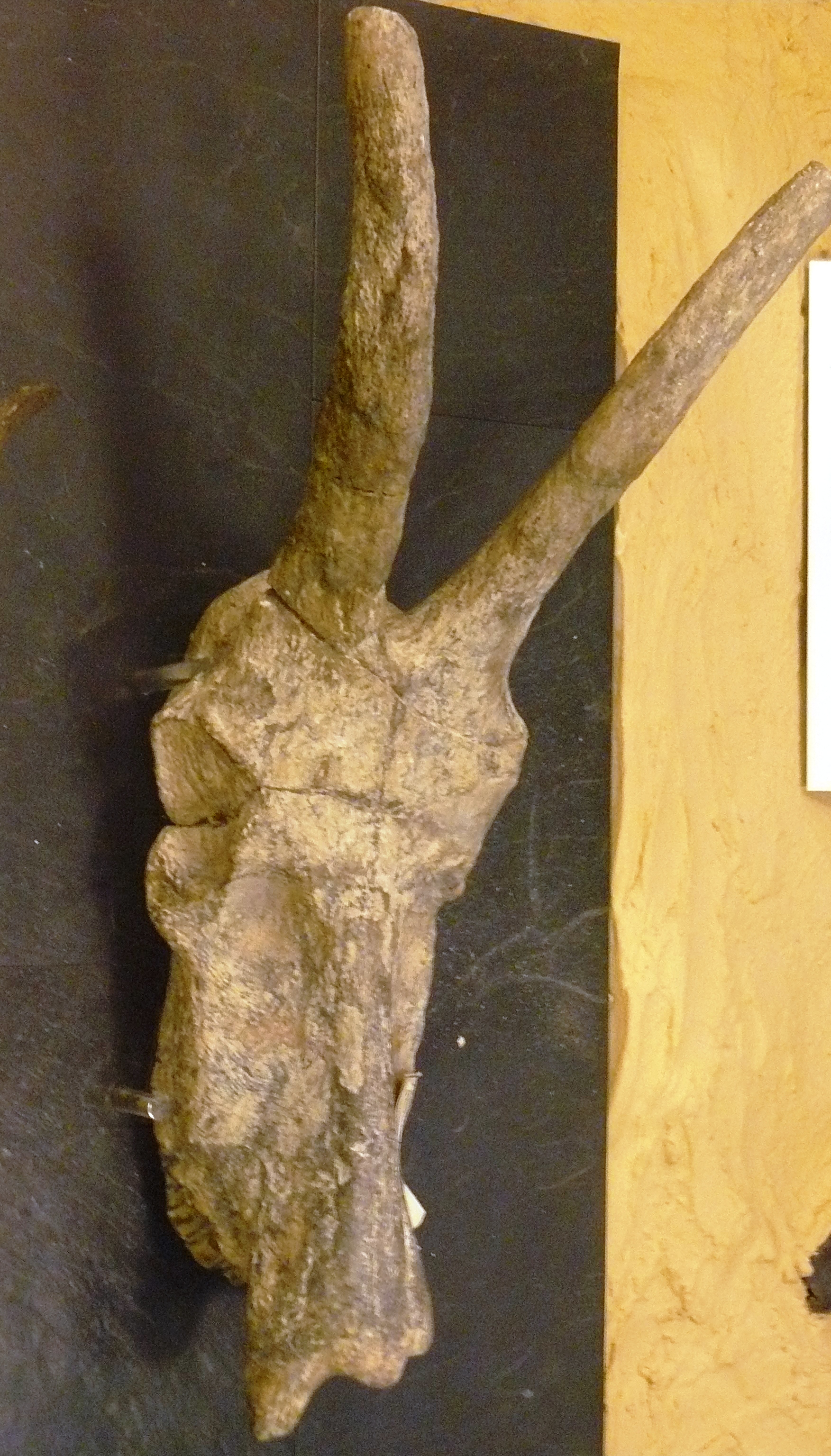
Skull of the Pleistocene alcelaphin Damalops palaeindicus from India

- Subfamily Alcelaphinae
  - Beatragus
    - †Beatragus antiquus
  - Connochaetes
    - †Connochaetes africanus
    - †Connochaetes gentryi
    - Connochaetes gnou
      - †Connochaetes gnou laticornutus
      - †Connochaetes gnou antiquus
    - Connochaetes taurinus
      - †Connochaetes taurinus olduvaiensis
  - †Damalacra
    - †Damalacra acalla
  - †Damalborea
    - †Damalborea elisabethae
  - Damaliscus
    - †Damaliscus hypsodon (Extinct: Late Pleistocene-early Holocene)
    - †Damaliscus niro
  - †Damalops
    - †Damalops palaeindicus
  - †Megalotragus
    - †Megalotragus kattwinkeli
    - †Megalotragus priscus (Extinct: Late Pleistocene-early Holocene)
  - †Numidocapra
    - †Numidocapra arambourgi
    - †Numidocapra crassicornis
    - †Numidocapra porrocornutus
  - †Oreonagor
    - †Oreonagor tournoueri
  - †Parabubalis
    - †Parabubalis capricornis
  - †Parestigorgon
  - †Parmularius
    - †Parmularius pachyceras
    - †Parmularius ambiquus
    - †Parmularius pandatus
    - †Parmularius atlanticus
    - †Parmularius rugosus
    - †Parmularius altidens
    - †Parmularius angusticornis
  - †Rabaticeras
    - †Rabaticeras lemutai
  - †Rhynotragus
    - †Rhynotragus semiticus
  - †Rusingoryx
    - †Rusingoryx atopocranion
