= Sivachoerus =

Sivachoerus Temporal range: 11.62–5.333 Ma

Scientific classification
- Kingdom: Animalia
- Phylum: Chordata
- Class: Mammalia
- Order: Artiodactyla
- Family: Suidae
- Genus: †Sivachoerus; Pilgrim, 1926

Extinct genus of mammals

Sivachoerus was an extinct genus of even-toed ungulates that existed during the Miocene in Europe.
