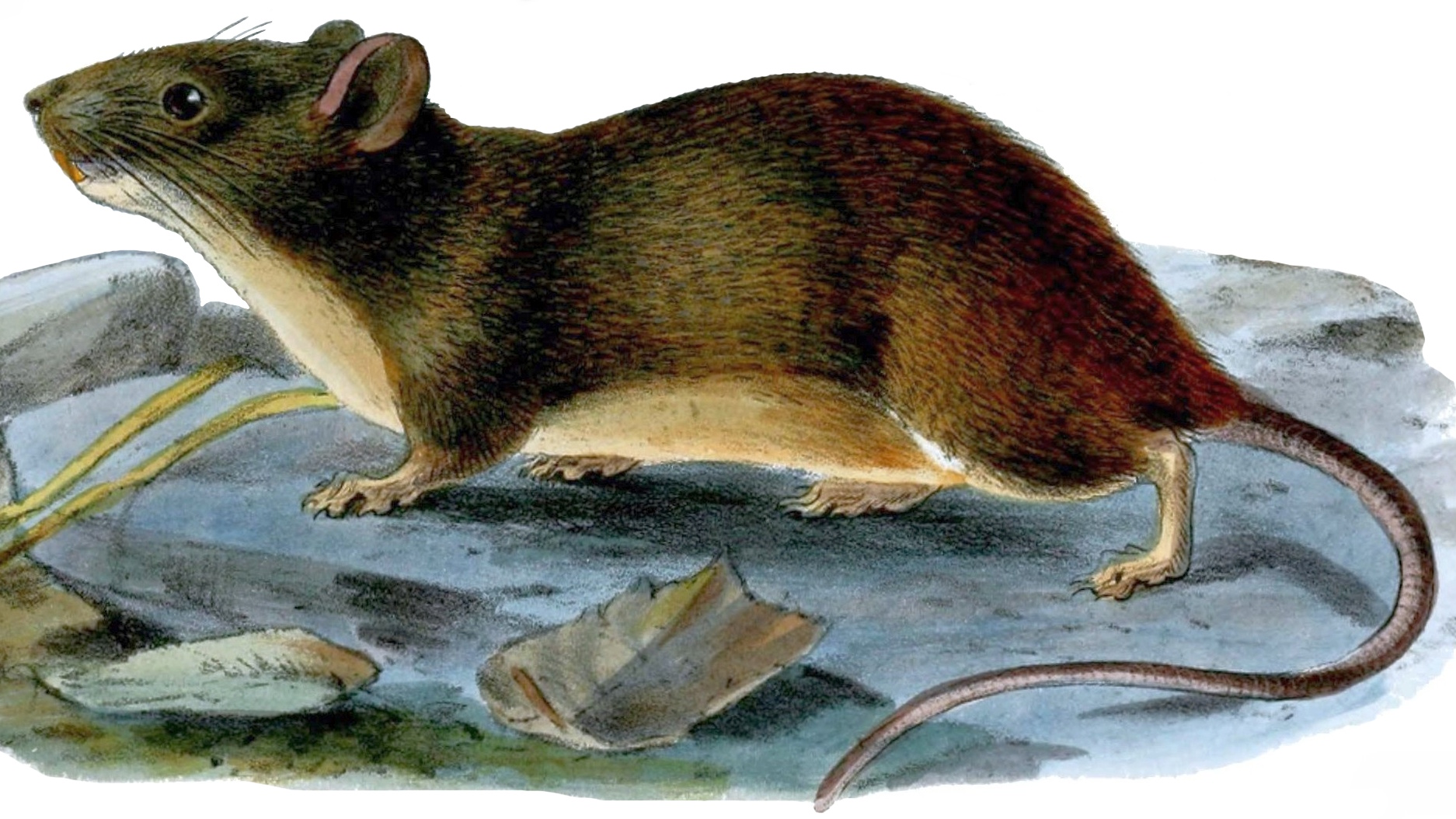
- Manipur bush rat (Hadromys humei)

Scientific classification
- Kingdom: Animalia
- Phylum: Chordata
- Class: Mammalia
- Order: Rodentia
- Family: Muridae
- Subfamily: Murinae
- Genus: Hadromys; Thomas, 1911

Type species
- Mus humei

Species
- Hadromys humei Hadromys yunnanensis †Hadromys loujacobsi

= Hadromys =

Hadromys Temporal range: Early Pleistocene to Recent

Genus of rodents

Hadromys is a genus of rodent in the family Muridae endemic to Asia. It contains the following species:

- Manipur bush rat (Hadromys humei)
- †Hadromys loujacobsi
- Yunnan bush rat (Hadromys yunnanensis)
