= Sassaby =

Sassaby may refer to:

- Topi
- Common tsessebe
