= Bangweulu =

Bangweulu may refer to

- Bangweulu Block, part of the Congo craton of central Africa
- Bangweulu (constituency), a constituency of the National Assembly of Zambia
- Bangweulu tsessebe, an antelope found in Zambia
- Bangweulu Wetlands in Zambia
- Lake Bangweulu in Zambia
