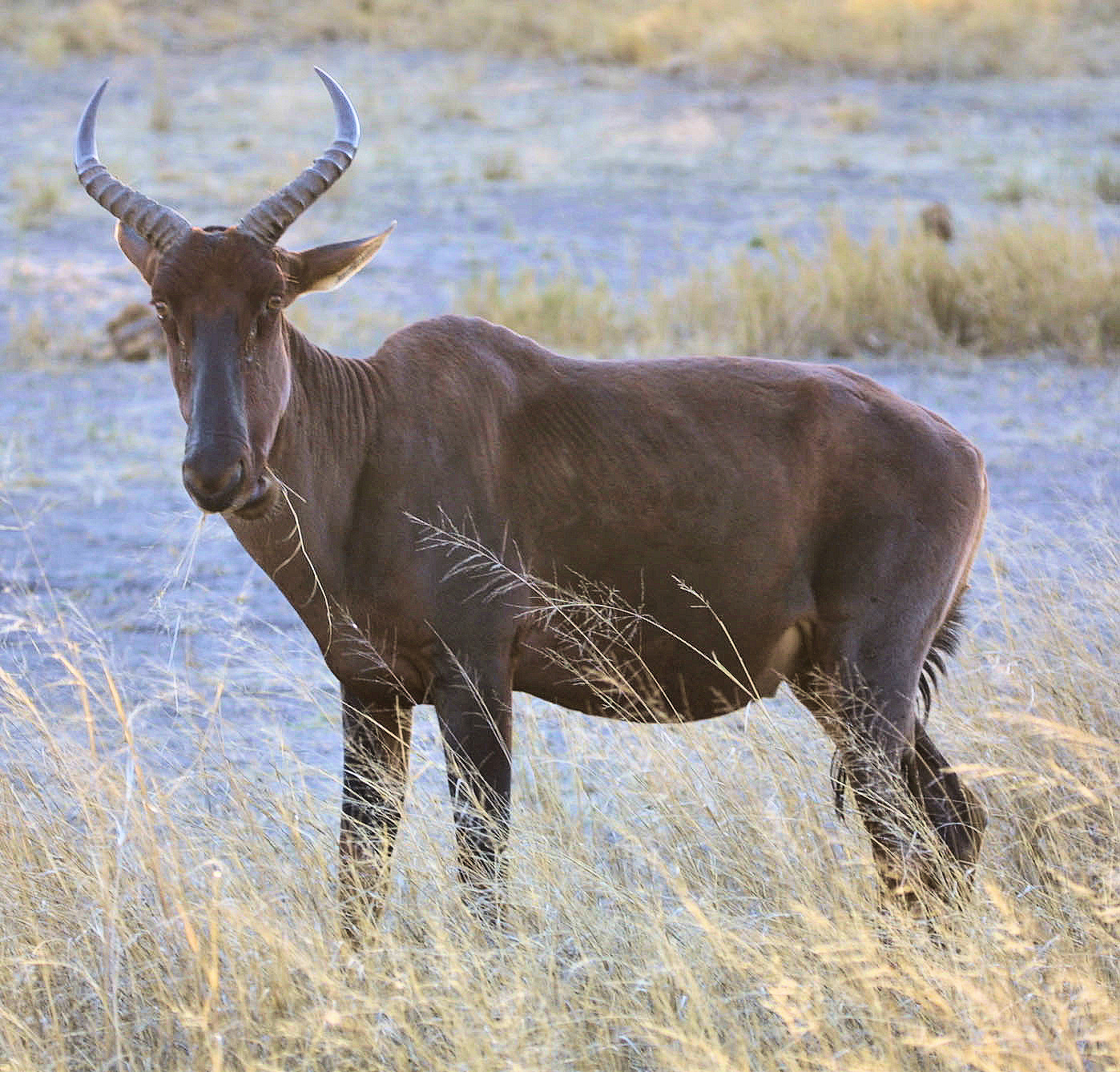
- Tsessebe in Botswana

Conservation status
- Least Concern (IUCN 3.1)

Scientific classification
- Kingdom: Animalia
- Phylum: Chordata
- Class: Mammalia
- Infraclass: Placentalia
- Order: Artiodactyla
- Family: Bovidae
- Subfamily: Alcelaphinae
- Genus: Damaliscus
- Species: D. lunatus
- Subspecies: D. l. lunatus

Trinomial name
- Damaliscus lunatus lunatus (Burchell, 1824)
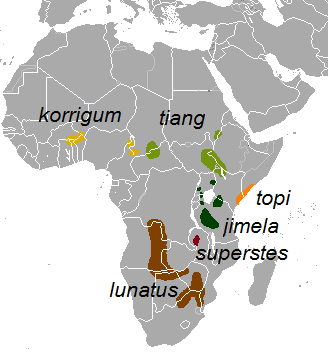
- Range in brown

= Common tsessebe =

Subspecies of the subfamily Alcelaphinae in the family Bovidae

The common tsessebe or sassaby (Damaliscus lunatus lunatus) is the southern, nominate subspecies of Damaliscus lunatus, although some authorities have recognised it as an independent species. It is most closely related to the Bangweulu tsessebe, sometimes also seen as a separate species, less to the topi, korrigum, coastal topi and tiang subspecies of D. lunatus, and less to the bontebok in the same genus. Common tsessebe are found in Angola, Zambia, Namibia, Botswana, Zimbabwe, Eswatini (formerly Swaziland), and South Africa.

Common tsessebe are among the fastest antelopes in Africa and can run at speeds up to 90 km/h (56 mph).

== Description ==
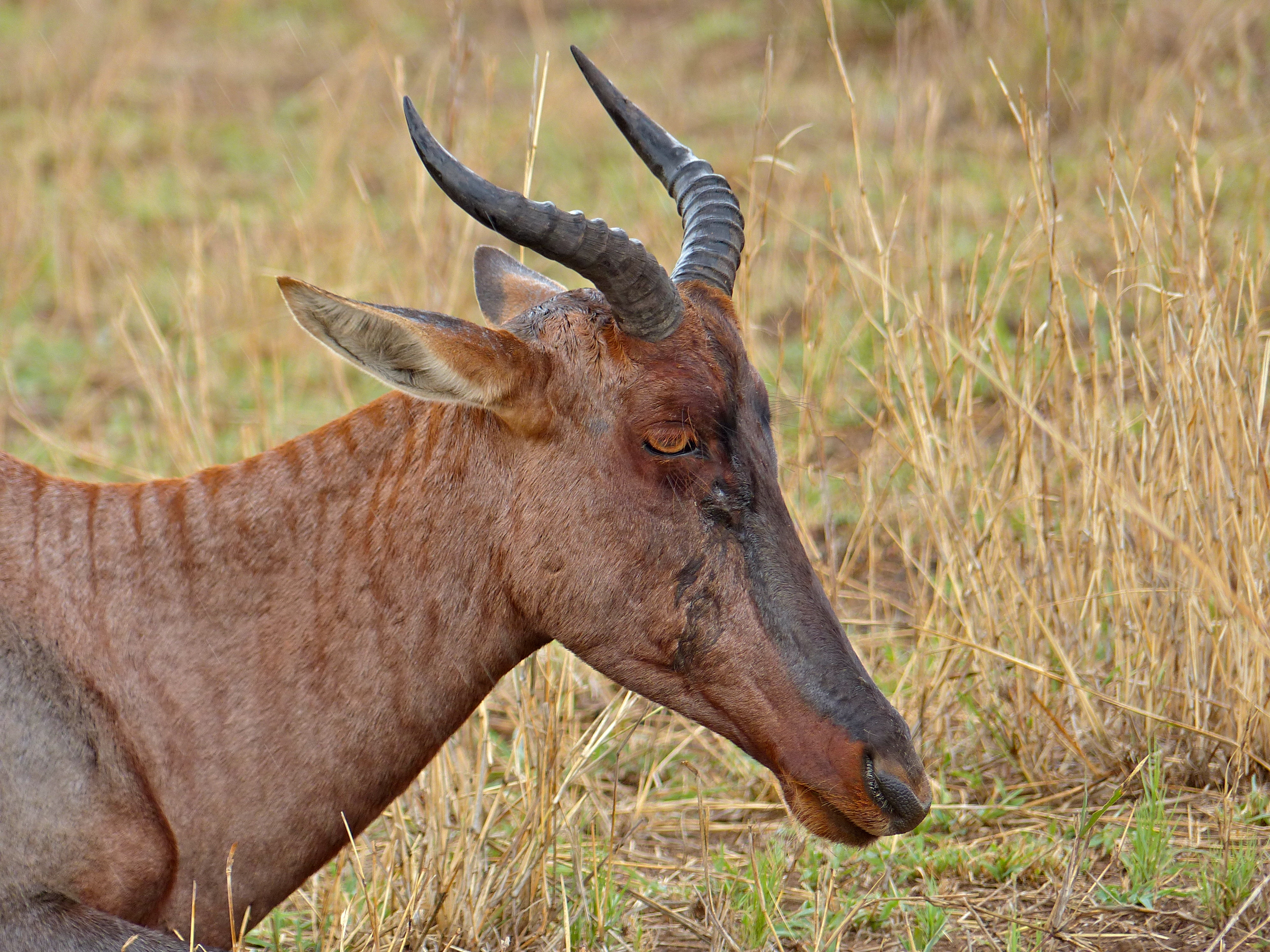
The close-up at the Kruger National Park, South Africa

Adult tsessebe typically measure 1.5 to 2.3 m (4 ft 11 in to 7 ft 7 in) in length. They are quite large animals, with males weighing 137 kg (302 lb) and females 120 kg (260 lb), on average. Their horns range from 37 cm (15 in) for females to 40 cm (16 in) for males. For males, horn size plays an important role in territory defense and mate attraction, although horn size is not positively correlated with territorial factors of mate selection. Their bodies are chestnut brown. The fronts of their faces and their tail tufts are black; the forelimbs and thighs are greyish or bluish-black. Their hindlimbs are brownish-yellow to yellow and their bellies are white. In the wild, tsessebe usually live a maximum of 15 years, but in some areas, their average lifespan is drastically decreased due to overhunting and the destruction of habitat.

The most significant difference between the tsessebe, the southernmost subspecies, and the other topi subspecies is the incline of the horns, with the tsessebe having horns which are placed further apart from each other as one moves distally. This has the effect of the space between them having a more lunate profile when seen from a certain angle, as opposed to lyrate, more like that of a hartebeest. Tsessebe populations show variation as one moves from South Africa to Botswana, with southerly populations having on average the lightest pelage colour, smallest size and the least robust horns. Common tsessebe do not differ significantly from the Bangweulu tsessebe, the northernmost population, but in general the populations from that part of Zambia are on average the darkest-coloured and have the most robust horns, although differences are slight and individuals in both populations show variation in these characteristics which almost completely overlap each other.

== Behavior ==
Tsessebe are social animals. Females form herds composed of six to 10, with their young. After males turn one year of age, they are ejected from the herd and form bachelor herds that can be as large as 30 young bulls. Territorial adult bulls form herds the same size as young bulls, although the formation of adult bull herds is mainly seen in the formation of a lek. Tsessebe declare their territory through a variety of behaviors. Territorial behavior includes moving in an erect posture, high-stepping, defecating in a crouch stance, ground-horning, mud packing, shoulder-wiping, and grunting.

The most important aggressive display of territorial dominance is in the horning of the ground. Another far more curious form of territory marking is through the anointing of their foreheads and horns with secretions from glands near their eyes. Tsessebe accomplish this by inserting grass stems into their preorbital glands to coat them with secretion, then waving it around, letting the secretions fall onto their heads and horns. This process is not as commonly seen as ground-horning, nor is its purpose as well known.

Several of their behaviors strike scientists as peculiar. One such behavior is the habit of sleeping tsessebe to rest their mouths on the ground with their horns sticking straight up into the air. Male tsessebe has also been observed standing in parallel ranks with their eyes closed, bobbing their heads back and forth. These habits are peculiar because scientists have yet to find a proper explanation for their purposes or functions.

== Diet and habitat ==
Tsessebe are primarily grazing herbivores in grasslands, open plains, and lightly wooded savannas, but they are also found in rolling uplands and very rarely in flat plains below 1,500 m (4,900 ft) above sea level. Tsessebe found in the Serengeti usually feed in the morning between 8:00 and 9:00 am and in the afternoon after 4:00 pm. The periods before and after feeding are spent resting and digesting or watering during dry seasons. Tsessebe can travel up to 5 km (3.1 mi) to reach a viable water source. To avoid encounters with territorial males or females, tsessebe usually travel along territorial borders, though it leaves them open to attacks by lions and leopards.

== Breeding and reproduction ==
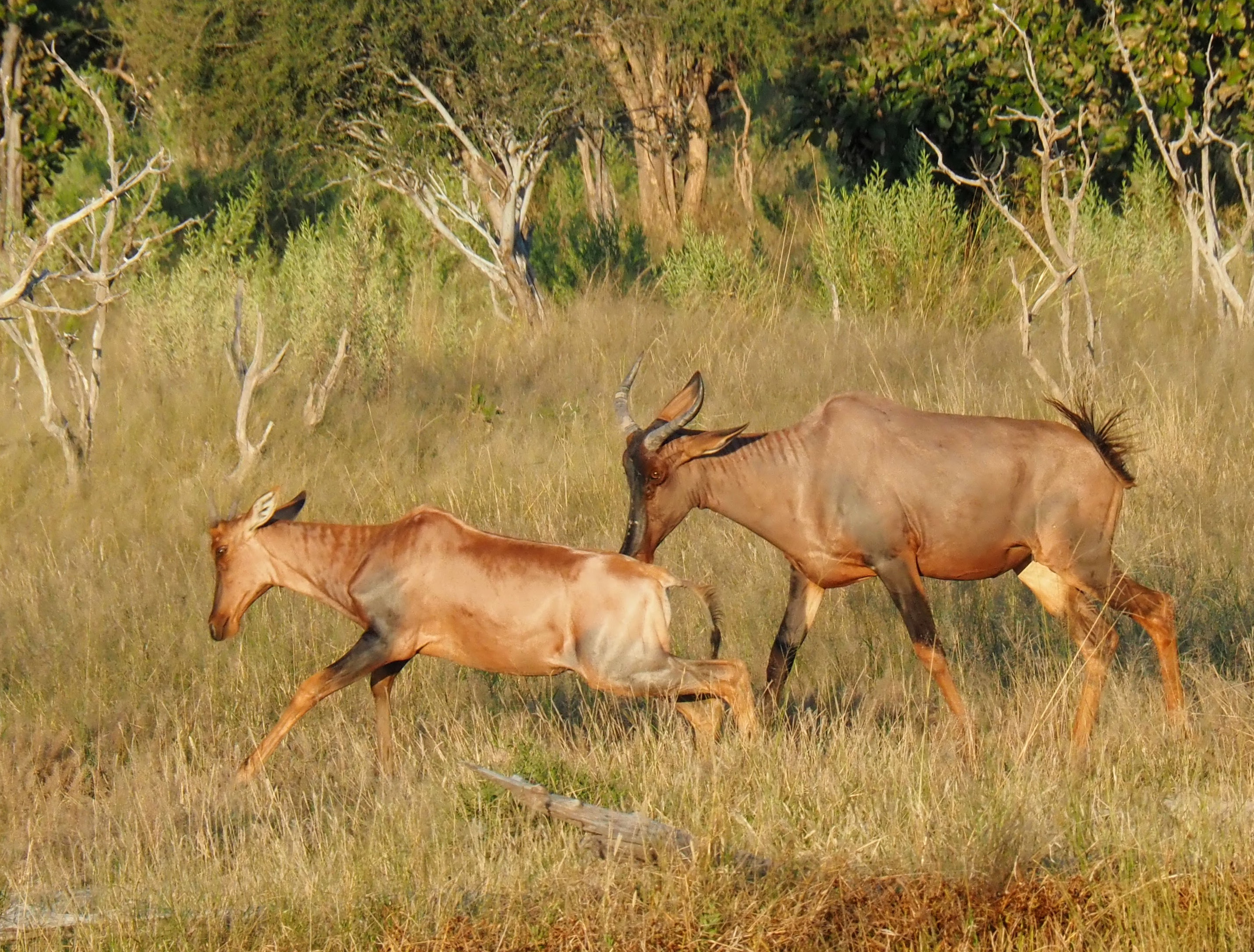
Common tsessebes in Botswana

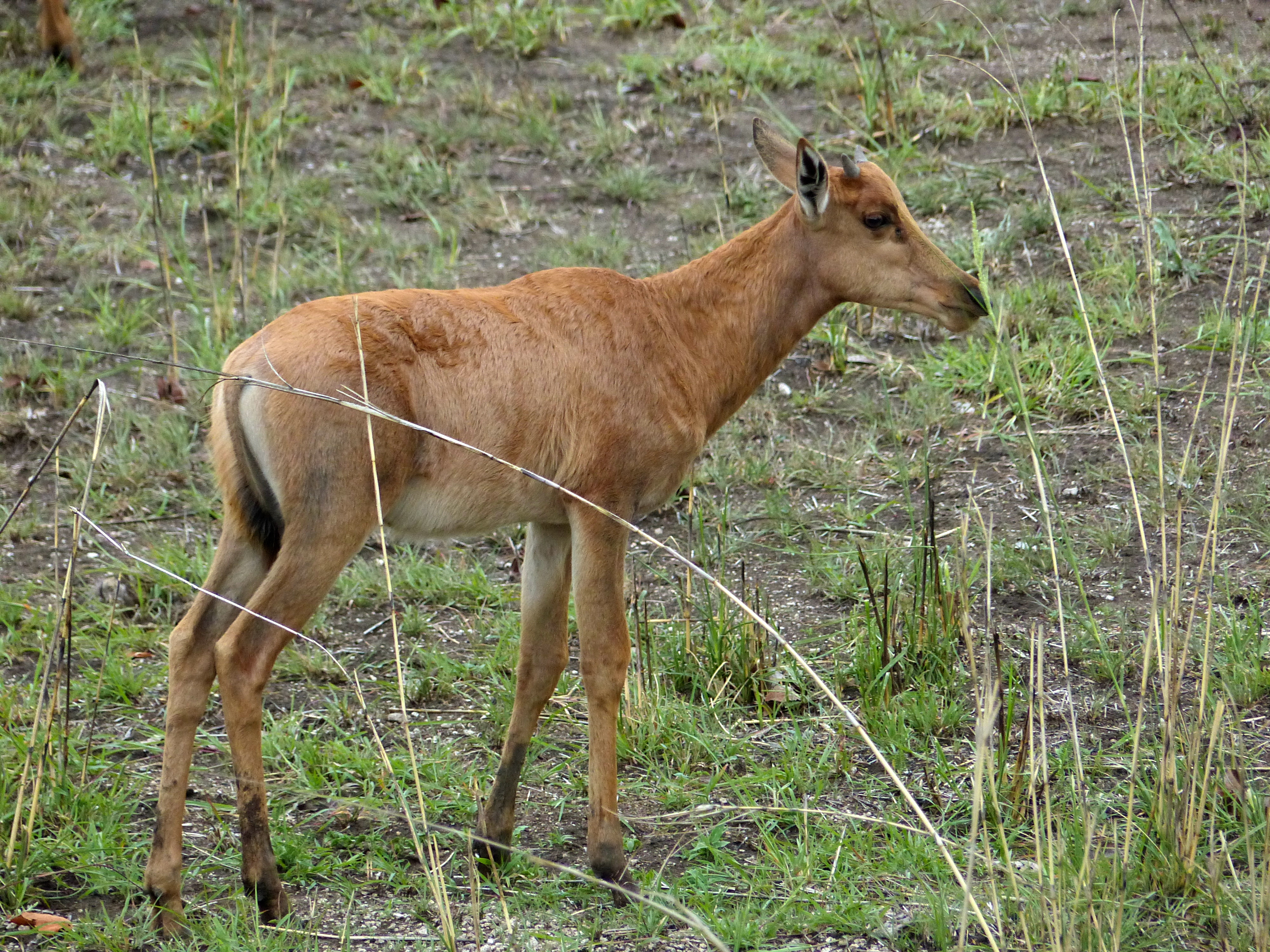
A young at the Kruger National Park, South Africa

Tsessebe reproduce at a rate of one calf per year per mating couple. Calves reach sexual maturity in two to three and half years. After mating, the gestation period of a tsessebe cow lasts seven months. The rut, or period when males start competing for females, starts in mid-February and stretches through March. The female estrous cycle is shorter, but happens in this time.

The breeding process starts with the development of a lek. Leks are established by the congregation of adult males in an area that females visit only for mating. Lekking is of particular interest since the female choice of a mate in the lek area is independent of any direct male influence. Several options are available to explain how females choose a mate, but the most interesting is in the way the male's group in the middle of a lek.

The grouping of males can appeal to females for several reasons. First, groups of males can protect from predators. Secondly, if males group in an area with a low food supply, it prevents competition between males and females for resources. Finally, the grouping of males provides females with a wider variety of mates to choose from, as they are all located in one central area. Dominant males occupy the center of the leks, so females are more likely to mate at the center than at the periphery of the lek.

A study by Bro-Jorgensen (2003) allowed a closer look into lek dynamics. The closer a male is to the center of the lek, the greater his mating success rate. For a male to reach the center of the lek, he must be strong enough to outcompete other males. Once a male's territory is established in the middle of the lek, it is maintained for quite a while; even if an area opens up at the center, males rarely move to fill it unless they can outcompete the large males already present. However, maintaining central lek territory has many physical drawbacks. For example, males are often wounded in the process of defending their territory from hyenas and other males.

== Etymology ==
The first known Westerner to record this antelope was the English painter Samuel Daniell, who painted it in "Boosh-wana", and recorded it as the "sassayby". The painting of the animal was first published posthumously in 1820 by his brother. William Cornwallis Harris, in his 1840 book about big game hunting, was quite familiar with the species in the Cashan Mountains and Kurrichane Hills, and renders the name as "sassaybe". Sassaby had thus become the common name for this antelope among European settlers living in Southern Africa by the end of the 19th century. The English later recorded the Setswana name for the antelope as tsessĕbe, by 1895 it was thought that this was the origin for the anglicised word. The proper Setswana name for the animal is Tshêsêbê. Other names for the antelope which were recorded by Frederick Selous around this time were inkweko in the language of the Basubia of the Caprivi Strip (related to Lozi), incolomo and incomazan in the isiNdebele of "Matebele", unchuru was the Sekuba name given by the Makuba of northern Botswana, inyundo by the Makalaka, and luchu or lechu by the Basarwa. The antelope was recorded as called myanzi in isiZulu and the bastaard hartebeest by the Afrikaners, indeed it looks somewhat like a cross between a hartebeest and a horse. The new vernacular name 'common tsessebe' was invented by Peter Grubb in 2005 to refer to Damaliscus lunatus lunatus to distinguish it from the new Bangweulu taxon.

== Conservation status ==
In 1998, the IUCN estimated a total tsessebe population of 30,000, including the Bangweulu animals. It was assessed as 'lower risk (conservation dependent)'. In the 2016 update to the Red List of Mammals of South Africa, Swaziland and Lesotho, the minimum South African population was estimated as 2,256–2,803 individuals, of which the total minimum mature population size was 1,353–1,962; this was believed to be a significant underestimate, due to not getting enough responses from private game reserves on time for publication.

During the 1980s and 1990s, tsessebe populations in South Africa and Zimbabwe declined significantly, especially in the National Parks. In 1999 the populations stabilised and began to grow again, especially in private game reserves. There were a number of different theories advanced as to what was causing this decline, while other species were doing well. One 2006 theory for this decline was that woody plant encroachment was playing a primary role. As of 2016, interspecific competition is believed to have played a primary role, with the decline in tsessebe being caused by the proliferation of other antelope species, which was itself due to the opening of man-made watering holes in the game parks. Closing watering holes is believed to increase habitat heterogeneity in the parks, which would favour the tsessebe.

Initially an uncommon animal, in the 2000s the population on private game reserves in both South Africa and Zimbabwe, primarily stocked for the trophy hunting industry, began to grow quickly, with large jumps seen in the 2010s. As a large percentage of these animals are found in wild conditions in their natural areas of distribution, this is seen as contributing to the recovery of the species in South Africa. Nonetheless, there are some questions as to the potential danger of it hybridising with the also native red hartebeest which are common throughout its range, and with which hybrids have been recorded in both ranches and in National Parks. Such hybrids are likely fully fertile, and some fear such miscegenation could potentially pollute the gene pool in the future.

In northern Botswana, on the other hand, populations declined from 1996 to 2013, tsessebe populations in the Okavango Delta declined by 73%, with a 87% decline in the Moremi Game Reserve in particular. A study compared the situation with around Lake Rukwa in Tanzania in the 1950s, a paper about game populations and the elephant problem, which might create the open habitat required through their bulldozing behaviour.

== Uses ==
Excess tsessebe can be bought from South African National Parks via game auctions under Section 55(2) (b) of the Protected Areas Act 57 of 2003.

In Zambia, Zimbabwe, Botswana, Namibia and South Africa, tsessebe may be legally trophy hunted in game management concessions, game ranches, or both.

Tsessebe hides were formerly (1840) locally much in demand in South Africa to make a garment called a kobo, a type of leather mantle, both for the suppleness and the pleasing colour. The tail would be positioned at the back of the neck, like a ponytail, and would be opened and squeezed flat.
