= Damaliscus niro =

Damaliscus niro Temporal range: Pleistocene

Scientific classification
- Domain: Eukaryota
- Kingdom: Animalia
- Phylum: Chordata
- Class: Mammalia
- Order: Artiodactyla
- Family: Bovidae
- Subfamily: Alcelaphinae
- Genus: Damaliscus
- Species: †D. niro

Binomial name
- †Damaliscus niro Hopwood, 1936

Synonyms
- Hippotragus niro

Extinct species of antelope

Damaliscus niro is an extinct species of antelope that lived in Africa throughout the Pleistocene, as recently as 63,000 years ago.

== Taxonomy ==
Arthur Tindell Hopwood described Damaliscus niro as Hippotragus niro in 1936 from a horn core collected by L.S.B. Leakey from a site at the Olduvai Gorge. In 1965, Gentry transferred the species from Hippotragus to Damaliscus.

== Distribution and age ==
Damaliscus niro is mostly known from the Early to Middle Pleistocene of eastern and southern Africa. In 2008, some Late Pleistocene remains of D. niro were found near Plovers Lake in South Africa, dated to between 89,000 and 63,000 BP.

== Description ==
Damaliscus niro has backwards curving horn cores with well-spaced, strong transverse ridges on their front surface. Isotopic evidence from Mid Pleistocene specimens suggest a diet dominated by C4 grasses.
