= Damaliscus hypsodon =

Damaliscus hypsodon Temporal range: Mid - Late Pleistocene

Scientific classification
- Kingdom: Animalia
- Phylum: Chordata
- Class: Mammalia
- Order: Artiodactyla
- Family: Bovidae
- Subfamily: Alcelaphinae
- Genus: Damaliscus
- Species: †D. hypsodon

Binomial name
- †Damaliscus hypsodon Faith et al., 2012

Extinct species of antelope

Damaliscus hypsodon is an extinct species of antelope from the Middle-Late Pleistocene of Africa. Fossils have been found in Kenya and Tanzania.

== Taxonomy ==
It was first described in 2012, though its remains were initially discovered in 1990 and went unnamed. The earliest remains are from around 392 to 330 ka, while the latest are from as recently as 12,000 years ago.

== Description ==
Damaliscus hypsodon was a small alcelaphine, only around the size of an impala. The teeth of D. hypsodon showed a degree of hypsodonty greater than living antelopes and comparable to horses, indicating that it was a specialized grazer. Its remains have been found in association with oryx and zebras, which along with its tooth morphology suggest that it lived in open and arid grasslands.
