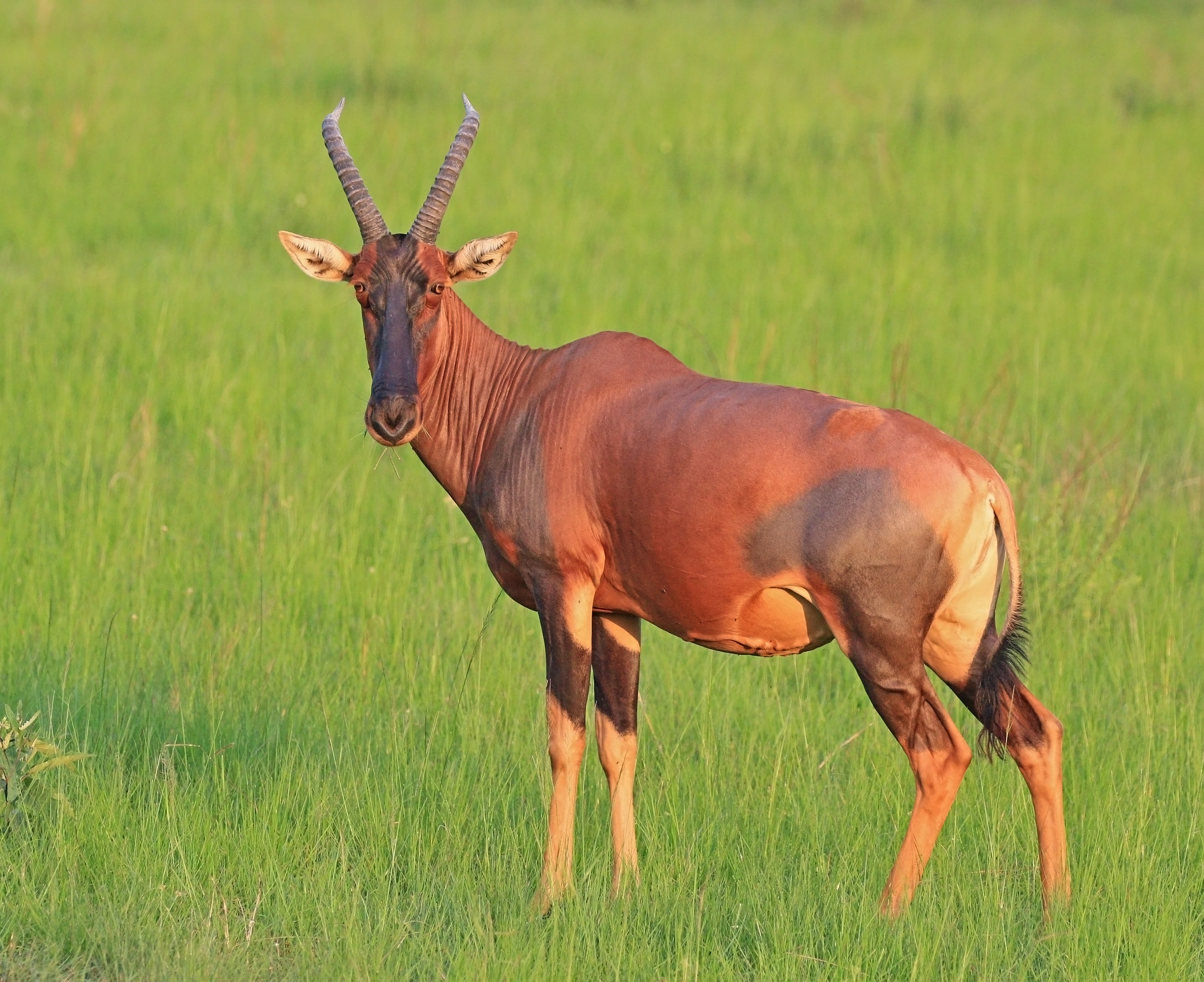
- A female topi (Damaliscus lunatus jimela)

Scientific classification
- Kingdom: Animalia
- Phylum: Chordata
- Class: Mammalia
- Order: Artiodactyla
- Family: Bovidae
- Subfamily: Alcelaphinae
- Genus: Damaliscus; P.L. Sclater & Thomas, 1894

Type species
- Antilope pygargus Pallas, 1767

Species
- Damaliscus lunatus; Damaliscus pygargus – bontebok; †Damaliscus hypsodon; †Damaliscus niro
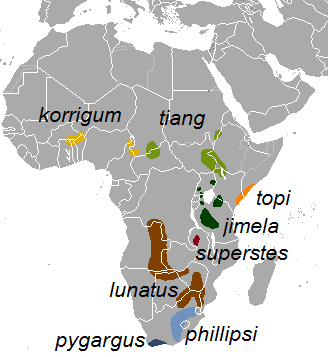
- Subspecies range map of the genus Damaliscus

= Damaliscus =

Genus of mammals

The genus Damaliscus, commonly known as damalisks, is a genus of antelope in the family Bovidae, subfamily Alcelaphinae, found in Africa.

== Species ==
Listed alphabetically.

Genus Damaliscus – P.L. Sclater & Thomas, 1894 – four species
Common name	Scientific name and subspecies	Range	Size and ecology	IUCN status and estimated population
topi, tiang or tsessebe	Damaliscus lunatus Burchell, 1824 Six subspecies: D. l. jimela Matschie, 1892 – topi; D. l. korrigum Ogilby, 1836 – korrigum; D. l. lunatus – common tsessebe; D. superstes (Cotterill, 2003) - Bangweulu tsessebe; D. l. tiang (Heuglin, 1863) – tiang; D. l. topi Blaine, 1914 – coastal topi	Angola, Zambia, Namibia, Botswana, Zimbabwe, Eswatini, and South Africa	Size: Habitat: Diet:	LC
bontebok	Damaliscus pygargus (Pallas, 1767) Two subspecies: D. p. phillipsi Harper, 1939 – blesbok; D. p. pygargus (Pallas, 1767) – bontebok	South Africa, Lesotho and Namibia	Size: Habitat: Diet:	VU
	† Damaliscus hypsodon (Faith et al., 2012)	Known from the Middle-Late Pleistocene of East Africa; became extinct at the onset of the Holocene due to the loss of its grassland habitat	Size: Habitat: Diet:	EX
	† Damaliscus niro Hopwood, 1936	Known from throughout the Pleistocene of eastern and southern Africa; became extinct around 63,000 years ago.	Size: Habitat: Diet:	EX
