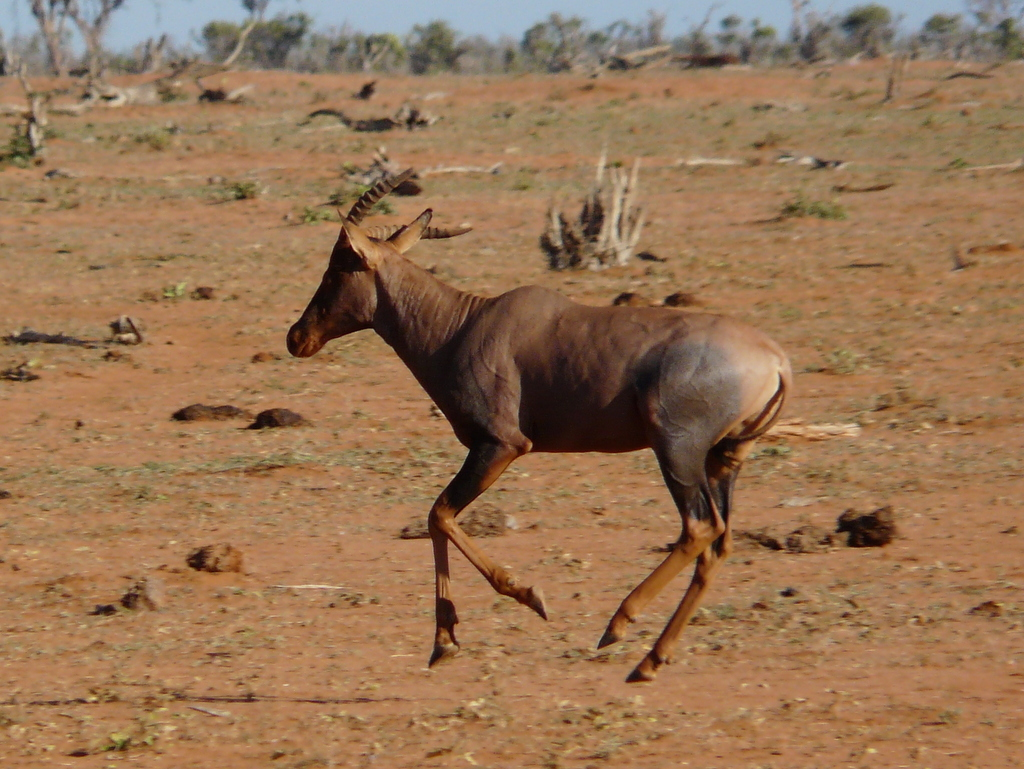

Conservation status
- Endangered (IUCN 3.1)

Scientific classification
- Kingdom: Animalia
- Phylum: Chordata
- Class: Mammalia
- Infraclass: Placentalia
- Order: Artiodactyla
- Family: Bovidae
- Subfamily: Alcelaphinae
- Genus: Damaliscus
- Species: D. lunatus
- Subspecies: D. l. topi

Trinomial name
- Damaliscus lunatus topi (Blaine, 1914)

= Coastal topi =

Species of antelope

The coastal topi (Damaliscus lunatus topi) is a highly social antelope of the genus Damaliscus. It is a subspecies of the topi.

== Range and distribution ==
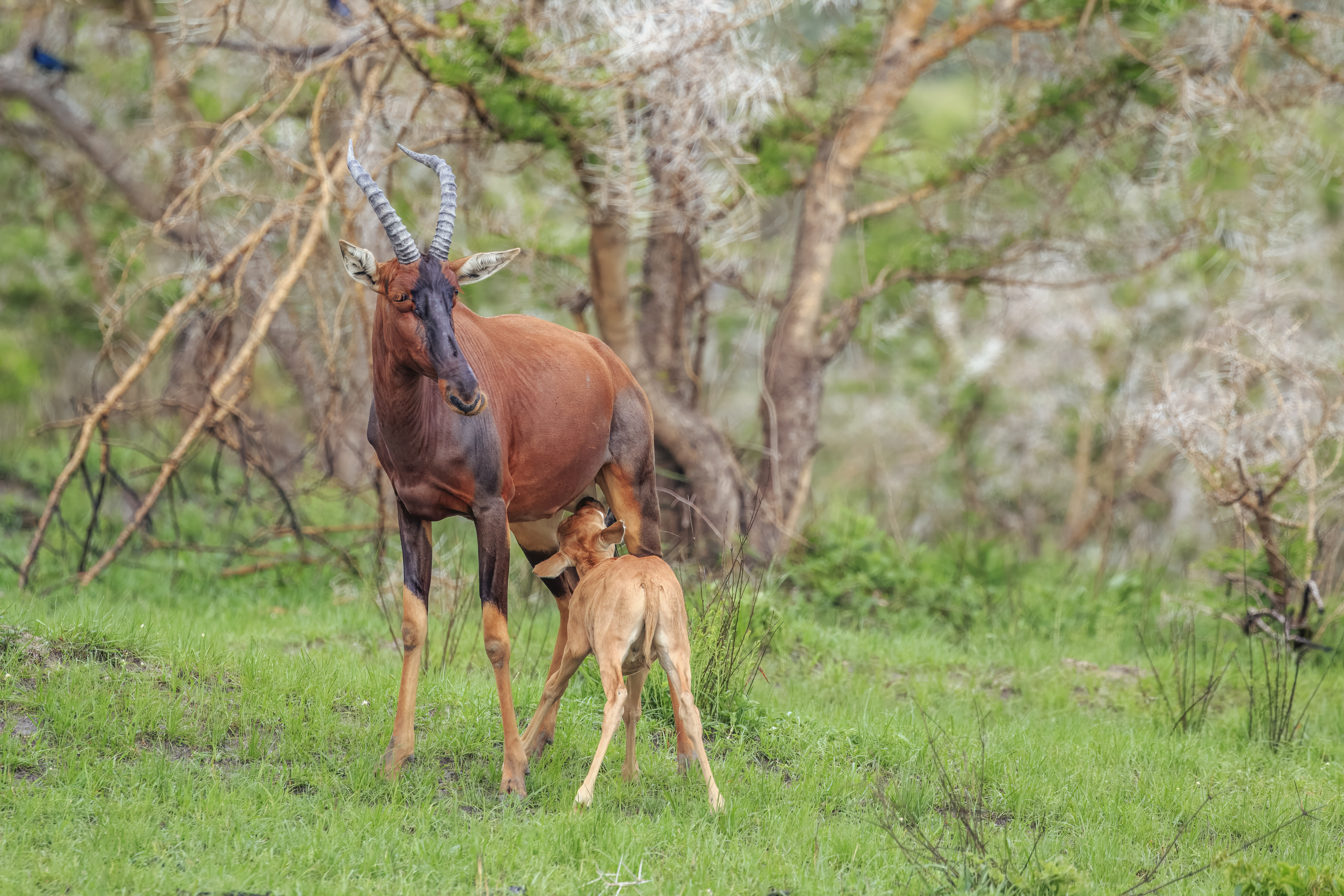
Female with calf suckling

Coastal topi occur in Kenya in the Lamu, Garissa and Tana River districts. They were formerly found in southern Somalia in riverine grasslands on the lower Shebelle and Juba Rivers and around Lake Badana; no current information is available on these populations. In 1999, the total population was assessed at ~100,000 individuals.
