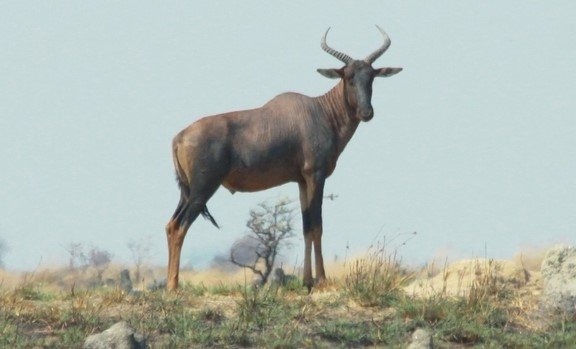

Conservation status
- Least Concern (IUCN 3.1)(see text)

Scientific classification
- Kingdom: Animalia
- Phylum: Chordata
- Class: Mammalia
- Order: Artiodactyla
- Family: Bovidae
- Subfamily: Alcelaphinae
- Genus: Damaliscus
- Species: D. lunatus
- Subspecies: D. l. superstes

Trinomial name
- Damaliscus lunatus superstes (Cotterill, 2003)
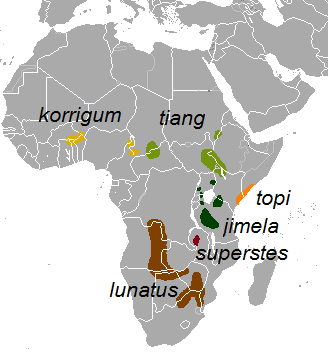
- Range in red

= Bangweulu tsessebe =

Population or subspecies of mammal

The Bangweulu tsessebe (Damaliscus lunatus superstes) is a population and possible taxon of Damaliscus lunatus (topi or sassaby), which are large African antelopes of the grasslands. This population is presently restricted to northern Zambia in the wild, although it was recorded as occurring in neighbouring southernmost Democratic Republic of the Congo in the 1940s. Also seen as the northernmost population belonging to the nominate southern sassaby subspecies, in 2003 it was described as a new species, only to be downgraded to a subspecies a few years later. Its taxonomic status is unclear as of 2021. As an individual sassaby of this taxon cannot be clearly distinguished from populations to the south, the taxon was defined using an experimental suite of statistical techniques applied to a sample set, based on multivariate analysis, and recognised under an experimental new taxonomy. Nominate sassaby antelopes become progressively darker on average in the northern populations, and on average have slightly thicker horns at the base of the skull, but those of northern Zambia are the darkest and with the most robust horns on average (a mean 4.3% thicker than the Botswana average, compared to 1.2% mean size difference between Botswana and Zimbabwe).

== Taxonomy and description ==
In 2003 the naturalist Fenton Cotterill argued that the sassaby in the southern Bangweulu Flats in northeastern Zambia should be classified as a new species. He had examined 23 skulls from this region, and determined that compared to the sassaby population further south, on average the cross-section of the horns was a bit thicker in this sample. In the paper Cotterill rejected the biological species concept, rejected the concept of subspecies entirely, and hence rejected the then current taxonomy of topis (by Ansell, 1972), arguing that three geographic sassaby populations should be regarded as different species. Instead of using conventional techniques to distinguish taxonomic groups, Cotterill invented and applied something he called the 'Consilient Solution' to determine that there were differences from the other sassaby populations to the south. The Consilient Solution was based on phenetic and a set of multivariate analysis statistical techniques, which, rather than enable people to identify individuals as belonging to specific taxa, allows taxa to be defined and identified by the spread in variables across a sample set.

An individual antelope cannot objectively be differentiated as one or the other taxa, because the relevant cranial characteristics exist as overlapping spectra; however, Cotterill used statistical techniques to determine that the differences of two characteristics were significant enough in his sample sets to use to differentiate them, although both of these characteristics of different populations appear to average differently in a cline going from south to north, and in many ways the Zimbabwe sample set differed as much from the Botswana sample set, as the Zambia group differed from the Botswana group.

The most significant difference between Damaliscus superstes and sassaby populations in Southern Africa was seen most clearly in the following two morphologic characteristics: the width of the base of the horn, and the thickness of the horn core. Based on 23 skulls and those of other mentioned above, on average, the horns of sassaby populations become slightly more robust and longer as one moves north to Zambia, with sassaby from Bangweulu having the largest bases of the horns (pedicles), and thus slightly wider skulls. The pedicle widths of twelve males averaged at 130.9mm, with a spread of 122–136.5mm, compared to 125.3mm in Botswana, with a spread of 117.9-136.0mm, and 123mm in Zimbabwe, with a spread of 112.2-134.2mm. The horn core of the males was 51.6mm thick on average, with a spread of 45.1-64.6mm, compared to 47.1mm in Botswana, with a spread of 38.6-53.5mm, and 44.9mm in Zimbabwe, with a spread of 38.7-58.7mm.

Similarly, based on eleven skins from this taxon and other sassaby skins from further south, and field observations, the pelage was observed to average darker from south to north, with that of the Bangweulu animals being described as chocolate-brown. There is also probably a cline in the average body size of the animals, with those of Bangweulu being the largest. Other less definite characteristics are a higher braincase on average, a wider zygoma on average, and a longer rostrum due to on average longer maxillary teeth rows. The horns had a slightly wider spread and were longer on average. In adults of both sexes, the horns grow symmetrically to form a sphere, as opposed to the more semi-lunate profile of lunatus. The larger size, spherical horn profile and darker pelage could be used in the field according to Cotterill. Another possible difference is in the protozoa found in the digestive tract, based on two studies, both taxa contain the same eleven species in their gut flora as found in all topi, but Epidinium lunatus had up till then only been identified in a study of sassaby in South Africa and Ostracodinium damaliscus had recently been described from the rumen of sassaby from Zambia, thus there is potentially a possibility that these protozoa might be restricted to these particular populations and thus be diagnostic.

=== Systematics ===
Because individual sassaby cannot be identified as this taxon or the other, Cotterill posits it might be a cryptic species. Although the taxon would not be recognised under the conventional biological species concept, and while he suggested his new species might be valid under the phylogenetic species concept, he admitted that the only possible synapomorphies differentiating his species was the horn base width, and possibly also the darker coat colour, Cotterill thus advocated recognising his species under something he called the 'Recognition Species Concept', which he had recently invented.

In the 2005 Mammal Species of the World, Peter Grubb accepted Cotterill's interpretation in full, splitting the sassaby into three species: a southern, northern and the Bangweulu. Macdonald considered the Bangweulu a subspecies in 2006, the IUCN SSC Antelope Specialist Group also subsumed it as a subspecies in 2008. In the 2011 book Ungulate Taxonomy, Colin Groves and Grubb went even further and split the sassaby into nine species, also including this taxon at the rank of species. They used the phylogenetic species concept to split this species and many others based on small qualitative physical differences between different geographic populations, based on small sample sets, and without publishing any research supporting their positions. This proved controversial among mammalogists. ASM Mammal Diversity Database thus decided to reject the Groves and Grubb taxonomic interpretation of the sassaby in its entirety, and in this case also reject the 2005 Mammal Species of the World, essentially reverting to the 1972 Ansell view with the addition of superstes as a synonym of D. lunatus.

== Etymology ==
The English recorded the Tswana name for these antelopes as the word tsessĕbe or sassaybe. This was then anglicised to the vernacular name 'sassaby' by the end of the 19th century in English. Cotterill proposed the common name 'Bangweulu tsessebe' for the northern Zambian population in 2003. The specific epithet superstes, meaning 'surviving', 'being present' and also 'witnessing', was chosen because Cotterill was convinced this population had been isolated in northern Zambia since at least the Pleistocene, based on the theoretical hydrological changes in this region of Africa in that era, specifically, the capture of the Chambeshi river, which Cotterill hypothesises may have emptied into a giant floodplain of its own in the Pleistocene, and based on the supposition that the habitat requirements of the antelope are linked to the existence of wetlands.

== Distribution and conservation ==
Based on records from hunters Cotterill read, sassaby did not occur in central Zambia in the late 19th century, since at least 1881, and the northern Zambian population may have always been allopatrically separated. According to Cotterill, based on specimen and literature records, in the beginning of the 20th century it occurred from the northern corner of the Katanga Pedicle, through northernmost Serenje District, with the range continuing in a thin band in a northeasterly direction, between the Bangweulu Flats and the Muchinga Escarpment, towards an area a few dozen kilometres west of Isoka along the road to Kasama, around the upper Chambeshi river. Cotterill states that it had disappeared from the upper Chambeshi area around 1936. Schouteden recorded it east of the Luombwa river in the Democratic Republic of the Congo in 1946, vouchered with specimens at the Museum of Tervuren. Until the 1960s sassaby occurred on the Muku Muku Flats west of the road between Serenji and Mansa, the type specimen was collected here. In 2003 their existence in this area was doubtful, as was their occurrence immediately west in Katanga, but there was a healthy population persisting in parts of the southern Bangweulu Flats, with large herds in the Chikuni Game Management Area. It primarily resides in the Game Management Areas, in which the wildlife is not afforded the level of protection under Zambian law that it would receive in the National Parks.

In 1989 the population in the Bangweulu floodplain was estimated at 2,000 animals by the IUCN. Tsessebe in general, both in western Barotseland and Bangweulu, were the only antelope species considered locally 'vulnerable' in Zambia. This was because although the species was not thought to have lost much historical distribution, its distribution in Zambia is restricted, the population was thought to be small, and the low amount that the country was able to invest in protection at the time. In the case of the Bangweulu population specifically, the IUCN recommended that plans for the development needs of local inhabitants of the floodplain integrate conservation and utilisation programs for the antelope. In 1998 the IUCN reported that the conservation aspect of this had been a success. The population for the Bangweulu and Kafinda Game Management Areas was estimated at 3,500 in 1993 and rising. There were thirty tsessebe in private reserves. In 2008 the IUCN stated that there were no known threats, and there was no convincing evidence the population had declined by 20% or more over the last three generations (20 years), so the assessed the taxon as 'least concern' at the time. Based on the 1993 information (the IUCN cites the wrong date, 1999, for the publication, and the wrong date for the survey), the population at Bangweulu was estimated at 3,500 and was increasing. Based on aerial census counts of the floodplains, the numbers were increasing over the period 2011 to 2014. In 2017 the IUCN copy and pasted the exact same 2008 text: the population was estimated at 3,500 and was increasing, there was no convincing evidence the population had declined by 20% or more over the last three generations, and that there was therefore no justification to consider the taxon 'near threatened' or 'vulnerable'. For some reason it was rated 'vulnerable' in the graphic accompanying the assessment anyway.

== Hunting ==
The Bangweulu tsessebe in the Game Management Areas may be hunted in Zambia. For the purposes of trophy hunting, the Bangweulu tsessebe is not considered different than the common tsessebe with regards to Zambian trophy lists. Hunters must purchase permits, as well as pay trophy fees upon shooting an animal. Trophy fees range from US$1,600 to US$3,000 as of 2021. Hunters in the Bangweulu area are commonly offered 6-11 day extension packages including sassaby, lechwe and sitatunga, such packages cost from $17,000-$37,800. Local inhabitants of the floodplains occasionally hunt the animals for food under the permit system. In Zambia, the hunting season is from the beginning of May to the end of November. In the mid-1980s the Zambian government, with help from IUCN, USAID, WWF and WCS, launched a community-based wildlife management programme, the Administrative Management Design for Game Management Areas, under which management and revenues from both local and international hunting fees is shared between the government and the local community. As of 1996, although there have been some local issues, in general the programme has been a success.
