= Arabian Desert =

Desert located in Western Asia

Arabian Desert ٱلصَّحْرَاء ٱلْعَرَبِيَّة
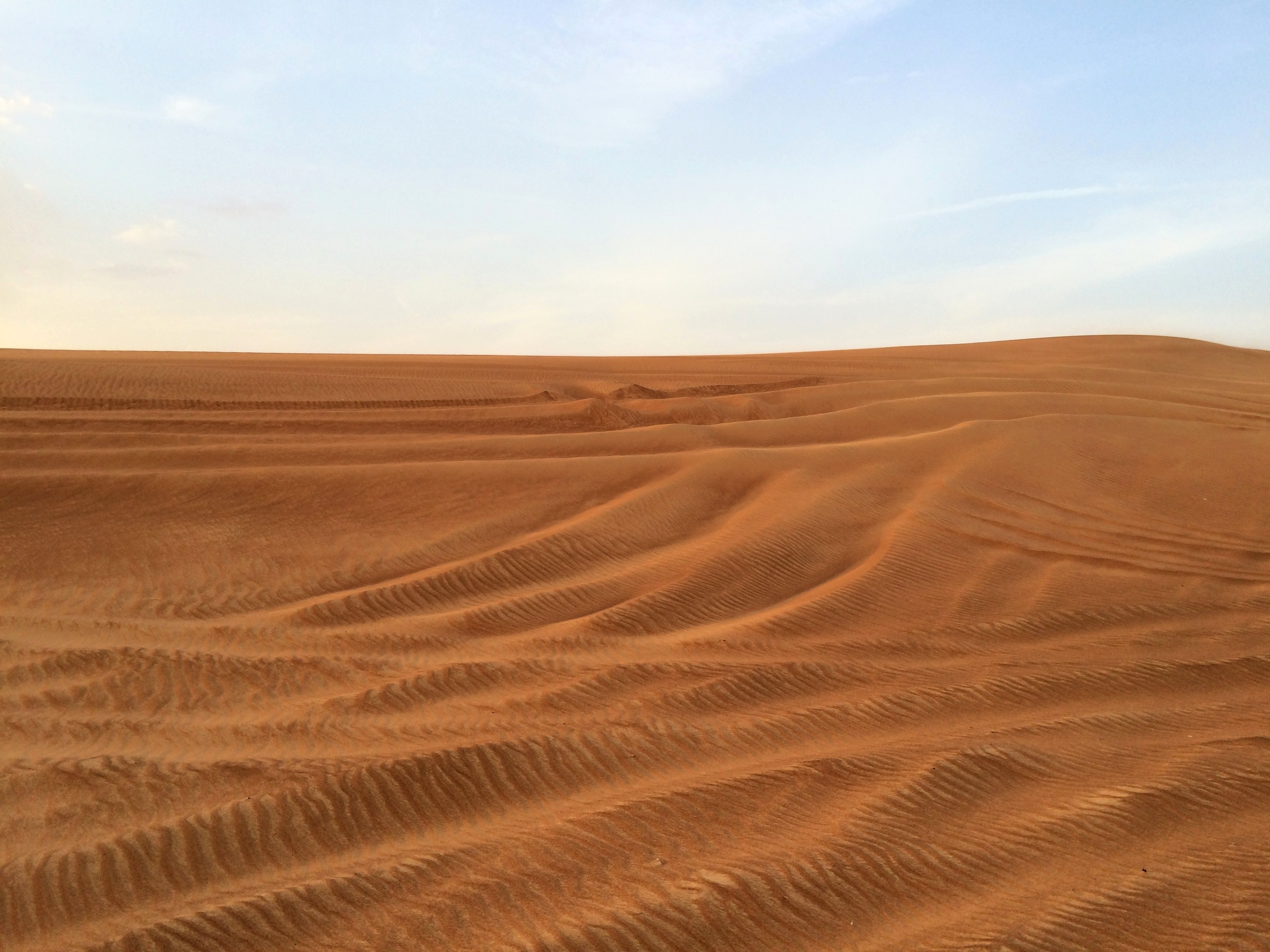
- Desert near Sharjah, United Arab Emirates

- Map of the Arabian Desert ecoregion

Ecology
- Realm: Palearctic
- Biome: deserts and xeric shrublands
- Borders: List: Gulf of Oman desert and semi-desert; Mesopotamian shrub desert; Middle East steppe; North Saharan steppe and woodlands; Persian Gulf desert and semi-desert; Red Sea Nubo-Sindian tropical desert and semi-desert; Tigris-Euphrates alluvial salt marsh

Geography
- Area: 1,855,470 km^{2} (716,400 mi^{2})
- Countries: List: Saudi Arabia; Iraq; Jordan; Kuwait; Oman; Qatar; United Arab Emirates; Iran (Khuzestan); Yemen; Israel; Egypt (Sinai)

Conservation
- Conservation status: critical/endangered
- Protected: 4.368%

The Arabian Desert (Arabic: ٱلصَّحْرَاء ٱلْعَرَبِيَّة) is a vast desert wilderness in West Asia that occupies almost the entire Arabian Peninsula with an area of 2,330,000 square kilometers (900,000 sq mi). It stretches from Yemen to the Persian Gulf and Oman to Jordan and Iraq. It is the fourth largest desert in the world and the largest in Asia. At its southern end is Ar-Rub' al-Khali (The Empty Quarter), the largest continuous body of sand in the world. It is an extension of the Sahara Desert.

Gazelles, oryx, sand cats, and spiny-tailed lizards are just some of the desert-adapted species that survive in this extreme environment, which features everything from red dunes to deadly quicksand. The climate is mostly dry (the major part receives around 100 mm (3.9 in) of rain per year, but some very rare places receive as little as 50 mm), and temperatures oscillate between very high heat and seasonal night time freezes. It is part of the deserts and xeric shrublands biome and lie in biogeographical realms of the Palearctic (northern part) and Afrotropical (southern part).

The Arabian Desert ecoregion has little biodiversity, although a few endemic plants grow here. Many species, such as the striped hyena, jackal and honey badger, have died out as a result of hunting, habitat destruction, overgrazing by livestock, off-road driving, and human encroachment on their habitat. Other species, such as the Arabian sand gazelle, have been successfully re-introduced and are protected at reserves.

== Geography ==
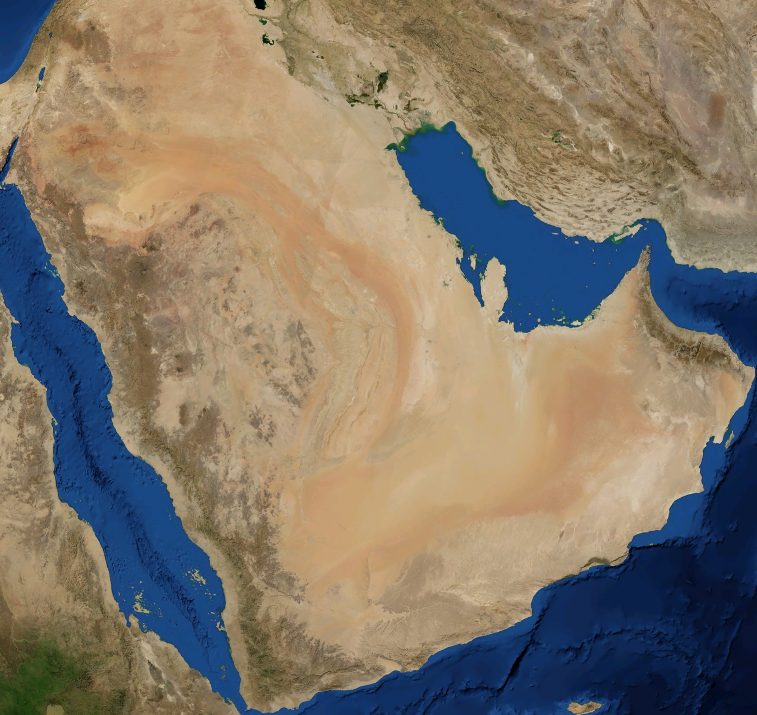
A satellite image of the Arabian Desert by NASA World Wind

The desert lies mostly in Saudi Arabia and covers most of the country. It extends into neighboring southern Iraq, southern Jordan, central Qatar, most of the Abu Dhabi emirate in the United Arab Emirates, western Oman, and northeastern Yemen. The ecoregion also includes most of the Sinai Peninsula in Egypt and the adjacent Negev desert in southern Israel.

The Rub' al-Khali desert is a sedimentary basin stretching along a south-west to north-east axis across the Arabian Shelf. At an altitude of 1,000 metres (3,300 ft), rock landscapes yield to the Rub' al-Khali, a vast stretch of sand whose extreme southern point crosses the center of Yemen. The sand overlies gravel or gypsum plains and the dunes reach maximum heights of up to 250 m (820 ft). The sands are predominantly silicates, composed of 80 to 90% quartz and the remainder feldspar, whose iron oxide-coated grains color the sands orange, purple, and red.

A corridor of sandy terrain known as the Ad-Dahna desert connects the An-Nafud desert (65,000 km^{2} or 25,000 square miles) in the north of Saudi Arabia to the Rub' al-Khali in the south-east. The Tuwaiq escarpment is an 800 km (500 mi) arc that includes limestone cliffs, plateaus, and canyons. There are brackish salt flats, including the quicksands of Umm al Samim. The Sharqiya Sands, formerly known as Wahiba Sands of Oman are an isolated sand sea bordering the east coast.

== Climate ==
The Arabian Desert has a subtropical, hot desert climate, similar to the climate of the Sahara Desert (the world's largest hot desert). The Arabian Desert is actually an extension of the Sahara Desert over the Arabian peninsula.

The climate is mainly dry. Most areas get around 100 mm (3.9 in) of rain per year. Unlike the Sahara Desert—more than half of which is hyperarid (having rainfall of less than 50 mm (2.0 in) per year)—the Arabian Desert has only a few hyperarid areas. These rare driest areas may get only 30 to 40 mm (1.6 in) of rain per year.

The Arabian Desert's sunshine duration index is very high by global standards: between 2,900 hours (66.2% of daylight hours) and 3,600 hours (82.1% of daylight hours), but typically around 3,400 hours (77.6% of daylight hours). Thus clear-sky conditions with plenty of sunshine prevail over the region throughout the year, and cloudy periods are infrequent. Visibility at ground level is relatively low, despite the brightness of the sun and moon, because of dust and humidity.

Temperatures remain high year round. In the summer, in low-lying areas, average high temperatures are generally over 40 °C (104 °F). In extremely low-lying areas, especially along the Persian Gulf (near sea level), summer temperatures can reach 48 °C (118 °F). Average low temperatures in summer are typically over 20 °C (68 °F) and in the south can sometimes exceed 30 °C (86 °F). Record high temperatures above 50 °C (122 °F) have been reached in many areas of the desert, partly because its overall elevation is relatively low.

== Flora and fauna ==
The Arabian Desert ecoregion has about 900 species of plants. The Rub'al-Khali has very limited floristic diversity. There are only 37 plant species, 20 recorded in the main body of the sands and 17 around the outer margins. Of these 37 species, one or two are endemic. Vegetation is very diffuse but fairly evenly distributed, with some interruptions of near sterile dunes. Some typical plants are Calligonum crinitum on dune slopes, Cornulaca arabica (saltbush), Salsola stocksii (saltbush), and Cyperus conglomeratus. Other widespread species are Dipterygium glaucum, Limeum arabicum, and Zygophyllum mandavillei. Very few trees are found except at the outer margin (typically Acacia ehrenbergiana and Prosopis cineraria). Other species are a woody perennial Calligonum comosum, and annual herbs such as Danthonia forskallii.

There are 102 native species of mammals. Native mammals include the Arabian oryx (Oryx leucoryx), sand gazelle (Gazella marica), mountain gazelle (G. gazella), Nubian ibex (Capra nubiana), Arabian wolf (Canis lupus arabs), striped hyaena (Hyaena hyaena), caracal (Caracal caracal), sand cat (Felis margarita), red fox (Vulpes vulpes), and Cape hare (Lepus capensis). The Asiatic cheetah and Asiatic lion used to live in the Arabian Desert. The ecoregion is home to 310 bird species.

== People ==
The area is home to several different cultures, languages, and peoples, with Islam as the predominant faith. The major ethnic group in the region is the Arabs, whose primary language is Arabic.

In the center of the desert lies Riyadh, the capital of Saudi Arabia, with more than 7 million inhabitants. Other large cities, such as Dubai, Abu Dhabi, or Kuwait City, lie on the coast of the Persian Gulf.

== Natural resources ==
Natural resources available in the Arabian Desert include oil, natural gas, phosphates, and sulfur.

== Conservation and threats ==
Threats to the ecoregion include overgrazing by livestock and feral camels and goats, wildlife poaching, and damage to vegetation by off-road driving.

The conservation status of the desert is critical/endangered. In the UAE, the sand gazelle and Arabian oryx are threatened, and honey badgers, jackals, and striped hyaenas already extirpated.

=== Protected areas ===
4.37% of the ecoregion is in protected areas.

Saudi Arabia has established a system of reserves overseen by the National Commission for Wildlife Conservation and Development (NCWCD).

- Harrat al-Harrah Reserve (12,150 km^{2}), established in 1987, is on the border with Jordan and Iraq, and protects a portion of the stony basaltic Harrat al-Sham desert. The reserve includes rough terrain of black basaltic boulders and extinct volcanic cones from the middle Miocene. It provides habitat to over 250 species of plants, 50 species of birds, and 22 mammal species.
- 'Uruq Bani Ma'arid Reserve (12,000 km^{2}) is on the western edge of the Rub’ al-Khali. Arabian oryx and sand gazelle were reintroduced to the reserve in 1995.
- Ibex Reserve (200 km^{2}) is south of Riyadh. It protects Nubian ibex and a reintroduced population of mountain gazelle.
- Al-Tabayq Special Nature Reserve is in northern Saudi Arabia, and protects a population of Nubian ibex.

Protected areas in the United Arab Emirates include Al Houbara Protected Area (2492.0 km^{2}), Al Ghadha Protected Area (1087.51 km^{2}), Arabian Oryx Protected Area (5974.47 km^{2}), Ramlah Protected Area (544.44 km^{2}), and Al Beda'a Protected Area (417.0 km^{2}).

== See also ==
- ʿĀd
- Iram of the Pillars
