= Jebel Irhoud =

Archaeological site in Morocco

- Adrar n Iɣud / ⴰⴷⵔⴰⵔ ⵏ ⵉⵖⵓⴷ
- جبل إيغود
- Jean-Jacques Hublin at Jebel Irhoud (Morocco), pointing to the crushed human skull (Irhoud 10), whose orbits are visible just beyond his finger tip

- Location in Morocco
- 31°51′18″N 8°52′21″W
- Periods: Lower Paleolithic
- Associated with: Homo sapiens
- Location: East of Safi / northwest from Marakech
- Region: Morocco

Site notes
- Height: 592 m (1,942 ft)
- Excavation dates: 1961, 1967 & 1969; (JT & dBdH), 1991

Jebel Irhoud (Arabic: جبل إيغود, Moroccan Arabic: žbəl iġud) or Adrar n Ighoud (Standard Moroccan Tamazight: ⴰⴷⵔⴰⵔ ⵏ ⵉⵖⵓⴷ, romanized: Adrar n Iɣud), is an archaeological site in Morocco located just north of the town of Tlet Ighoud in Youssoufia Province, approximately 50 km (30 mi) southeast of the city of Safi.

It is noted for the hominin fossils that have been found there since the discovery of the site in 1961. Originally thought to be Neanderthals, the specimens have since been assigned to Homo sapiens and, as reported in 2017, have been dated to a "weighted average age" of 315,000 years ago. This makes the remains by far the earliest known examples of H. sapiens, and suggests that rather than arising in East Africa approximately 200,000 years ago, modern humans were present across the length of Africa 100,000 years earlier.

== Site ==
The site is the remnant of a solutional cave filled with 8 metres (26 ft) of deposits from the Pleistocene era, located on the eastern side of a karstic outcrop of limestone at an elevation of 562 metres (1,844 ft). It was discovered in 1961 when the area was being mined for the mineral baryte. A miner discovered a skull in the wall of the cave, extracted it, and gave it to an engineer, who kept it as a souvenir for a time. Eventually, it was handed over to the University of Rabat, which organized a joint French-Moroccan expedition to the site that was headed by anthropologist Émile Ennouchi.

=== Excavation history ===
Ennouchi and his team began their excavation of Jebel Irhoud in 1961. Before beginning excavation, Ennouchi's team removed 2000 tons of debris that covered the archaeological layers using low-level explosives. The excavation completed by Ennouchi's team used horizontal arbitrary 50 cm stratigraphic layers, or spits. Ennouchi's team identified the remains of approximately 30 species of mammals, some of which are associated with the Middle Pleistocene, but the stratigraphic provenance of these remains is unknown. During the Ennouchi excavations, two hominin fossils, Irhoud 2 and Irhoud 3, were discovered and identified as an adult and a child. The associated lithic technology was identified as Mousterian, leading the Irhoud hominins to initially be identified as Neanderthals. Ennouchi's team was also the first to attempt to date the site. They used radiocarbon dating, but their results revealed that the site was older than 50,000 years and was thus beyond the measurement capabilities of radiocarbon dating.

Another excavation was carried out by Jacques Tixier and Roger de Bayle des Hermens in 1967 and 1969, during which 22 layers were identified in the cave in search of more hominin fossils. Irhoud 4 and 5 were identified during these excavations and were the first human remains found within a known stratigraphic context at the site, and were found in association with the Levallois Mousterian tool industry.

Jean-Jacque Hublin conducted more recent excavations beginning in 2004. These excavations continued the work of the 1960s excavations, performing a more detailed study of site stratigraphy and context. It was during these excavations that Irhoud 10 and Irhoud 11 were discovered, both of which were identified as adults. Recent work identifies the Jebel Irhoud individuals as early members of the H. sapiens clade.

=== Stratigraphy ===
The site's stratigraphic layers were originally defined during the excavations in the late 1980s. Differently defined stratigraphic layers were identified during more recent research, this time using geological principles. A description of the more recent site stratigraphy is as follows: Layers 1-3 do not contain much archaeological material, layers 4-6 contain some archaeological material (lithic tools) and zooarchaeological remains (primarily Gazella species), Layer 7 contains sediment described as "cemented" and contains a higher density of archaeological materials (lithic tools, some burnt) and zooarchaeological remains (primarily bovids) than the upper layers and corresponds to layers where the first Jebel Irhoud fossils were found.

=== Geology ===
Jebel Irhoud is a site with much geological diversity, including Triassic formations and Charkarkar cave, and Ganntour phosphate deposits. The current geomorphology of Jebel Irhoud was created during an event called the Hercynian orogeny. This event occurred between 310 and 280 Ma and created westward vergent folds. Three primary geological formation contributing to the Jebel Irhoud landscape: (1) Barite veins, (2) zones of barite or "substitution," and (3) karst deposits.

== Dating ==
=== Early work: morphology and lithic technology ===
The skull finds were initially interpreted as Neanderthal by Ennouchi in his 1962 publication. Based on anatomical similarity with finds from Skhul, Omo, and Jebel Qafza, Santa Luca determined Jebel Irhoud 1 was not Neanderthal (published 1978).

The remains had archaic phenotypical features believed to be representative of the Neanderthals rather than H. sapiens. They were thought to be approximately 40,000 years old, but this was thrown into doubt by faunal evidence suggesting a Middle Pleistocene date (see: Faunal Remains and Environmental Context), approximately 160,000 years ago. Because of that, the fossils were reappraised as representing an archaic form of Homo sapiens or perhaps a population of Homo sapiens that had interbred with Neanderthals. This was consistent with the concept that the then-oldest-known remains of Homo sapiens, dated to approximately 195,000 years ago and found in Omo Kibish, Ethiopia, indicated an eastern African origin for humans at approximately 200,000 years ago. The Ethiopian Omo remains were more recently dated to about 233,000 years old.

=== Recent dating methods: thermoluminescence dating and burnt lithics ===
Dating carried out by the Max Planck Institute for Evolutionary Anthropology in Leipzig revealed that the Jebel Irhoud site was far older than first thought. Fresh excavations carried out in 2004 by the Hublin team revealed more than 20 new bones from the remains of at least five individuals as well as a number of stone tools. The remains included part of a skull, a jawbone, teeth, and limb bones belonging to three adults; there were also those of a juvenile and a child aged about seven-and-a-half years old.

Some of the tools had been burned due to fires being lit on top of them, presumably after they had been discarded. Researchers used thermoluminescence dating to ascertain when the burning of these stone tools occurred and, by proxy, the age of the fossil bones that were found in the same deposit layer.

In 2017, the burnt tools were dated to approximately 315,000 years ago, indicating that the fossils are of approximately the same age. This conclusion was confirmed by recalculating the age of the Irhoud 3 mandible, which produced an age range compatible with that of the tools, at roughly 280,000 to 350,000 years old (286±32 ka for the Irhoud 3 mandible, 315±34 ka based on other fossils and the flint artefacts found nearby). These dates make the remains by far the earliest known examples of Homo sapiens.

This suggests that rather than arising in East Africa approximately 200,000 years ago, modern humans may have been present across the length of Africa 100,000 years earlier. According to study author Jean-Jacques Hublin, "The idea is that early Homo sapiens dispersed around the continent and elements of human modernity appeared in different places, and so different parts of Africa contributed to the emergence of what we call modern humans today." Early humans may have comprised a large, interbreeding population dispersed across Africa approximately 330,000 to 300,000 years ago. Thus, the rise of modern humans may have taken place on a continental scale rather than being confined to a particular corner of Africa.

== Human remains ==
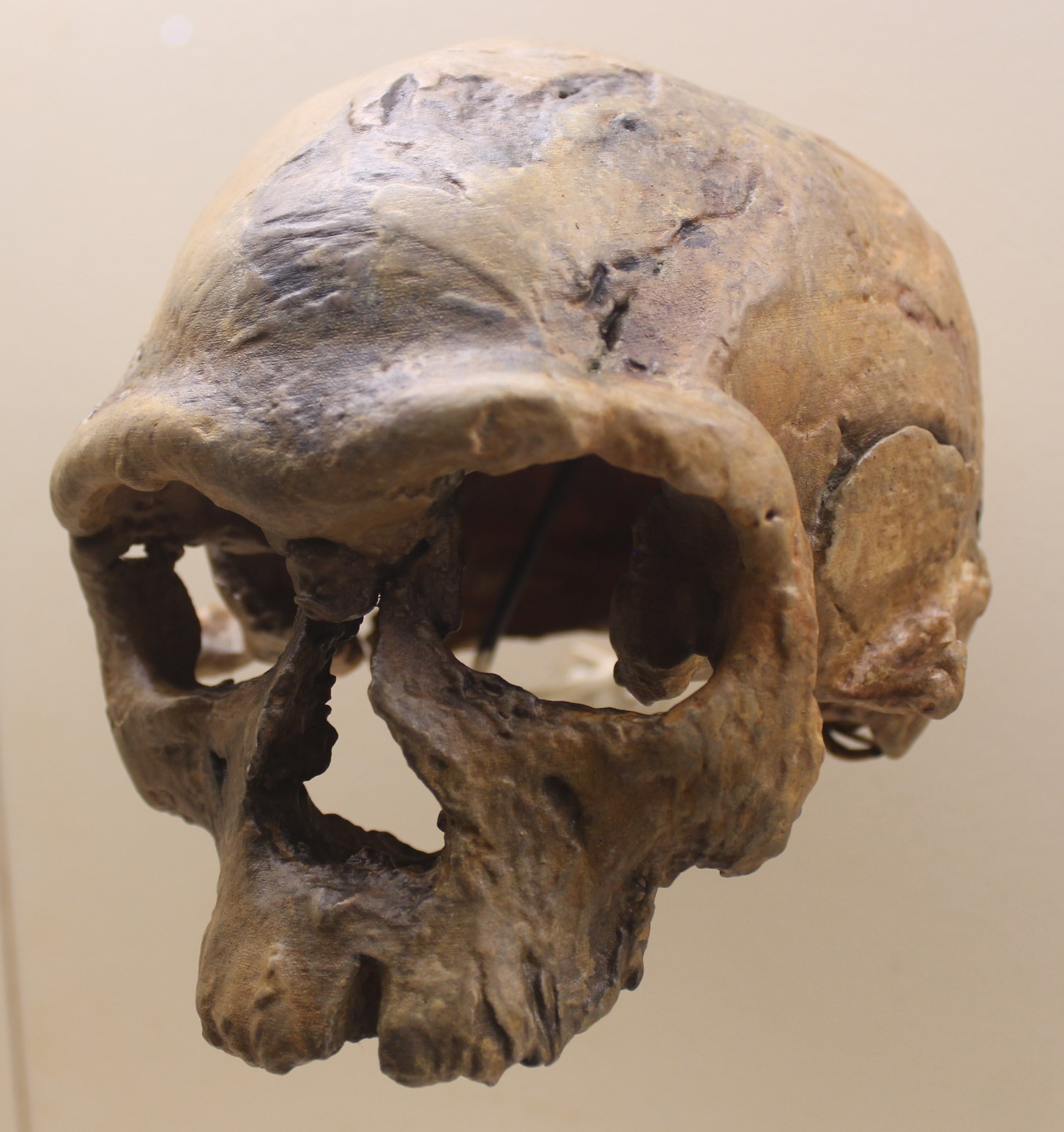
Jebel Irhoud-1, dated 286±32 kya, Smithsonian Natural History Museum

The site is most famous for its hominin fossils, and since its discovery, twenty-two hominin fossil remains have been found at Jebel Irhoud. When first discovered, they were interpreted as Neanderthal remains. Since then, they have also been suggested as being an early form of H. sapiens that interbred with Neanderthals, or they represented a different late-surviving archaic population in Africa. Recent research disputes these claims, concluding that the Jebel Irhoud hominin remains represent an early form of the H. sapiens clade, present during the Middle Pleistocene.

Ennouchi discovered a skull that he named Irhoud 1. It is now on display in the Rabat Archaeological Museum. The following year, he discovered part of another skull, designated Irhoud 2, and subsequently uncovered the lower mandible of a child, designated Irhoud 3. Tixier's excavation found a humerus designated Irhoud 4, and a hip bone recorded as Irhoud 5.

Further excavations were carried out by American researchers during the 1990s and then by a team led by Jean-Jacques Hublin starting in 2004. Hublin and colleagues recently discovered Irhoud 10 and 11, both of which were identified as adults and were integral in determining the species classification of the hominin remains. Hublin and colleagues have also provided the following table of hominin remains found at Jebel Irhoud.

Jebel Irhoud Specimen List
Specimens	Item ID	Anatomical Part	Year	Stratigraphic Position
Irhoud 1	No ID	Cranium	1961	Lower deposits
Irhoud 2	No ID	Cranium	1962	Lower deposits
Irhoud 3	No ID	Mandible (juvenile)	1968	Lower deposits
Irhoud 4	No ID	Humerus (juvenile)	1969	Layer 18 of Tixier
Irhoud 5	No ID	Coxal (juvenile)	1969	Layer 18 of de Bayle des Hermens & Tixier
Irhoud 6	No ID	Mandible fragment	1961-69	Identified among faunal remains
Irhoud 7	4766	Lower right first premolar	2004	Initial cleaning
Irhoud 8	4767	Distal part of left lower molar	2004	Initial cleaning
Irhoud 9	1653	First or second lower molar	2006	Layer 4
Irhoud 10	1678, 1679, 1680, 2178, 2259	Cranium	2007	Layer 7
Irhoud 11	4765, 3752	Mandible	2007	Layer 7
Irhoud 12	2196	Lower incisor	2007	Layer 7
Irhoud 13	2252	Left proximal femur	2007	Layer 7
Irhoud 14	2381, 2383	Rib	2009	Layer 7
Irhoud 15	2401	Rib	2009	Layer 7
Irhoud 16	2561, 2565	Humerus (juvenile)	2009	Layer 7
Irhoud 17	2670	Right proximal femur	2009	Layer 7
Irhoud 18	2838	Lumbar vertebra	2007	Initial cleaning
Irhoud 19	3747, 3748, 3749	Fibula	2009	Layer 7
Irhoud 20	3751	Cervical vertebra	2009	Initial cleaning
Irhoud 21	4200	Maxilla	2011	Layer A
Irhoud 22	4502, 4503	Upper second and third right molars	2011	Layer A

Hublin and his team also attempted unsuccessfully to obtain DNA samples from the hominin fossils, which would have provided necessary evidence towards the conclusion that these fossils are representative of the main lineage leading up to modern humanity and that Homo sapiens had dispersed and developed all across Africa. Because of the unclear boundaries between different species of the genus Homo, and the lack of genomic evidence from these fossils, some doubt the classification of these fossils as Homo sapiens.

=== Morphology ===
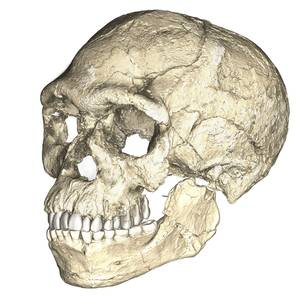
A composite reconstruction of the earliest-known Homo sapiens fossils from Jebel Irhoud, based on micro-computed tomographic scans of multiple original fossils

The most important anatomical considerations when classifying the Jebel Irhoud remains are these specimens' facial/cranial, dental, and mandibular morphologies. Recent studies based on these morphological attributes have identified the Jebel Irhoud individuals as being closer aligned with modern human morphology than archaic hominin morphology, placing them within the early stages of the Homo sapiens clade.

Excavations carried out in 2004 by the Hublin team revealed more than 20 new bones from the remains of at least five individuals and stone tools. The finds included part of a skull, a jawbone, teeth, and limb bones that had come from three adults, a juvenile, and a child aged about seven-and-a-half years old. The facial characteristics of the skull resemble modern H. sapiens but had much larger lower jaws and more elongated posterior braincases. They have similar features to the Florisbad Skull, which dates to 260,000 years ago, discovered in Florisbad, South Africa. The Florisbad Skull has now been attributed to Homo sapiens as a result of the Jebel Irhoud finds.

==== Facial and cranial morphology ====
Modern and early modern human facial morphology is defined by a short face that sits underneath the braincase. The Jebel Irhoud individuals also had very thick brow ridges and lacked prognathism, although more recent work has shown that brow ridges among the Jebel Irhoud hominins are variable and may be attributed to sexual dimorphism. Despite some of these facial attributes that might look archaic, statistical analyses have placed the facial shape of the Jebel Irhoud specimens (specifically 1 & 11) as being more closely related to early and recent modern humans. This research was completed using 3D facial reconstructions of fossil specimens.

When comparing the Jebel Irhoud fossils with those of modern humans, the main difference is the elongated shape of the braincase. According to the researchers, this indicates that brain shape, and possibly brain functions, evolved within the Homo sapiens lineage and relatively recently. Evolutionary changes in brain shape are likely associated with genetic changes in brain organization, interconnection, and development and may reflect adaptive changes in the way the brain functions. Such changes may have caused the human brain to become rounder and two regions in the brain's posterior region to enlarge during thousands of years of evolution.

==== Dentition ====
The dental morphology of the Jebel Irhoud individuals also aligns more closely to early modern humans than to archaic hominins. Although researchers note that their teeth are larger than early modern humans, their third maxillary molar (M3), crown morphology, and molar morphological complexity still place them closer to early modern humans than Neanderthals. The degree of tooth development found in the Jebel Irhoud hominins is similar to that of modern European children of the same age, but teeth roots develop faster than for modern humans (and slower than for apes and some other fossil hominids). Tooth crowns took a longer time to form than in modern humans.

==== Mandibular morphology ====
Mandibular morphology refers to the size and shape of the mandible or jaw. The most convincing evidence from the study of the Jebel Irhoud specimens' mandibular morphology comes from Irhoud 3. Irhoud 3 has an inverted T-shaped chin, something typically found in Homo sapiens.

While the Jebel Irhoud specimens initially were noted to have been similar to later Aterian and Iberomaurusian specimens, further examinations revealed that the Jebel Irhoud specimens differ from them. The Jebel Irhoud specimens have a continuous supraorbital torus, while the Aterian and Iberomaurasian specimens have a discontinuous supraorbital torus or, in some cases, none at all. From this, it was concluded that the Jebel Irhoud specimens represent archaic Homo sapiens while the Aterian and Iberomaurasian specimens represent anatomically modern Homo sapiens. Despite this, it was noted that the Jebel Irhoud specimen, whose cranium was complete enough to assess, showed "hints of 'modern' basicranial flexion in the relationship of the face and vault," and the teeth of another Jebel Irhoud specimen were subjected to synchrotron analysis that suggested "a modern developmental pattern."

== Stone tools ==
The stone tool/lithic assemblage has been associated with Mousterian lithic assemblages, but more recently has been described as a Middle Stone Age assemblage due to the presence of prepared core or Levallois technology and the desire to move towards the usage of an African industry name instead of a European one.

Scrapers are the most common tool type found in the assemblage (specifically Mousterian points and déjeté scrapers), accompanied by cores, piercers, notched pieces, and some flake debris. Researchers have noticed that the assemblage contains many retouched tools. Bifacial tools and tools indicative of the Aterian industry are also missing from the assemblage.

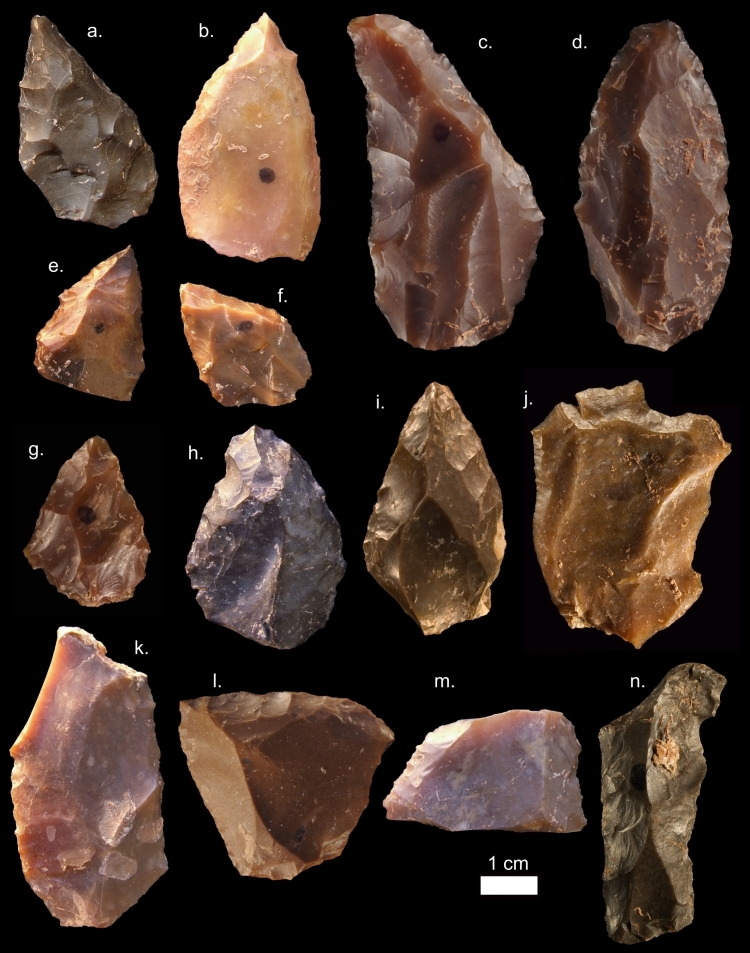
Stone tools found at Jebel Irhoud

Recent analyses of the lithic assemblages suggest that Trixier's original observations of the lithic assemblages excavated in the 1960s are still consistent in relation to recently excavated assemblages. This assemblage's most common raw materials are flint/chert, quartzite, and quartz. Of these raw materials flint/chert tools are more commonly retouched. The raw material source for the flint tools has been identified as Jebel Khiyyat (Mekala). Jebel Khiyyat is 30 km. south of Jebel Irhoud. The low frequencies of flake debris relative to complete tools and high percentage of retouched tools have caused researchers to suggest that little knapping occurred on-site. The presence of stone tools that have been burned alongside faunal remains and evidence of butchery suggests that the tools were probably used alongside fires at Jebel Irhoud.

== Faunal remains and environmental context ==
The faunal assemblage from Jebel Irhoud includes numerous rodents, golden jackal, gazelle (outnumbers all other bovids), Alcelaphine species, leopards, lions, small cats, hyena, and wild boar. Of the faunal remains, only one gazelle bone shows evidence of carnivore chewing (from Layer 6), while most bones in the cave indicate human butchery. Cut marks on small and large bovid ribs, tibia, and humeri occur in layers 4, 6, and 7. The breakage patterns found on these bones are associated with breakage occurring when the animal bones were fresh, i.e., recently killed. Percussion markings on the ends of long bones also hint at potential modification for bone marrow extraction. Also among the faunal assemblages are ostrich egg shells, although more work is needed before assuming that this results from anthropogenic accumulation.

The rodent assemblage was likely accumulated by a carnivore (such as an owl), indicating a Late Middle Pleistocene date for the site. The rodent assemblage, such as the inclusion of G. grandis and Ellobius, also indicates that grasslands probably dominated the surrounding landscape and that during the Middle Pleistocene, the Jebel Irhoud environment was less arid than during the Upper Pleistocene. This is based on the prevalence of muris in the mammalian records of the Middle Pleistocene layer recovered during the Ennouchi excavations, and the reduced species diversity found in the Upper Pleistocene. The presence of muris in the Middle Pleistocene levels indicates a warmer and more humid climate than an arid one.

The fauna listed by Ennouchi were: Rhinoceros mercki K., Equus mauritanicus P., Asinus africanus S., Canis anthus F.C., Gazella atlantica B., G. cuvieri O., G. tingitana A., G. rufina A., Alcelaphus bubalis P., Connochoetes taurinus prognu P., Bos ibericus S., B. primigenius B., Otis tarda L., Struthio sp.

== Cultural importance ==
In recent years, Jebel Irhoud has been identified as an important place for tourism and cultural heritage, both for its anthropological and geological importance. Recently, the Jebel Irhoud geosite was approved to become a part of the larger Youssoufia geopark project. Proposals to increase tourism to the site have been made with a variety of potential economic and conservational benefits for the area. Additionally, the surrounding area has been highlighted for its potential for barite mining; however, tourism safety concerns have been raised regarding the mining operations. Currently, tourist resources are only available after a while near Jebel Irhoud but are present in nearby towns.

== See also ==
- List of fossil sites (with link directory)
- List of human evolution fossils (with images)
- List of transitional fossils
