= Chambi National Park =

National park in Tunisia

- Djebel Chambi in the middle

- Location within Tunisia
- Location: Tunisia
- Coordinates: 35.186857°N 8.636255°E
- Area: 67.23 km^{2} (25.96 sq mi)
- Established: 1980

Chambi National Park (sometimes Chambi Mountain National Park or Djebel Chambi National Park) is a national park in Tunisia's Kasserine Governorate. Located in the country's west-central part, the park is close to the border with Algeria. It protects the flora and fauna surrounding Mount Chambi (Djebel Chambi), the highest mountain peak (1,544m above sea level) in Tunisia.

The park is part of the Mont de Tebessa forest massif which spans the area from Kasserine to the Algerian border. The parks has no permanent rivers or streams, but it is one of the last refuges of the endangered Cuvier's gazelle and home to the vulnerable Barbary sheep. The park is also the site of notable plant life (holm oak and Cotoneaster nummularius, Aleppo pine, and Stipa tenacissima) and birds (including the Tunisian crossbill, the Egyptian vulture, Bonelli's eagle, and the peregrine falcon, among others).

In 1970, a 300-hectare (740-acre) fenced reserve was established to protect Cuvier's gazelle. In 1977, the park and its surrounding areas were designated a UNESCO biosphere reserve. The 6,723-hectare (16,610-acre) park was established as a national park in 1980.
