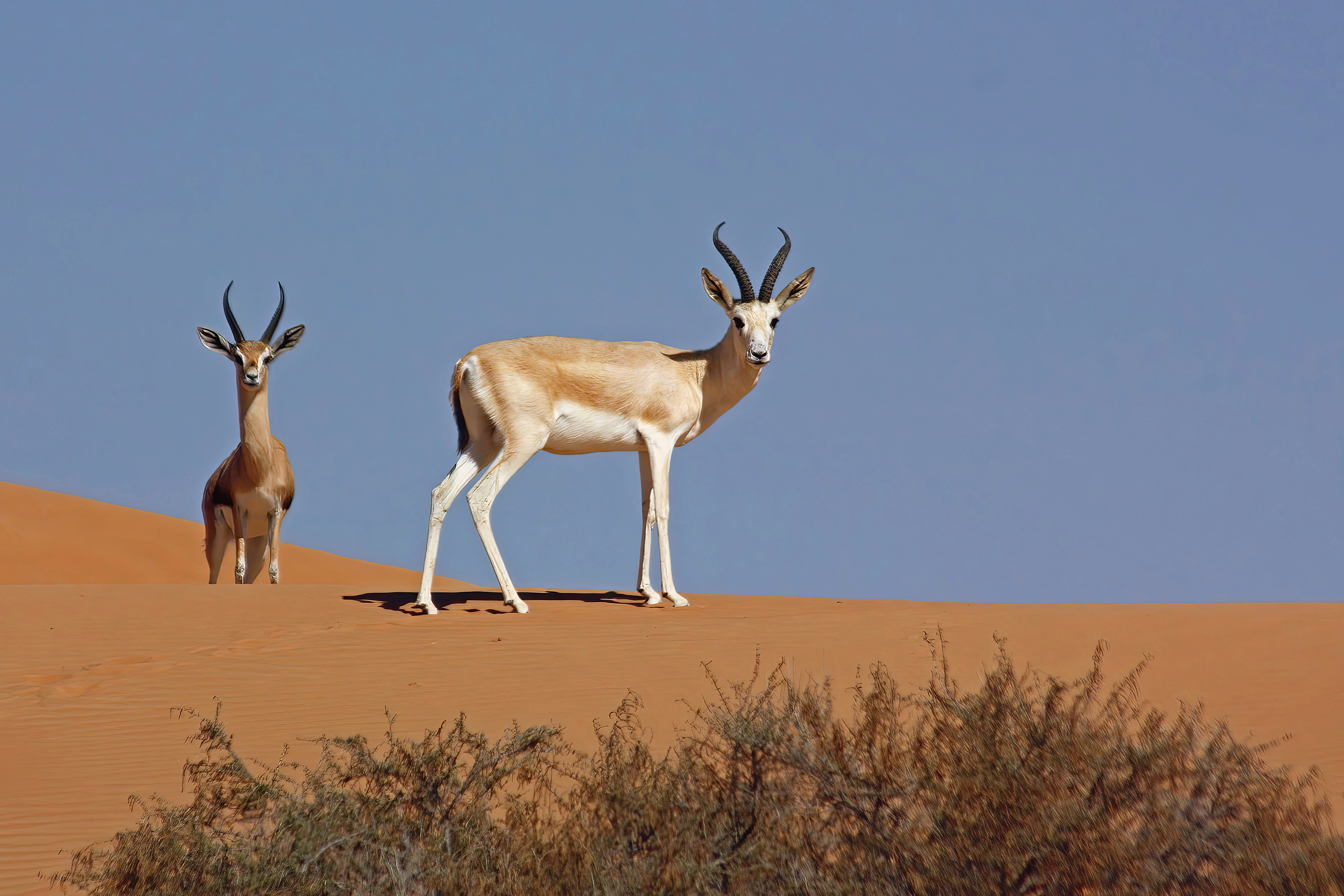
- Arabian sand gazelle on the right

Conservation status
- Vulnerable (IUCN 3.1)

Scientific classification
- Kingdom: Animalia
- Phylum: Chordata
- Class: Mammalia
- Infraclass: Placentalia
- Order: Artiodactyla
- Family: Bovidae
- Subfamily: Antilopinae
- Genus: Gazella
- Species: G. marica

Binomial name
- Gazella marica (Thomas, 1897)
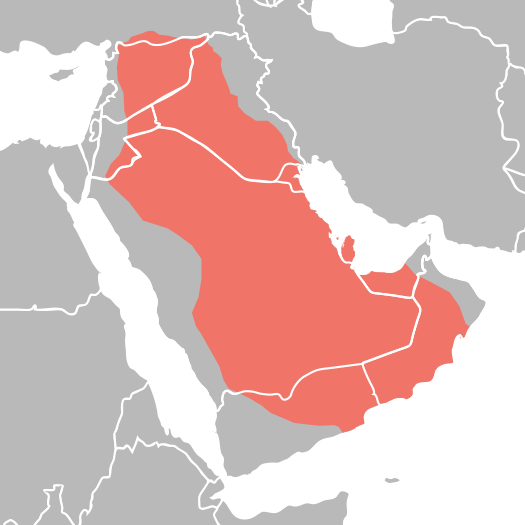
- Gazella marica distribution

Synonyms
- Gazella subgutturosa marica Thomas, 1897

= Arabian sand gazelle =

Species of mammal

The Arabian sand gazelle (Gazella marica) or reem (Arabic: ريم) is a species of gazelle native to the Arabian and Syrian Deserts.

== Distribution and conservation ==
Today it survives in the wild in small, isolated populations in Saudi Arabia, the United Arab Emirates, Oman, and southeastern Turkey. Small numbers may also be present in Kuwait, Iraq, Jordan, and Syria. The total population of wild sand gazelles is thought to be less than 3,000. Significantly more are held in captivity, reserves, or breeding programs, perhaps more than 100,000.

== Taxonomy ==
Until recently, the sand gazelle was considered a subspecies of the goitered gazelle (Gazella subgutturosa), as Gazella subgutturosa marica. A 2010 genetic study established that it was a distinct lineage, and it is now considered a separate species. Further genetic analysis reported in 2012 found that the sand gazelle was closely related to two North African gazelles, Cuvier's gazelle (Gazella cuvieri) and the rhim (Gazella leptoceros), perhaps even belonging to a single species.
