= Jebel ech Chambi =

Highest mountain in Tunisia (1,544 m)

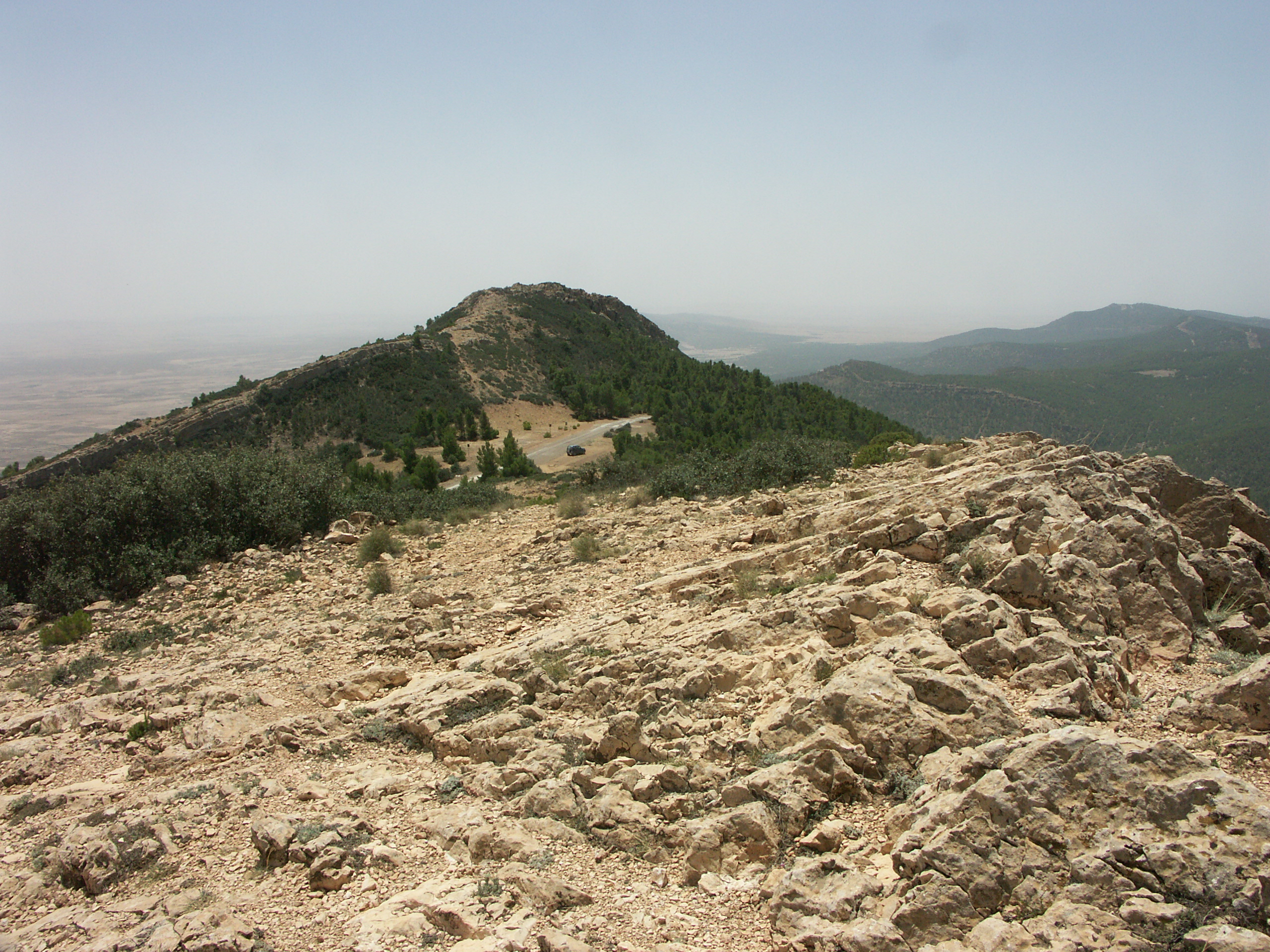

Highest point
- Elevation: 1,544 m (5,066 ft)
- Listing: Country high point
- Coordinates: 35°12′24″N 08°40′59″E

Geography
- Location within Tunisia Location within Mediterranean Location within Africa
- Location: Tunisia
- Parent range: Aurès Mountains

Jebel ech Chambi (Arabic: جبل الشعانبي Jabal ash-Sha‘ānabī; also Mount Ash-Sha'nabi) is a mountain peak in Tunisia. At an elevation of 1,544 m (5,066 ft), it is the highest mountain in the country. It stands above the city of Kasserine in western central Tunisia. The summit is covered by a pine forest and is part of Chambi National Park.

== Description ==
Jebel ech Chambi is a peak of the Monts de Tébessa, part of the Aurès Mountains, at the eastern end of the Atlas Mountains in the centre-west of Tunisia, 17 km (11 mi) north-west of the city of Kasserine and a few kilometres from the Algerian border. It can be reached by a track suitable for all-terrain vehicles to an altitude of 1,300 m (4,265 ft). Afterwards, a two-hour hike provides access to the summit. It was Les Scouts Tunisiens, in the aftermath of the country's independence in 1956, who placed a metal crescent, a symbol of Islam, to mark their ascent.

This limestone mountain is deeply gouged and seared by erosion. It is composed of caliche, a sedimentary rock, a hardened natural cement of calcium carbonate that binds other materials together. There seem to have been three cycles of sedimentation, with the layers being separated by red bands of palygorskite, a clayey detrital deposit.

Since December 2012, Jebel ech Chambi has been the theatre of many military operations of Tunisian armed forces against groups of Islamist terrorists hidden in the caves of the mountain.

== Biosphere Reserve ==
UNESCO designated Jebel ech Chambi as a biosphere reserve in 1977. The total area of the reserve is 43,723 hectares (108,040 acres), with a core area of 6,723 hectares (16,610 acres). About 8,000 people live within the reserve, mostly subsistence farmers raising livestock, growing cereals, keeping bees and growing trees as a plantation crop. The core area was inaugurated as Chambi National Park in 1980 to protect the natural environment of the massif.

== Ecology ==
Some plant communities on the mountain are dominated by holm oak, Stipa fontanesii, Stipa senecia, Sorbus aria and Cotoneaster nummularius. Elsewhere, there are forests containing Pinus halepensis, holm oak, rosemary, Globularia alypum and Phoenicean juniper. On the lower slopes are steppe grassland with esparto grass. These mountains are one of the last places in which Cuvier's gazelles survive, and Barbary sheep are also found here. Bird species include the red crossbill, the Egyptian vulture, the Bonelli's eagle and the peregrine falcon.

Chambi National Park, Jebel ech Chambi in the middle
