= Gazella praegaudryi =

Gazella praegaudryi Temporal range: Miocene

Scientific classification
- Domain: Eukaryota
- Kingdom: Animalia
- Phylum: Chordata
- Class: Mammalia
- Order: Artiodactyla
- Family: Bovidae
- Subfamily: Antilopinae
- Tribe: Antilopini
- Genus: Gazella
- Species: †G. praegaudryi

Binomial name
- †Gazella praegaudryi Arambourg, 1959

Extinct species of mammal

Gazella praegaudryi was a small species of prehistoric gazelle described from late Miocene sediments near Bou Hanifia, Algeria. It had lightly compressed horn cores and no forward turning metaconid of its P4 premolars, differentiating it from the earlier Miocene Gazella dentition recovered at Fort Ternan.

It has been characterized as "similar" to, though morphologically distinct from, fossils excavated from formations such as at Fort Ternan, Lothagam, and Namulungle.
