= Gazella atlantica =

Gazella atlantica Temporal range: Late Pleistocene

Scientific classification
- Domain: Eukaryota
- Kingdom: Animalia
- Phylum: Chordata
- Class: Mammalia
- Order: Artiodactyla
- Family: Bovidae
- Subfamily: Antilopinae
- Tribe: Antilopini
- Genus: Gazella
- Species: †G. atlantica

Binomial name
- †Gazella atlantica (Bourguignat, 1870)

Extinct species of bovid

Gazella atlantica, the Atlantic gazelle, is an extinct species of gazelle that lived in Northwest Africa during the Late Pleistocene.

== Taxonomy ==
The Atlantic gazelle was described in 1870 from late Quaternary cave deposits at Jebel Thaya in Algeria. Fossils are relatively common across Algeria and Morocco. The Atlantic gazelle is closely related to Gazella tingitana, another extinct gazelle from the Late Pleistocene of North Africa.

== Description ==
The Atlantic gazelle was a small species of antelope, estimated at around 20 kg (44 lb). It would have been roughly comparable in size to the Speke's gazelle, which is generally considered the smallest living gazelle.

== Paleoecology ==
Fossils of the Atlantic gazelle have been found alongside those of wildebeest (Connochaetes taurinus) and hartebeest (Alcelaphus buselaphus) suggesting a habitat preference for open grasslands.

In a published paper, anthropologist Richard G. Klein suggested that the Atlantic gazelle may have persisted into the Holocene as recently as 4,000 BP (along with Camelus thomasi and Megaceroides). However, these claims cannot be substantiated, and the latest fossils of this species are dated to between 100 and 37 ka (100,000 - 37,000 years).
