= Gazella lydekkeri =

Gazella lydekkeri Temporal range: Neogene

Scientific classification
- Kingdom: Animalia
- Phylum: Chordata
- Class: Mammalia
- Order: Artiodactyla
- Family: Bovidae
- Subfamily: Antilopinae
- Genus: Gazella
- Species: †G. lydekkeri

Binomial name
- †Gazella lydekkeri Pilgrim, 1937

Extinct species of mammal

Gazella lydekkeri is an extinct species of Gazella that lived during the Neogene period.

== Taxonomy ==
Gazella padriensis is a junior synonym of G. lydekkeri.

== Distribution ==
Gazella lydekkeri lived in Pakistan.
