= Gazelle =

Gazella Temporal range: Miocene-Recent 14–0 Ma
- Chinkara from Thar Desert, Rajasthan, India

Scientific classification
- Kingdom: Animalia
- Phylum: Chordata
- Class: Mammalia
- Order: Artiodactyla
- Family: Bovidae
- Subfamily: Antilopinae
- Tribe: Antilopini
- Genus: Gazella; Blainville, 1816

Type species
- Capra dorcas (Linnaeus, 1758)

Species
- Several, see text

Genus of mammals

A gazelle is one of many antelope species in the genus Gazella /ɡəˈzɛlə/. There are also seven species included in two further genera; Eudorcas and Nanger, which were formerly considered subgenera of Gazella. A third former subgenus, Procapra, includes three living species of Asian gazelles.

Gazelles are known as swift animals. Some can run at bursts as high as 100 km/h (60 mph) or run at a sustained speed of 50 km/h (30 mph). Gazelles are found mostly in the deserts, grasslands, and savannas of Africa, but they are also found in southwest and central Asia and the Indian subcontinent. They tend to live in herds, and eat fine, easily digestible plants and leaves.

Gazelles are relatively small antelopes, most standing 60–110 cm (2–3.5 ft) high at the shoulder, and are generally fawn-colored.

The gazelle genera are Gazella, Eudorcas, and Nanger. The taxonomy of these genera is confused, and the classification of species and subspecies has been an unsettled issue. Currently, the genus Gazella is widely considered to contain about 10 species. One species is extinct: the Queen of Sheba's gazelle. Most surviving gazelle species are considered threatened to varying degrees. Closely related to the true gazelles are the Tibetan goa, and Mongolian gazelles (species of the genus Procapra), the blackbuck of Asia, and the African springbok.

One widely familiar gazelle is the African species Thomson's gazelle (Eudorcas thomsonii), sometimes referred to as a "tommie". It is around 60 to 70 cm (24 to 28 in) in shoulder height and is coloured brown and white with a distinguishing black stripe. The males have long, often curved, horns. Like many other prey species, tommies exhibit a distinctive behaviour of stotting (running and jumping high before fleeing) when they are threatened by predators such as cheetahs, lions, African wild dogs, crocodiles, hyenas, and leopards.

== Etymology ==
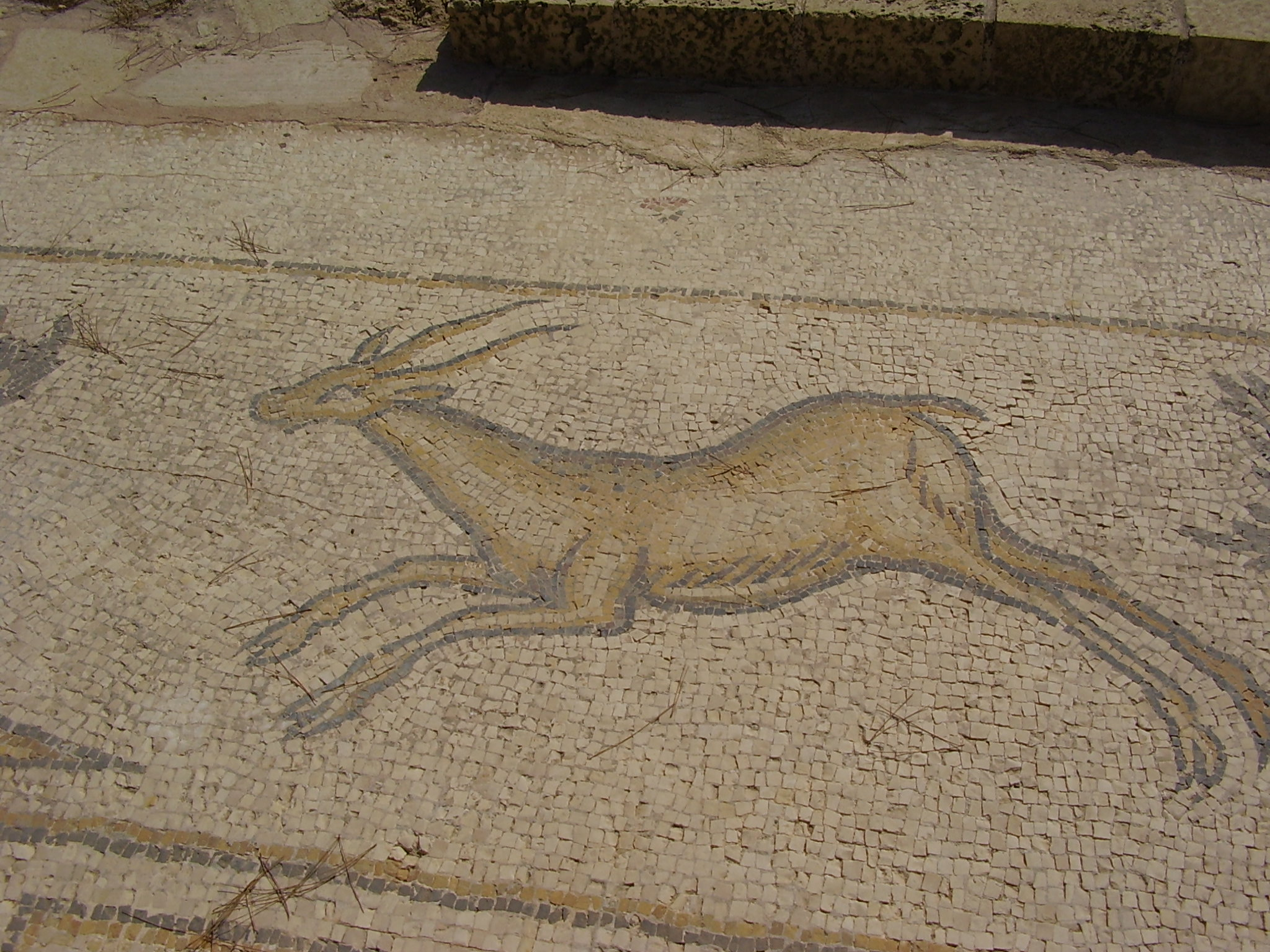
Byzantine-era mosaic of gazelle in Caesarea, Israel

Gazelle is derived from French gazelle, Old French gazel, probably via Old Spanish gacel, probably from North African pronunciation of Arabic: غزال ġazāl, Maghrebi pronunciation ġazēl. To Europe it first came to Old Spanish and Old French, and then around 1600 the word entered the English language. The Arab people traditionally hunted the gazelle. Later appreciated for its grace, however, it became a symbol most commonly associated in Arabic literature with human beauty.

== Species ==
The gazelles are divided into three genera and numerous species.

Genus	Common and binomial names	Image	Range
Gazella	Arabian gazelle G. arabica		Arabian Peninsula
Gazella	Cuvier's gazelle G. cuvieri		Algeria, Morocco and Tunisia
Gazella	Dorcas gazelle G. dorcas		North and saharan Africa, Sinai and Southern Israel
Gazella	Goitered gazelle G. subgutturosa		Azerbaijan, eastern Georgia, part of Iran, parts of Iraq and southwestern Pakistan, Afghanistan and the Gobi Desert
Gazella	Arabian sand gazelle G. marica		Syrian Desert, southeastern Turkey, and Arabian Desert
Gazella	Chinkara or Indian gazelle G. bennettii		Iran, Pakistan and India
Gazella	Mountain gazelle G. gazella		Israel, the Golan Heights, the West Bank, Dubai and Turkey
Gazella	Rhim gazelle G. leptoceros		Algeria, Chad, Egypt, Libya and Sudan
Gazella	Speke's gazelle G. spekei		Horn of Africa
Eudorcas	Mongalla gazelle E. albonotata		Floodplain and savanna of South Sudan
Eudorcas	Red-fronted gazelle E. rufifrons		The Sahel region of central Africa
Eudorcas	Red gazelle E. rufina		Mountain areas of North Africa
Eudorcas	Thomson's gazelle E. thomsonii		East Africa
Nanger	Dama gazelle N. dama		Sahara desert and the Sahel
Nanger	Grant's gazelle N. granti		Northern Tanzania to South Sudan and Ethiopia, and from the Kenyan coast to Lake Victoria
Nanger	Soemmerring's gazelle N. soemmerringii		Horn of Africa

=== Prehistoric species ===
Fossils of genus Gazella are found in Miocene, Pliocene and Pleistocene deposits of Eurasia and Africa, which occupied a broader distribution that modern members of the genus. The earliest members of the genus are known from the Middle Miocene of Africa, around 14 million years ago with members of the genus inhabiting Europe from the Late Miocene until their extinction in the region during the Early Pleistocene around 1.8 million years ago.

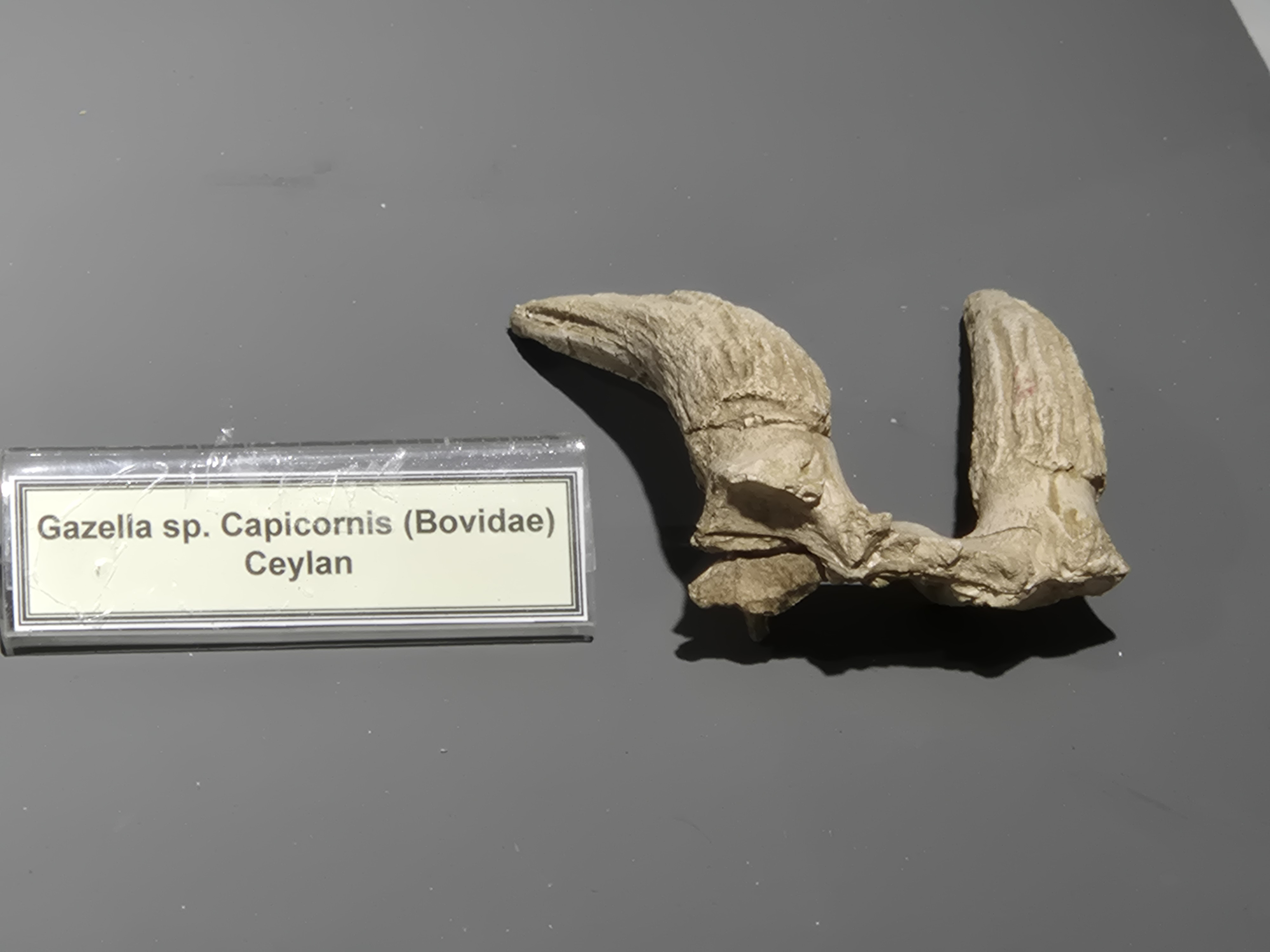
Gazella capricornis fossil

- Genus Gazella
  - Gazella borbonica - Early Pleistocene Europe
  - Gazella capricornis - Miocene Asia
  - Gazella harmonae - Pliocene of Ethiopia, unusual spiral horns
  - Gazella praethomsoni - Pliocene Africa
  - Gazella negevensis - Early Miocene Asia
  - Gazella thomasi - Thomas's gazelle
  - Gazella vanhoepeni - Pliocene Africa
- Subgenus Vetagazella
  - Gazella altidens
  - Gazella blacki - Pliocene Asia
  - Gazella deperdita - Late Miocene Europe
  - Gazella dorcadoides - Middle Miocene Asia
  - Gazella pilgrimi - Late Miocene Europe
  - Gazella gaudryi - Middle Miocene Eurasia
  - Gazella kueitensis - Pliocene Asia
  - Gazella lydekkeri - Mid to Late Miocene Asia
  - Gazella paotehensis - Middle Miocene Asia
  - Gazella paragutturosa - Pleistocene Asia
  - Gazella parasinensis - Pliocene Asia
  - Gazella praegaudryi - Pleistocene Africa
  - Gazella sinensis - Pliocene Asia
  - Gazella brianus - Pliocene Asia
- Subgenus Gazella
  - Gazella janenschi - Pliocene Africa
- Subgenus Trachelocele
  - Gazella atlantica - Pleistocene Africa
  - Gazella tingitana - Pleistocene Africa
- Subgenus Deprezia
  - Gazella psolea - Pliocene Africa

== In culture ==
=== Symbolism ===
The gazelle, like the antelope to which it is related, is the totem of many African families. Some examples include the Joof family of the Senegambia region, the Bagananoa of Botswana in Southern Africa (said to be descended from the BaHurutshe), and the Eraraka (or Erarak) clan of Uganda. As is common in many African societies, it is forbidden for the Joof or Eraraka to kill or touch the family totem.

=== Poetry ===
One of the traditional themes of Arabic love poetry involves comparing the gazelle with the beloved, and linguists theorize ghazal, the word for love poetry in Arabic, is related to the word for gazelle. The Caliph Abd al-Malik (646–705) freed a gazelle that he had captured because of her resemblance to his beloved:

O likeness of Layla, never fear!
For I am your friend, today, O wild gazelle!
Then I say, after freeing her from her fetters:
You are free for the sake of Layla, for ever!

The theme is found in the ancient Hebrew Song of Songs. (8:14)

Come away, my beloved,
and be like a gazelle
or like a young stag
on the spice-laden mountains.

== Gallery ==
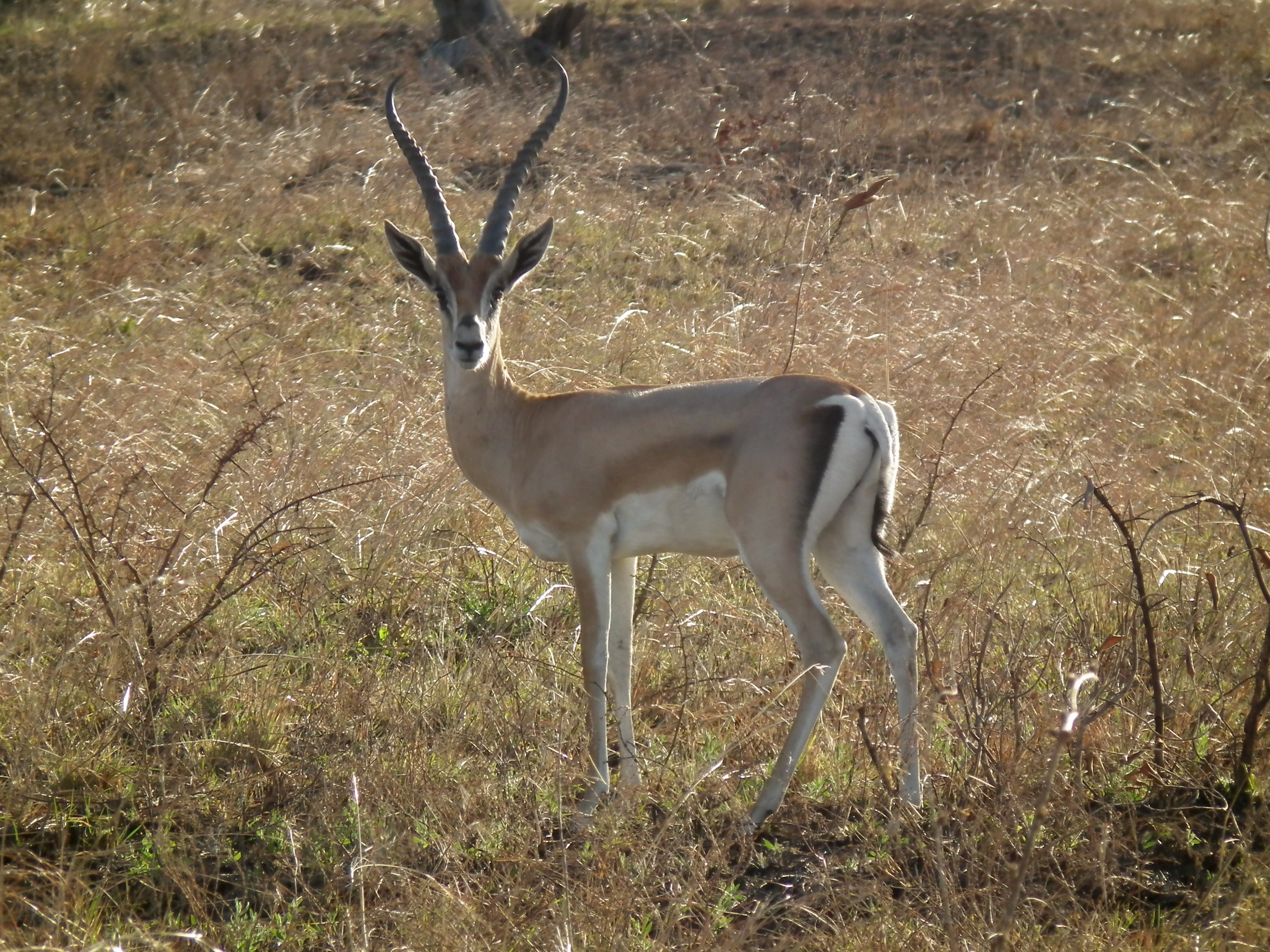
Grant's gazelle (male)

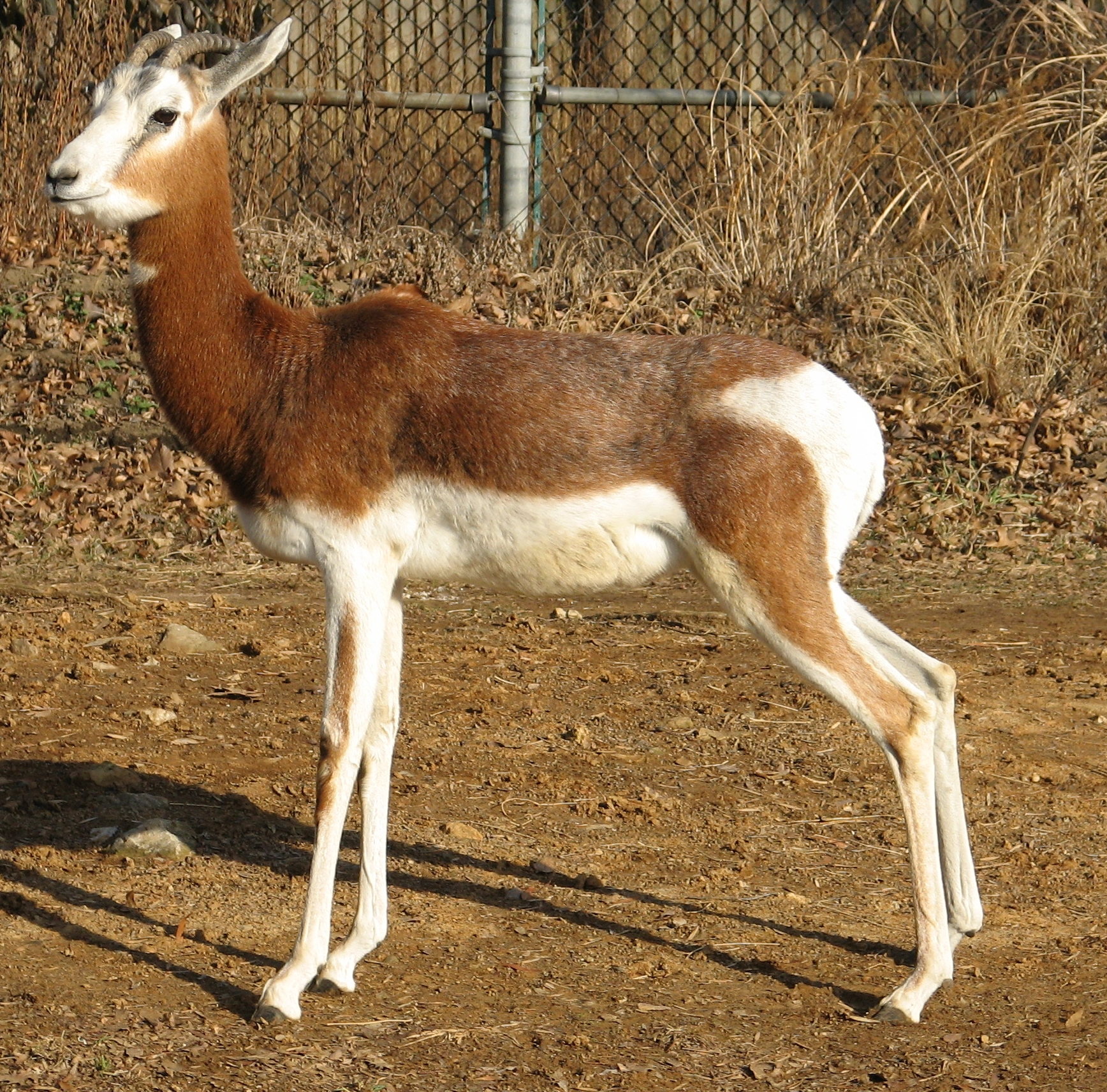
Mhorr gazelle

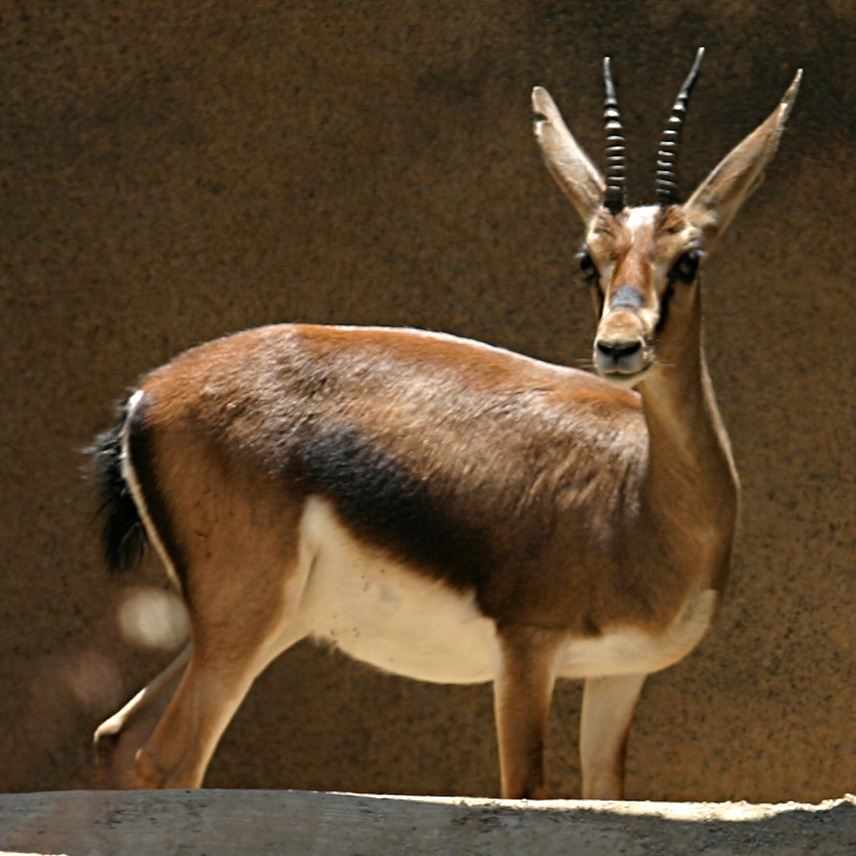
Cuvier's gazelle (female)

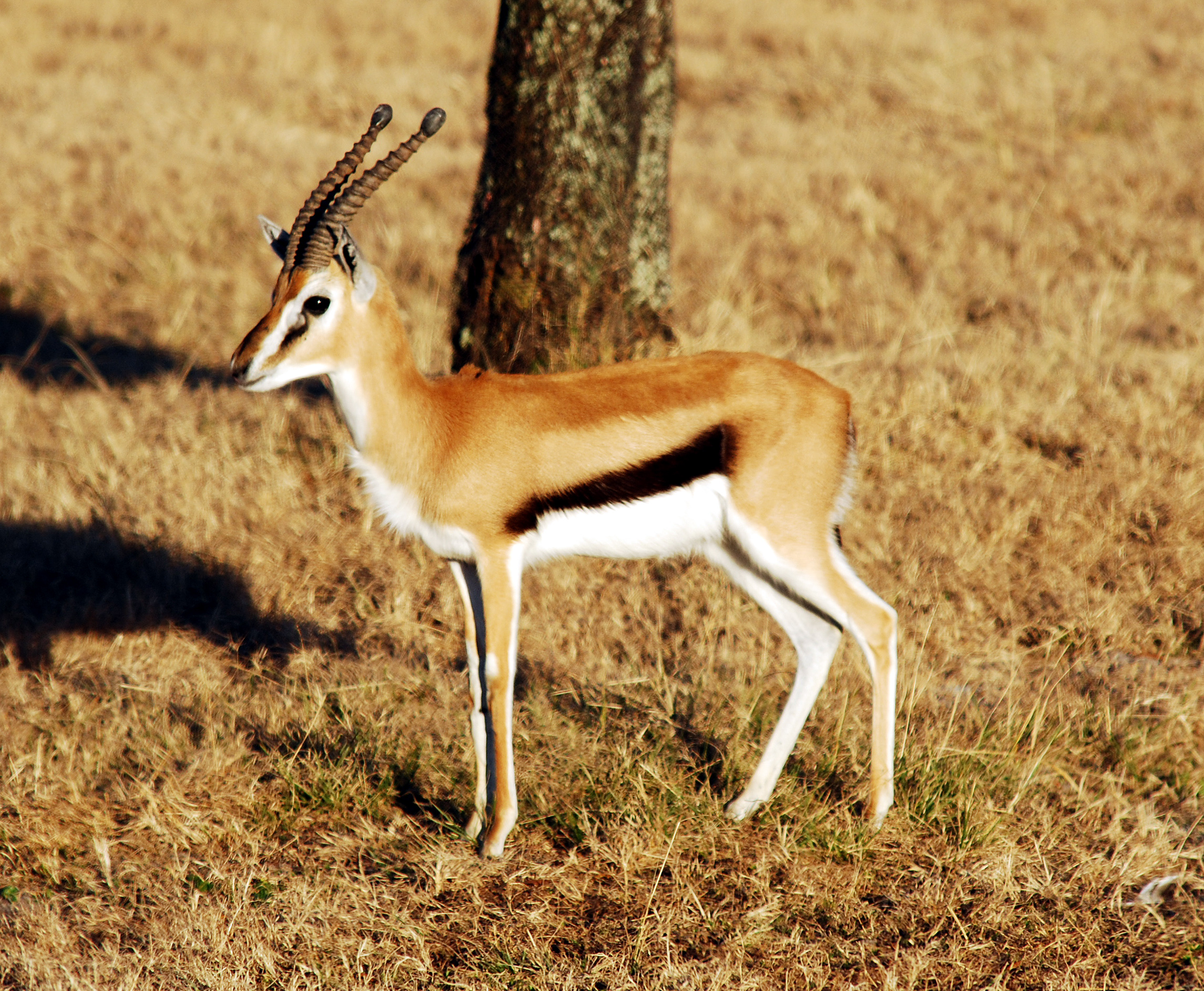
Thomson's gazelle (male)

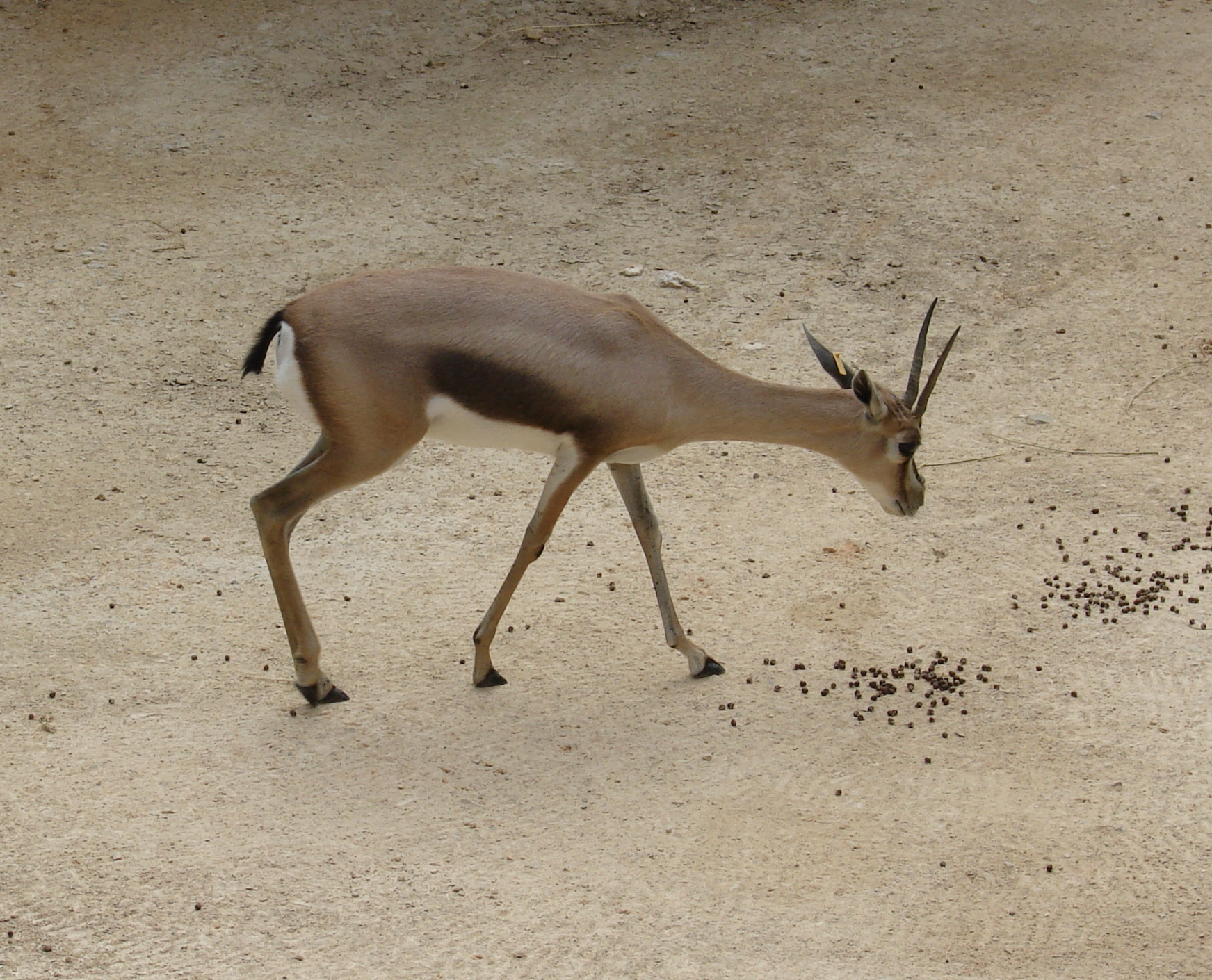
Speke's gazelle (female)

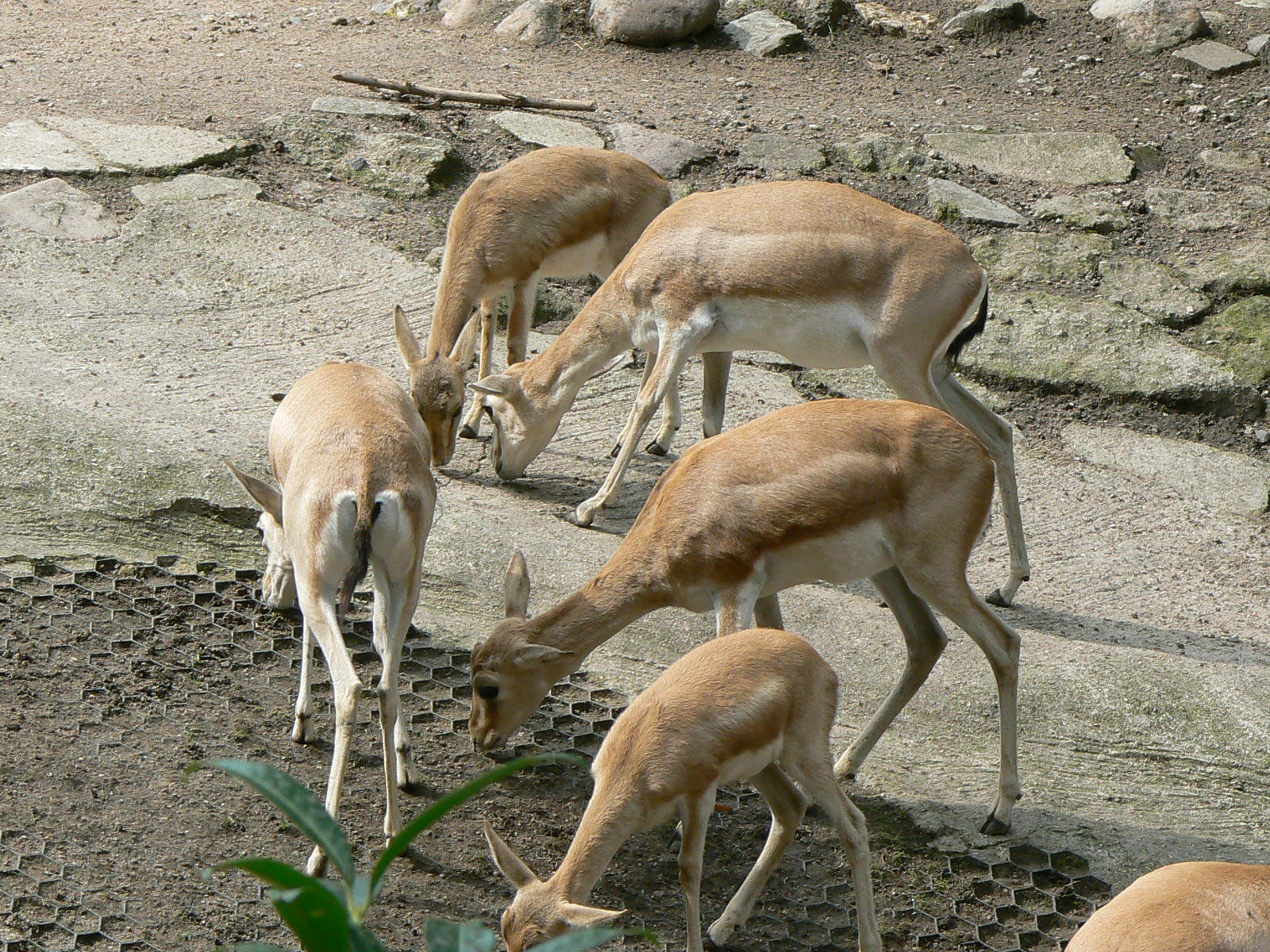
Goitered gazelle (females and young)

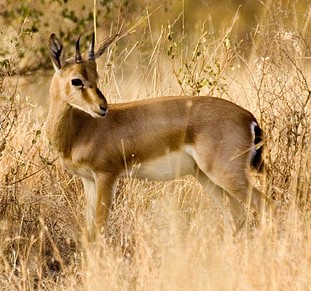
Chinkara (female)

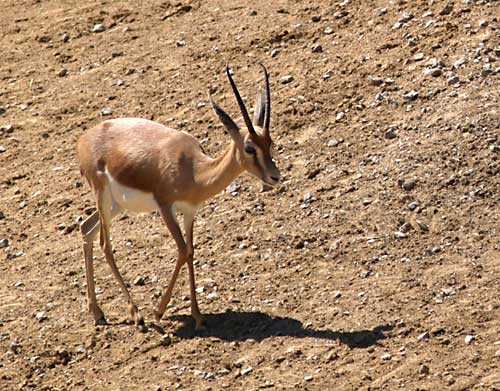
Dorcas gazelle (female)

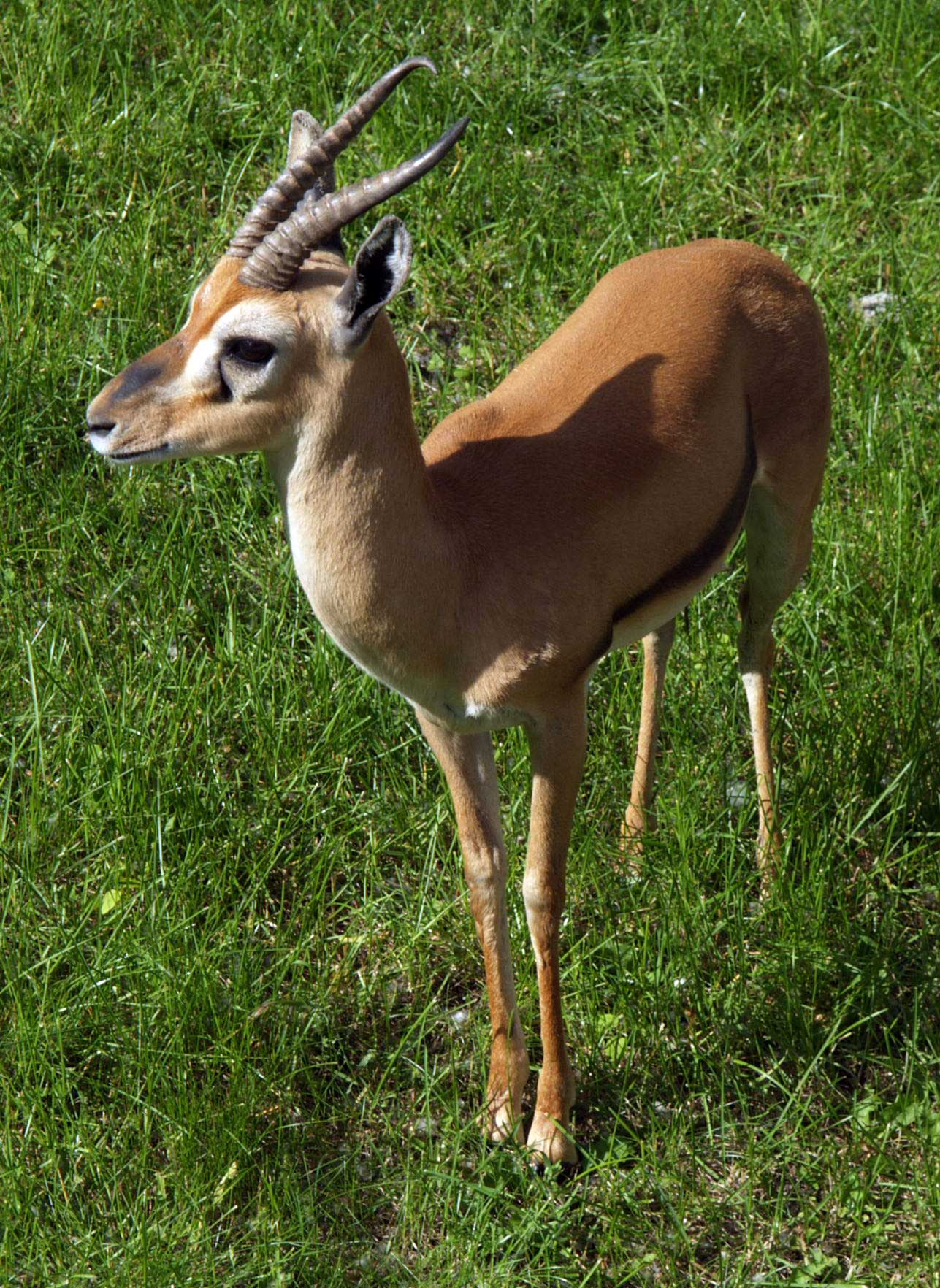
Red-fronted gazelle

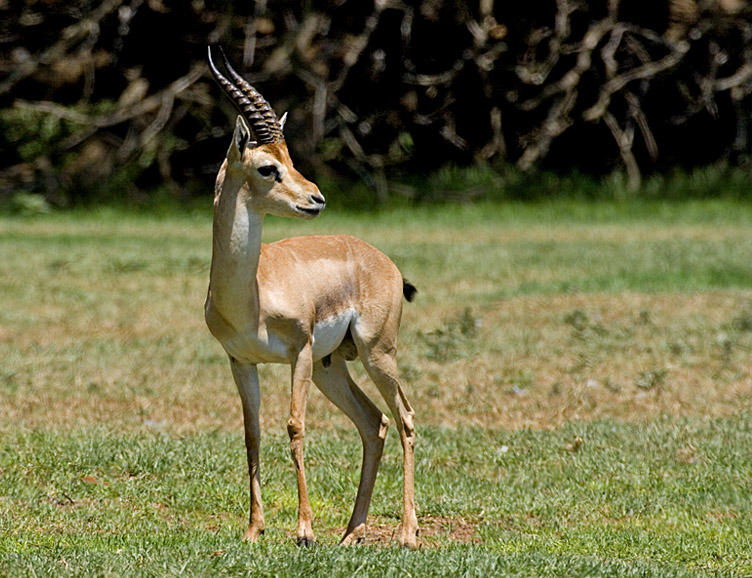
Mountain gazelle (male)

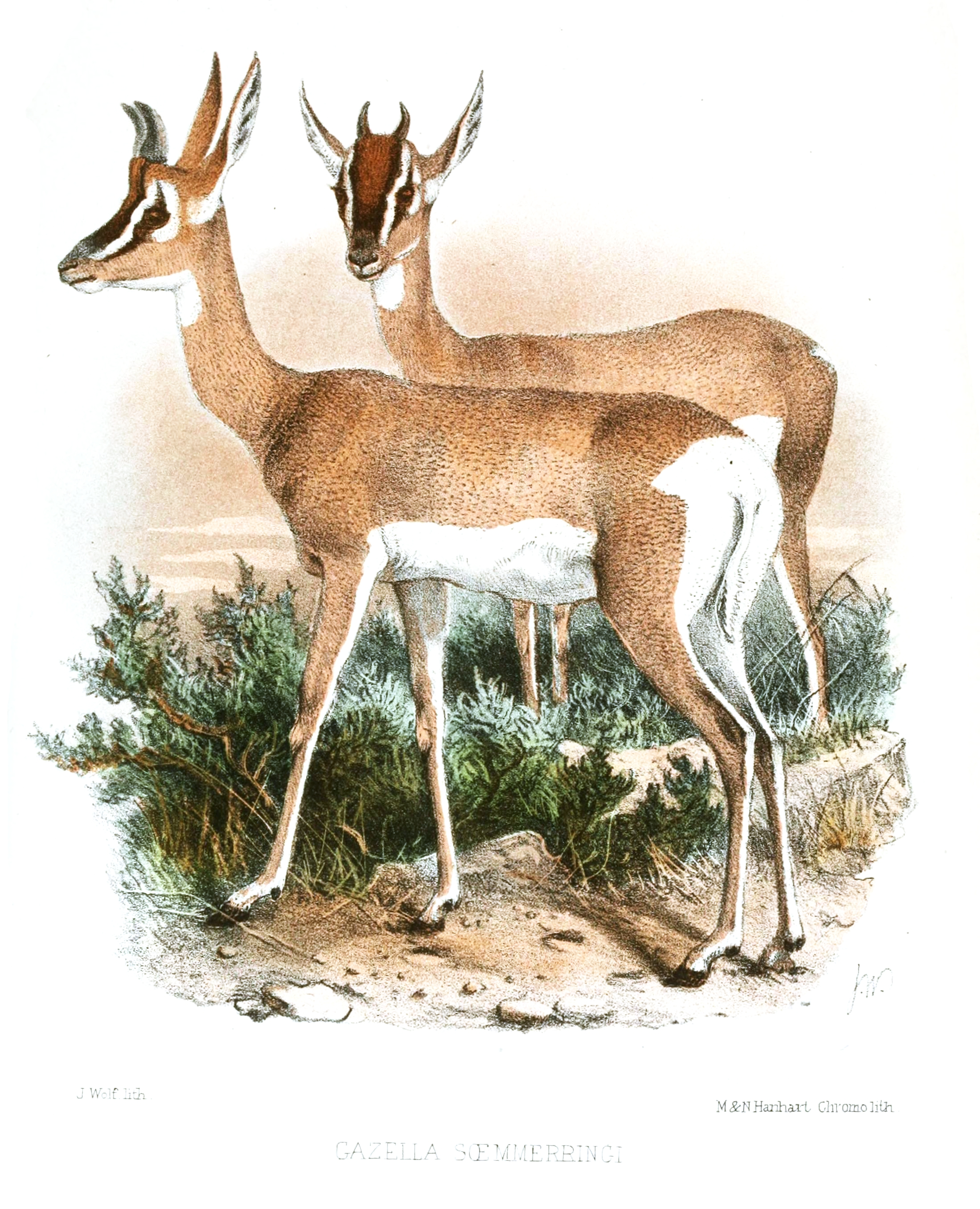
Soemmerring's gazelle (females)

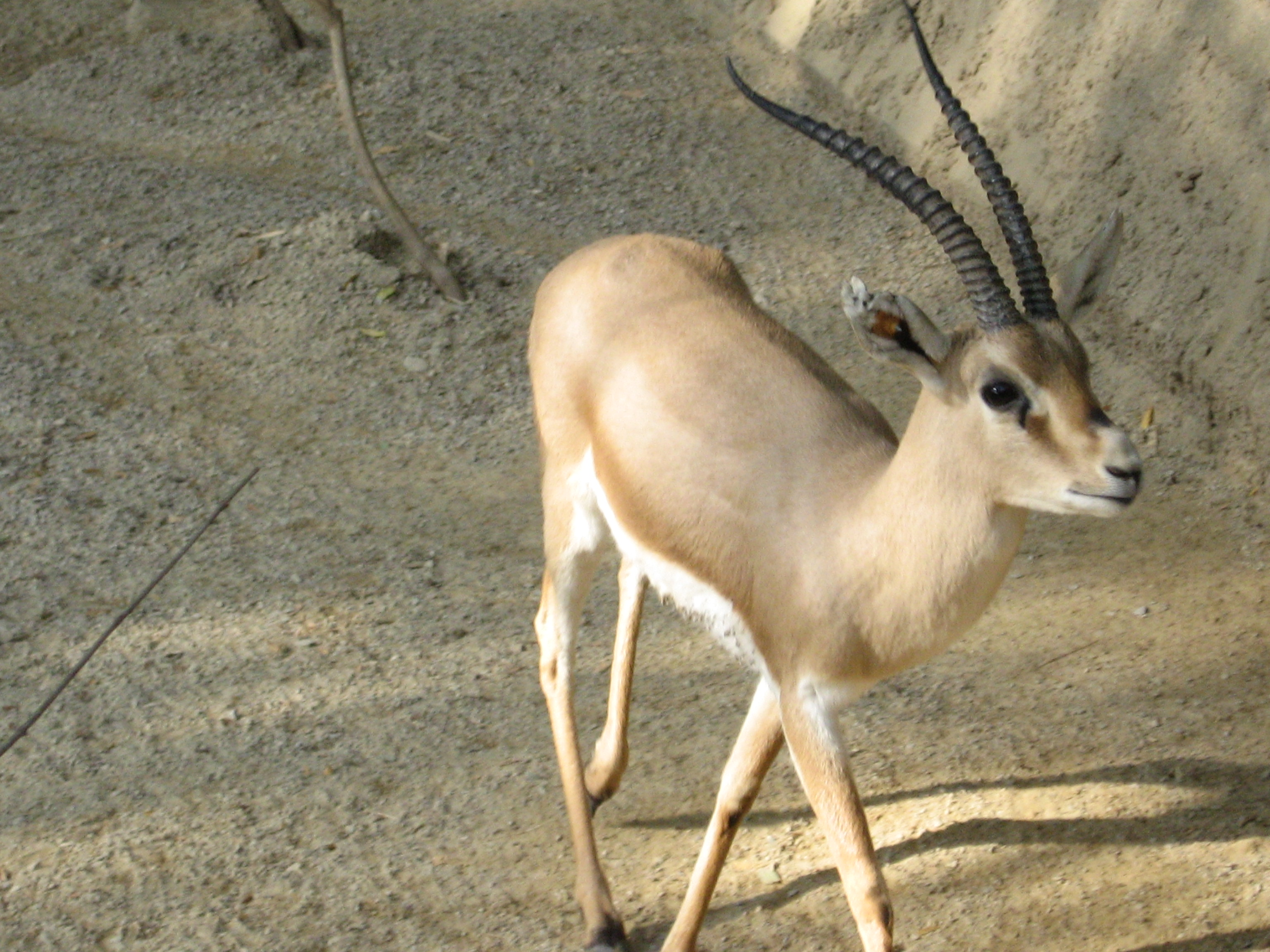
Slender-horned gazelle (male)

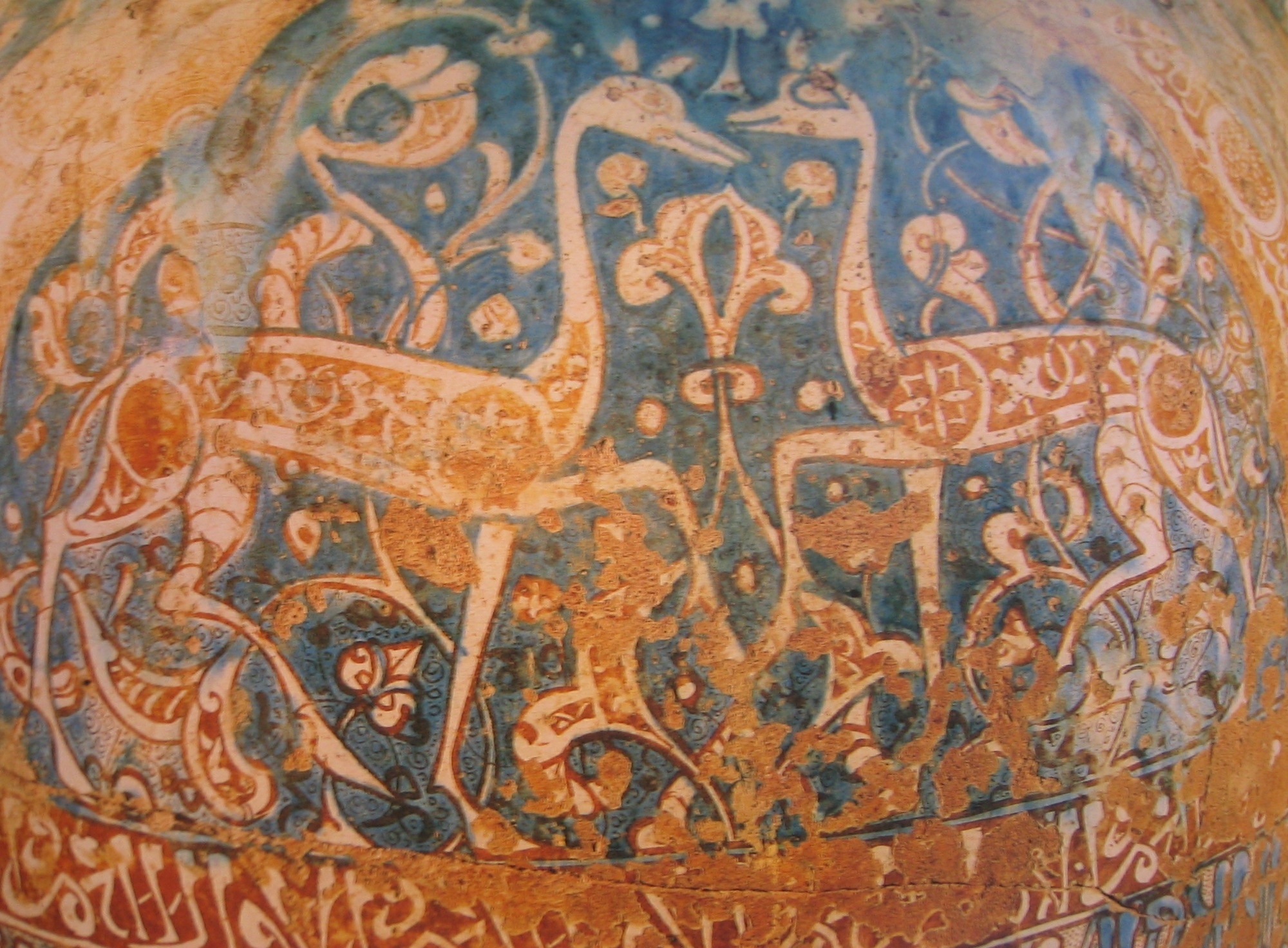
Gazelles on one of the vases made for the Alhambra palace
