= Ibex Reserve Protected Area =

Coordinates: 23.4197°N 46.5474°E

The Ibex Reserve Protected Area is located in Hotat Bani Tamim town south Riyadh at small village called Al-Helwah. It has many different kinds of desert animals but is facing the problem of extinction due to hunting and loss of water supplies. Founded in 1988 and classified in IUCN Management Category II.

"The major emphasis of this reserve is protection of the Nubian Ibex Located in the beautiful Tuwaiq escarpment in the middle of Saudi Arabia, it encompasses an area of 2,369 sq. km. The steep-walled wadis are ideal for ibex and offer habitat for other wildlife such as rock hyrax, wild cats, mongoose, and eagles. It is also a planned reintroduction site for gazelles."

== Flora ==
Approximately 265 plant species were reported in 49 families, of which the largest family is Poaceae, followed by Asteraceae, Cruciferae and Leguminosae.
