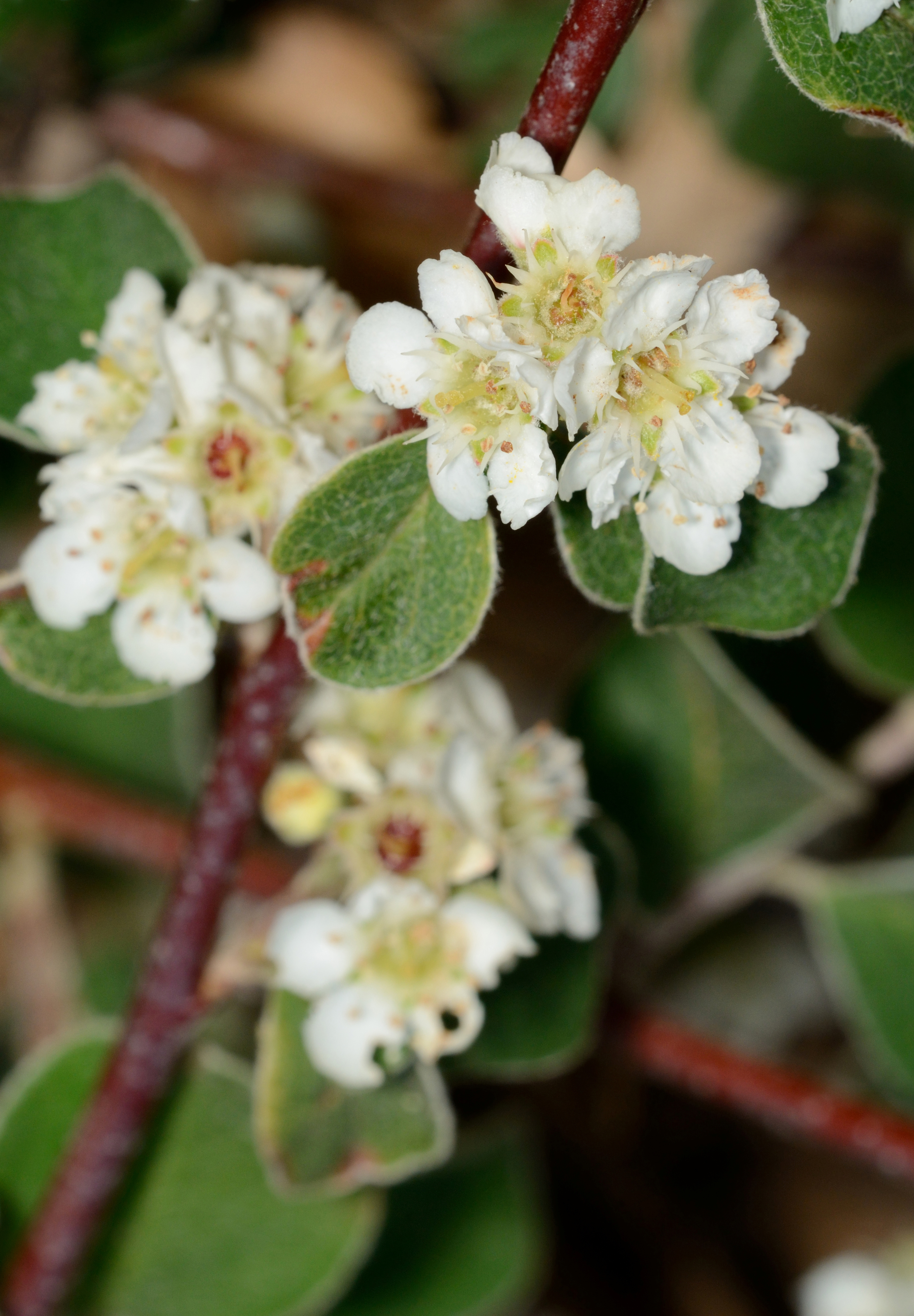

Scientific classification
- Kingdom: Plantae
- Clade: Tracheophytes
- Clade: Angiosperms
- Clade: Eudicots
- Clade: Rosids
- Order: Rosales
- Family: Rosaceae
- Genus: Cotoneaster
- Species: C. nummularius

Binomial name
- Cotoneaster nummularius Fisch. & C. A. Meyer

Synonyms
- Cotoneaster fontanesii var. nummularius (Fisch. & C. A. Mey.) Regel; Cotoneaster integerrimus var. nummularius (Fisch. & C. A. Mey.) Fiori; Cotoneaster nummularius var. typicus Koehne; Cotoneaster racemiflorus var. meyeri Zabel; Cotoneaster racemiflorus var. nummularius (Fisch. & C. A. Mey.) Dippel

= Cotoneaster nummularius =

Species of plant

Cotoneaster nummularius, the nummular or coinwort cotoneaster, is a species of flowering plant in the rose family, Rosaceae. It is a deciduous shrub native to parts of North Africa, southeastern Europe, Western and Central Asia, and the western Himalayas. It grows mainly in mountainous habitats, including rocky slopes and open woodland.

== Description ==
=== Morphology ===
Cotoneaster nummularius is a mountainous winter deciduous woody shrub typically reaching 50 cm (1.6 ft) to 100 cm (3.3 ft) in height, characterized by its much-branched structure that forms dense, rounded thickets. The branches are stiff and erect to arching, with young shoots densely tomentose and greyish, transitioning to reddish-brown to dark grey on older wood. The leaves are alternate, rounded or oval-shaped to broadly elliptic, measuring 5 mm (0.20 in) to 35 mm (1.4 in) in length and 4 mm (0.16 in) to 25 mm (0.98 in) in width, with an obtuse apex. The upper surface is dark green and fuzzy or slightly pubescent, while the lower surface is densely grey-tomentose, with a fuzzy white-silvery appearance. Petioles are short, 1 mm (0.039 in) to 2 mm (0.079 in) long, and tomentose, with small caducous stipules.

The flowers are hermaphroditic and white to pinkish-white, occurring solitary or in small corymbs of 2–5 (up 7 in some populations) per cluster, blooming from April to June. Each flower measures 7 mm (0.28 in) to 10 mm (0.39 in) in diameter, with a campanulate, densely hairy hypanthium; triangular, reflexed calyx lobes that are short and hairy; and orbicular petals that are rounded, rigid, and slightly overlapping, approximately 8 mm (0.31 in) across. Stamens are numerous, and styles number 2 to 3. The fruits are globose to oval pomes, 6 mm (0.24 in) to 10 mm (0.39 in) in length or diameter, slightly felted or velvety, initially red and ripening to bluish-black or black-violet from August to October. They contain 1 to 3 seeds and are crowned by persistent calyx lobes, with a firm mesocarp.

== Taxonomy ==
Cotoneaster nummularius is a species within the genus Cotoneaster in the rose family Rosaceae. Its accepted binomial name is Cotoneaster nummularius Fisch. & C.A. Mey., first published in 1836 by botanists Friedrich Fischer and Carl Anton Meyer in the Index Seminum of the Imperial Botanical Garden in Saint Petersburg.

== Distribution ==
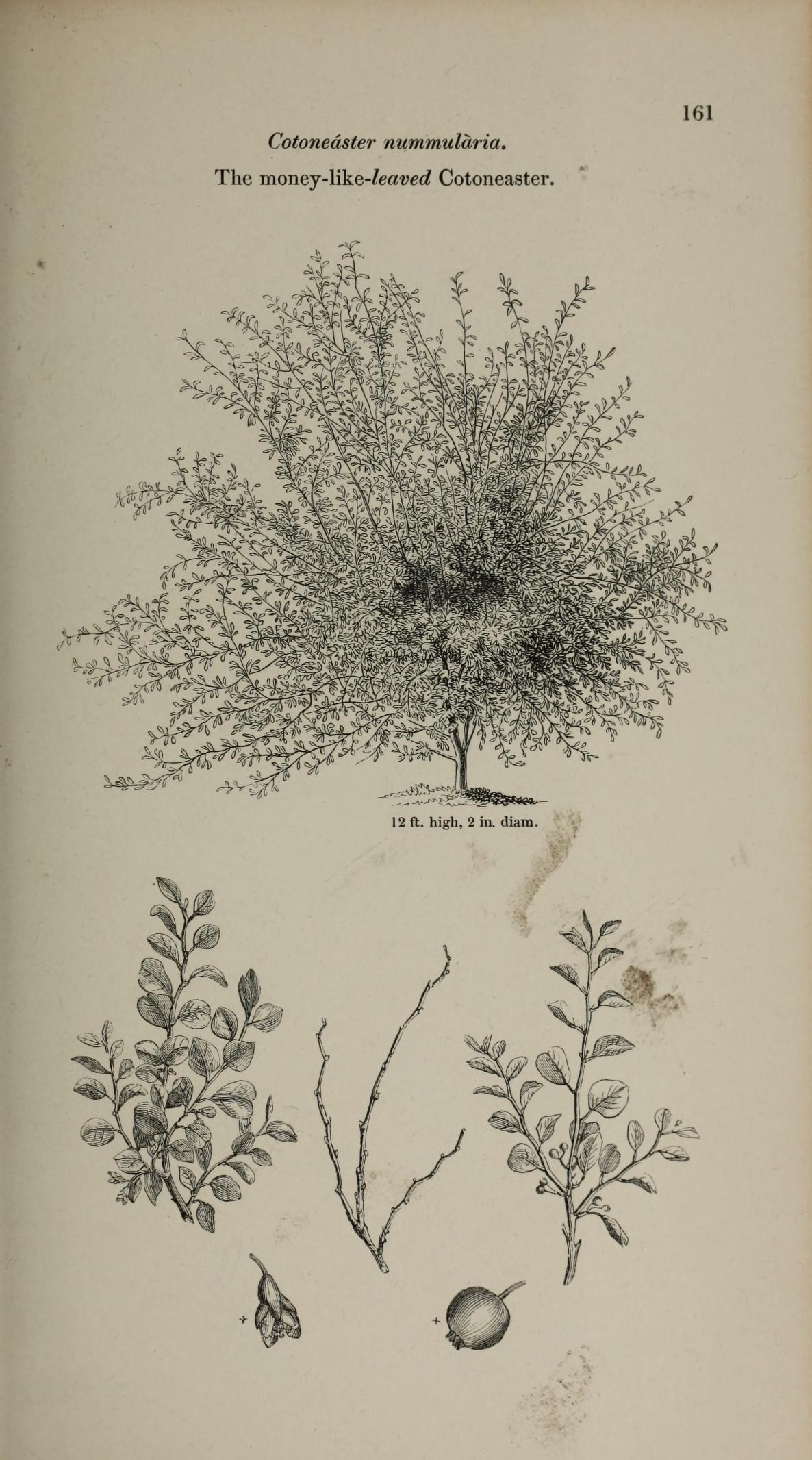
Sketch of C. nummularius from Arboretum et fruticetum britannicum

The species is found in Morocco, Greece, Crete, Lebanon, Syria, Palestine, Türkiye, Cyprus, Iraq, Yemen, Eritrea, Oman, Saudi Arabia, Caucasus, Iran, Turkmenistan, Afghanistan, Tajikistan, Uzbekistan, Azerbaijan, Armenia, Gruziya, Pakistan, Northwestern India, Xinjiang China, Inner Mongolia, Kazakhstan and Kyrgyzstan.

The species thrives in the temperate biome of mountainous regions, typically at altitudes ranging from 800 metres (2,600 ft) to 2,400 metres (7,900 ft). In Lebanon, it occurs between 1,400 metres (4,600 ft) to 2,000 metres (6,600 ft), and higher elevations up to 2,719 meters in the Alborz Mountains of Iran. It prefers a semi-arid montane climate characterized by cool, dry summers, cold winters with significant snowfall, and a dry season lasting 4–5 months, with mean annual precipitation around 687 mm mostly as snow; Ellenberg indicator values suggest a preference for cool temperatures and moderately dry conditions. The shrub favors rocky, calcareous soils in mountainous terrain, including shallow, well-drained substrates on limestone cliffs, screes, and slopes with inclinations of 5–20%, often forming dense thickets that stabilize unstable soils and prevent erosion. In Iran it occurs on brown forest soils with loam, clay loam, or sandy loam textures, higher organic matter, and nitrogen content, serving as an indicator of relatively evolved, non-saline soils in Irano-Turanian shrublands.

Cotoneaster nummularius grows in shrublands along with other Rosaceae species, such as Rosa canina and Berberis libanotica (in Lebanon), and Berberis crataegina, alongside others like Juniperus excelsa, Lonicera nummulariifolia, and Hypericum scabrum in open juniper-oak woodlands or Cedrus libani forests.

== Uses ==
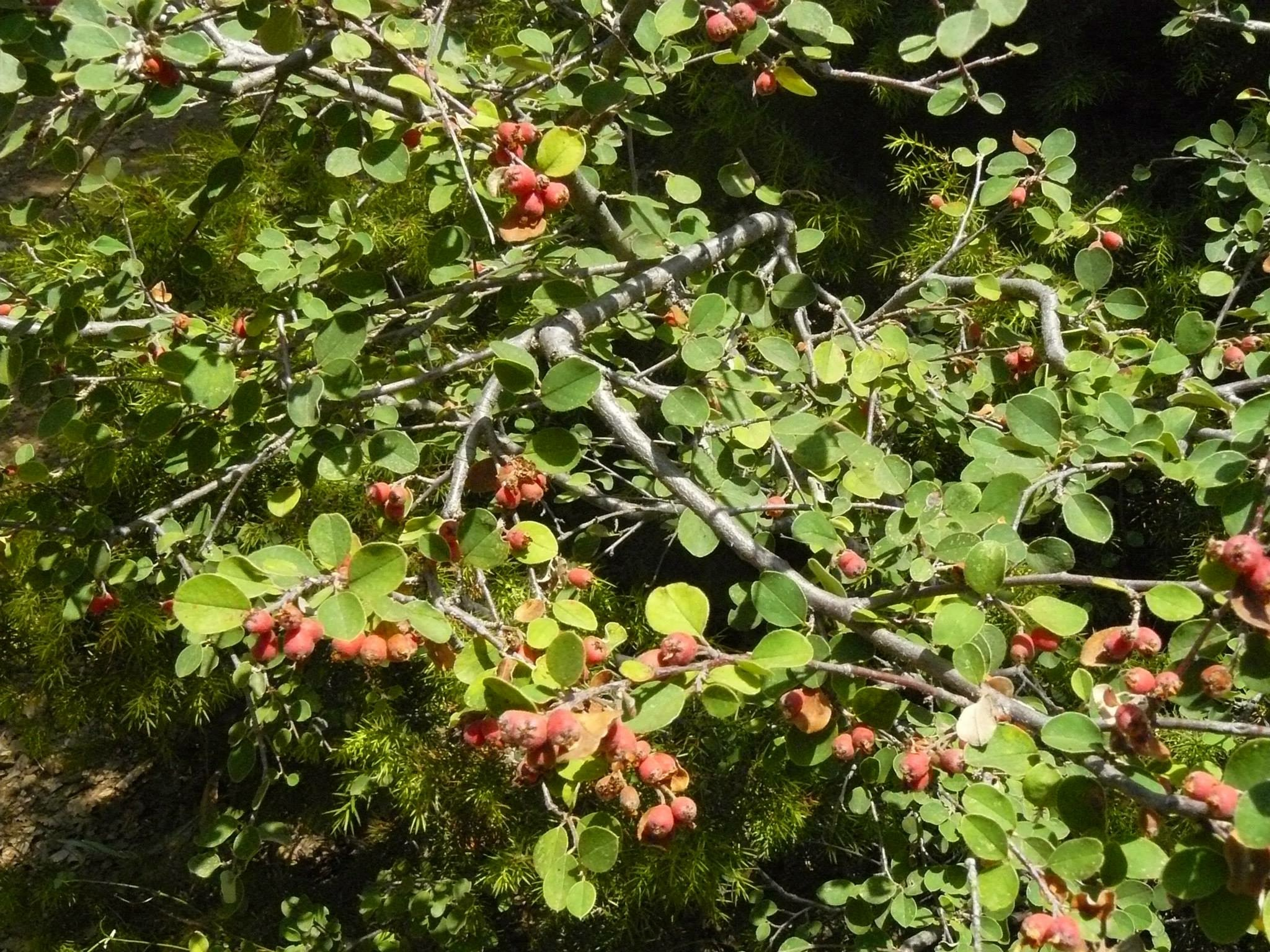
Cotoneaster nummularius pomes in Horsh Ehden Nature Reserve, Lebanon

Cotoneaster nummularius is cultivated as an ornamental shrub, widely grown in landscape architecture due to diversity of their forms, glossy green leaves, abundant flowers, and attractive pomes. Cotoneaster nummularius has a history of traditional medicinal use, particularly in Asian medicine. Modern research has also investigated its phytochemical composition and various biological activities, often in the context of the broader Cotoneaster genus.

=== Traditional Uses ===
In Lebanon, Cotoneaster nummularis is used in folk medicine; decoctions made from the fruits is taken orally as an appetite stimulant, stomachic and expectorant. The ripe fruits of C. nummularius are traditionally used in Turkey as an expectorant. In Iran, the fruiting twigs of C. nummularius have been used as an antipyretic agent for malarial fever. The roots of C. nummularius are used in the Caucasus to alleviate rheumatic pain.

=== Pharmacological Activities ===
Extracts from various Cotoneaster species, including C. nummularius, have shown significant antioxidant effects in vitro, often attributed to their polyphenol content (flavonoids, procyanidins, and caffeoylquinic acids). Several Cotoneaster species exhibit anti-inflammatory activity by inhibiting enzymes like lipoxygenase (LOX) and hyaluronidase (HYAL). The methanolic extract of C. nummularius fruit twigs has shown moderate anti-malarial activity in mice infected with Plasmodium berghei. Leaf extracts of C. nummularius have been evaluated for their ability to inhibit acetylcholinesterase and butyrylcholinesterase, enzymes relevant to Alzheimer's disease treatment. Cotoneaster manna, including that from C. nummularius, has been traditionally used and researched for its anti-jaundice activity, particularly in neonates.

=== Toxicity ===
The presence of cyanogenic glycosides, such as prunasin and amygdalin, is noted in the genus Cotoneaster, which can lead to the release of hydrogen cyanide upon enzymatic degradation. The content of these compounds varies among species and plant parts. In vitro studies on C. nummularius twigs showed no cytotoxic effect against the Madin-Darby canine kidney cell line at tested concentrations, indicating a lack of significant toxicity to healthy cells. While some Cotoneaster species show moderate cytotoxic activity against various tumor cell lines in vitro, these findings are not considered to have pharmacological relevance for anti-tumor treatment without further in vivo studies.
