= Al Houbara Protected Area =

Protected area in Abu Dhabi

- محية الحبارى الطبيعية
- IUCN category IV (habitat/species management area)
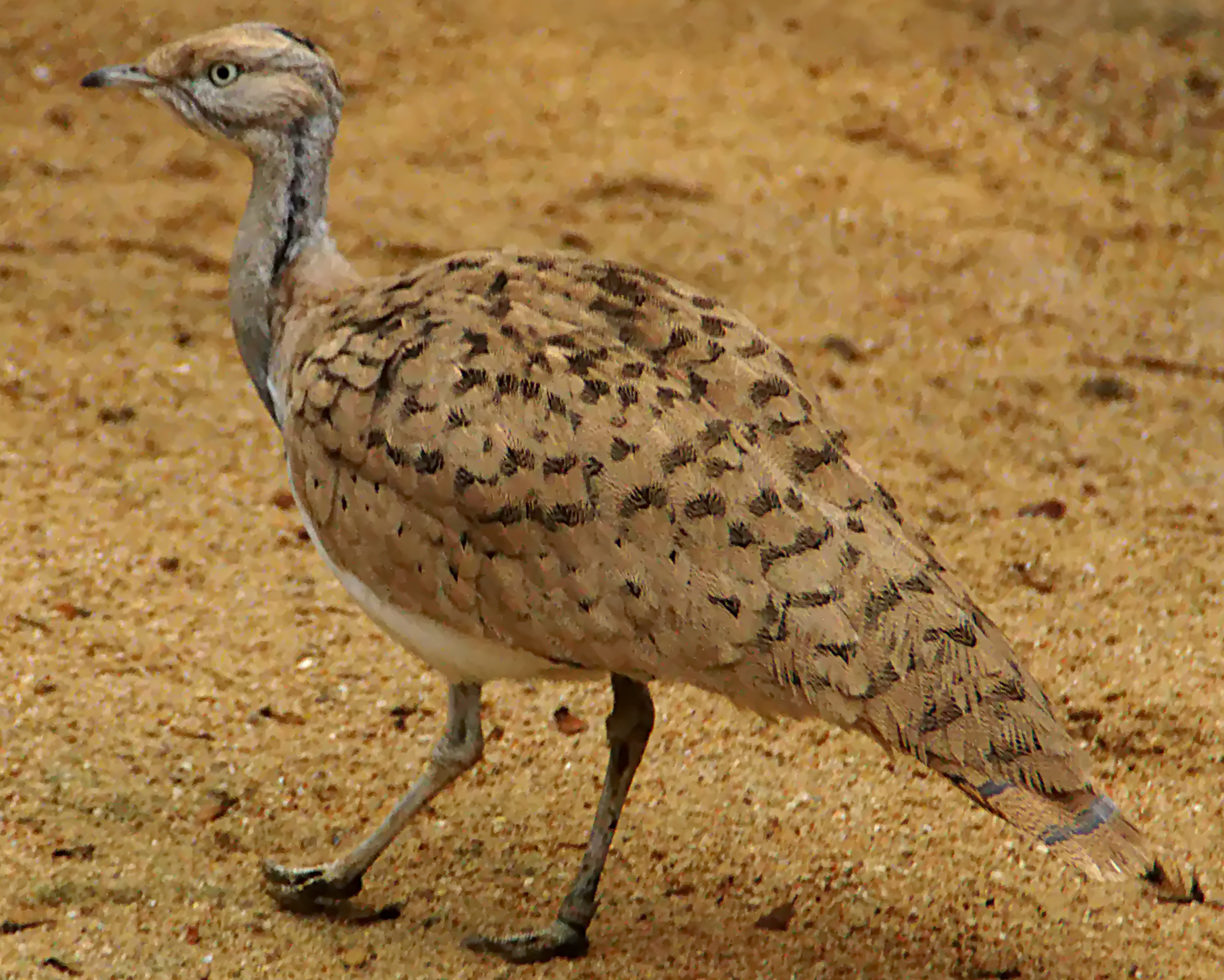
- Houbara bustard

- Location within United Arab Emirates
- Location: Emirate of Abu Dhabi
- Coordinates: 23.8930°N 53.1635°E
- Area: 774 km^{2} (299 sq mi)
- Governing body: Environment Agency Abu Dhabi

Al Houbara Protected Area is a natural reserve in the United Arab Emirates, located in the emirate of Abu Dhabi. It is named after the large ground bird, houbara bustard, which belongs in the Persian Gulf region. This reserve consists of abundant plantations and coastal plains on well-drained sandy and gravelly terrain.

== Overview ==
It is one of the most important natural reserves, based mainly on the settlement of houbara birds, as it hosts the largest programs for the resettlement of those birds in the United Arab Emirates. It is also the only reserve in which sand cats were spotted again after a long absence, according to the reserve's management by the Environment Agency in Abu Dhabi. The reserve extends over an area of 774 km square.

== Arabian oryx ==
In coordination with the Municipality of Al Dhafra Region and under the directives of Sheikh Hamdan bin Zayed Al Nahyan, "the representative of the ruler in the Al Dhafra region and Chairman of the Board of Directors of the Environment Authority in Abu Dhabi", the Environment Agency issued a new group of Arabian oryx in the Houbara Reserve, and this group is the first among 100 Arabian oryx, as Hamdan bin Zayed Al Nahyan confirmed that the reintroduction of the Arabian oryx led to a change in its status in 2011 in the IUCN Red List, from "Endangered" to "Vulnerable".

== See also ==
- Al Marmoom Desert Conservation Reserve
- Dubai Desert Conservation Reserve
- Khor Kalba Nature Reserve
