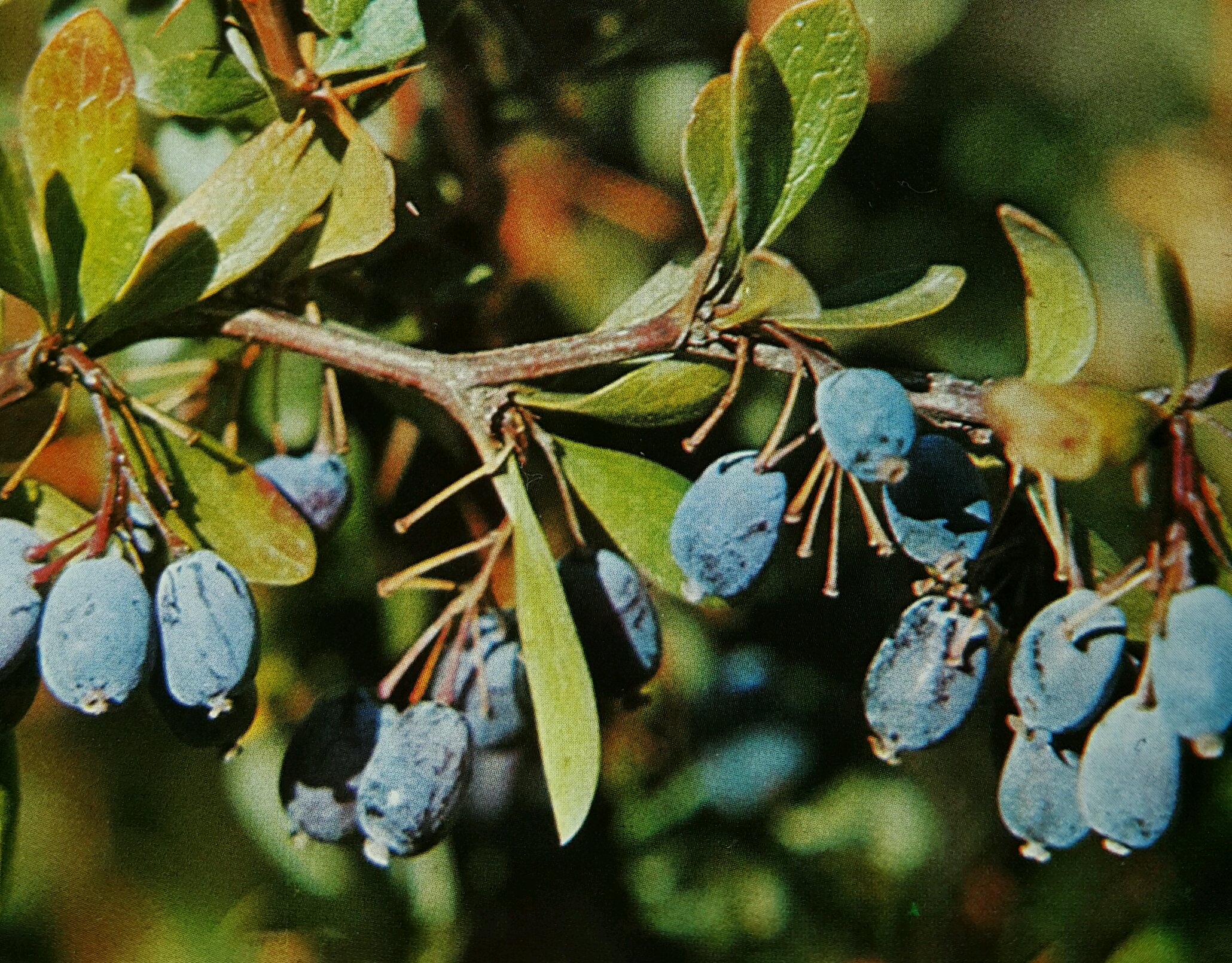

Conservation status
- Least Concern (IUCN 3.1)

Scientific classification
- Kingdom: Plantae
- Clade: Tracheophytes
- Clade: Angiosperms
- Clade: Eudicots
- Order: Ranunculales
- Family: Berberidaceae
- Genus: Berberis
- Species: B. libanotica

Binomial name
- Berberis libanotica Ehrenb. ex C.K.Schneid. (1905)

= Berberis libanotica =

Species of shrub

Berberis libanotica is a species of plant in the family Berberidaceae. It is a spiny shrub native to Lebanon and Syria.

== Taxonomy ==
It was first published by Austrian botanist Camillo Karl Schneider (1876–1951) in Ill. Handb. Laubholzk. vol.1 on page 310 in 1905, based on an earlier description by Ehrenb. (1795-1876). It was originally found Lebanon.

Berberis libanotica is considered by C. Schneider and most botanists after him as a distinct species from B. cretica L. It is however very close to it and differs only by the absence of stomata on the upper side of the leaves, and is rarely synonymized under Berberis cretica.

== Uses ==
It is a medicinal plant well known to the Lebanese, who make use of the solution obtained by maceration of its roots in tepid water for treating certain liver and gall bladder diseases. The investigation of its active agents was the topic of a doctorate dissertation in pharmacy submitted by J. Ades in 1948 at the French Faculty of Medicine, Beirut.

== Description ==
It is a shrubby tree reaching up to 1.50 metres (4 ft 11 in). Branches are blackish red, provided with strong yellow spines, close to each other, often 3-parted. Leaves are glabrous, sessile, 15–25 millimetres (0.59–0.98 in) long over 5–7 millimetres (0.20–0.28 in) wide, strongly innerved.

It flowers between May and June. Inflorescence is in racemes smaller than leaves. Perianth is made of 6 petal-like yellow sepals, 4–5 millimetres (0.16–0.20 in) in diameter. Stamens; anthers oval. Ovary is topped by a thick sessile stigma. Fruit is an ovate blackish berry.

== Distribution and habitat ==
It is native to the Lebanon and Anti-Lebanon mountains of Lebanon and adjacent Syria, including the eastern slope of Hermon. It grows at elevations of 1,600 and 2,200 m (5,200 and 7,200 ft) above sea level.

The species is widespread in the mountains. Its population is declining from habitat loss caused by urbanization, road construction, and ski resorts on the western slope of the Lebanon Mountains, and by quarrying and overgrazing on eastern slopes.
