= Cyperus conglomeratus =

Scientific classification
- Kingdom: Plantae
- Clade: Tracheophytes
- Clade: Angiosperms
- Clade: Monocots
- Clade: Commelinids
- Order: Poales
- Family: Cyperaceae
- Genus: Cyperus
- Species: C. conglomeratus

Binomial name
- Cyperus conglomeratus Rottb.

Species of sedge

Cyperus conglomeratus is a species of sedge that is native to northern Africa, the Middle East and parts of western Asia.

The species was first formally described by the botanist Christen Friis Rottbøll in 1773.

== See also ==
- List of Cyperus species
