= Gazella tingitana =

Gazella tingitana Temporal range: Mid - Late Pleistocene

Scientific classification
- Domain: Eukaryota
- Kingdom: Animalia
- Phylum: Chordata
- Class: Mammalia
- Order: Artiodactyla
- Family: Bovidae
- Subfamily: Antilopinae
- Tribe: Antilopini
- Genus: Gazella
- Species: †G. tingitana

Binomial name
- †Gazella tingitana (Arambourg, 1957)

Extinct species of bovid

Gazella tingitana is an extinct species of gazelle from the Late Pleistocene of Morocco.

Arambourg described G. tingitana in 1957 from material at Mugharet el 'Aliya in Morocco, now dated to between 85 and 37 ka (85,000 - 37,000 BP). It was subsequently documented from Mid-to-Late Pleistocene (190,000 - 90 ka) deposits at Jebel Irhoud. Like most living gazelles, it may have been a mixed-feeder.
