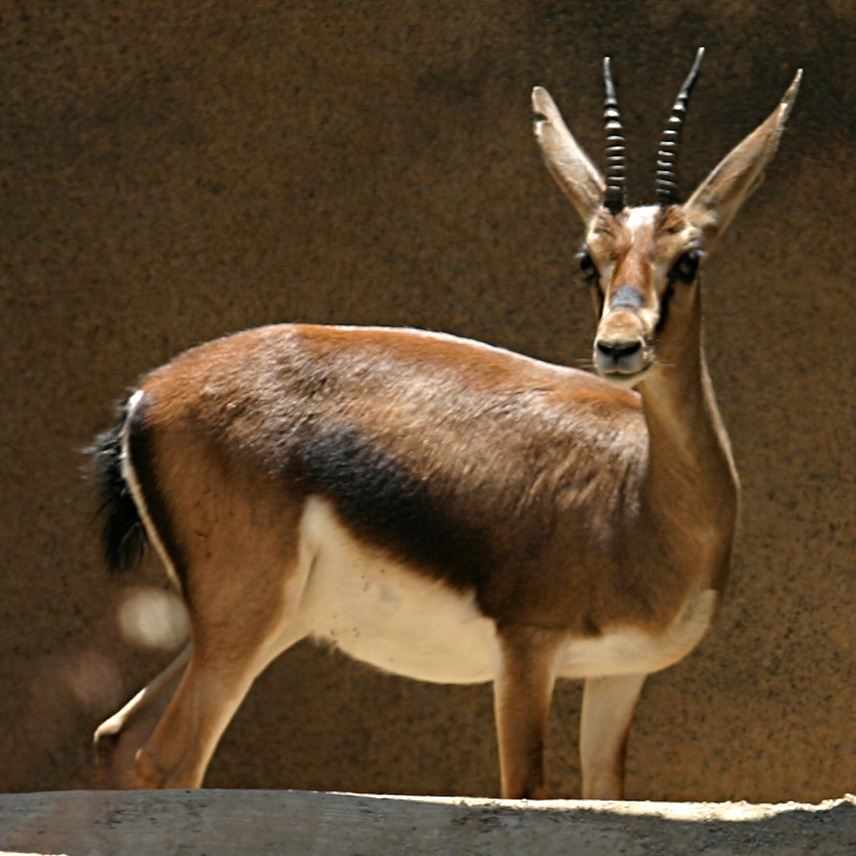
- At the San Diego Zoo

Conservation status
- Vulnerable (IUCN 3.1)
- CITES Appendix I

Scientific classification
- Kingdom: Animalia
- Phylum: Chordata
- Class: Mammalia
- Infraclass: Placentalia
- Order: Artiodactyla
- Family: Bovidae
- Subfamily: Antilopinae
- Genus: Gazella
- Species: G. cuvieri

Binomial name
- Gazella cuvieri (Ogilby, 1841)

= Cuvier's gazelle =

Species of mammal

Cuvier's gazelle (Gazella cuvieri) is a species of gazelle native to Algeria, Morocco, Western Sahara, and Tunisia. It is also known as the edmi. It is one of the darkest gazelle species, possibly an adaptation to its partial woodland habitat. It is sometimes placed into the genus Trachelocele together with the goitered gazelles and the rhim gazelles.

== Characteristics ==
Cuvier's gazelle is one of the darkest and smallest of the gazelle species, standing 60–69 cm (1.97–2.26 ft) tall, with an average weight of 35 kg (77 lb). It is characterized by a distinctive wide, dark band that runs along the sides of the animal, which separates the brown dorsal parts from the white ventral parts. They possess long, slender ears. While both sexes have horns between 10 and 15 cm (3.9 and 5.9 in) long, the male's horns are more ribbed and have greater mass.

The purpose of the dark bands that run parallel along the side of the animal is to aid in countershading, having ventral body pelage that is more lightly colored that the dorsal surface to counteract the effect of the body's self-shadowing.

== Status ==
In the past, the reason for decline of the gazelle was overhunting for skins, meat, and trophies. In the 1930s, it was already considered one of the rarest gazelles, but it was not listed as endangered until the 1960s. Though it is now unlawful to hunt the animal, they still suffer from habitat stress due to local farmers destroying habitat for pastureland and competition from domestic sheep and goats.

Once thought to be extinct in the wild, the gazelle's population is now thought to be less than 2000, occupying small pockets of the Atlas Mountains. Many of the animals can be found on protected land in Tunisia, but this is not the case in Morocco and Algeria, where many of the animals are still being outcompeted for food from livestock. One of the most important refuges is Djebel Chambi National Park, which holds the largest population in Tunisia. A reintroduction program was conducted in the Tunisian Jebel Serj National Park: In 2019, 30 gazelles were released, all born in Tunisia over the course of three breeding seasons, out of a carefully considered Spanish stock of gazelles bred in captivity in Almeria and the Canari Island. The reintroduced population multiplied and is progressively increasing.

In Algeria the 200,000 ha Saharan Atlas National Park is a refuge for about a hundred Cuvier's gazelles. The Belezma National Park has about 20, but this figure is uncertain and a reintroduction has been planned.

== Habitat ==
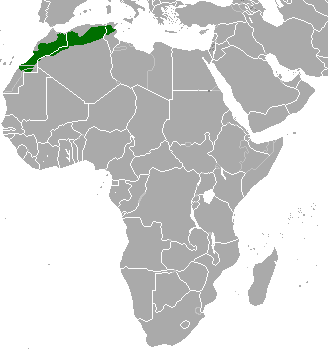
Range map

Cuvier's gazelle inhabits the Atlas Mountains in Northwestern Africa. It is found in many different types of landscapes. The preference is for sandy or stony hills and plateaus. They also occupy areas of regenerating forests and lush pine forests. During the early morning and late evening they come out of the mountains to graze in the low grasslands. Then in the afternoon, they will travel back up the mountain into the forests and find a cool place to spend the day.

== Behavior ==
As herbivorous ruminants, the diet of Cuvier's gazelle consists entirely of leaves, grasses, and other vegetation. They will consume large amounts of greenery and find a cool place during the day to finish chewing their cuds, remnant wads of food that return from the stomach (eructation) to be chewed a second time for further digestion.

Their main defense is their alertness. When sensing something suspicious, they will set off an alert signal by flicking their tails and performing a strong gait, of jumping into the air and having all four hooves land on the ground at the same time. Along with their alertness, they are also one of the fastest gazelles, reaching and sustaining top speeds over 50 mph.

Cuvier's gazelle tend to live in social groups of three or four during mating season, but usually not more than eight. Groups tend to contain one male and up to three females each with up to two offspring. During the mating season, the dominant males will force the younger males out of the social group; they will form bachelor groups. Then, the females will leave the group to give birth. After giving birth, females will join bachelor groups and live the rest of mating season with them.

== Reproduction ==
With the gestation period lasting around 160 days, the gazelles tend to breed in the winter and give birth in the early spring. Before giving birth, the mother will separate herself from the herd to give birth, and then hide the newborn in the thick underbrush outside the herd, returning occasionally to nurse it. This occurs for the first month until the newborn begins to eat vegetation, but still relying on nourishment from its mother.

Cuvier's gazelle is one of the few gazelle species to frequently give birth to twins (40.5%), with singlets weighing an average of 2.99 kg (6.59 lb) and twins weighing an average of 2.85 kg (6.28 lb). Ten days after giving birth, the females may breed again, giving birth to two sets of offspring per year. Newborn females can become fertile as early as 27 weeks and can give birth as soon as 70 weeks of age.
