= Geography of Somalia =

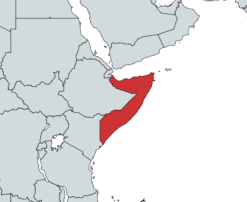
- Region: Horn of Africa
- Coordinates: 5.5941182°N 47.2192383°E
- Area: Ranked 43rd
  - Total: 637,657 km^{2} (246,201 sq mi)
- Coastline: 3,333 km (2,071 mi)
- Borders: Total land borders: Djibouti: 60 km (37 mi); 2,340 km (1,450 mi); Ethiopia: 1,600 km (990 mi); Kenya: 682 km (424 mi)
- Highest point: Shimbiris; 2,460 m (8,070.9 ft)
- Lowest point: Indian Ocean; 0 m (0.0 ft)
- Longest river: Shebelle River; 1,130 km (702.1 mi)
- Exclusive economic zone: 637,657 km^{2} (246,201 sq mi)

Somalia map of Köppen climate classification.

Somalia is a country located in the Horn of Africa which officially consists of the intra-46th meridian east territory, the seven federal member states, namely Galmudug, Hirshabelle, Jubaland, South West, Puntland, and the municipality of Benadir. It is bordered by Ethiopia to the west, the Gulf of Aden to the north, the Somali Sea and Guardafui Channel to the east, and Kenya to the southwest. With a land area of 637,657 square kilometers, Somalia's terrain consists mainly of plateaus, plains and highlands. Its coastline is more than 3,333 kilometers in length, the longest of mainland Africa. It has been described as being roughly shaped "like a tilted number seven".

In the far north, the rugged east–west ranges of the Ogo Mountains lie at varying distances from the Gulf of Aden coast. Hot conditions prevail year-round, along with periodic monsoon winds and irregular rainfall. Geology suggests the presence of valuable mineral deposits.

Somalia is separated from Seychelles by the Somali Sea and is separated from Socotra by the Guardafui Channel.

== Climate ==
Due to Somalia's proximity to the equator, there is not much seasonal variation in its climate. However, there are some very unpredictable rainfalls that occur sometimes. Hot conditions prevail year-round along with monsoon (periodic seasonal reversing wind accompanied by corresponding changes in precipitation) winds and irregular rainfall. Mean daily maximum temperatures range from 30 to 40 °C (86 to 104 °F), except at higher elevations and along the eastern seaboard, where the effects of a cold offshore current can be felt. In Mogadishu, for instance, average afternoon highs range from 28 to 32 °C (82 to 90 °F) in April. Some of the highest mean annual temperatures in the world have been recorded in the country; Berbera on the northwestern coast has an afternoon high that averages more than 38 °C (100 °F) from June through September. Nationally, mean daily minimums usually vary from about 15 to 30 °C (59 to 86 °F). The greatest range in climate occurs in northern Somalia, where temperatures sometimes surpass 45 °C (113 °F) in July on the littoral plains and drop below the freezing point during December in the highlands. In this region, relative humidity ranges from about 40 percent in the mid-afternoon to 85 percent at night, changing somewhat according to the season.

Unlike the climates of most other countries at this latitude, conditions in Somalia range from arid desert in the northeastern and central regions to semiarid steppe in the south and northwest. In the south, in the east Africa coastal forest, there are regions in which there is a tropical savanna climate. In the Cal Madow region of Somalia, there is cold steppe climate. In the northeast, annual rainfall is less than 4 inches (100 mm); in the central plateaus, it is about 8 to 12 inches (200 to 300 mm). The northwestern and southwestern parts of the nation, however, receive considerably more rain, with an average of 20 to 24 inches (510 to 610 mm) falling per year. Although the coastal regions are hot and humid throughout the year, the hinterland is typically dry and hot. The Cal Madow and the Lag Badana national park are humid areas.

Most of the country receives less than 500 millimeters (19.7 in) of rain annually, and a large area encompassing the northeast and much of northern Somalia receives as little as 50 to 150 millimeters (1.97 to 5.91 in). Certain higher areas in the north, however, record more than 500 millimeters (19.7 in) a year, as do some coastal sites. The southwest receives 330 to 500 millimeters (13.0 to 19.7 in). Generally, rainfall takes the form of showers or localized torrential rains and is extremely variable. Mean daily maximum temperatures throughout the country range from 30 to 40 °C (86 to 104 °F), except at higher elevations and along the Somali Sea coast. Mean daily minimum temperatures vary from 20 °C (68 °F) to more than 30 °C (86 °F). Northern Somalia experiences the greatest temperature extremes, with readings ranging from below freezing in the highlands in December to more than 45 °C (113 °F) in July in the coastal plain skirting the Gulf of Aden. The north's relative humidity ranges from about 40 percent in midafternoon to 85 percent at night, varying somewhat with the season. During the colder months, December to February, visibility at higher elevations is often restricted by fog. Temperatures in the south are less extreme, ranging from about 20 to 40 °C (68 to 104 °F). The hottest months are February through April. Coastal readings are usually five to ten degrees cooler than those inland. The coastal zone's relative humidity usually remains about 70 percent even during the dry seasons.

There are four main seasons around which pastoral and agricultural life revolve, and these are dictated by shifts in the wind patterns. From December to March is the Jilal, the harshest dry season of the year. The main rainy season, referred to as the Gu, lasts from April to June. This period is characterized by the southwest monsoons, which rejuvenate the pasture land, especially the central plateau, and briefly transform the desert into lush vegetation. From July to September is the second dry season, the Xagaa (pronounced "Hagaa"). The Dayr, which is the shortest rainy season, lasts from October to December. The tangambili periods that intervene between the two monsoons (October–November and March–May) are hot and humid.

Climate data for Mogadishu (1961-1990 normals)
Month	Jan	Feb	Mar	Apr	May	Jun	Jul	Aug	Sep	Oct	Nov	Dec	Year
Record high °C (°F)	39.5 (103.1)	39.5 (103.1)	37.3 (99.1)	39.8 (103.6)	34.9 (94.8)	33.0 (91.4)	34.3 (93.7)	36.0 (96.8)	36.0 (96.8)	37.0 (98.6)	39.0 (102.2)	37.3 (99.1)	39.8 (103.6)
Mean daily maximum °C (°F)	30.2 (86.4)	30.2 (86.4)	30.9 (87.6)	32.2 (90.0)	31.2 (88.2)	29.6 (85.3)	28.6 (83.5)	28.6 (83.5)	29.4 (84.9)	30.2 (86.4)	30.6 (87.1)	30.8 (87.4)	30.2 (86.4)
Daily mean °C (°F)	26.6 (79.9)	26.9 (80.4)	28.0 (82.4)	28.9 (84.0)	28.2 (82.8)	26.7 (80.1)	25.4 (77.7)	25.9 (78.6)	26.5 (79.7)	27.3 (81.1)	27.5 (81.5)	26.9 (80.4)	27.1 (80.8)
Mean daily minimum °C (°F)	23.0 (73.4)	23.4 (74.1)	24.9 (76.8)	25.6 (78.1)	24.9 (76.8)	23.7 (74.7)	23.1 (73.6)	23.0 (73.4)	23.4 (74.1)	24.3 (75.7)	24.2 (75.6)	23.5 (74.3)	23.9 (75.0)
Record low °C (°F)	19.0 (66.2)	19.2 (66.6)	19.4 (66.9)	18.0 (64.4)	18.4 (65.1)	18.0 (64.4)	16.8 (62.2)	18.0 (64.4)	18.0 (64.4)	17.5 (63.5)	16.2 (61.2)	16.5 (61.7)	16.2 (61.2)
Average precipitation mm (inches)	0 (0)	0 (0)	8 (0.3)	61 (2.4)	61 (2.4)	82 (3.2)	64 (2.5)	44 (1.7)	25 (1.0)	32 (1.3)	43 (1.7)	9 (0.4)	428 (16.9)
Average precipitation days (≥ 0.1 mm)	0.3	0.1	0.6	4.8	6.7	12.7	13.3	10.2	4.9	3.9	4.1	1.5	63.0
Average relative humidity (%)	78	78	77	77	80	80	81	81	81	80	79	79	79
Mean monthly sunshine hours	266.6	251.4	282.1	261.0	272.8	219.0	226.3	254.2	264.0	266.6	261.0	257.3	3,082.3
Mean daily sunshine hours	8.6	8.9	9.1	8.7	8.8	7.3	7.3	8.2	8.8	8.6	8.7	8.3	8.4
Percentage possible sunshine	72	74	73	71	72	59	59	67	72	72	72	70	69
Source 1: Deutscher Wetterdienst
Source 2: Food and Agriculture Organization: Somalia Water and Land Management (percent sunshine)

Climate data for Kismayo
Month	Jan	Feb	Mar	Apr	May	Jun	Jul	Aug	Sep	Oct	Nov	Dec	Year
Record high °C (°F)	31.8 (89.2)	33.1 (91.6)	34.0 (93.2)	37.8 (100.0)	34.0 (93.2)	34.0 (93.2)	32.3 (90.1)	32.4 (90.3)	30.3 (86.5)	31.5 (88.7)	32.2 (90.0)	33.0 (91.4)	37.8 (100.0)
Mean daily maximum °C (°F)	29.6 (85.3)	29.9 (85.8)	31.0 (87.8)	31.8 (89.2)	30.4 (86.7)	28.6 (83.5)	28.0 (82.4)	28.3 (82.9)	28.6 (83.5)	29.5 (85.1)	30.5 (86.9)	30.5 (86.9)	29.7 (85.5)
Daily mean °C (°F)	27.1 (80.8)	27.3 (81.1)	28.2 (82.8)	28.6 (83.5)	27.3 (81.1)	26.1 (79.0)	25.6 (78.1)	25.7 (78.3)	26.0 (78.8)	26.8 (80.2)	27.5 (81.5)	27.5 (81.5)	27.0 (80.6)
Mean daily minimum °C (°F)	24.2 (75.6)	24.5 (76.1)	25.4 (77.7)	25.8 (78.4)	24.8 (76.6)	23.5 (74.3)	23.1 (73.6)	23.3 (73.9)	23.3 (73.9)	24.0 (75.2)	24.5 (76.1)	24.4 (75.9)	24.2 (75.6)
Record low °C (°F)	21.0 (69.8)	22.0 (71.6)	23.0 (73.4)	21.3 (70.3)	20.0 (68.0)	21.0 (69.8)	19.0 (66.2)	21.0 (69.8)	22.0 (71.6)	22.4 (72.3)	22.5 (72.5)	22.0 (71.6)	19.0 (66.2)
Average rainfall mm (inches)	1 (0.0)	1 (0.0)	3 (0.1)	39 (1.5)	111 (4.4)	89 (3.5)	52 (2.0)	21 (0.8)	21 (0.8)	15 (0.6)	17 (0.7)	3 (0.1)	374 (14.7)
Average rainy days (≥ 0.1 mm)	0	0	0	4	7	11	9	5	3	2	2	1	43
Average relative humidity (%)	77	76	76	77	80	80	80	79	78	78	77	77	78
Mean monthly sunshine hours	235.6	226.0	248.0	210.0	257.3	207.0	192.2	251.1	225.0	248.0	225.0	217.0	2,742.2
Mean daily sunshine hours	7.6	8.0	8.0	7.0	8.3	6.9	6.2	8.1	7.5	8.0	7.5	7.0	7.5
Percentage possible sunshine	64	73	69	62	59	57	56	62	64	66	66	66	64
Source 1: Deutscher Wetterdienst
Source 2: Food and Agriculture Organization: Somalia Water and Land Management (percent sunshine)

== Terrain, vegetation and drainage ==
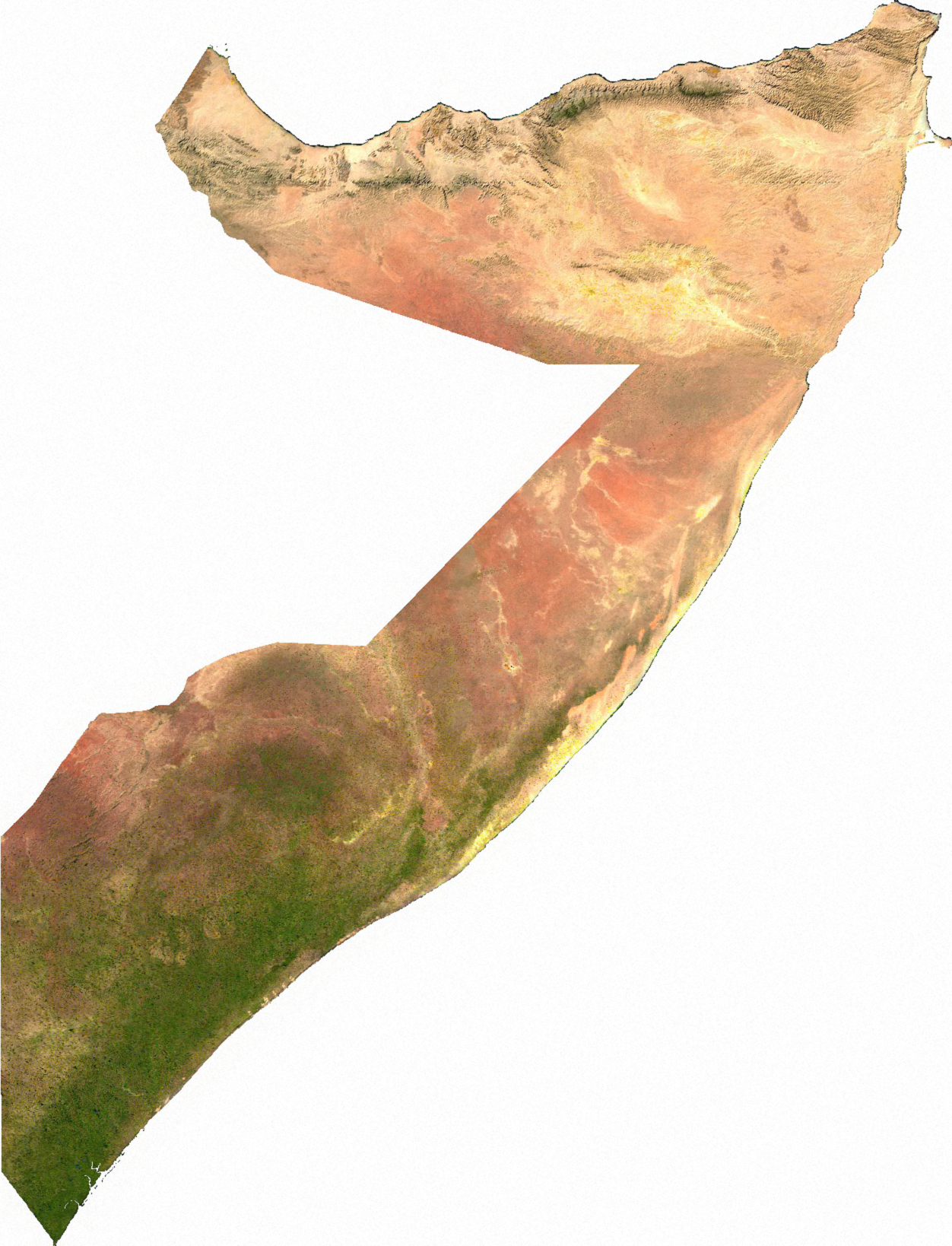
Satellite image of Somalia

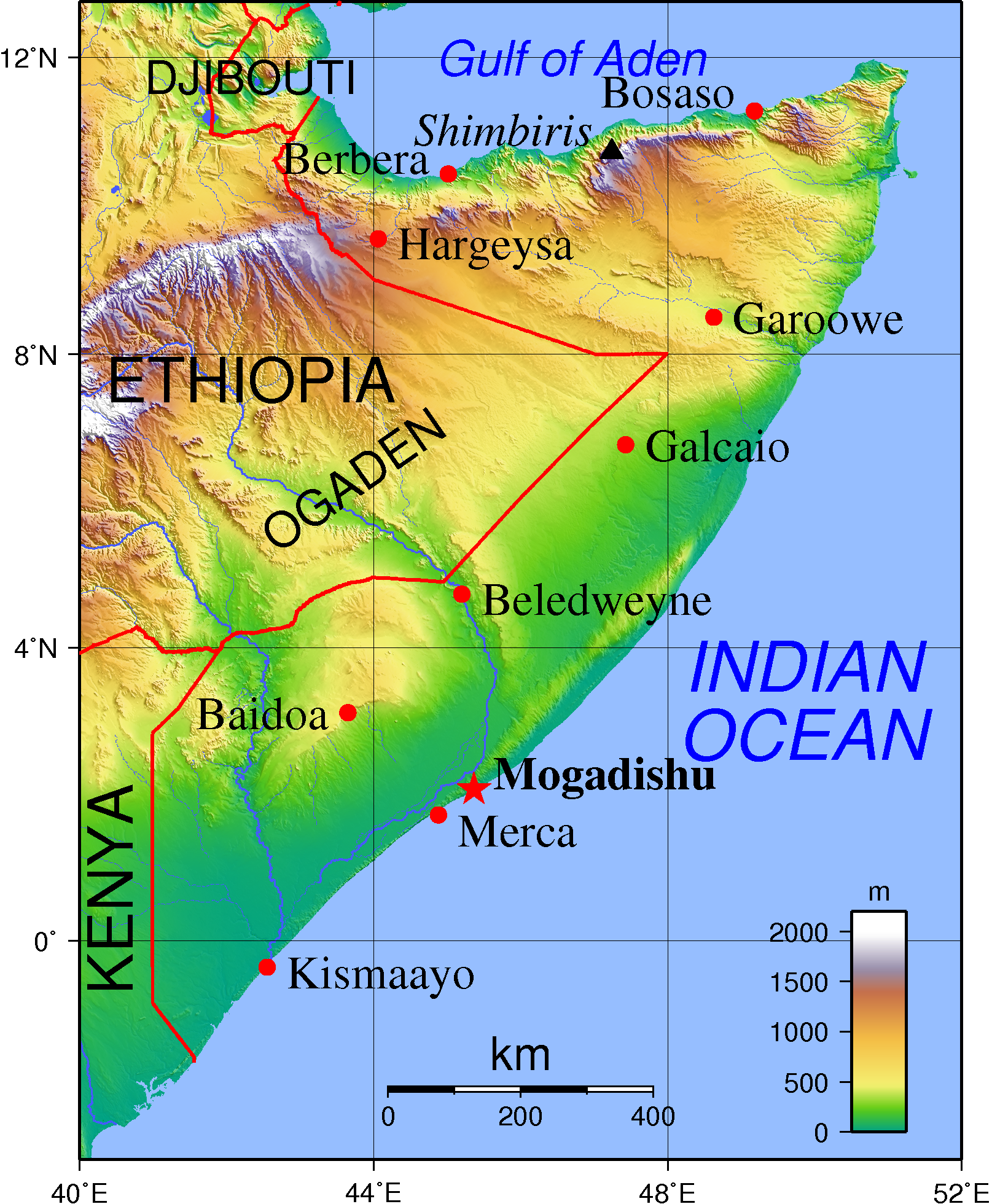
Topography of Somalia

Physio-graphically, Somalia is a land of limited contrast. In the north, a maritime semidesert plain parallels the Gulf of Aden coast, varying in width from roughly twelve kilometers in the west to as little as two kilometers in the east. Scrub-covered, this plain, known as the Guban (scrub land), is crossed by broad, shallow watercourses that are beds of dry sand except in the rainy seasons. When the rains arrive, the vegetation, which is a combination of low bushes and grass clumps, is quickly renewed, and for a time the guban provides some grazing for nomad livestock. This coastal strip is part of the Ethiopian xeric grasslands and shrublands ecoregion.

Inland from the gulf coast, the plain rises to the precipitous northward-facing cliffs of the dissected highlands. These form the rugged Karkaar mountain ranges that extend from the northwestern border with Ethiopia eastward to the tip of the Horn of Africa, where they end in sheer cliffs at Caseyr. The general elevation along the crest of these mountains averages about 1,800 meters above sea level south of the port town of Berbera, and eastward from that area it continues at 1,800 to 2,100 meters almost to Caseyr. The country's highest point, Shimber Berris, which rises to 2,460 meters, is located near the town of Erigavo.

Southward the mountains descend, often in scarped ledges, to an elevated plateau devoid of perennial rivers. This region of broken mountain terrain, shallow plateau valleys, and usually dry watercourses is known to the Somalis as the Ogo.

In the Ogo's especially arid eastern part, the plateau—broken by several isolated mountain ranges—gradually slopes toward the Somali Sea and in central Somalia constitutes the Mudug Plain. A major feature of this eastern section is the long and broad Nugaal Valley, with its extensive network of intermittent seasonal watercourses. The Nugaal river enters the Somali Sea at Eyl. The eastern area's population consists mainly of pastoral nomads eking a living in a zone of low and erratic rainfall.

The western part of the Ogo plateau region is crossed by numerous shallow valleys and dry watercourses. Annual rainfall is greater than in the east, and there are flat areas of arable land that provide a home for dryland cultivators. Most important, the western area has permanent wells to which the predominantly nomadic population returns during the dry seasons. The western plateau slopes gently southward and merges imperceptibly into an area known as the Haud, a broad, undulating terrain that constitutes some of the best grazing lands for Somali nomads, despite the lack of appreciable rainfall more than half the year. Enhancing the value of the Haud are the natural depressions that during periods of rain become temporary lakes and ponds.

The Haud zone continues for more than sixty kilometers into Ethiopia, and the vast Somali Plateau, which lies between the northern Somali mountains and the highlands of southeast Ethiopia, extends south and eastward through Ethiopia into central and southwest Somalia. The portion of the Haud lying within Ethiopia was the subject of an agreement made during the colonial era. In 1948, under pressure from their World War II allies and to the dismay of the Somalis, the British "returned" the Haud (an important Somali grazing area that was presumably 'protected' by British treaties with the Somalis in 1884 and 1886) and the Ogaden to Ethiopia, based on an 1897 treaty in which the British ceded Somali territory to the Ethiopian Emperor Menelik in exchange for his help against plundering by Somali clans. Britain included the proviso that the Somali nomads would retain their autonomy, but Ethiopia immediately claimed sovereignty over them. This prompted an unsuccessful bid by Britain in 1956 to buy back the Somali lands it had turned over. The stretch of land has since been a considerable source of regional strife.

Southwestern Somalia is dominated by the country's only two permanent rivers, the Jubba and the Shabeelle. With their sources in the Ethiopian highlands, these rivers flow in a generally southerly direction, cutting wide valleys in the Somali Plateau as it descends toward the sea; the plateau's elevation falls off rapidly in this area. The adjacent coastal zone, which includes the lower reaches of the rivers and extends from the Mudug Plain to the Kenyan border, averages 180 meters above sea level.

The Jubba River enters the Somali Sea at Kismaayo. Although the Shabeelle River at one time apparently also reached the sea near Merca, its course is thought to have changed in prehistoric times. The Shabeelle now turns southwestward near Balcad (about thirty kilometers north of Mogadishu) and parallels the coast for more than eighty-five kilometers. The river is perennial only to a point southwest of Mogadishu; thereafter it consists of swampy areas and dry reaches and is finally lost in the sand east of Jilib, not far from the Jubba River. During the flood seasons, the Shabeelle River may fill its bed to a point near Jilib and occasionally may even break through to the Jubba River farther south. Favorable rainfall and soil conditions make the entire riverine region a fertile agricultural area and the center of the country's largest sedentary population.

In most of northern, northeastern, and north-central Somalia, where rainfall is low, the vegetation consists of scattered low trees, including various acacias, and widely scattered patches of grass. This vegetation gives way to a combination of low bushes and grass clumps in the highly arid areas of the northeast and along the Gulf of Aden.

As elevations and rainfall increase in the maritime ranges of the north, the vegetation becomes denser. Aloes are common, and on the higher plateau areas of the Ogo are woodlands. At a few places above 1,500 meters, the remnants of juniper forests (protected by the state) and areas of Euphorbia candelabrum (a chandelier-type spiny plant) occur. In the more arid highlands of the northeast, Boswellia and Commiphora trees are sources, respectively, of the frankincense and myrrh for which Somalia has been known since ancient times.

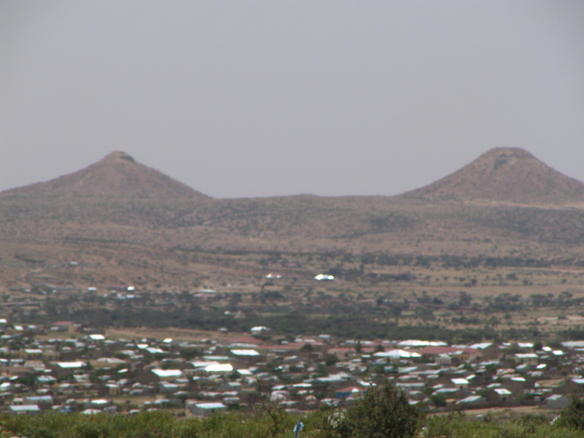
Hargeisa and much of northwestern Somalia is desert or hilly terrain. Here, the thelarchic-shaped Naasa Hablood hills are shown.

A broad plateau encompassing the northern city of Hargeysa, which receives comparatively heavy rainfall, is covered naturally by woodland (much of which has been degraded by overgrazing) and in places by extensive grasslands. Parts of this area have been under cultivation since the 1930s, producing sorghum and maize; in the 1990s it constituted the only significant region of sedentary cultivation outside southwestern Somalia.

The Haud south of Hargeysa is covered mostly by a semiarid woodland of scattered trees, mainly acacias, underlain by grasses that include species especially favored by livestock as forage. There vegetation forms spatially periodic patterns reminiscent of a tiger skin when viewed from above and therefore knowns as "tiger bush". As the Haud merges into the Mudug Plain in central Somalia, the aridity increases and the vegetation takes on a subdesert character. Farther southward the terrain gradually changes to semiarid woodlands and grasslands as the annual precipitation increases.

The region encompassing the Shabeelle and Jubba rivers is relatively well watered and constitutes the country's most arable zone. The lowland between the rivers supports rich pasturage. It features arid to subarid savanna, open woodland, and thickets that include frequently abundant underlying grasses. There are areas of grassland, and in the far southwest, near the Kenyan border, some dry evergreen forests are found.

Along the Somali Sea from Hobyo southwestward to near Mogadishu lies a stretch of dry coastal sand dunes, the Hobyo grasslands and shrublands ecoregion. This area is covered with scattered scrub and grass clumps where rainfall is sufficient although unpredictable. Much of this coast is thinly populated but overgrazing, particularly south of Mogadishu, has resulted in the destruction of the protective vegetation cover and the gradual movement of the once-stationary dunes inland. The original flora of this coast contains a number of endemic species and beginning in the early 1970s, efforts were made to stabilize these dunes by replanting. Endemic mammals are the silver dik-dik (Madoqua piacentinii), one of the world's smallest antelopes, and the Somali golden mole (Calcochloris tytonis). Other endemic species include two reptiles, a skink Haackgreerius miopus and a lizard Latastia cherchii and two birds, Ash's lark (Mirafra ashi) and the Obbia lark (Spizocorys obbiensis). The long-term political strife in Somalia has meant the coast is poorly studied and the state of the habitat unknown.

Other vegetation includes plants and grasses found in the swamps into which the Shabeelle River empties most of the year and in other large swamps in the course of the lower Jubba River. Swamps of East African mangroves are found at points along the coast, particularly from Kismaayo to near the Kenyan border. Uncontrolled exploitation appears to have caused some damage to forests in that area. Other mangroves are located near Mogadishu and at a number of places along the northeastern and northern coasts.

== Data ==
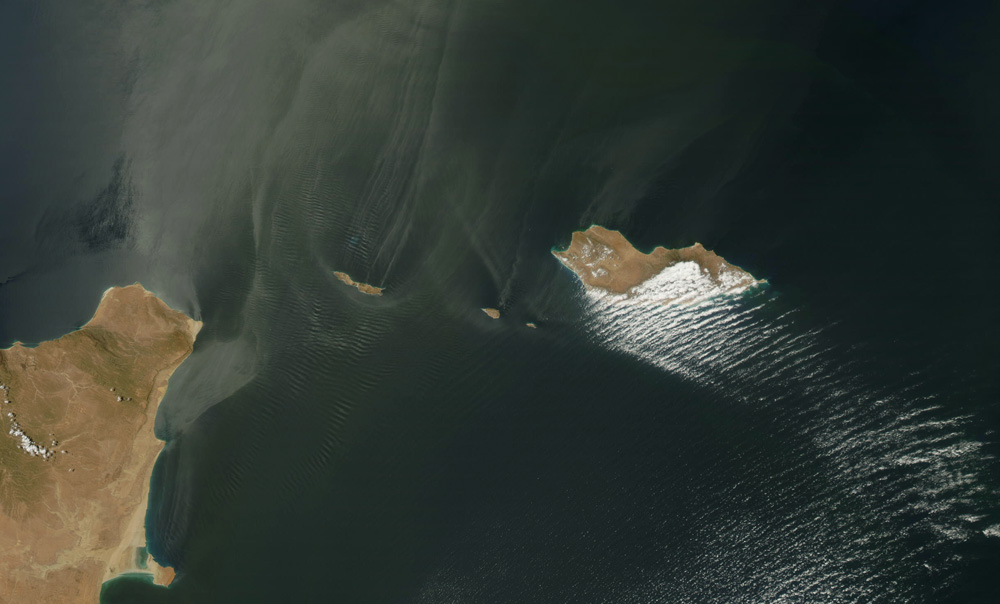
The Guardafui Channel, between the tip of Somalia and Socotra island.

Location: Horn of Africa

Geographic coordinates: 10°00′N 49°00′E

Continent: Africa

Area:
total: 637,657 km^{2} (246,201 sq mi)
land: 627,337 km^{2} (242,216 sq mi)
water: 10,320 km^{2} (3,980 sq mi)

Area - comparative: slightly smaller than the United States state of Texas

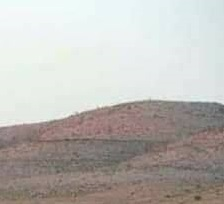
Dulbiciid in Godaalo, Xudun District, tallest Somalia mountain outside karkaar range

Land boundaries:
total: 2,366 km (1,470 mi)
border countries: Djibouti 60 km (37 mi), Ethiopia 1,626 km (1,010 mi), and Kenya for 682 km (424 mi)

Coastline: 3,333 km (2,071 mi)

Maritime claims:
Exclusive Economic Zone: 825,052 km^{2} (318,554 sq mi) with 200 nmi (370.4 km; 230.2 mi)

Climate: principally desert; December to February - northeast monsoon, moderate temperatures in north and very hot in south; May to October - southwest monsoon, torrid in the north and hot in the south, irregular rainfall, hot and humid periods (tangambili) between monsoons

Terrain: mostly flat to undulating plateau rising to hills in north

Elevation extremes:
lowest point: Indian Ocean 0 m (0 ft)
highest point: Shimbiris 2,460 m (8,070 ft)

Natural resources: uranium and largely unexploited reserves of iron ore, tin, gypsum, bauxite, copper, salt, natural gas

Land use:
arable land: 1.64%
permanent crops: 0.04%
other: 98.32% (2005)

Irrigated land: 2,000 km^{2} (770 sq mi) (2003)

Natural hazards: recurring droughts; frequent dust storms over eastern plains in summer; floods during rainy season

Man-made hazards: desertification; deforestation; overgrazing; soil erosion; waste dumping; overfishing

International environment agreements:
party to: Biodiversity, Desertification, Endangered Species, Law of the Sea, Ozone Layer Protection
signed, but not ratified: Marine Dumping, Nuclear Test Ban

Geography - note: Strategic location on Horn of Africa along southern approaches to Bab el Mandeb and route through Red Sea and Suez Canal. The Provisional Administrative Line forms the de facto southern border between Somalia and Ethiopia.

== Extreme points ==
This is a list of the extreme points of Somalia, the points that are farther north, south, east or west than any other location.

- Northernmost point – Alula Lagoon, Bari region
- Easternmost point – Ras Hafun, Bari region*
- Westernmost point – the western section of the border with Kenya**
- * This is also the easternmost point of the African continent
- ** Somalia does not have a westernmost point, the western section of the border being formed by the 41° longitude

== See also ==
- Somalia
- List of cities in Somalia
