= Hobyo grasslands and shrublands =

Desert and xeric scrubland ecoregion in Somalia

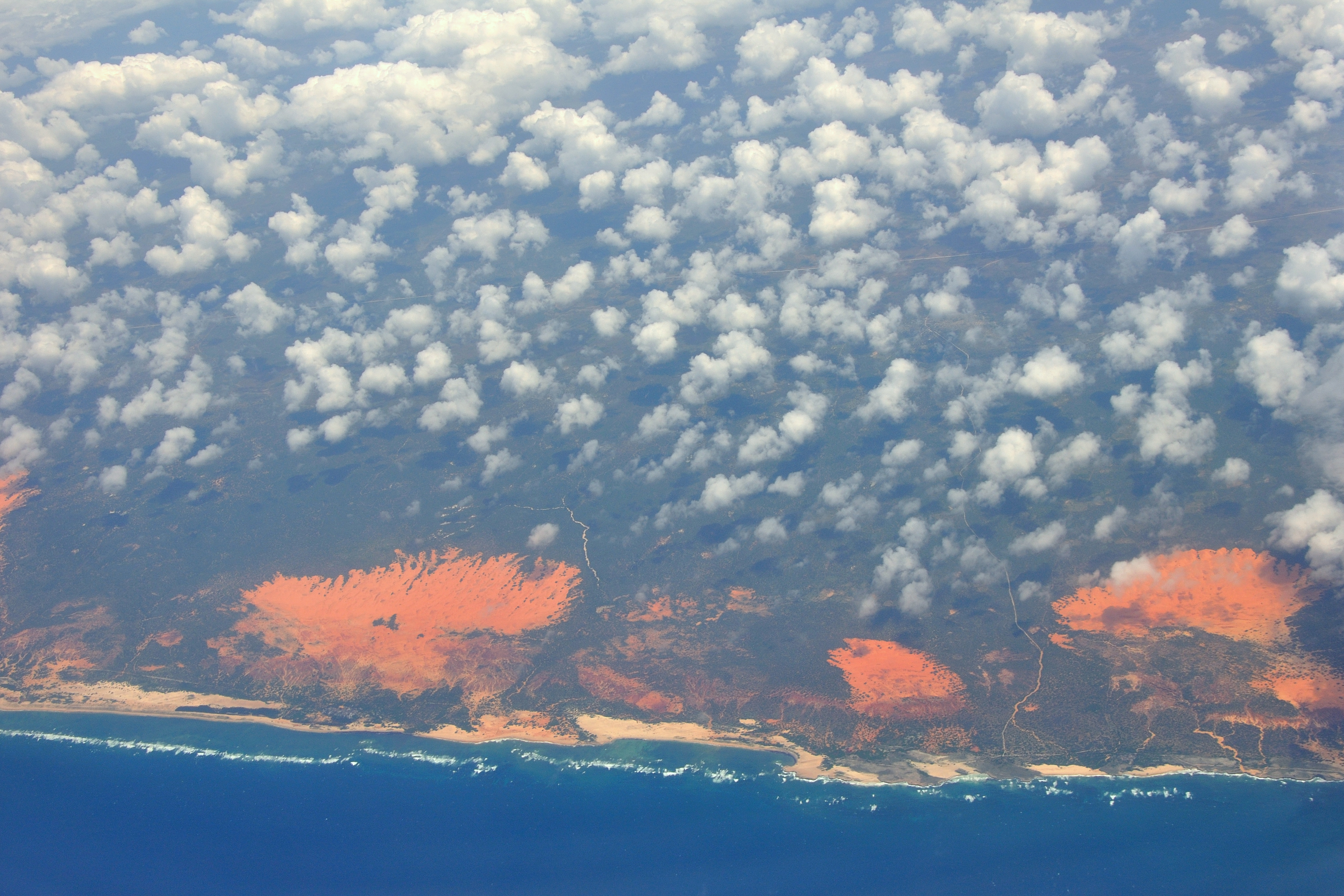
- Somali coast south of Mogadishu

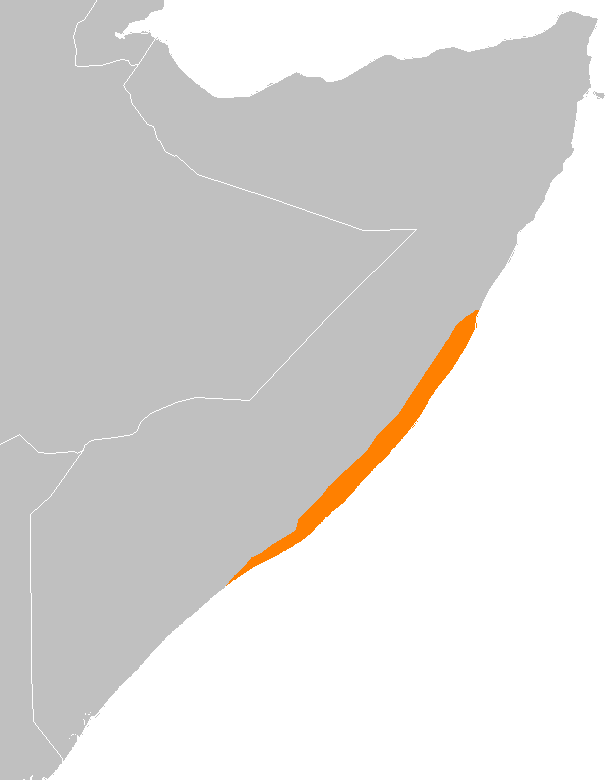
- map of Hobyo grasslands and shrublands ecoregion

Ecology
- Realm: Afrotropic
- Biome: Deserts and xeric shrublands

Geography
- Area: 26,200 km^{2} (10,100 sq mi)
- Country: Somalia

Conservation
- Conservation status: vulnerable
- Protected: 0%

The Hobyo grasslands and shrublands is a desert and xeric scrubland ecoregion in Somalia. The ecoregion includes a belt of coastal dunes, 10 to 15 km wide, along the Indian Ocean coast, extending from north of Hobyo to south of Mogadishu.

== Geography ==
The ecoregion forms a strip along Somalia's low-lying coastal plain facing the Indian Ocean.

The ecoregion extends for approximately 800 km along the coast, from about 2º and 5º N latitude. The dunes reach 10 to 15 miles inland from the coast. They are composed of white or orange sand, and are up to 60 meters high. The dunes are geologically recent, and formed over a basement of precambrian rocks. There are some outcrops of limestone among the dunes. Inland it transitions to dry savanna and semi-desert scrublands.

== Climate ==
The climate is tropical, and generally hot and dry. Because of its location near the equator temperature varies little throughout the year, with maximum temperatures between 30 and 33 °C and mean minimum temperatures between 21 and 27 °C. Average annual rainfall is about 200 mm. Rainfall occurs mostly from April to June, as the Intertropical Convergence Zone (ITCZ) moves northwards.

Most of the ecoregion is sparsely populated, and its sandy soils are ill-suited to agriculture. Mogadishu, Somalia's capital and largest city, is located on the coast in the southern part of the ecoregion.

== Flora ==
The dunes support distinctive grassland and scrubland plant communities. Dune grassland is the most widespread plant community. Other plants include succulent plants, cushion plants, and low shrubs.

Dense evergreen thickets are found near the coast, where coastal breezes provide humidity but keep the plants low. Typical shrubs are Aerva javanica, Indigofera sparteola, Jatropha pelargoniifolia, and Farsetia longisiliqua.

Gorges in the limestone outcrops provide some shelter from the wind and deeper soils which retain more moisture. These gorges support a distinct bushland plant community of Buxus hildebrandtii, Maytenus undata, Vepris eugeniifolia, Dirachma somalensis, and Lopriorea ruspolii.

== Fauna ==
The silver dik-dik (Madoqua piacentinii) and Somali golden mole (Chlorotalpa tytonis) are endemic to the ecoregion. It is home to several species of antelope limited to the Horn of Africa, including the dibatag (Ammodorcas clarkei), Soemmerring's gazelle (Nanger soemmerringii), Salt's dik-dik (Madoqua saltiana), and Speke's gazelle (Gazella spekei).

Two bird species are endemic to the ecoregion, Ash's lark (Mirafra ashi) and Obbia lark (Spizocorys obbiensis). The ecoregion corresponds to the Central Somali coast endemic bird area.

The reptiles Haackgreerius miopus and Latastia cherchii are endemic.

== Protected areas ==
None of the ecoregion is in protected areas.
