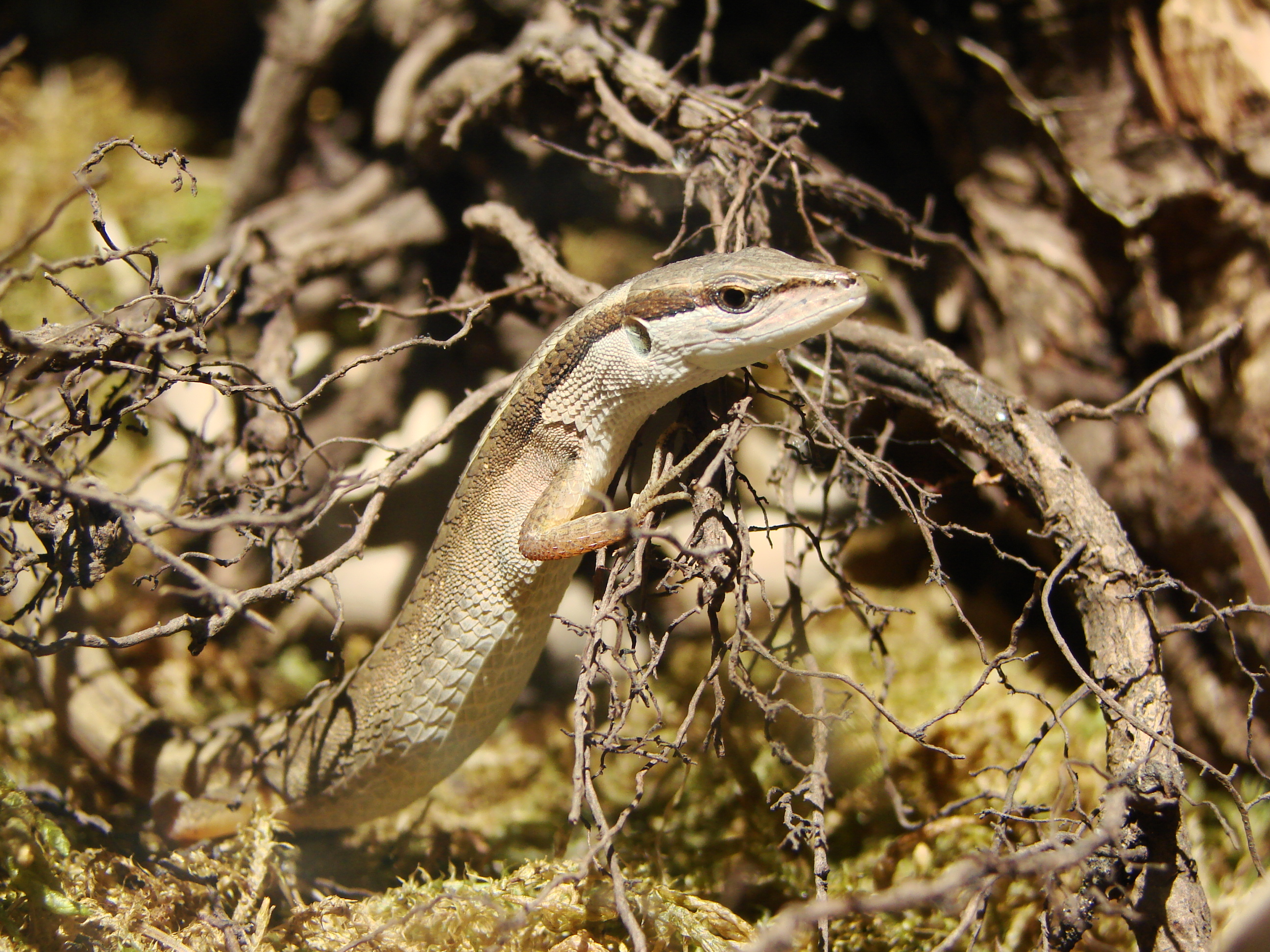

Conservation status
- Least Concern (IUCN 3.1)

Scientific classification
- Kingdom: Animalia
- Phylum: Chordata
- Class: Reptilia
- Order: Squamata
- Family: Lacertidae
- Genus: Latastia
- Species: L. longicaudata

Binomial name
- Latastia longicaudata (Reuss, 1834)

= Latastia longicaudata =

Species of lizard

Latastia longicaudata, also known commonly as the common long-tailed lizard and the southern long-tailed lizard, is a species of lizard in the family Lacertidae. The species is native to northern sub-Saharan Africa. There are four recognized subspecies.

== Geographic range ==
L. longicaudata is found in Cameroon, Central African Republic, Djibouti, Egypt, Ethiopia, Kenya, Mali, Mauritania, Niger, Senegal, Somalia, Sudan, Tanzania, and Yemen.

== Subspecies ==
The following four subspecies, including the nominotypical subspecies, are recognized as being valid.

- Latastia longicaudata andersoni Boulenger, 1921
- Latastia longicaudata lanzai Arillo, Balletto & Spanó, 1967
- Latastia longicaudata longicaudata (Reuss, 1834)
- Latastia longicaudata revoili (Vaillant, 1882)

Nota bene: A trinomial authority in parentheses indicates that the subspecies was originally described in a genus other than Latastia.

== Etymology ==
The subspecific names, lanzai and revoili, are in honor of Italian herpetologist Benedetto Lanza and French naturalist Georges Révoil, respectively.

== Reproduction ==
L. longicaudata is oviparous.
