= Duvalius abyssimus =

Scientific classification
- Kingdom: Animalia
- Phylum: Arthropoda
- Class: Insecta
- Order: Coleoptera
- Suborder: Adephaga
- Family: Carabidae
- Genus: Duvalius
- Species: D. abyssimus

Binomial name
- Duvalius abyssimus Reboleira & Ortuño, 2014

Species of beetle

Duvalius abyssimus is a species of beetle first described in 2014 by biologists Ana Sofia Reboleira and Vicente Ortuño. The beetle is native to the Krubera Cave in the Arabika Massif, Western Caucasus. It was discovered during expeditions to Krubera-Vorónia in 2010 (the deepest cave in the world at the time).

== Habitat ==
The specimens were found in the upper part of the cave, at 60 meters depth. In this part of the cave, temperature is about 3 °C and humidity is 100%.

== Description ==
Duvalius abyssimus measure 6.6–6.8 mm (0.26–0.27 in) in total body length. The eyes are reduced.
