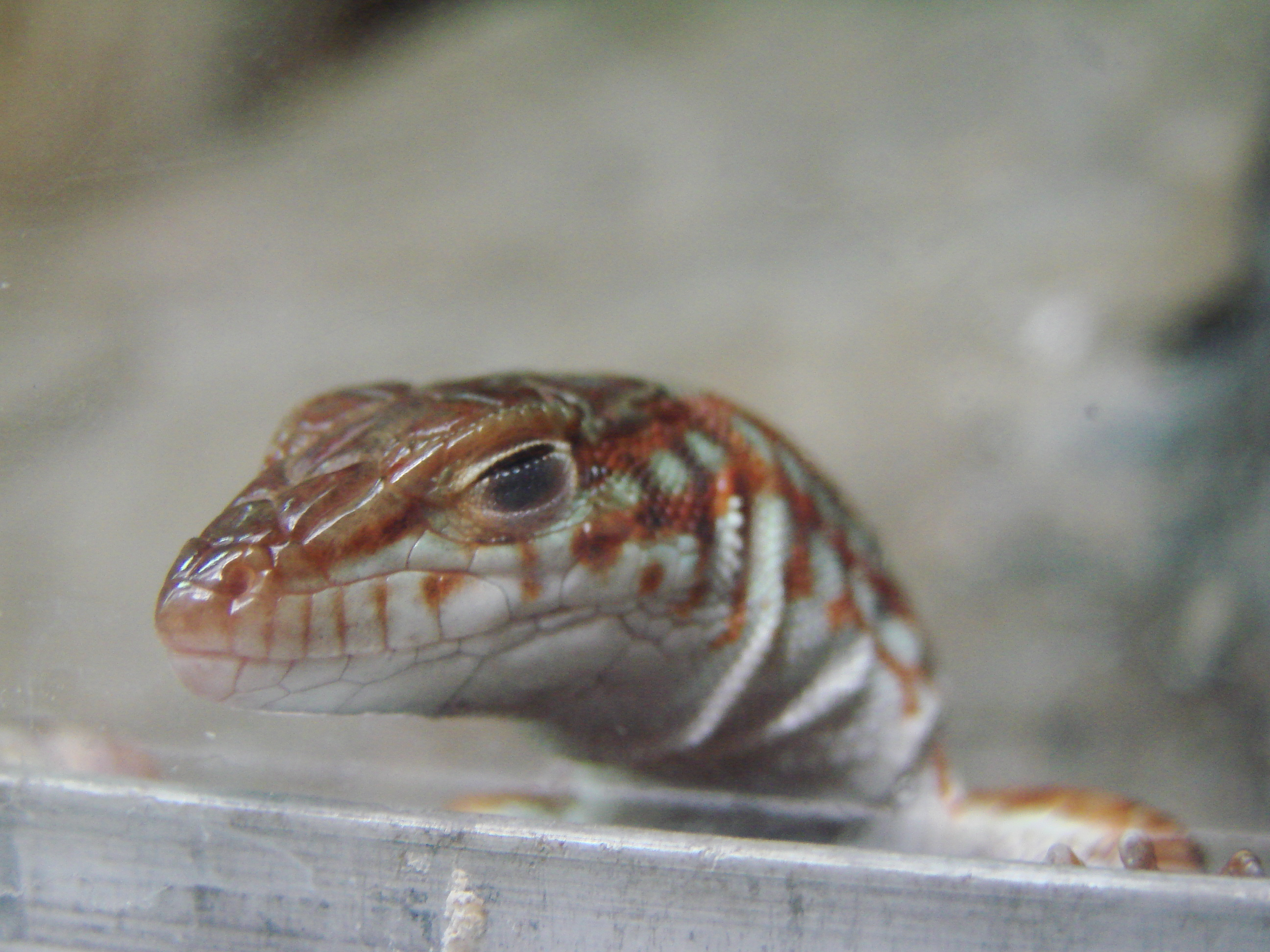
- Latastia longicaudata

Scientific classification
- Kingdom: Animalia
- Phylum: Chordata
- Class: Reptilia
- Order: Squamata
- Family: Lacertidae
- Subfamily: Lacertinae
- Genus: Latastia; Bedriaga, 1884

Species
- See text.

= Latastia =

Genus of lizards

Latastia is a genus of lizards of the family Lacertidae. Species of this genus are distributed in Africa (Egypt, Ethiopia, Djibouti, Eritrea, Guinea-Bissau, Cameroon, Kenya, Malawi, Mali, Mozambique, Niger, Zambia, Senegal, Zimbabwe, Somalia, Sudan, South Sudan, Tanzania) but one subspecies (Latastia longicaudata andersonii) lives in Yemen. Collectively, they are known as long-tailed lizards.

== Etymology ==
Jacques von Bedriaga named this genus in honor of French herpetologist Fernand Lataste.

== Diagnosis ==
Species of Latastia are medium to large-sized lacertids with long cylindrical tails. The unregenerated tail is up to 3.2 times longer than head and body. Eyes with movable lids. The nostril is surrounded by 3-5 scales and usually reaches the first supralabial. The collar is well marked. Ventral plates smooth and in 6 longitudinal series (sometimes 8-10 with outer plates small). The dorsal scales are homogenous, small and granular or imbricate. There are no expanded scales along the mid-back line as in Philochortus. Femoral pores are present on the inside of the thighs, more prominent in males. Tail base in males much broader than in females.

== Habitat and natural history ==
Most long-tailed lizards of the genus Latastia inhabit well vegetated sandy or gravelly plains and large wadis in western and eastern Africa. They can be found in semidesert scrubland and deciduous Acacia-Commiphora bushland where scrubby undergrowth is plentiful, in moist savanna and high grassland or in millet fields. Latastia boscai boscai and L. b. burii are known to occur in stony and rocky localities. Species of Latastia are distributed from sea level to 2000 m altitude. They are diurnal, heliophilous and terrestrial, extremely wary fast-running lacertids which wander over large territories but forage mostly within vegetation cover during the heat of the day. They dart out into the sun to capture insects and other arthropods, after which they retreat into shady areas beneath bushes (thermoregulation). All species lay eggs but clutch details are known only for L. longicaudata. The population in Senegal (L. l. longicaudata) produces clutches of 5-7 eggs between July and September while females of L. l. revoili in southeastern Kenya lay only 3-4 eggs/clutch. Hatchlings appear during the wet season.

== Species ==
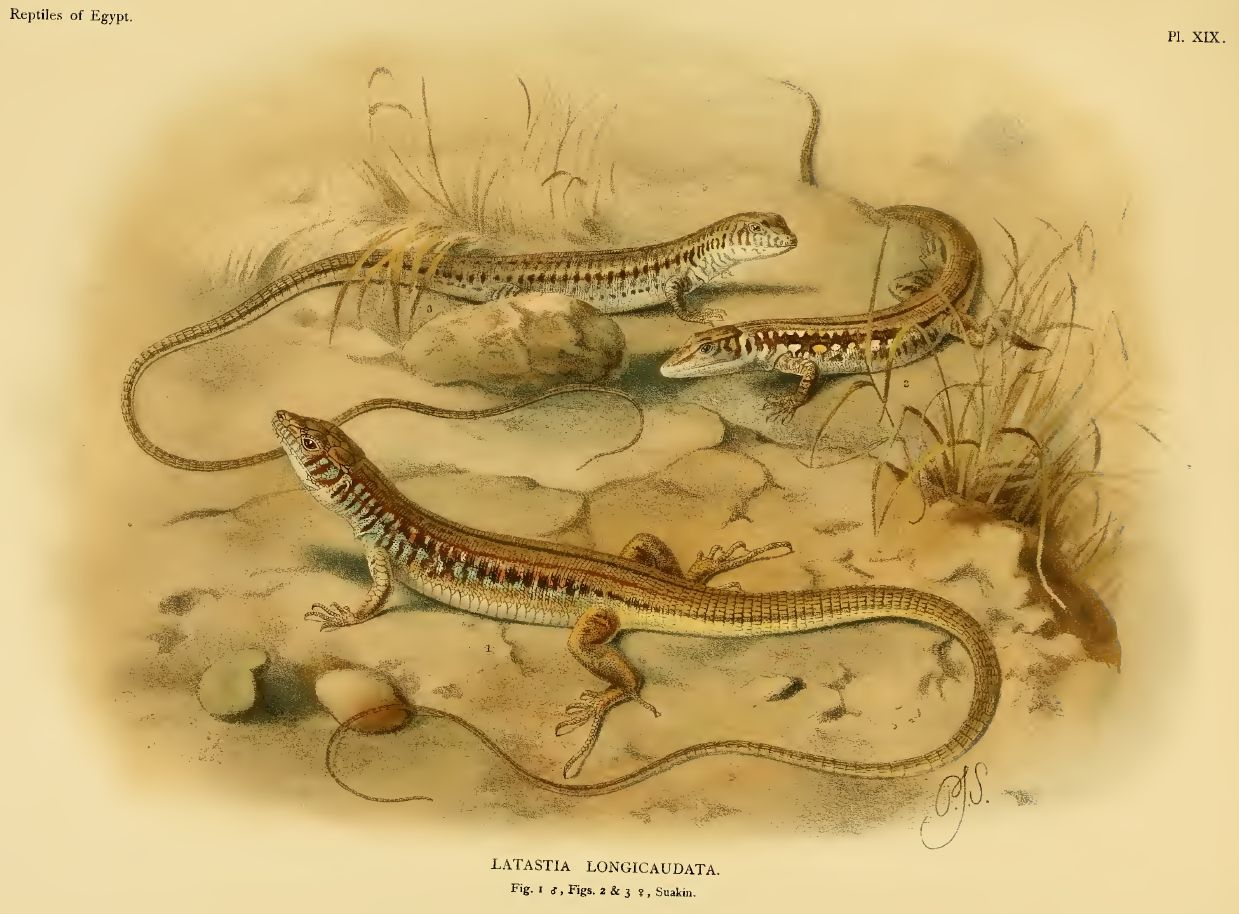
Latastia longicaudata longicaudata

The genus is composed of 10 recognized species. Subspecies are described for Latastia boscai, L. doriai, and L. longicaudata.

- Latastia boscai Bedriaga, 1884 – Eritrea long-tailed lizard, Bosca's long-tailed lizard
  - L. b. boscai Bedriaga, 1884
  - L. b. arenicola Parker, 1942
  - L. b. burii Boulenger, 1907
- Latastia caeruleopunctata Parker, 1935 – Parker's long-tailed lizard
- Latastia cherchii Arillo, Balletto & Spanò, 1967
- Latastia doriai Bedriaga, 1884 – Doria's long-tailed lizard
  - L. d. doriai Bedriaga, 1884
  - L. d. martensi Bedriaga, 1884
  - L. d. scorteccii Arillo, Balletto & Spanò, 1967
- Latastia johnstoni Boulenger, 1907 – Johnston's long-tailed lizard, Nyasaland long-tailed lizard
- Latastia longicaudata (Reuss, 1834) – southern long-tailed lizard, common long-tailed lizard
  - L. l. longicaudata (Reuss, 1834)
  - L. l. andersonii Boulenger, 1921
  - L. l. lanzai Arillo, Balletto & Spanò, 1967
  - L. l. revoili (Vaillant, 1882)
- Latastia ornata Monard, 1940
- Latastia petersiana Mertens, 1938 – Peters's long-tailed lizard
- Latastia siebenrocki (Tornier, 1905) – Siebenrock's long-tailed lizard
- Latastia taylori Parker, 1942 – Taylor's long-tailed lizard

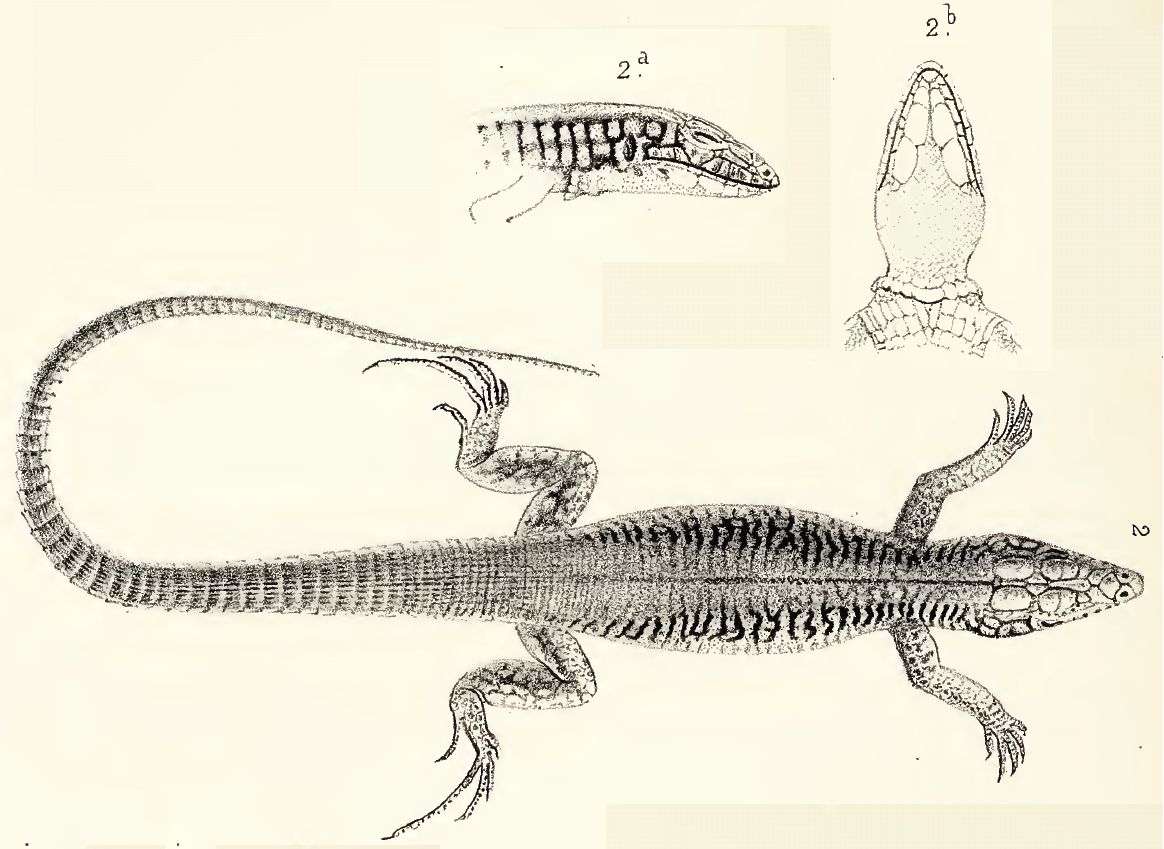
Latastia longicaudata revoili

Latastia petersiana Mertens, 1938 is the new name for Latastia carinata (W. Peters, 1874).

Nota bene: A binomial authority in parentheses indicates that the species was originally described in a genus other than Latastia.
