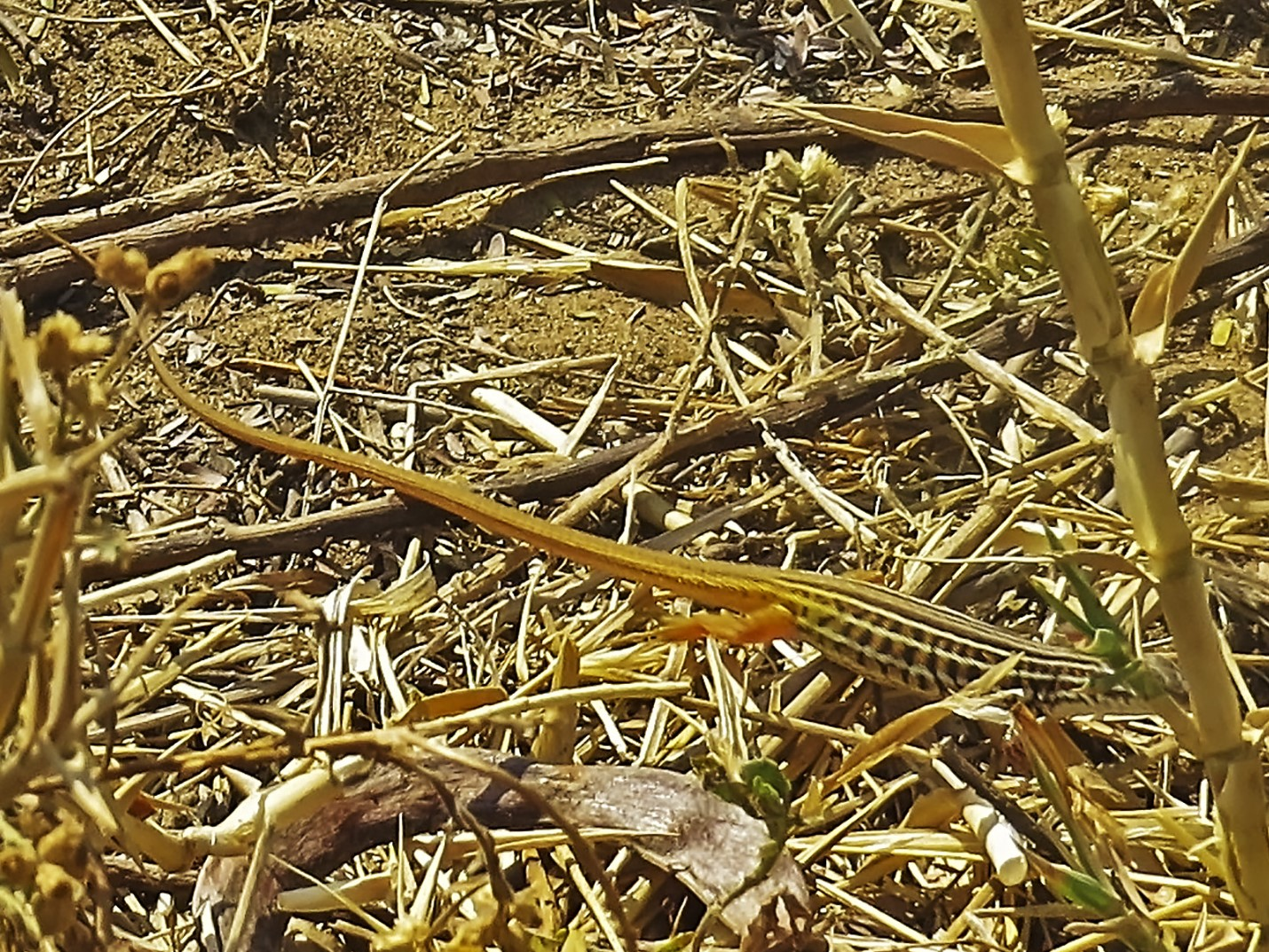

Conservation status
- Least Concern (IUCN 3.1)

Scientific classification
- Kingdom: Animalia
- Phylum: Chordata
- Class: Reptilia
- Order: Squamata
- Family: Lacertidae
- Genus: Latastia
- Species: L. johnstonii

Binomial name
- Latastia johnstonii Boulenger, 1907

Synonyms
- Latastia kidwelli Boulenger, 1919; Latastia bredoi de Witte, 1942

= Latastia johnstonii =

Species of lizard

Latastia johnstonii, commonly known as Johnston's long-tailed lizard, Malawi long-tailed lizard, and Nyasaland long-tailed lizard, is a species of lizard in the family Lacertidae. The species is native to East Africa.

== Etymology ==
The specific name, johnstonii, is in honour of British explorer Harry Johnston.

== Description ==
L. johnstonii has keeled dorsal scales, which are arranged in 39–52 rows at midbody. The tail of juveniles is red, the color fading at adulthood. Adults have a total length (including tail) of 15–20 cm (5.9–7.9 in). The tail length is 65–75% of the total length.

== Distribution and habitat ==
L. johnstonii is found in Democratic Republic of the Congo, Malawi, Mozambique, Tanzania, Zambia, and Zimbabwe.

The preferred natural habitats of L. johnstonii are grassland and savanna, at altitudes of 330–1,000 m (1,080–3,280 ft).

== Ecology and behavior ==
L. johnstonii is terrestrial, diurnal, and fast-moving. L. johnstonii preys upon invertebrates.

L. johnstonii is oviparous. Clutch size is three or four eggs, and each egg measures 12 mm × 7 mm (0.47 in × 0.28 in).
