= Latastia taylori =

Conservation status
- Least Concern (IUCN 3.1)

Scientific classification
- Kingdom: Animalia
- Phylum: Chordata
- Class: Reptilia
- Order: Squamata
- Family: Lacertidae
- Genus: Latastia
- Species: L. taylori

Binomial name
- Latastia taylori Parker, 1942

Species of lizard

Latastia taylori, also known commonly as Taylor's long-tailed lizard or Taylor's longtail lizard, is a species of lizard in the family Lacertidae. The species is endemic to Somalia.

== Etymology ==
The specific name, taylori, is in honor of British army officer, Captain R. H. R. Taylor.

== Reproduction ==
L. taylori is oviparous.
