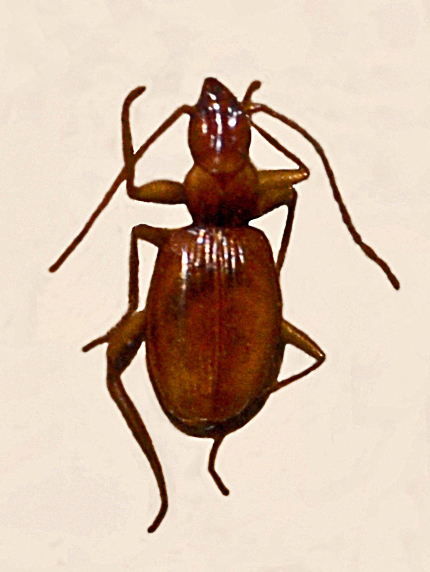
- Duvalius doriae doriae

Scientific classification
- Kingdom: Animalia
- Phylum: Arthropoda
- Clade: Pancrustacea
- Class: Insecta
- Order: Coleoptera
- Suborder: Adephaga
- Family: Carabidae
- Genus: Duvalius
- Species: D. doriae

Binomial name
- Duvalius doriae (Fairmaire, 1859)

Synonyms
- Anophthalmus doriae Fairmaire, 1859

= Duvalius doriae =

Species of beetle

Duvalius doriae, the Doria's cave beetle, is a species of beetle belonging to the family Carabidae.

== Etymology ==
This species, the first blind beetle found in Italy, was discovered in 1858 in the cave of Cassana in the Eastern Liguria by the Italian naturalist Giacomo Doria and by the geologist Giovanni Capellini. The French entomologist Leon Fairmaire named this species Anophthalmus doriae in honor of Giacomo Doria.

== Subspecies ==
There are two subspecies:

- Duvalius doriae doriae (Fairmaire, 1859)
- Duvalius doriae liguricus (Dieck, 1869)

== Description ==
This cave predator ground beetle has no wings or functional eyes.

== Distribution ==
This species is endemic to Italy.
