= Latastia caeruleopunctata =

Scientific classification
- Domain: Eukaryota
- Kingdom: Animalia
- Phylum: Chordata
- Class: Reptilia
- Order: Squamata
- Family: Lacertidae
- Genus: Latastia
- Species: L. caeruleopunctata

Binomial name
- Latastia caeruleopunctata Parker, 1935

Species of lizard

Latastia caeruleopunctata, also known as Parker's long-tailed lizard, is a species of lizard found in Ethiopia and Kenya.
