= Latastia boscai =

Conservation status
- Least Concern (IUCN 3.1)

Scientific classification
- Kingdom: Animalia
- Phylum: Chordata
- Class: Reptilia
- Order: Squamata
- Family: Lacertidae
- Genus: Latastia
- Species: L. boscai

Binomial name
- Latastia boscai Bedriaga, 1884

Species of lizard

Latastia boscai, also known commonly as the Eritrea longtail lizard or Bosca's long-tailed lizard, is a species of lizard in the family Lacertidae. The species is native to East Africa and the Horn of Africa. There are three recognized subspecies.

== Etymology ==
The specific name, boscai, is in honor of Spanish herpetologist Eduardo Boscá y Casanoves. The subspecific name, burii, is in honor of British naturalist George Wyman Bury.

== Geographic range ==
L. boscai is found in Djibouti, Eritrea, Ethiopia, and Somalia.

== Habitat ==
The preferred natural habitats of L. boscai are desert, savanna, and forest, at altitudes from sea level to 1,700 m (5,600 ft).

== Reproduction ==
L. boscai is oviparous.

== Subspecies ==
The following three subspecies are recognized as being valid, including the nominotypical subspecies.

- Latastia boscai arenicola Parker, 1942
- Latastia boscai boscai Bedriaga, 1884
- Latastia boscai burii Boulenger, 1907
