= Latastia siebenrocki =

Conservation status
- Data Deficient (IUCN 3.1)

Scientific classification
- Kingdom: Animalia
- Phylum: Chordata
- Class: Reptilia
- Order: Squamata
- Family: Lacertidae
- Genus: Latastia
- Species: L. siebenrocki

Binomial name
- Latastia siebenrocki (Tornier, 1905)

Synonyms
- Eremias siebenrocki Tornier, 1905; Latastia siebenrocki — Bauer & R. Günther, 1995

Species of lizard

Latastia siebenrocki, also known commonly as Siebenrock's longtail lizard or Siebenrock's long-tailed lizard, is a species of lizard in the family Lacertidae. The species is endemic to Guinea.

== Etymology ==
The specific name, siebenrocki, is in honor of Austrian herpetologist Friedrich Siebenrock.

== Geographic range ==
L. siebenrocki is found in Conakry, Guinea.

== Habitat ==
The preferred natural habitat of L. siebenrocki is unknown.

== Reproduction ==
L. siebenrocki is oviparous.
