= Myriopholis burii =

Conservation status
- Data Deficient (IUCN 3.1)

Scientific classification
- Kingdom: Animalia
- Phylum: Chordata
- Class: Reptilia
- Order: Squamata
- Suborder: Serpentes
- Family: Leptotyphlopidae
- Genus: Myriopholis
- Species: M. burii

Binomial name
- Myriopholis burii (Boulenger, 1905)

Synonyms
- Glauconia burii Boulenger, 1905; Leptotyphlops burii — Corkill & Cochrane, 1965; Myriopholis burii — Adalsteinsson et al., 2009

Species of snake

Myriopholis burii, commonly known as the Arabian blind snake or Bury's worm snake, is a species of snake in the family Leptotyphlopidae. The species is endemic to the Arabian Peninsula.

== Etymology ==
The specific name, burii, is in honor of British naturalist George Wyman Bury (1874-1920).

== Geographic range ==
M. burii is found in southwestern Saudi Arabia and southwestern Yemen at elevations of 1,350 to 1,460 m (4,430 to 4,790 ft).

== Behavior ==
M. burii is fossorial.

== Diet ==
The diet of M. burii consists of ant larvae.

== Reproduction ==
M. burii is oviparous.
