= Latastia petersiana =

Scientific classification
- Domain: Eukaryota
- Kingdom: Animalia
- Phylum: Chordata
- Class: Reptilia
- Order: Squamata
- Family: Lacertidae
- Genus: Latastia
- Species: L. petersiana

Binomial name
- Latastia petersiana Mertens, 1938)

Synonyms
- Latastia carinata

Species of lizard

Latastia petersiana, also known as Peters's long-tailed lizard, is a species of lizard endemic to Somalia.
