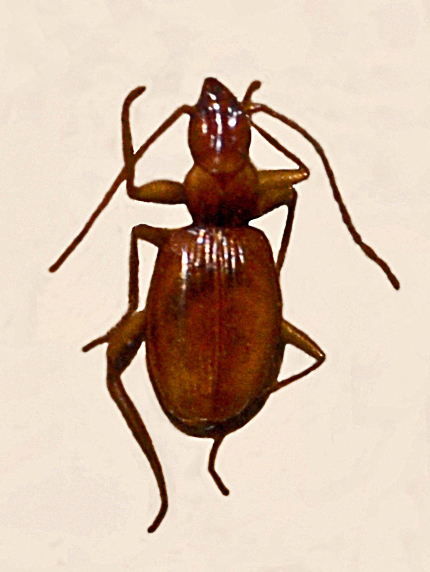
- Duvalius doriae

Scientific classification
- Kingdom: Animalia
- Phylum: Arthropoda
- Class: Insecta
- Order: Coleoptera
- Suborder: Adephaga
- Family: Carabidae
- Tribe: Trechini
- Genus: Duvalius; Delarouzée, 1859

Synonyms
- Javorella

= Duvalius =

Genus of beetles

Duvalius is a genus of beetles in the family Carabidae. They are distributed from the Mediterranean area to northwestern China. They typically live in caves and in shallow subterranean spaces. Many species are rare and have very restricted distributions.

== Species ==
The genus includes the following species:

- Duvalius abnormis Knirsch, 1913
- Duvalius abyssimus Reboleira & Ortuño, 2014
- Duvalius alexeevi Belousov, 1992
- Duvalius andreinii (Gestro, 1907)
- Duvalius andreuccii Magrini & Vanni, 1984
- Duvalius annamariae Vanni & Magrini, 1989
- Duvalius antonellae Casale, Giachino, Vailati & Vigna Taglianti, 1996
- Duvalius antoniae Reitter, 1892
- Duvalius apuanus Dodero, 1917
- Duvalius armeniacus Casale, 1979
- Duvalius arnoldii Jeannel, 1962
- Duvalius aroaniae Casale, Giachino, Vailati & Vigna Taglianti, 1996
- Duvalius auberti Grenier, 1864
- Duvalius babicola Knirsch, 1925
- Duvalius baborensis Bruneau de Mire, 1955
- Duvalius balazuci Bruneau de Mire, 1948
- Duvalius balcanicus (J. Frivaldszky, 1879)
- Duvalius baldensis Putzeys, 1870
- Duvalius balearicus Henrot, 1964
- Duvalius bastianini Magrini, 1998
- Duvalius battonii Straneo, 1959
- Duvalius bedelensis Janak & P. Moravac, 1989
- Duvalius bensai Castro, 1892
- Duvalius beroni V.B. Gueorguiev, 1971
- Duvalius bertagnii Magrini, 1998
- Duvalius berthae (Jeannel, 1910)
- Duvalius beshkovi Coiffait, 1970
- Duvalius bianchii Jeannel, 1928
- Duvalius bicikensis Perrault, 1971
- Duvalius biokovensis Holdhaus, 1911
- Duvalius bischoffi Maschnigg, 1936
- Duvalius bodoanus Reitter, 1913
- Duvalius bokori Csiki, 1910
- Duvalius boldorii Jeannel, 1926
- Duvalius bolei Pralmer, 1963
- Duvalius bonadonius Giordan & Raffaldi, 1982
- Duvalius bonzanoi Casale & Vigna Taglianti, 1990
- Duvalius bortesii Casale & Vigna Taglianti, 1984
- Duvalius boschi Jeannel, 1929
- Duvalius bradycephalus Jeannel, 1928
- Duvalius brandisi Ganglbauer, 1896
- Duvalius breiti Ganglbauer, 1900
- Duvalius breitianus Knirsch, 1912
- Duvalius brevipilosus Knirsch, 1927
- Duvalius brujasi Sainte-Claire Deville, 1901
- Duvalius bruschii Vigna Taglianti, 1999
- Duvalius bucurensis Janak, 1993
- Duvalius budae Kenderessy, 1879
- Duvalius bulgaricus Knirsch, 1924
- Duvalius bureschi Jeannel, 1928
- Duvalius cadurcus Jeannel, 1955
- Duvalius cailloli Sainte-Claire Deville, 1902
- Duvalius calandrii Casale & Vigna Taglianti, 1990
- Duvalius canevae Gestro, 1885
- Duvalius carantii Sella, 1874
- Duvalius carchinii Vigna Taglianti, Magrini & Vanni, 1993
- Duvalius casalei Sciaky, 1992
- Duvalius casellii Gestro, 1898
- Duvalius centenarius Knirsch, 1925
- Duvalius cerrutii Sbordoni & Di Domenico, 1967
- Duvalius cicioarae Jeannel, 1930
- Duvalius cirocchii Magrini & Vanni, 1986
- Duvalius clairi Abeille de Perrin, 1881
- Duvalius coaduroi Pace, 1986
- Duvalius cognatus J. Frivaldszky, 1879
- Duvalius coiffaiti Decou, 1967
- Duvalius comes Scheibel, 1934
- Duvalius comottii Casale, Giachino, Vailati & Vigna Taglianti, 1996
- Duvalius convexicollis Peyerimhoff, 1904
- Duvalius cornilloni Giordan & Raffaldi, 1998
- Duvalius corpulentus Weise, 1875
- Duvalius cuniculinus Knirsch, 1929
- Duvalius curtii Giordan & Raffaldi, 1983
- Duvalius cvijici (Jeannel, 1924)
- Duvalius cvijici Jeannel, 1924
- Duvalius degiovannii Magrini & Vanni, 1985
- Duvalius delamarei Decou, 1967
- Duvalius delphinensis Abeille de Perrin, 1869
- Duvalius deltshevi V.B. Gueorguiev, 1965
- Duvalius deubelianus Csiki, 1903
- Duvalius diaphanus Rottenberg, 1874
- Duvalius didonnai Magrini, Vanni & Inguscio, 1996
- Duvalius dieneri Csiki, 1910
- Duvalius diniensis Peyerimhoff, 1904
- Duvalius djokovici Ćurčic, Pavićević, Vesović, 2022
- Duvalius doderoi Gestro, 1885
- Duvalius dolops Jeannel, 1937
- Duvalius doriae Fairmaire, 1859
- Duvalius dragacevensis S.Curcic, Pavicevic & B.Curcic, 2001
- Duvalius droveniki Magrini, 1998
- Duvalius durmitorensis Apfelbeck, 1904
- Duvalius dvoraki P. Moravec, 1986
- Duvalius edithae Janak & P. Moravec, 1989
- Duvalius erichsonii Schaufuss, 1864
- Duvalius eurydice Schaufuss, 1881
- Duvalius exaratus Schaum, 1860
- Duvalius ferreresi Lagar Mascare, 1976
- Duvalius fodori Scheibel, 1937
- Duvalius franchettii Luigioni, 1926
- Duvalius fuchsi Scheibel, 1937
- Duvalius fulvii Casale, Giachino, Vailati & Vigna Taglianti, 1996
- Duvalius gaali Mallasz, 1928
- Duvalius gabriellavernae Casale, Giachino, Vailati & Vigna Taglianti, 1999
- Duvalius ganglbauerianus Knirsch, 1913
- Duvalius garevi Casale & Genest, 1991
- Duvalius gebhardti Bokor, 1926
- Duvalius gejzadunayi Lohaj, Čeplík & Lakota, 2013
- Duvalius genesti Casale & Vigna Taglianti, 1984
- Duvalius gentilei Gestro, 1885
- Duvalius georgii J. Muller, 1922
- Duvalius germanae Casale & Vigna Taglianti, 1990
- Duvalius gestroi Dodero, 1900
- Duvalius ghidinii Gestro & Dodero, 1909
- Duvalius giachinoi Casale & Vigna Taglianti, 1990
- Duvalius glabellus G. Etonti & M. Etonti, 1984
- Duvalius godeanus Janak, 1993
- Duvalius goemoeriensis Bokor, 1922
- Duvalius gogalai Pretnen, 1963
- Duvalius golesensis Winkler, 1926
- Duvalius gracilis Petri, 1912
- Duvalius graecus Casale, Giachino, Vailati & Vigna Taglianti, 1996
- Duvalius guareschii Moscandini, 1950
- Duvalius gusevi Belousov, 1989
- Duvalius hanae Hurka, 1990
- Duvalius hegeduesii J. Frivaldszky, 1880
- Duvalius herculis J. Frivaldszky, 1889
- Duvalius hetschkoi (Reitter, 1911)
- Duvalius hickeri Knirsch, 1913
- Duvalius huberi Casale, 2011
- Duvalius huetheri Jeannel, 1934
- Duvalius humerosus Knirsch, 1926
- Duvalius hungaricus Csiki, 1903
- Duvalius hurkai Janak & P. Moravec, 1989
- Duvalius iblis Payerimhoff, 1910
- Duvalius iljukhini Dalzhanski & Ljovuschkin, 1985
- Duvalius iolandae Magrini & Vanni, 1986
- Duvalius iuliae Casale, Giachino, Vailati & Vigna Taglianli, 1996
- Duvalius iulianae Vigna Taglianti & Casale, 1973
- Duvalius joannidisi Casale, Giachino & M. Elonti, 1990
- Duvalius jureceki Dodeno, 1917
- Duvalius jurjurae Peyerimhoff, 1909
- Duvalius kanabei Csiki, 1940
- Duvalius karelhurkai Farkac, 1990
- Duvalius kimakowiczi Ganglbauer, 1891
- Duvalius klimeschi Winkler, 1914
- Duvalius knirschi Janak & P. Monavec, 1989
- Duvalius kodrici Scheibel, 1938
- Duvalius koeni Muilwijk & Felix, 2008
- Duvalius kotelensis Genest, 1978
- Duvalius krueperi Schaum, 1862
- Duvalius kryshanovskii Jeannel, 1962
- Duvalius kurnakovi Jeannel, 1960
- Duvalius kyllenicus Scheibel, 1937
- Duvalius laevigatus Bokor, 1913
- Duvalius laneyriei J. Ochs, 1948
- Duvalius langhofferi Csiki, 1913
- Duvalius lantosquensis Abeille da Perrin, 1881
- Duvalius lapiei Peyerimhoff, 1908
- Duvalius legrandi Genest, 1983
- Duvalius lemairei Giordan & Raffaldi, 1982
- Duvalius lencinai Mateu & Ortuno, 2006
- Duvalius leonhardi Reitter, 1901
- Duvalius lepinensis Cenuti, 1950
- Duvalius lespesii Fairmaire, 1867
- Duvalius longhii Comolli, 1837
- Duvalius lucarellii Casale & Vigna Taglianti, 1990
- Duvalius lucidus J. Muller, 1903
- Duvalius macedonicus J. Muller, 1917
- Duvalius magdelainei Jeannel, 1914
- Duvalius magistrettianus Schatzmayr, 1940
- Duvalius maglajensis Apfelbeck, 1908
- Duvalius maglianoi Giordan & Raffaldi, 1983
- Duvalius maglicensis Winkler, 1933
- Duvalius mallaszii Csiki, 1901
- Duvalius mandibularis Jeannel, 1930
- Duvalius marani Knirsch, 1930
- Duvalius mariannae Knirsch, 1924
- Duvalius marii Vanni, Magrini & Pennisi, 1991
- Duvalius martensi Casale, 1983
- Duvalius martinae Jeanne, 1996
- Duvalius matocqi Giordan, 1987
- Duvalius megrel Belousov, 1992
- Duvalius meixneri Kreissl, 1993
- Duvalius merisioi Casale, Giachino, Vailati & Vigna Taglianti, 1996
- Duvalius merklii J. Frivaldszky, 1877
- Duvalius meschniggi Meixner, 1928
- Duvalius microphthalmus L. Miller, 1859
- Duvalius milenae Casale, 1983
- Duvalius milleri J. Frivaldszky, 1862
- Duvalius minozzii Dodero, 1917
- Duvalius miroshnikovi Belousov & Zamotajlov, 1995
- Duvalius mixanigi Daffner, 1993
- Duvalius moczarskii J. Muller, 1917
- Duvalius mohammadzadehi Muilwijk & Felix, 2008
- Duvalius montisageli Jeannel, 1947
- Duvalius montisoetae Casale, 1987
- Duvalius morisii Vigna Taglianti & Casale, 1973
- Duvalius muelleri Winkler, 1933
- Duvalius muriauxi Jeannel, 1957
- Duvalius nambinensis Boldori, 1935
- Duvalius nannus Jeannel, 1931
- Duvalius neumanni J. Muller, 1911
- Duvalius novaki J. Muller, 1911
- Duvalius occitanus Casale & Vigna Taglianti, 1993
- Duvalius ochsi Dodero, 1921
- Duvalius oertzeni L. Miller, 1884
- Duvalius oltenicus Jeannel, 1928
- Duvalius olympiadicus Scheibel, 1937
- Duvalius onaci Moldovan, 1993
- Duvalius opermanni Scheibel, 1933
- Duvalius oscus A. Franzini & C. Franzini, 1984
- Duvalius ovtshinnikovi Belousov, 1992
- Duvalius panoecus J. Frivaldszky, 1865
- Duvalius papasoffi Mandl, 1942
- Duvalius paroecus J. Frivaldszky, 1865
- Duvalius paulinae (Fagniez, 1922)
- Duvalius pecoudi Jeannel, 1937
- Duvalius pennisii Magrini & Vanni, 1984
- Duvalius peristericus J. Muller, 1914
- Duvalius perrinae Giordan, 1989
- Duvalius petraeus Knirsch, 1927
- Duvalius petrochilosi Coiffait, 1965
- Duvalius philippensis Jeannel, 1937
- Duvalius phoenicius Vigna Taglianti, 1973
- Duvalius pilifer Ganglbauer, 1891
- Duvalius pominii Schatzmayr, 1943
- Duvalius poporogui Decou, 1973
- Duvalius pretneri V.B. Gueorguiev, 1971
- Duvalius proceroides Jeannel, 1926
- Duvalius procerus Putzeys, 1847
- Duvalius pruinosus Jeannel, 1937
- Duvalius putshkovi Belousov & Kabak, 1999
- Duvalius raffaldii Curti, 1981
- Duvalius rajtchevi Genest & Juberthie, 1983
- Duvalius ramorinii (Gestro, 1887)
- Duvalius raymondi Delarouzee, 1859
- Duvalius redtenbacheri I. Frivaldszky von Frivald & J. Frivaldszky, 1857
- Duvalius regisborisi Buresch, 1926
- Duvalius regiszogui Maschnigg, 1936
- Duvalius reiseri Ganglbauer, 1891
- Duvalius reitteri Miller, 1881
- Duvalius richardi Knirsch, 1925
- Duvalius roberti Abeille de Perrin, 1903
- Duvalius roseni Jeannel, 1929
- Duvalius rossii Magrini & Vanni, 1991
- Duvalius roubali Jeannel, 1926
- Duvalius ruffoanus Casale, Giachino, Vailati & Vigna Taglianti, 1996
- Duvalius ruffoi Magistretti, 1956
- Duvalius ruthenus Reitter, 1878
- Duvalius sardous (Dodero, 1917)
- Duvalius saueri Farkac & P. Moravec, 1993
- Duvalius sbordonii Vigna Taglianti, Genest & Sciaky, 1980
- Duvalius scerisorae Knirsch, 1913
- Duvalius schatzmayri J. Muller, 1912
- Duvalius sclanoi Magrini & Vanni, 1996
- Duvalius semecensis Winkler, 1926
- Duvalius sicardi Fagniez, 1923
- Duvalius siculus (Baudi di Selva, 1882)
- Duvalius silvestrii (Gestro, 1896)
- Duvalius simoni (Abeille de Perrin, 1881)
- Duvalius smolikanus Casale, Giachino, Vailati & Vigna Taglianti, 1996
- Duvalius sokolovi Ljovuschkin, 1963
- Duvalius spaethi (Ganglbauer, 1904)
- Duvalius speiseri Ganglbauer, 1892
- Duvalius spiessi Jeannel & Mallasz, 1929
- Duvalius spinifer Jeannel, 1928
- Duvalius springeri (J. Muller, 1921)
- Duvalius stankovitchi Jeannel, 1924
- Duvalius starivlahi B.Gueorguiev, S.Curcic & B.Curcic, 2000
- Duvalius stepanavanensis Iablokoff-Khnzorian, 1963
- Duvalius stilleri Reitter, 1913
- Duvalius stopicensis (Jeannel, 1924)
- Duvalius straneoi Jeannel, 1931
- Duvalius strupii Scheibel, 1937
- Duvalius sturanyi (Apfelbeck, 1904)
- Duvalius styx Apfelbeck, 1904
- Duvalius subterraneus (L. Miller, 1868)
- Duvalius sydowi Jeannel, 1930
- Duvalius szaboi Csiki, 1914
- Duvalius sziladyi Csiki, 1904
- Duvalius taygetanus Casale, 1979
- Duvalius transcarpathicus Shilenkov & Rizun, 1989
- Duvalius trescavicensis Ganglbauer, 1891
- Duvalius turcati Giordan & Raffaldi, 1983
- Duvalius vallombrosus (C. & F. Rasetti, 1920)
- Duvalius vannii Magrini & Sclano, 1998
- Duvalius vartashensis Belousov, 1989
- Duvalius vermionensis (Casale, 1983)
- Duvalius vignai Casale, 1983
- Duvalius villiersi Giordan & Raffaldi, 1983
- Duvalius virginiae Magnini, Vanni & Cirocchi, 1996
- Duvalius voitestii Jeannel, 1930
- Duvalius volscus A. Franzini & G. Franzini, 1984
- Duvalius voraginis Jeannel & J. Ochs, 1938
- Duvalius vranensis Breit, 1904
- Duvalius waillyi Giordan & Raffaldi, 1982
- Duvalius weiratheri Scheibel, 1937
- Duvalius wercharatskii Rizun & Yanitskiy, 1994
- Duvalius wichmanni Jeannel, 1929
- Duvalius wingelmuelleri (Ganglbauer, 1904)
- Duvalius winkleri Jeannel, 1924
- Duvalius winklerianus Jeannel, 1926
- Duvalius winneguthi Apfelbeck, 1907
- Duvalius yatsenkokhmelevskyi Iablokoff-Khnzorian, 1960
- Duvalius zaimisi Jeannel, 1929
- Duvalius zivkovi (Knirsch, 1925)
- Duvalius zlatiborensis (Curcic, Brajkovic & Curcic, 2005)
