= George Wyman Bury =

G. Wyman Bury (3 January 1874 – 23 September 1920) was a naturalist, explorer, author, Arabist, and political officer in the British army.

Born in Mancetter Manor House near the town of Atherstone, Bury was educated at Atherstone Grammar School and then by tutors ("Army crammers") who specialized in preparing students for the examinations that were part of Army Officer Selection. In 1894 he received a commission in the 3rd Battalion Royal Warwickshire Regiment. In 1895 Bury joined one of the rebel tribes in southern Morocco. In 1896 in the Aden littoral desert, he worked in archaeology and natural history, as well as intelligence gathering among the mountain tribes of Aden. From 1897 to 1901 he explored in the Rub' al Khali. In 1902 he was with the Aden Boundary Commission. In 1903–1904 he was engaged as a political officer in military operations in the Aden Protectorate. As an explorer and naturalist, Bury was a member of: in 1905–1906 a zoological expedition in Somaliland, in 1908–1909 southern Arabian peninsula exploration, and in 1912–1913 Yemen highlands exploration. He was in special service in Egypt in 1914 and served on the intelligence staff on the Suez Canal front in 1915. He became a political officer in the Red Sea Northern Patrol and was given in 1915 the rank of lieutenant in the Royal Navy Volunteer Reserve. In the first half of 1916 he participated in naval operations along the Arabian coast and was involved with the successful revolt led by Hussein bin Ali, Sharif of Mecca.

He met his future wife, Florence Ann Marshall, in 1911 when he was a tuberculosis patient in Westminster Hospital and she was his nurse. On 19 June 1913, they married in Hodeida, Yemen. In July 1916 he was sent on convalescent leave to live in Cairo under the care of his wife. At the end of World War I, Bury and his wife went to live in Helwan, where he died in 1920 from tuberculosis.

== Eponyms ==
- Latastia boscai burii
- Myriopholis burii – Arabian blind snake (or Bury's worm snake)
- Sylvia buryi – Yemen warbler

== Selected publications ==
- The Land of Uz. London: Macmillan. 1911.
- Arabia Infelix. London: Macmillan. 1915.
- Pan-Islam. London: Macmillan. 1919.
