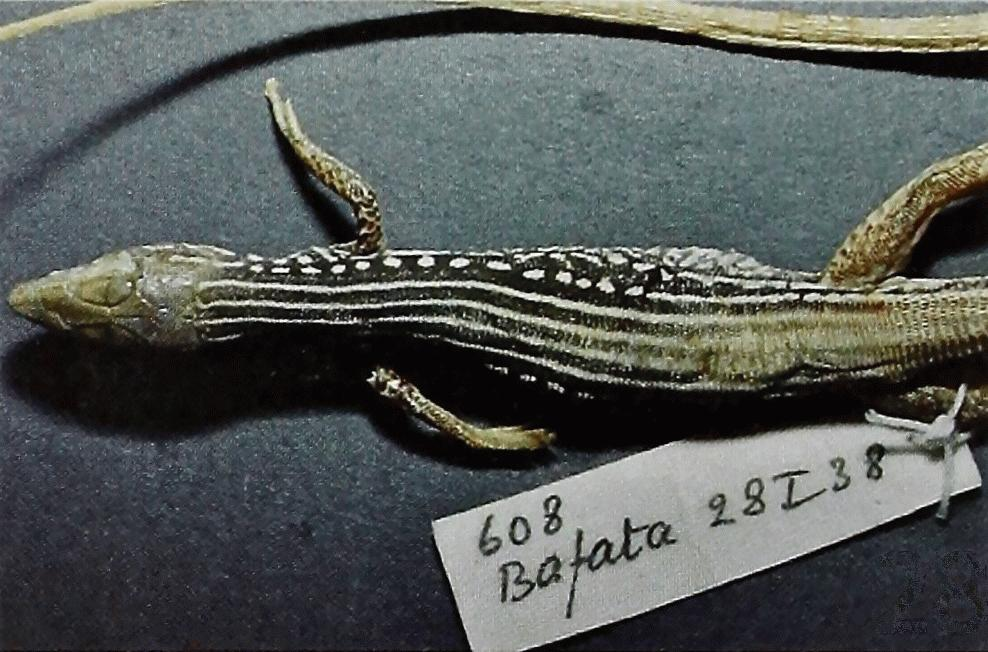

Conservation status
- Data Deficient (IUCN 3.1)

Scientific classification
- Kingdom: Animalia
- Phylum: Chordata
- Class: Reptilia
- Order: Squamata
- Suborder: Lacertoidea
- Family: Lacertidae
- Genus: Latastia
- Species: L. ornata

Binomial name
- Latastia ornata Monard, 1940

= Latastia ornata =

Species of lizard

Latastia ornata is a species of lizard endemic to Guinea-Bissau.
