= Latastia doriai =

Conservation status
- Least Concern (IUCN 3.1)

Scientific classification
- Kingdom: Animalia
- Phylum: Chordata
- Class: Reptilia
- Order: Squamata
- Family: Lacertidae
- Genus: Latastia
- Species: L. doriai

Binomial name
- Latastia doriai Bedriaga, 1884

Species of lizard

Latastia doriai, also known commonly as Doria's long-tailed lizard, is a species of lizard in the family Lacertidae. The species is endemic to the Horn of Africa. There are three recognized subspecies.

== Geographic range ==
L. doriai is found in Djibouti, Eritrea, Ethiopia, and Somalia.

== Habitat ==
The preferred natural habitat of L. doriai is shrubland, at altitudes from sea level to 1,800 m (5,900 ft).

== Subspecies ==
Including the nominotypical subspecies, three subspecies are recognized as being valid.

- Latastia doriai doriai Bedriaga, 1884
- Latastia doriai martensi Bedriaga, 1884
- Latastia doriai scortecci Arillo, Balletto & Spanò, 1967

== Etymology ==
The specific name, doriai, is in honor of Italian zoologist Giacomo Doria.

The subspecific name, martensi, is in honor of German zoologist Eduard von Martens.

The subspecific name, scorteccii, is in honor of Italian herpetologist Giuseppe Scortecci.

== Reproduction ==
L. doriai is oviparous.
