= Giacomo Doria =

Italian naturalist, botanist, herpetologist, and politician

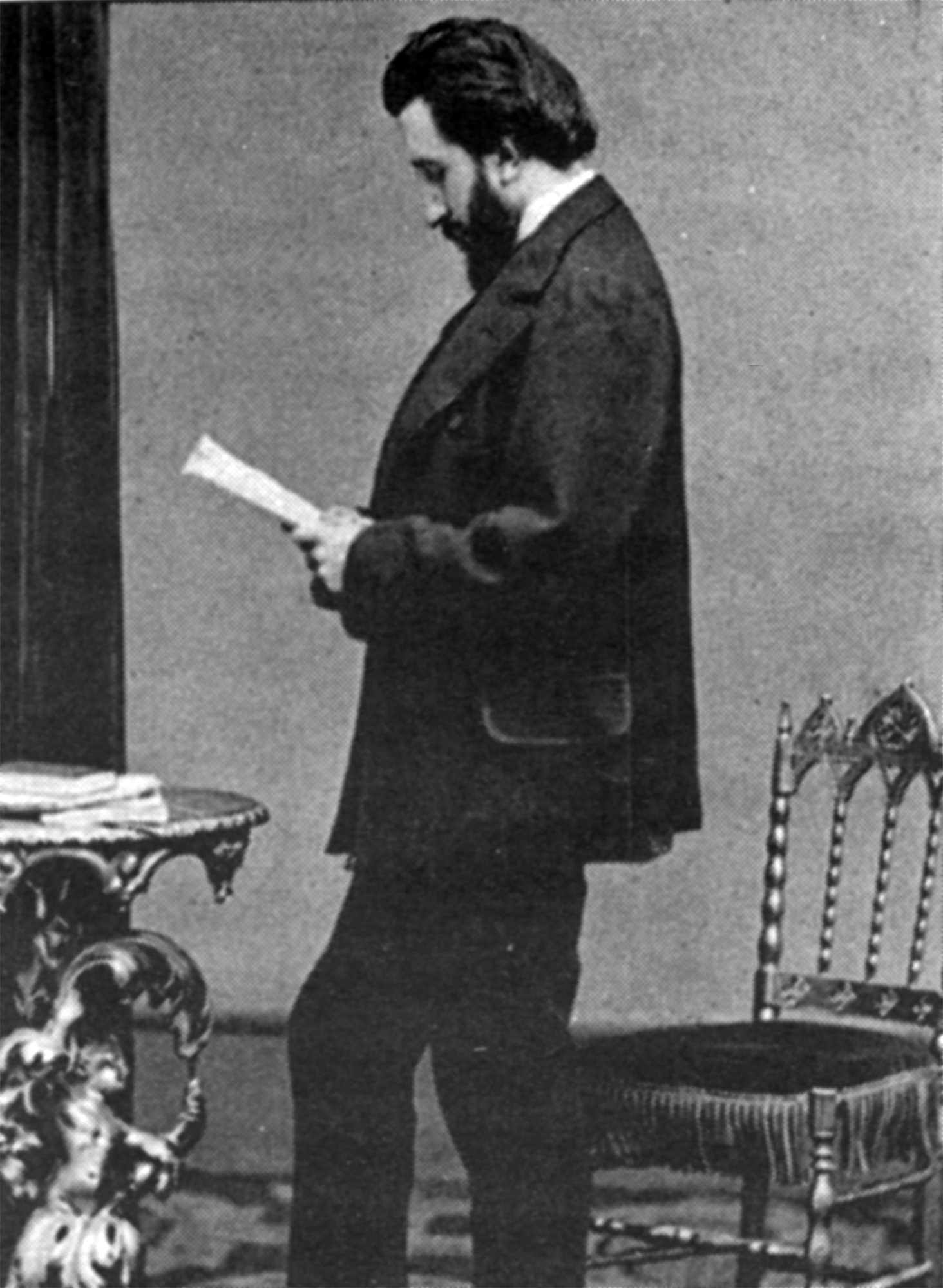
- Giacomo Doria
- Born: 1 November 1840; La Spezia
- Died: 19 September 1913 (aged 72); Borzoli (Genova)
- Scientific career
- Fields: naturalist

Marquis Giacomo Doria (1 November 1840 – 19 September 1913) was an Italian naturalist, botanist, herpetologist, and politician.

He was the founder of the Museo Civico di Storia Naturale in Genoa in 1867, and director from then until his death. It is now named for him as the Natural History Museum of Giacomo Doria.

He collected numerous samples of plants, shells, butterflies, other insects and various animals in Persia with Filippo de Filippi (1862–63), in Sarawak with Odoardo Beccari (1865–66), in the Red Sea (1879-1880) and in Tunisia (1881).

He was an avid entomologist. In 1891 he was elected President of the Royal Italian Geographical Society.

In the scientific field of herpetology, he described many new species of amphibians and reptiles, including several he described with Wilhelm Peters. He is commemorated in the scientific names of eight reptiles: Agama doriae, Ptyas doriae, Gonocephalus doriae, Homalophis doriae, Latastia doriai, Scincella doriae, Stenodactylus doriae, and Tropidonophis doriae.

Some other animals are named after him, Doria's tree kangaroo (Dendrolagus dorianus), Doria's goshawk (Megatriorchis doriae), Doria's cave beetle (Duvalius doriae), yellow Iranian scorpion (Odontobuthus doriae), Doria's frog (Limnonectes doriae), Doria's slug (Limax doriae), a species of harvestman (Nelima doriae), various species of weevils (Asytesta doriae, Hoplopisthius doriae, Rhinoscapha doriai and others).

In 1891, the Italian explorer Vittorio Bottego named the main tributary of the Jubba River after Doria, which is now called Ganale Doria River.

He was also mayor of Genoa for a few months in 1891.
