= Exclusive economic zone of Somalia =

Maritime boundary

The exclusive economic zone of Somalia

The exclusive economic zone of Somalia covers 830,389 km^{2} in the Indian Ocean. It extends to a distance of 200 nautical miles from the baselines, from which the breadth of the nation's territorial waters is measured. In accordance with Law No. 37 passed in 1972, Somalia's EEZ falls under its territorial sovereignty.

== Legislation ==
=== Law No. 37 on the Territorial Sea and Ports ===
On 10 September 1972, the Parliament of Somalia passed Law No. 37 on the Territorial Sea and Ports. The bill extended Somalia's territorial sea to 200 nautical miles within the continental and insular coasts. On 26 January 1989, the parliament passed legislation Law. 05, which approved the Somali Maritime Law (the Somali Maritime Law of 1988). The bill provides for a 200 nm territorial sea and exclusive economic zone.

=== United Nations Convention on the Law of the Sea ===
On 9 February 1989, the Somali parliament ratified the United Nations Convention on the Law of the Sea (UNCLOS). The treaty defines the rights and responsibilities of nations with respect to their use of the world's oceans, and establishes guidelines for businesses, the environment, and the management of marine Natural resources. The 1982 UNCLOS provides for a territorial sea of up to 12 nm and an EEZ of up to 200 nm. It also provides for the possibility of an extended continental shelf extending up to 350 nm from shore, depending on the characteristics of the seabed adjacent to the coast.

=== Somali Maritime Law ===
On 30 June 2014, President of Somalia Hasan Sheikh Mohamud outlined the exclusive economic zone of Somalia in relation to the Somali Maritime Law of 1988 passed by the Somali parliament. It stipulates that the Federal Republic of Somalia has:

Sovereign rights for the purpose of exploring and exploiting, conserving and managing the natural resources, whether living or non-living, of the seabed and subsoil and the superjacent waters, and with regard to other activities for the economic exploration and exploitation of the zone, such as the production of energy from water, currents and winds.

== Delineation ==
In August 2014, the Federal Government of Somalia formally asked the International Court of Justice "to determine, on the basis of international law, the complete course of the single maritime boundary dividing all the maritime areas appertaining to Somalia and to Kenya in the Indian Ocean."

== Natural resources ==
Somalia has the longest coastline on mainland Africa, and some of the continent's richest fish stocks. The abundance in fisheries in the area is a result of the coastal upwelling of cold nutrient-rich subsurface oceanic waters. The upwelling results in the enrichment of phytoplankton and zooplankton, which, in turn, make the conditions favorable for some small pelagic fish such as sardines, herring, and scad.

== See also ==
- Geography of Somalia
- Somali current
- Agriculture in Somalia
- Constitution of Somalia
