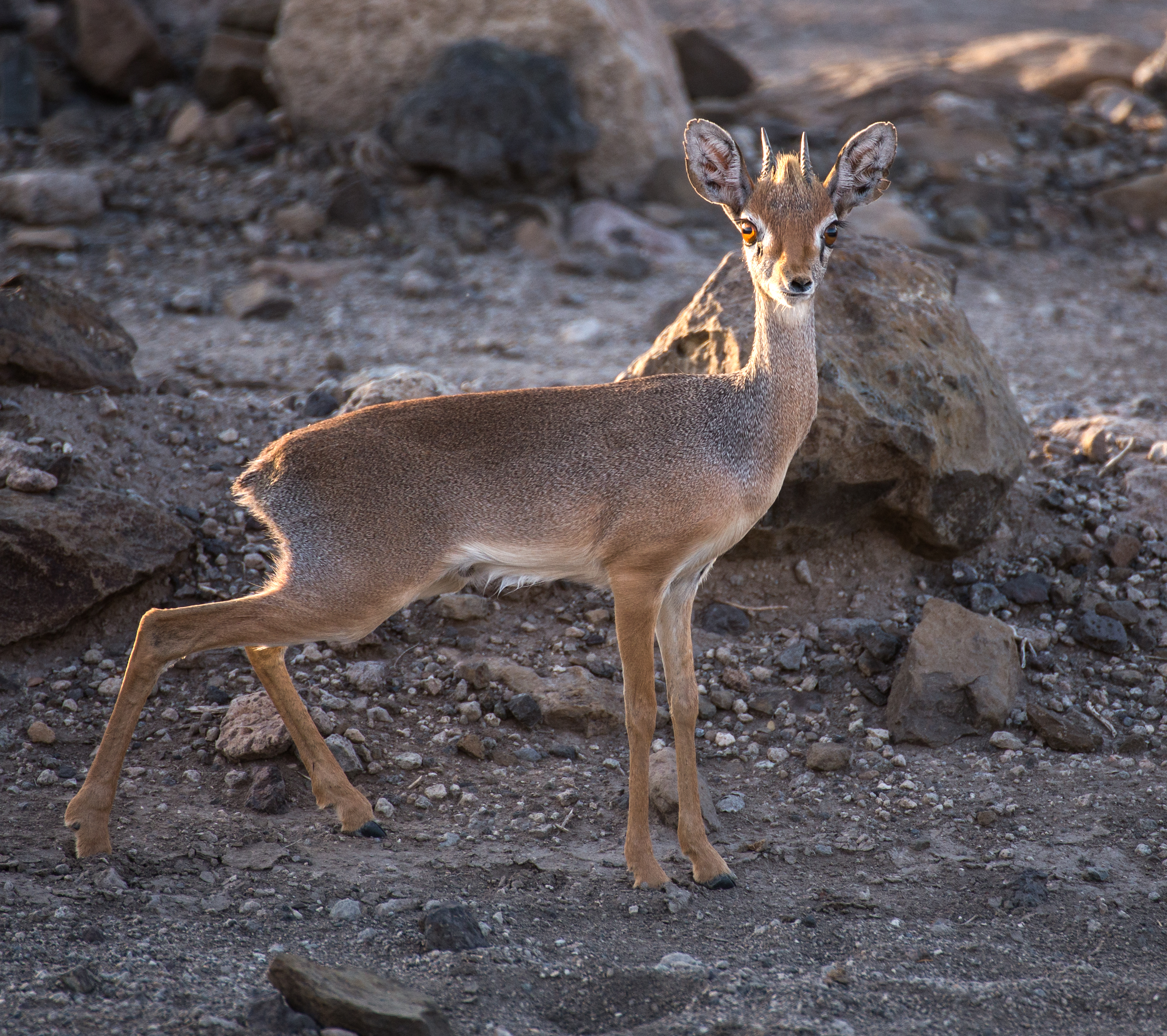
- Salt's dik-dik in the wild of Africa

Conservation status
- Least Concern (IUCN 3.1)

Scientific classification
- Kingdom: Animalia
- Phylum: Chordata
- Class: Mammalia
- Infraclass: Placentalia
- Order: Artiodactyla
- Family: Bovidae
- Subfamily: Antilopinae
- Genus: Madoqua
- Species: M. saltiana

Binomial name
- Madoqua saltiana (de Blainville, 1816)
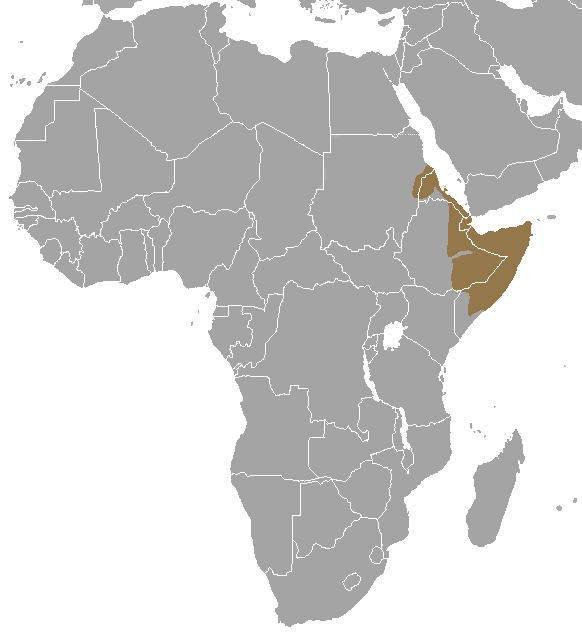
- The range of Salt's dik-dik

= Salt's dik-dik =

Species of mammal

Salt's dik-dik (Madoqua saltiana) is a small antelope found in semidesert, bushland, and thickets in the Horn of Africa, but marginally also in northern Kenya and eastern Sudan. It is named after Henry Salt, who was the first European to acknowledge the species in Abyssinia in the early 19th century.

== Description ==
Salt's dik-diks are 52–67 cm (20–26 in) long, 33–41 cm (13–16 in) high, and weigh 2.5–4.0 kg (5.5–8.8 lb). As in other dik-diks, the small, pointed horns are only present in the male. Their colour varies significantly depending on the subspecies.

== Taxonomy ==
Together with the closely related silver dik-dik, this species forms the subgenus Madoqua in the genus Madoqua (other dik-diks are also in the genus Madoqua, but the subgenus Rhynchotragus). The taxonomy of this subgenus is complex and a matter of dispute. Today, the most widely used treatment is based on a review in 1978, but a significantly different treatment was presented in a review in 1972. Following the review in 1978, the silver dik-dik is treated as a separate monotypic species, and Salt's dik-dik has five subspecies:

- M. s. saltiana is found from northern Ethiopia to Eritrea and far eastern Sudan, and is relatively large with a reddish-grey back.
- M. s. hararensis is found in the Hararghe region in eastern Ethiopia, and has a gingery back and dark red flanks.
- M. s. lawrenci is found in eastern and southeastern Somalia, and has a silvery back and russet flanks.
- M. s. phillipsi is found in Somaliland, and its back is grey and flanks are orange.
- M. s. swaynei is found in the Jubba Valley region of southern Ethiopia, southern Somalia, and far northern Kenya; its back is brown-grey.

In 2003, each of the above was proposed to represent an evolutionary species, but as of 2016, most maintain them as subspecies. The review in 1972 differed significantly from the above. Under that treatment, three species are recognized in the subgenus Madoqua: Salt's sik-dik (M. saltiana with the subspecies saltiana and cordeauxi), Phillip's dik-dik (M. phillipsi with the subspecies phillipsi, gubanensis, hararensis, and lawrencei), and Swayne's dik-dik (M. swaynei with the subspecies swaynei, erlangeri, and piancentinii). Of these taxa, M. s. cordeauxi, M. p. gubanensis, and M. p. erlangeri were considered entirely invalid in 1978.

== Behavior ==
Salt's dik-diks are shy animals. They are active at night and dusk to avoid the midday heat, and are considered crepuscular. Dominant dik-diks flare their crests. The animals are most often found in pairs and small groups, and Salt's dik-diks mainly eat leaves and shoots of acacia trees. Due to ecological factors, Salt's dik-diks have a considerably lower basal metabolic rate than other ruminants that inhabit temperate and cold climates.

== Reproduction ==
The gestation period lasts approximately 150 –180 days. Female dik-diks give birth to 1 cub twice a year. The newborn is hidden in the nesting area for at least 2–3 weeks. After 1 week, an infant is able to eat solid food. However, it continues to nurse for 3–4 months. After the first month of life, young males begin to grow their horns. Salt's dik-dik reaches adult size after 8 months and stops growing completely after 12 months. As soon as the young dik-dik reaches sexual maturity (6–9 months), it establishes a territory with a mate.
