= Alula Lagoon =

- Location within Somalia
- Location: Bari, Somalia
- Coordinates: 11°59′N 50°47′E
- Type: natural saltwater lagoon
- Ocean/sea sources: Indian Ocean
- Basin countries: Somalia
- Max. length: 4.13 miles (6.65 km)
- Max. width: 0.78 miles (1.26 km)
- Surface area: 3 km^{2} (1.2 sq mi)
- Islands: many islands and islets
- Settlements: Alula

Alula Lagoon is a large shallow lagoon in the northeastern Bari region of Puntland state of Somalia. The northernmost point in the country, it is mostly covered with mangroves.

== Overview ==
Facing the Gulf of Aden, the lagoonal mangrove lies behind a barrier island. It is located northeast of Alula, the northernmost town in Somalia. The lagoon is surrounded by mangrove bushes, and appears to correspond with the "large laurel-grove called Acannae" described by the 1st century CE Periplus of the Erythraean Sea.

Rhizophora mucronata and Avicennia marina are the predominant mangrove species found in the lagoon.
