= Ana Sofia Reboleira =

Portuguese biologist and speleologist

Ana Sofia Pereira Serrenho Reboleira (born 6 October 1980 in Caldas da Rainha) is a Portuguese biologist and speleologist, best known for her discovery of over 70 species of flora and fauna, and the description of 17 new taxa, and for her exploration work at the Krubera Cave.
