= Adolph Reuss =

German-American physician and zoologist

- Born: November 28, 1804; Frankfurt am Main
- Died: May 7, 1878 (aged 73)
- Education: University of Göttingen
- Occupations: physician zoologist
- Organization: Senckenbergische Naturforschende Gesellschaft

Adolph Reuss (November 28, 1804, in Frankfurt am Main – May 7, 1878) was a German-American medical doctor and zoologist, known for his work in the fields of herpetology and arachnology.

He studied at the University of Göttingen, earning his medical doctorate in 1825. Following graduation, he served as a doctor in Frankfurt, also becoming involved with zoological research at the Senckenberg Museum. He later emigrated to the United States, where in 1834, he purchased a 200 acre farm near Shiloh, Illinois. In rural Illinois, he worked as a farmer, and in meantime, maintained a successful medical practice. At the time of his death, his estate had grown in size to 450 acres of land.

Since 1829, he was a member of the Senckenbergische Naturforschende Gesellschaft, and in September 1856, he became a corresponding member of the Academy of Sciences of St. Louis. While serving at the Senckenberg Museum in Frankfurt, he edited a collection of manuscripts in the field of arachnology that was a catalyst towards the first Senckenberg publication (Museum Senckenbergianum).

He described a number of herpetological species, such as Enhydris alternans, sometimes referred to as "Reuss' water snake".

== Publications ==
- "Dissertatio inauguralis anatomico-physiologica de systemate lentis crysallinae [sic] humanae", 1825 (dissertation).
- Zoologische Miscellen. Reptilien. Ophidier, 1833 - Zoological miscellany; Reptiles, snakes.
- Zoologische Miscellen : Arachniden, 1834 - Zoological miscellany; Arachnids.
- Zoologische Miscellen / Saurier, Batrachier Museum senckenbergianum, 1834 - Zoological miscellany; Lizards, amphibians.
