= Haackgreerius =

Conservation status
- Data Deficient (IUCN 3.1)

Scientific classification
- Kingdom: Animalia
- Phylum: Chordata
- Class: Reptilia
- Order: Squamata
- Family: Scincidae
- Genus: Haackgreerius; Lanza, 1983
- Species: H. miopus

Binomial name
- Haackgreerius miopus (Greer & Haacke), 1982

Synonyms
- Lygosoma miopus Greer & Haacke, 1982; Haackgreerius miopus — Lanza, 1983

Genus of lizards

Haackgreerius is a genus of skink, a lizard in the family Scincidae. The genus Haackgreerius is endemic to coastal Somalia and contains one species.

== Etymology ==
The generic name, Haackgreerius, is in honor of South African herpetologist Wulf Dietrich Haacke and Australian herpetologist Allen E. Greer.

== Geographic range ==
The genus Haackgreerius is endemic to coastal Somalia.

== Species ==
The genus Haackgreerius is monotypic, containing a single species, Haackgreerius miopus.

== Habitat ==
The preferred natural habitat of H. miopus is shrubland.

== Description ==
The eye of H. miopus is vestigial and is covered by an undifferentiated ocular scale. The front legs are absent, but hind legs are present. Each hind foot has only two toes.

== Reproduction ==
The mode of reproduction of H. miopus is unknown.
