= Silver dik-dik =

Conservation status
- Data Deficient (IUCN 3.1)

Scientific classification
- Kingdom: Animalia
- Phylum: Chordata
- Class: Mammalia
- Infraclass: Placentalia
- Order: Artiodactyla
- Family: Bovidae
- Subfamily: Antilopinae
- Genus: Madoqua
- Species: M. piacentinii

Binomial name
- Madoqua piacentinii Drake-Brockman, 1911
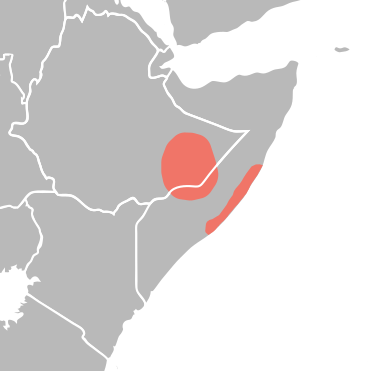
- Madoqua piacentinii distribution

Species of mammal

The silver dik-dik (Madoqua piacentinii) is a small antelope found in low, dense thickets along the southeastern coast of Somalia and in Acacia-Commiphora bushland in the Shebelle Valley in southeastern Ethiopia. It is the smallest species of dik-dik, with a length of 45–50 cm (18–20 in), a height of 30–33 cm (12–13 in), and a weight of 2–3 kg (4.4–6.6 lb). Its back and flanks are grizzled silvery, while the limbs, ears, and muzzle are ochraceus in colour. Little is known about its status, but numbers are believed to be decreasing.

Together with the closely related Salt's dik-dik, this species forms the subgenus Madoqua in the genus Madoqua (other dik-diks are also in the genus Madoqua, but the subgenus Rhynchotragus). The taxonomy of this subgenus is complex and a matter of dispute. Though most recent authorities treat the silver dik-dik as a monotypic species, the silver dik-dik has been suggested as a subspecies of Swayne's dik-dik (itself now usually treated as a subspecies of Salt's dik-dik).
