= Latastia cherchii =

Conservation status
- Least Concern (IUCN 3.1)

Scientific classification
- Kingdom: Animalia
- Phylum: Chordata
- Class: Reptilia
- Order: Squamata
- Family: Lacertidae
- Genus: Latastia
- Species: L. cherchii

Binomial name
- Latastia cherchii Arillo, Balletto & Spanò, 1967

Species of lizard

Latastia cherchii is a species of lizard in the family Lacertidae. The species is endemic to Somalia.

== Etymology ==
The specific name, cherchii, is in honor of Italian herpetologist Maria Adelaide Cherchi.

== Geographic range ==
L. cherchii is found in central Somalia.

== Habitat ==
The preferred natural habitat of L. cherchii is desert.

== Reproduction ==
L. cherchii is oviparous.
