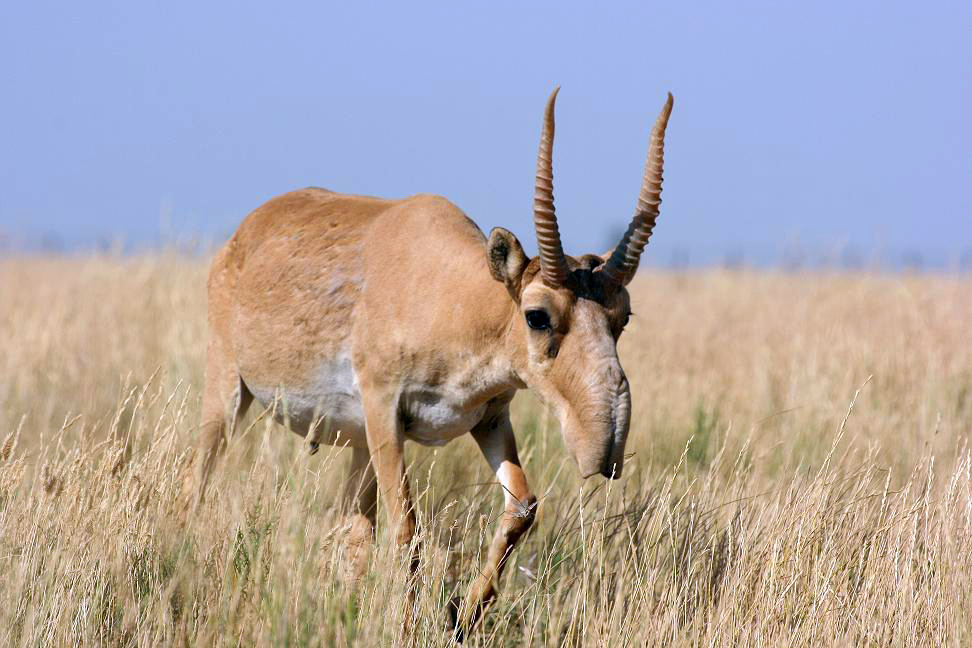
- Saiga tatarica male

Scientific classification
- Kingdom: Animalia
- Phylum: Chordata
- Class: Mammalia
- Order: Artiodactyla
- Family: Bovidae
- Subfamily: Antilopinae
- Tribe: Saigini; Simpson, 1945

Genera
- see text

= Saigini =

Tribe of mammals

Saigini is a tribe of artiodactyl mammals of the Bovidae family, subfamily Antilopinae, comprising two species of medium-sized antelopes that inhabit the Eurasian steppes.

== Taxonomy ==
=== Description ===
The tribe was created in 1945 by the American paleontologist and theoretical biologist George Gaylord Simpson. According to the Simpson classification the tribe comprises two monospecific genera:

- Tribus Saigini
  - Genus Pantholops
    - Pantholops hodgsonii
  - Genus Saiga
    - Saiga tatarica

=== A controversial taxonomy ===
Saiga and Pantholops are problematic genera in taxonomy. Saiga was traditionally classified as a member of the tribe Saigini, within the subfamily Caprinae but some authors suggested that the genus Saiga was closer to the subfamily Antilopinae. In 2000 Groves analyzed the morphological characters of Procapra, Prodorcas and Saiga, and proposed three basal groups of Antilopinae, one of which included a clade Saiga + Procapra.

The genus Pantholops is monotypic (P. hodgsonii), and is sometimes included in the tribe Saigini on the basis of similar morphological features, most of which are plesiomorphic. However, molecular and morphological findings suggest that Pantholops hodgsonii should be classified more correctly in the subfamily Caprinae, but the status of the Tibetan gazelle in this subfamily remains uncertain. Data gathered in the 1990s on cytochrome b and small portions of 12S and 16S ribosomal genes suggested phylogenetic affinities of Saiga and Procapra with Antilopinae. However, these studies did not clarify the close relationships within this clade. Given this uncertainty, some authors suggested that the Saigini taxon should be abandoned. Genetic studies in the 21st century supported this idea, placing the saiga with the gazelles in the Antilopini tribe.
