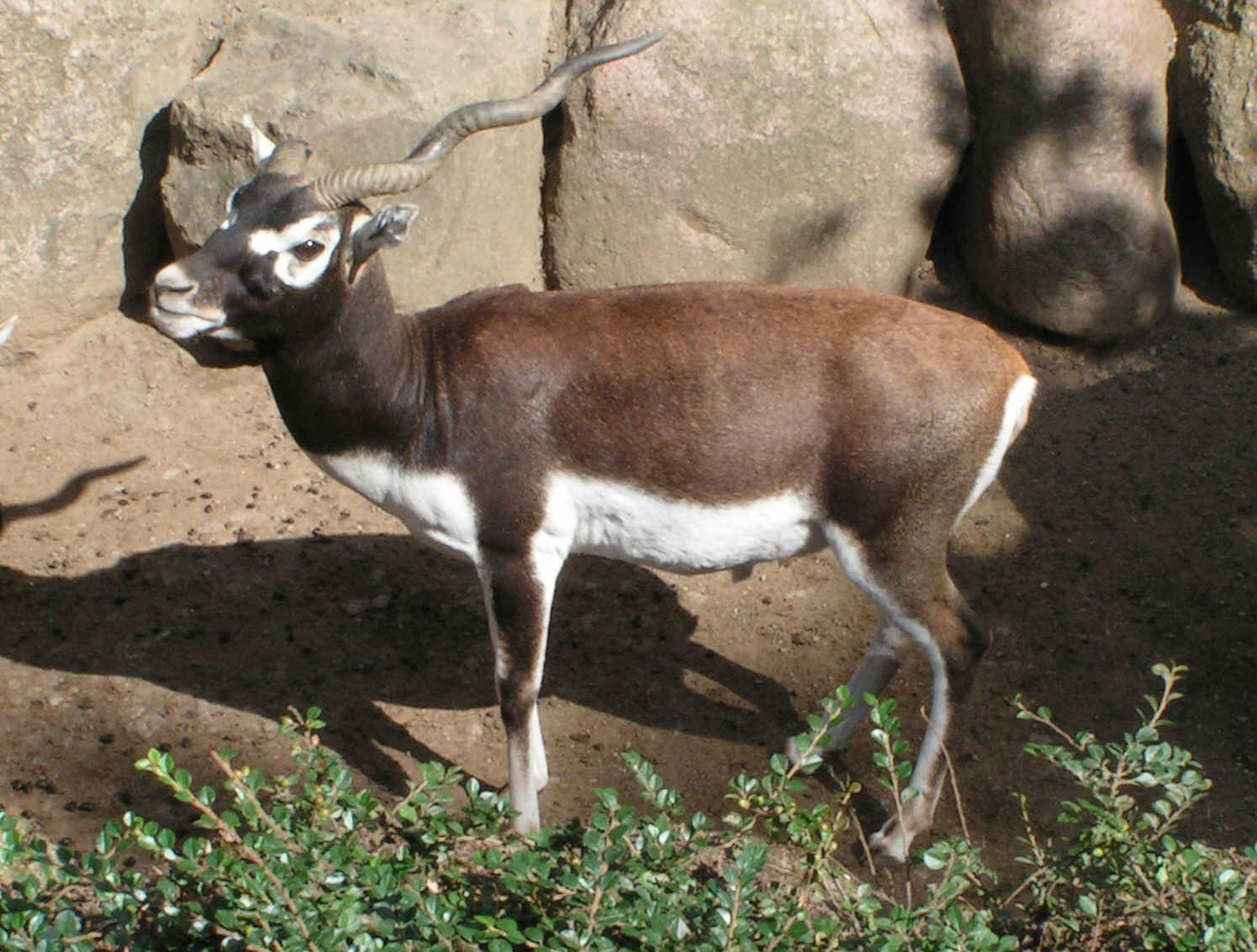
- Mature male Indian blackbuck (Antilope cervicapra)

Scientific classification
- Kingdom: Animalia
- Phylum: Chordata
- Class: Mammalia
- Order: Artiodactyla
- Family: Bovidae
- Subfamily: Antilopinae; Gray, 1821

Genera
- See text

= Antilopinae =

Subfamily of mammals

Antilopinae is a subfamily of even-toed ungulates in the family Bovidae. The members of tribe Antilopini are often referred to as true antelopes, and include the gazelles, blackbucks, springboks, gerenuks, dibatags, and Central Asian gazelles. True antelopes occur in much of Africa and Asia, with the highest concentration of species occurring in East Africa in Sudan, Eritrea, Ethiopia, Somalia, Kenya, and Tanzania. The saiga (tribe Saigini) inhabits Central and Western Asia, mostly in regions from the Tibetan Plateau and north of the Indian subcontinent. The dwarf antelope species of tribe Neotragini live entirely in sub-Saharan Africa.

== Classification ==
Family Bovidae

- Subfamily Antilopinae
  - Tribe Antilopini
    - Genus Ammodorcas
      - Dibatag Ammodorcas clarkei
    - Genus Antidorcas
      - Springbok Antidorcas marsupialis
    - Genus Antilope
      - Blackbuck Antilope cervicapra
    - Genus Boselaphus
      - Nilgai Boselaphus tragocamelus
    - Genus Eudorcas
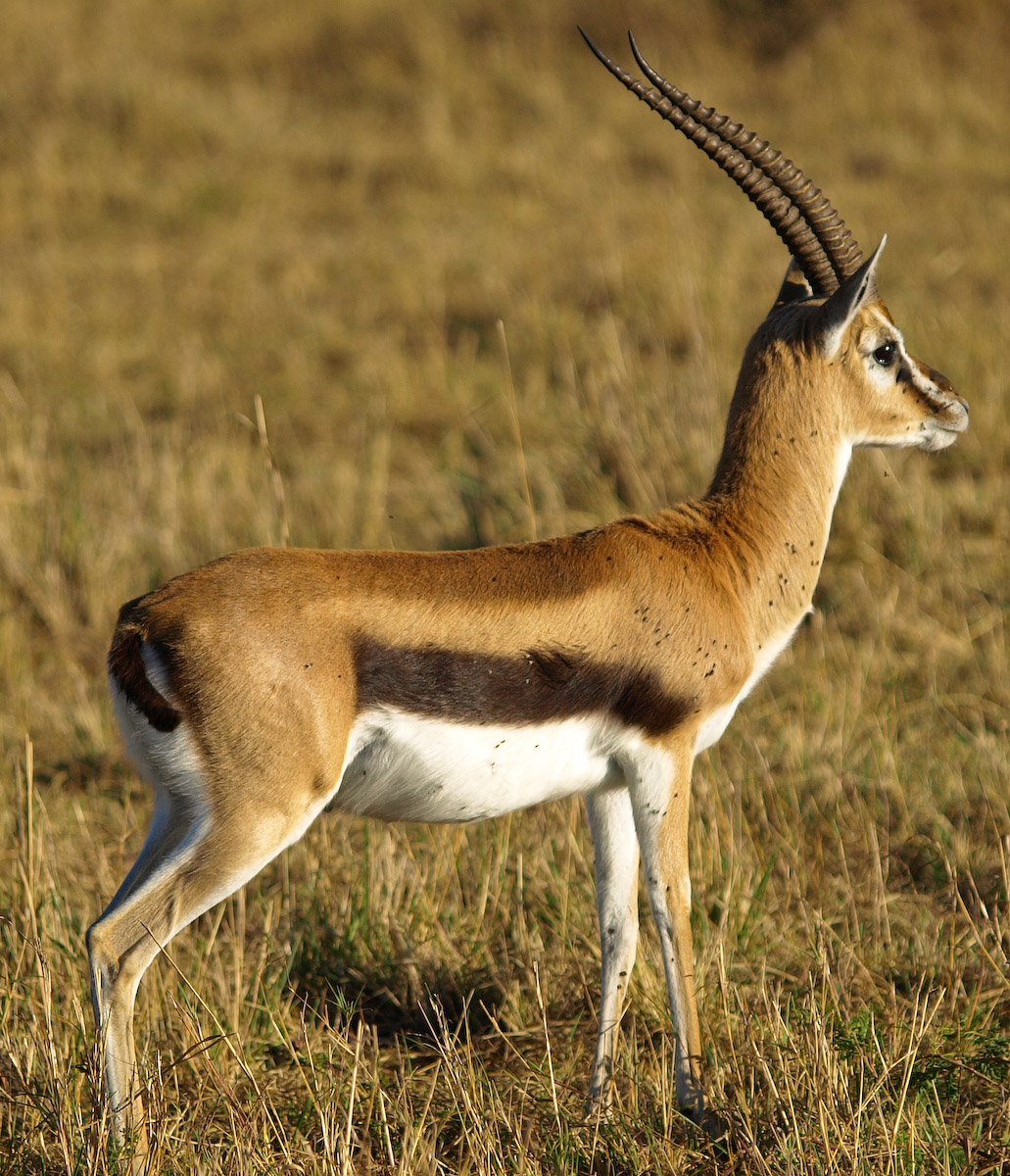
      Thomson's gazelle (Eudorcas thomsoni)
      - Mongalla gazelle Eudorcas albonotata
      - Red gazelle Eudorcas rufina †
      - Red-fronted gazelle Eudorcas rufifrons
      - Thomson's gazelle Eudorcas thomsonii
      - Heuglin's gazelle Eudorcas tilonura
    - Genus Gazella
      - Subgenus Deprezia
        - Gazella psolea †
      - Subgenus Gazella
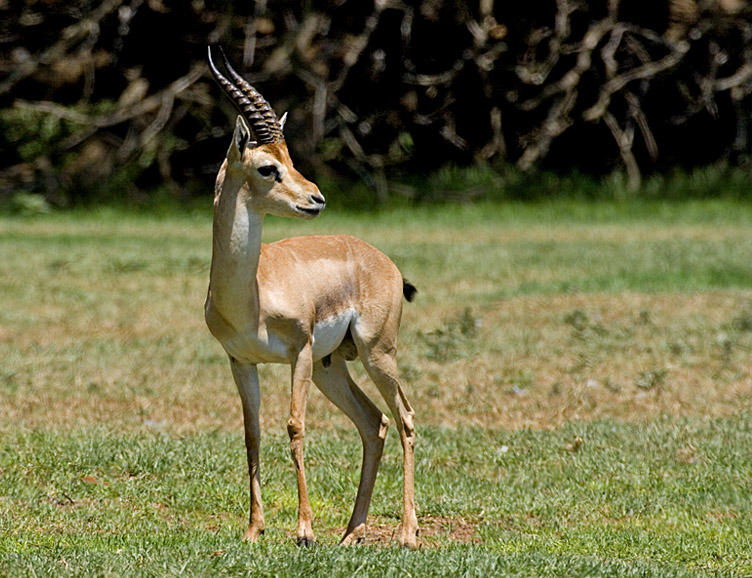
        Mountain gazelle (Gazella gazella)
        - Arabian gazelle Gazella arabica
        - European gazelle Gazella borbonica †
        - Chinkara or Indian gazelle Gazella bennettii
        - Queen of Sheba's gazelle Gazella bilkis †
        - Dorcas gazelle Gazella dorcas
        - Mountain gazelle Gazella gazella
        - Saudi gazelle Gazella saudiya †
        - Speke's gazelle Gazella spekei
      - Subgenus Trachelocele
        - Cuvier's gazelle Gazella cuvieri
        - Rhim gazelle or slender-horned gazelle Gazella leptoceros
        - Sand gazelle Gazella marica
        - Goitered gazelle Gazella subgutturosa
    - Genus Litocranius
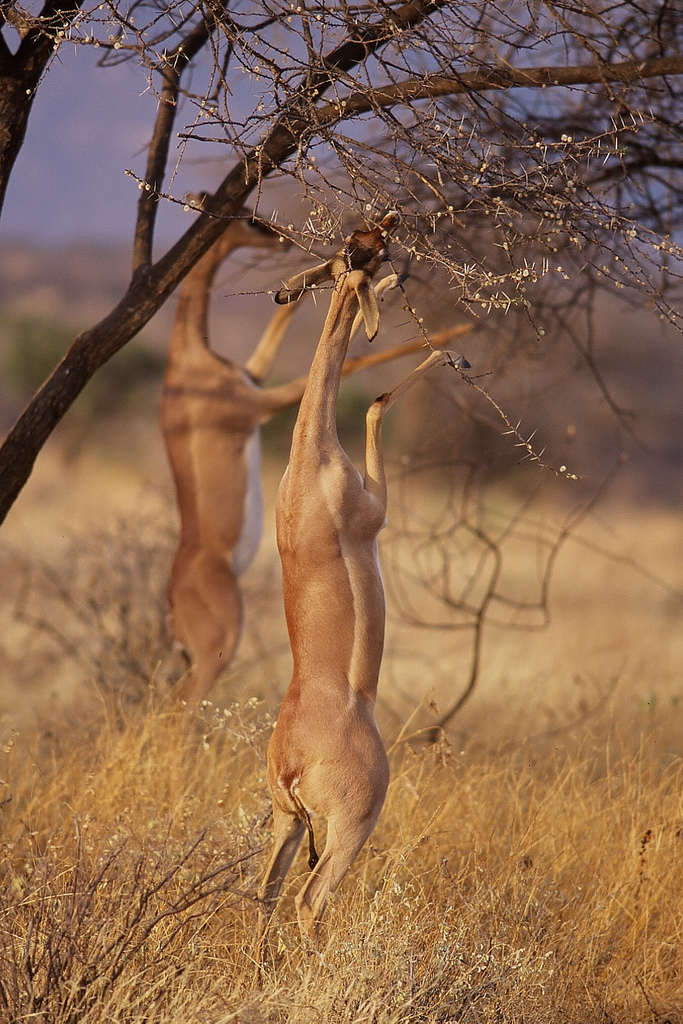
      Gerenuk (Litocranius walleri)
      - Gerenuk Litocranius walleri
    - Genus Nanger
      - Dama gazelle Nanger dama
      - Grant's gazelle Nanger granti
      - Bright’s gazelle Nanger notata
      - Peter’s gazelle Nanger petersii
      - Soemmerring's gazelle Nanger soemmerringii
    - Genus Procapra
      - Zeren Procapra gutturosa
      - Goa Procapra picticaudata
      - Przewalski's gazelle Procapra przewalskii
    - Genus Spiraliscornis †
      - Spiraliscornis inopinata †
  - Tribe Saigini
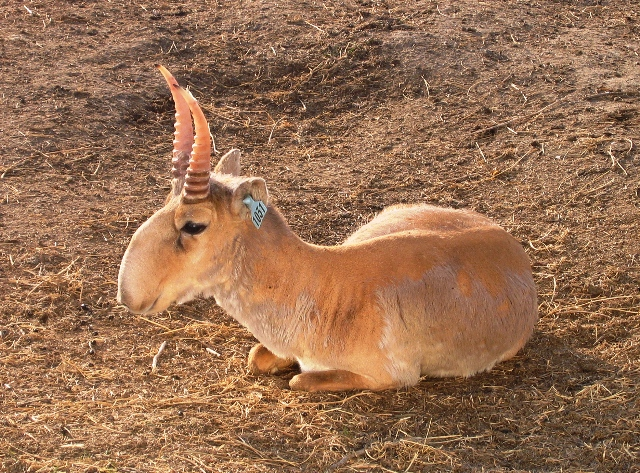
    Saiga (Saiga tatarica)
    - Genus Saiga
      - Saiga Saiga tatarica
  - Tribe Neotragini
    - Genus Dorcatragus
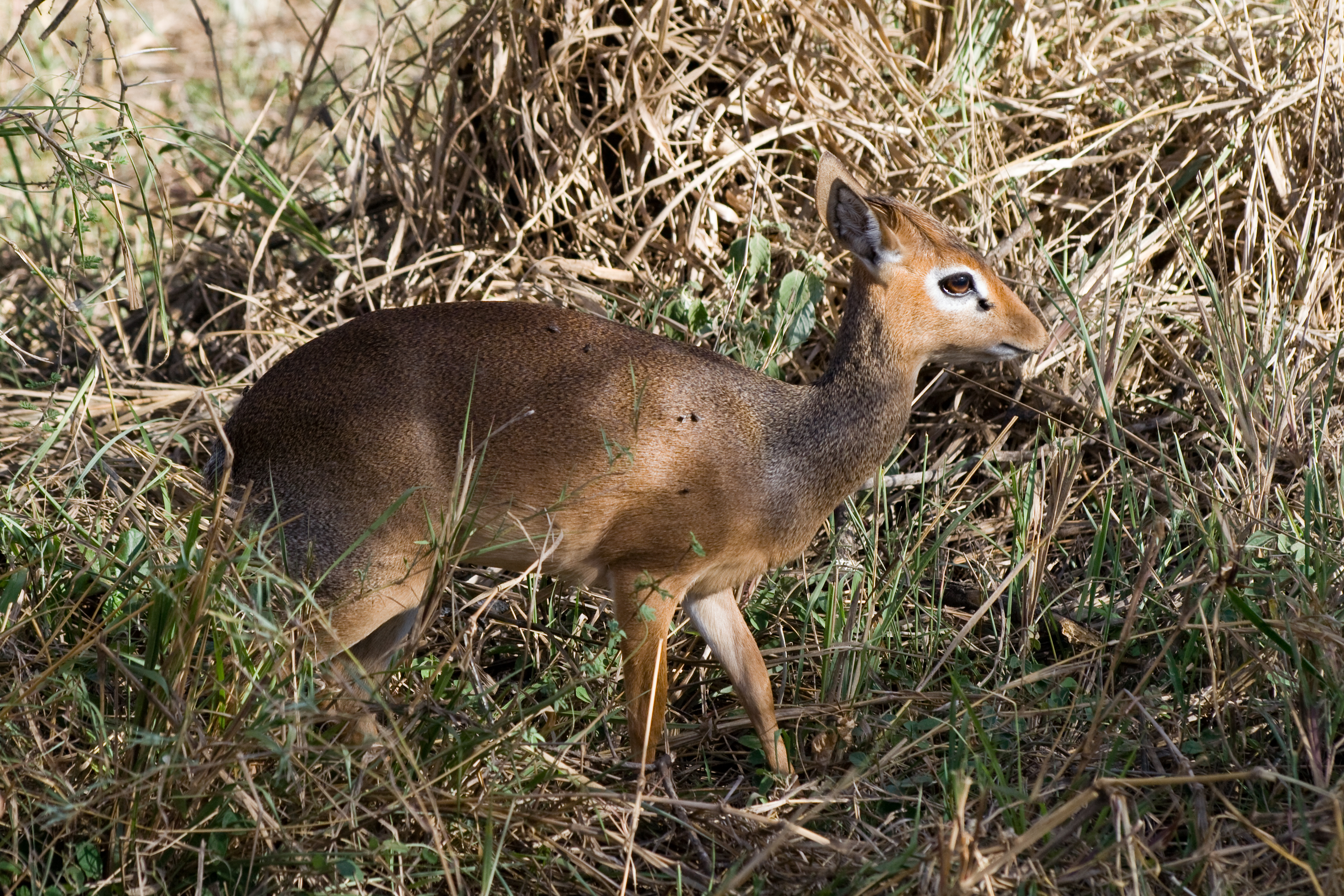
      Kirk's dik-dik (Madoqua kirkii)
      - Beira Dorcatragus megalotis
    - Genus Madoqua
      - Günther's dik-dik Madoqua guntheri
      - Kirk's dik-dik Madoqua kirkii
      - Silver dik-dik Madoqua piacentinii
      - Salt's dik-dik Madoqua saltiana
    - Genus Neotragus
      - Royal antelope Neotragus pygmaeus
    - Genus Ourebia
      - Oribi Ourebia ourebi
    - Genus Raphicerus
      - Steenbok Raphicerus campestris
      - Cape grysbok Raphicerus melanotis
      - Sharpe's grysbok Raphicerus sharpei

Fossil genera

- †Chinjikeros
- †Demecquenemia
- †Deprezia
- †Dytikodorcas
- †Gazellospira
- †Hispanodorcas
- †Homoiodorcas
- †Majoreas
- †Nisidorcas
- †Ouzocerus
- †Parantidorcas
- †Parastrepsiceros
- †Praemadoqua
- †Prostrepsiceros
- †Sinapodorcas
- †Tyrrhenotragus
