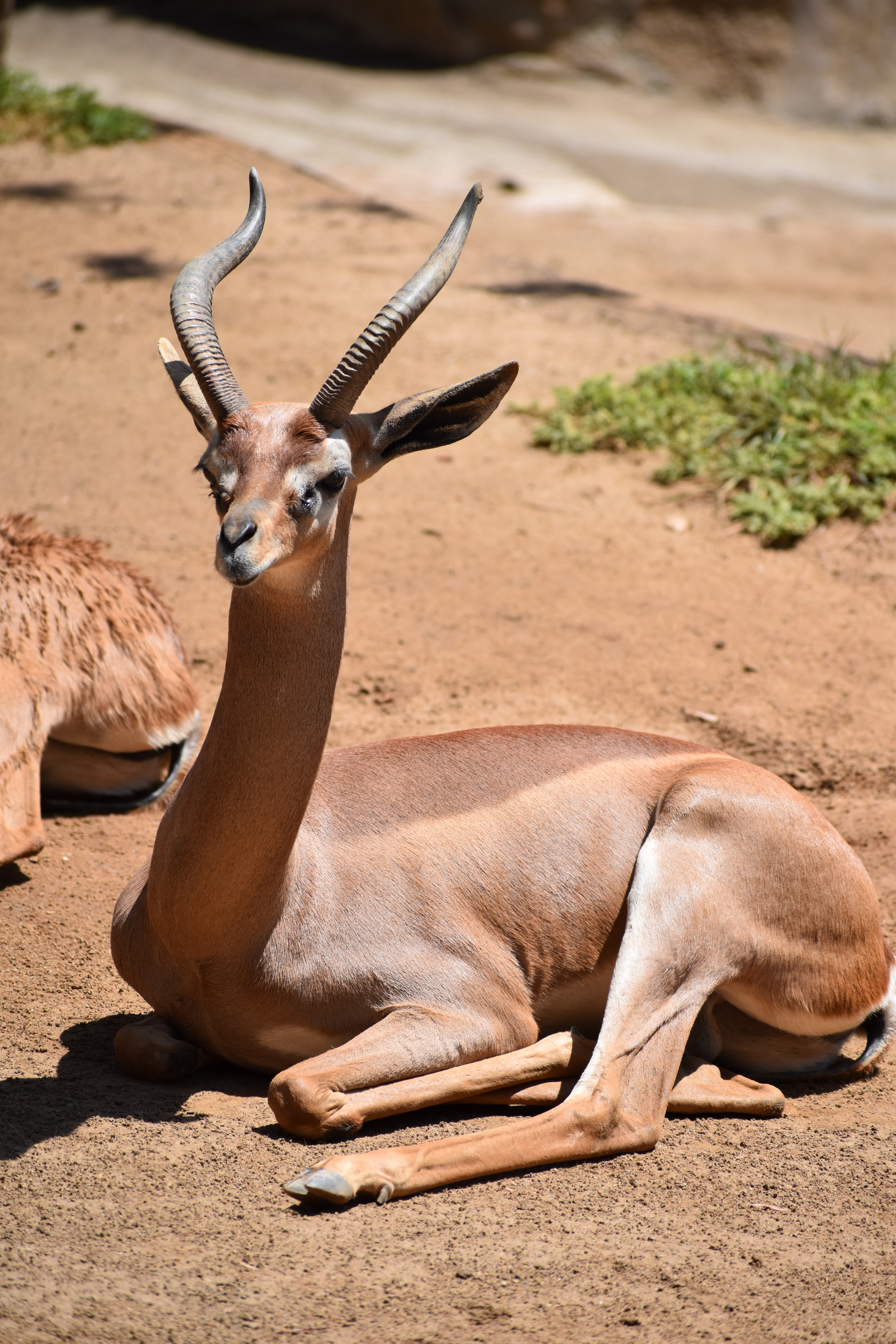
- Male
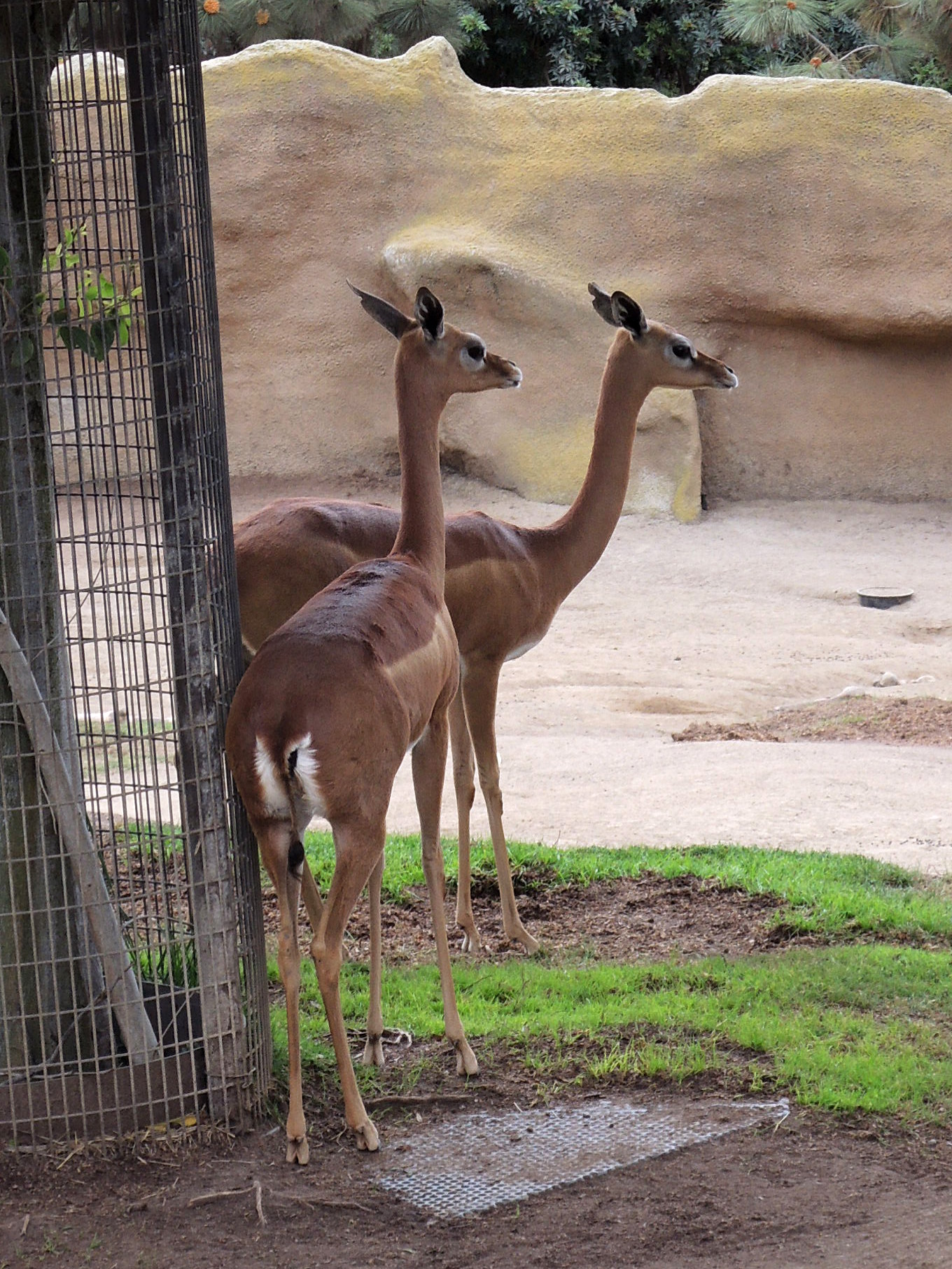
- Two female gerenuk in the San Diego Zoo

Conservation status
- Near Threatened (IUCN 3.1)

Scientific classification
- Kingdom: Animalia
- Phylum: Chordata
- Class: Mammalia
- Order: Artiodactyla
- Family: Bovidae
- Subfamily: Antilopinae
- Tribe: Antilopini
- Genus: Litocranius; Kohl, 1886
- Species: L. walleri

Binomial name
- Litocranius walleri (Brooke, 1879)
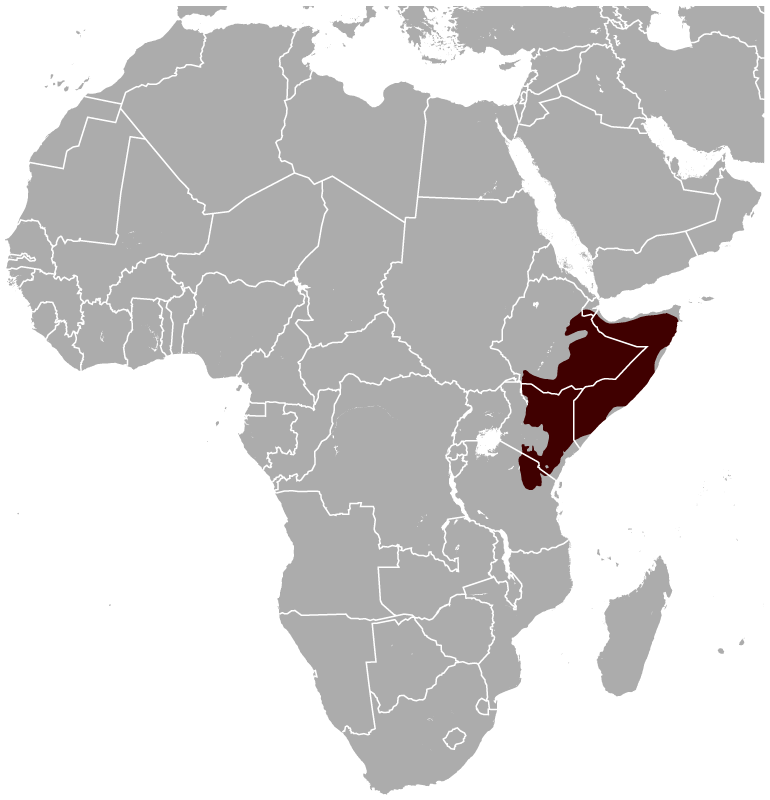
- distribution of gerenuk (2008)

Synonyms
- Gazella walleri (Brooke, 1879); Lithocranius walleri Thomas, 1891

= Gerenuk =

Long-necked species of antelope

The gerenuk (Note: Pronounced /ˈɡɛrɪnʊk, ɡəˈrɛnək/ GHERR-in-uuk, gə-REN-ək; Somali: garanuug.) (Litocranius walleri), also known as the giraffe gazelle, is a long-necked, medium-sized antelope found mainly in the Somali region of East Africa. The sole member of the genus Litocranius, the gerenuk was first described by naturalist Victor Brooke in 1879. It is characterised by its long, slender neck and limbs. The antelope is 80–105 centimetres (2 feet 7 inches – 3 feet 5 inches) tall, and weighs between 18 and 52 kg (40 and 115 lb). Two types of colouration are clearly visible on the smooth coat, the reddish brown back or the "saddle" and the lighter flanks of fawn to buff. The horns, present only on males, are lyre-shaped. Curving backward then slightly forward, these measure 25–44 cm (10–17 1/2 in).

== Taxonomy and phylogeny ==
The gerenuk was first described by Victor Brooke in 1879 on the basis of three male specimens procured on "the mainland of Africa, north of the island of Zanzibar". Brooke used the scientific name Gazella walleri, on the request of Gerald Waller (who provided the specimens) to name it after his deceased brother. The type locality was later corrected by John Kirk, who originally obtained the specimens on the "coast near the River Juba in southern Somalia" before giving them to Waller. In 1886, Franz Friedrich Kohl proposed a new genus for the gerenuk, Litocranius. The common name derives from the Somali name for the animal (gáránúug); the first recorded use of the name dates back to 1895. It is also known as the "giraffe gazelle" due to its similarity to the giraffe.

Two subspecies have been proposed, but these are considered to be independent species by some authors.

- L. w. sclateri (Northern gerenuk or Sclater's gazelle) Neumann, 1899: Its range extends from northwestern Somalia (Berbera District) westward to touch the Ethiopian border and Djibouti.
- L. w. walleri (Southern gerenuk or Waller's gazelle) (Brooke, 1879): Its range extends through northeastern Tanzania through Kenya to Galcaio (Somalia). The range lies north of the Shebelle River and near Juba River.

In 1997 Colin Groves proposed that Litocranius is a sister taxon of the similarly long-necked dibatag (Ammodorcas clarkei), but withdrew from this in 2000. A 1999 phylogenetic study based on cytochrome b and cytochrome c oxidase subunit III analysis showed that the tribe Antilopini, to which the gerenuk belongs, is monophyletic. In 2013, Eva Verena Bärmann and colleagues (of the University of Cambridge) revised the phylogeny of tribe on the basis of nuclear and mitochondrial gene analysis. The cladogram prepared by them (given below) showed that the springbok (Antidorcas marsupialis) forms a clade with the gerenuk; this clade is sister to the saiga (Saiga tatarica, tribe Saigini) and the genera Antilope (blackbuck), Eudorcas, Gazella and Nanger (of Antilopini).

- - - - - - - Gazella
            - Blackbuck (Antilope cervicapra)
          - - Eudorcas
            - Nanger
        - - Gerenuk (Litocranius walleri)
          - Springbok (Antidorcas marsupialis)
      - Saiga (Saiga tatarica)
    - Oribi (Ourebia ourebi)

== Description ==
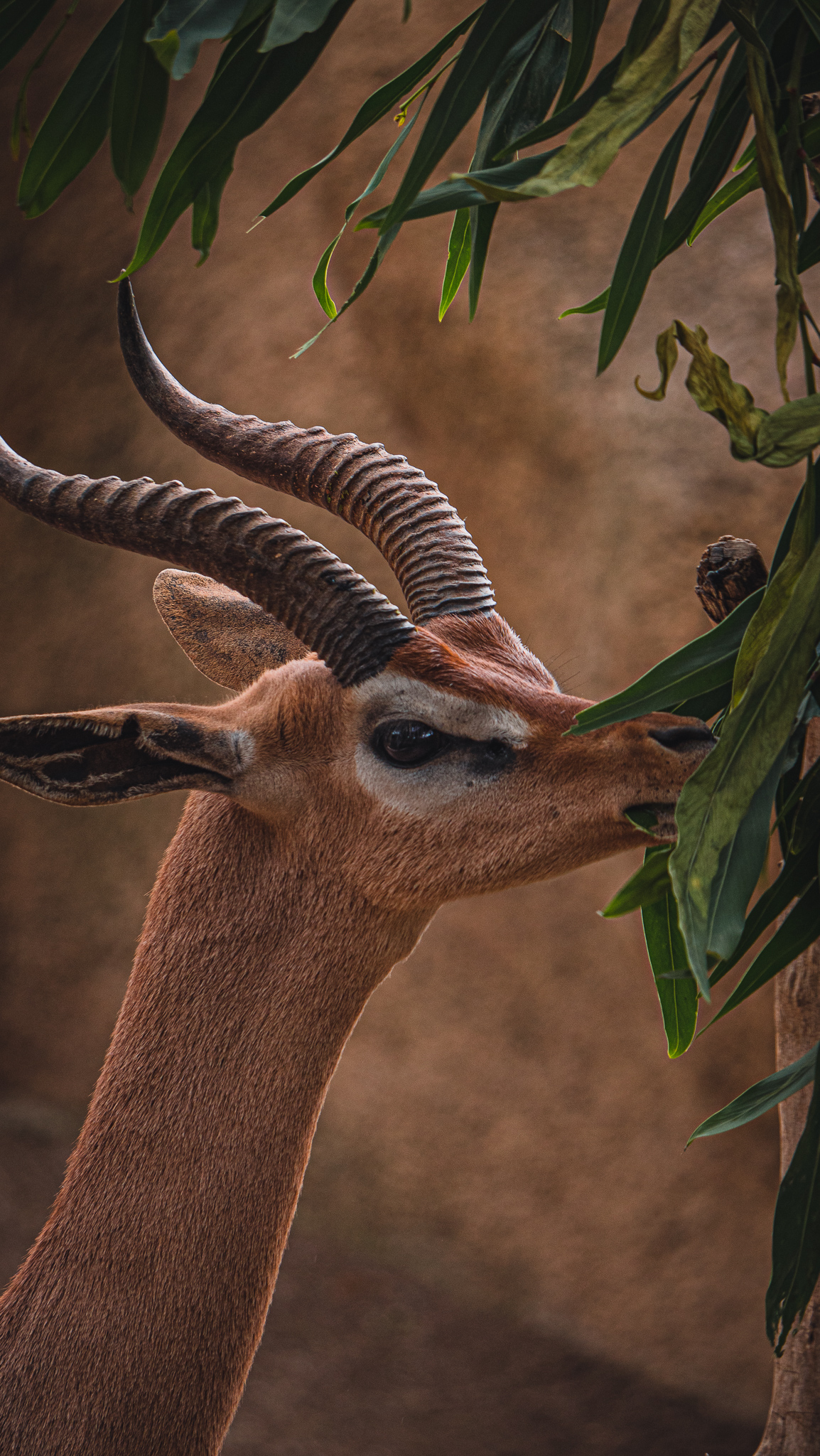
Close-up view of a male. Note the white facial markings and the lyre-shaped horns.

The gerenuk is a notably tall, slender antelope that resembles gazelles. It is characterised by its long, slender neck and limbs, the flat, wedge-like head and the large, round eyes. Males are nearly 89–105 cm (35–41 1/2 in) tall, and the shorter females 80–100 cm (31–39 in); the head-and-body length is typically between 140 and 160 cm (55 and 63 in). Males weigh between 31 and 52 kg (68 and 115 lb); females are lighter, weighing 28–45 kg (62–99 lb). The species is sexually dimorphic. The tail, that ends in a black tuft, measures 25–35 cm (10–14 in).

Two types of colouration are clearly visible on the smooth coat: the reddish brown dorsal parts (the back or the "saddle"), and the lighter flanks, fawn to buff. The underbelly and insides of the legs are cream in colour. The eyes and the mouth are surrounded by white fur. Females have a dark patch on the crown. The horns, present only on males, are lyre-like (S-shaped). Curving backward then slightly forward, these measure 25–44 cm (10–17 1/2 in).

The gerenuk resembles the dibatag, with which it is sympatric in eastern and central Somalia and southeastern Ethiopia. Both are brachyodonts and share several facial and cranial features, along with a two-tone colouration of the coat and strong thick horns (only in males). However, there are also some features that distinguish the dibatag from the gerenuk, including major morphological differences in horns, horn cores, tail, postorbital area and basioccipital processes. The gerenuk has a longer, heavier neck and a shorter tail. A finer point of difference is the absence of an inward-curving lobe in the lower edge of the ear (near its tip) in the gerenuk. The subspecies of the gerenuk are similar in colouration; the southern gerenuk is the smaller of the two. The Gerenuk stages of growth have a timespan from 4 months to 2.5 years: at four months, their shoulder height is about two-thirds of adult female, at six months their shoulder height is about three-quarters of adult female, at eight months their horn tips are clearly visible (about 1cm long), at one year their shoulder height is nearly equal to adult female but body more lightly built, their horns are slightly less than half ear-length, then curve, at two years their horns are about 1.5 times their ear length and the second curve becomes noticeable with the tips turning forwards, and finally at two and a half years the double curve in the horns are nearly completed.

== Ecology and behavior ==
The gerenuk is a diurnal animal (active mainly during the day), though it typically stands or rests in shade during the noon. Foraging and feeding is the major activity throughout the day; females appear to spend more time feeding. The gerenuk may expose itself to rain, probably to cool its body. The social structure consists of small herds of two to six members. Herds typically comprise members of a single sex, though female herds additionally have juveniles. Some males lead a solitary life.

Fighting and travel are uncommon, possibly as a strategy to save energy for foraging. Both sexes maintain home ranges 3–6 km^{2} (1–2 1/2 sq mi) large, and might overlap. Those of males are scent-marked with preorbital gland secretions and guarded - hence these may be termed territories. The sedentary tendency of the antelope appears to increase with age.

== Diet ==
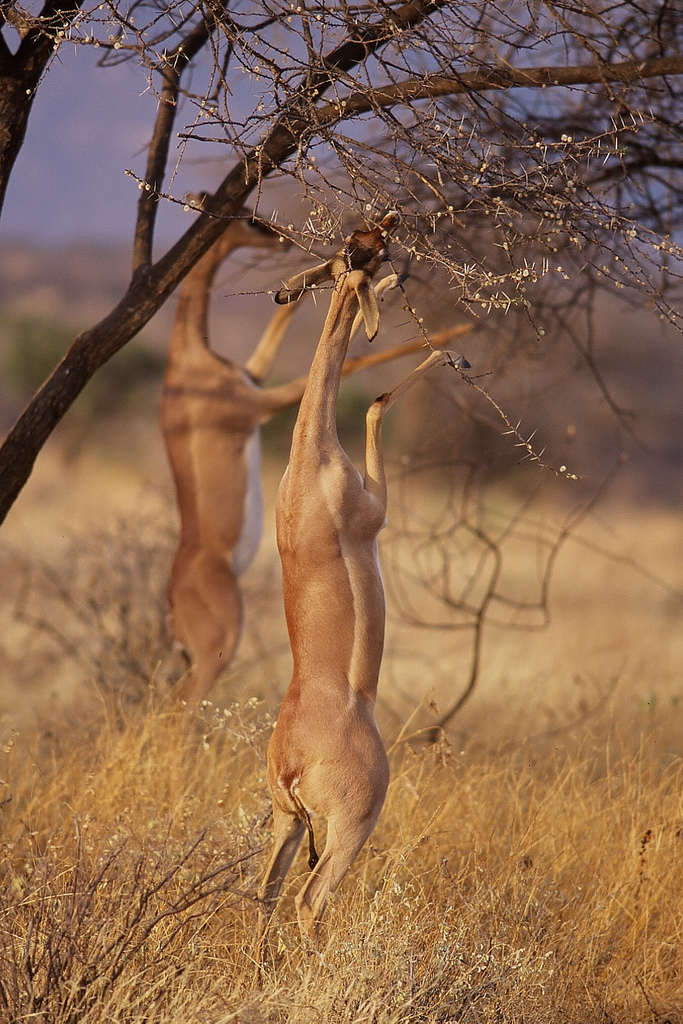
Gerenuks feeding

Primarily a browser, the gerenuk feed on foliage of bushes as well as trees, shoots, herbs, flowers and fruits. It can reach higher branches and twigs better than other gazelles and antelopes by standing erect on its hindlegs and elongating its neck; this helps it reach over 2 m (6 ft 7 in) above the ground. Acacia species are eaten whenever available, while evergreen vegetation forms the diet during droughts. The pointed mouth assists in extracting leaves from thorny vegetation. The gerenuk does not drink water regularly. Major predators of the antelope include African wild dogs, cheetahs, hyenas, lions and leopards.

== Reproduction ==
Gerenuk reproduce throughout the year. Females reach sexual maturity at around one year, and males reach sexual maturity at 1.5 years, although in the wild they may only be successful after acquiring a territory (perhaps 3.5 years). The gestation period is about seven months. They are born one at a time, weighing about 3 kg (7 lb) at birth. Offspring were produced through artificial insemination for the first time in 2010 at White Oak Conservation in Yulee, Florida. Four female calves were born, and one of the four was later inseminated successfully by White Oak and SEZARC (South-East Zoo Alliance for Reproduction & Conservation), creating a second generation of calves born from artificial insemination. Gerenuk can live thirteen years or more in captivity, and at least eight years in the wild.
