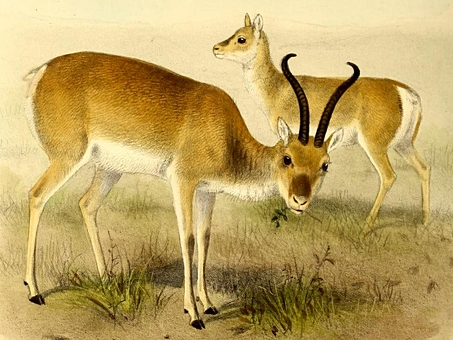
- Illustration by Philip Sclater in 1894

Conservation status
- Endangered (IUCN 3.1)

Scientific classification
- Kingdom: Animalia
- Phylum: Chordata
- Class: Mammalia
- Order: Artiodactyla
- Family: Bovidae
- Subfamily: Antilopinae
- Genus: Procapra
- Species: P. przewalskii

Binomial name
- Procapra przewalskii Büchner, 1891

= Przewalski's gazelle =

Species of mammal

Przewalski's gazelle (Procapra przewalskii) is a member of the family Bovidae, and in the wild, is found only in China. Once widespread, its range has declined to six populations near Qinghai Lake. The gazelle was named after Nikolai Przhevalsky, a Russian explorer who collected a specimen and brought it back to St. Petersburg in 1875.

== Description ==
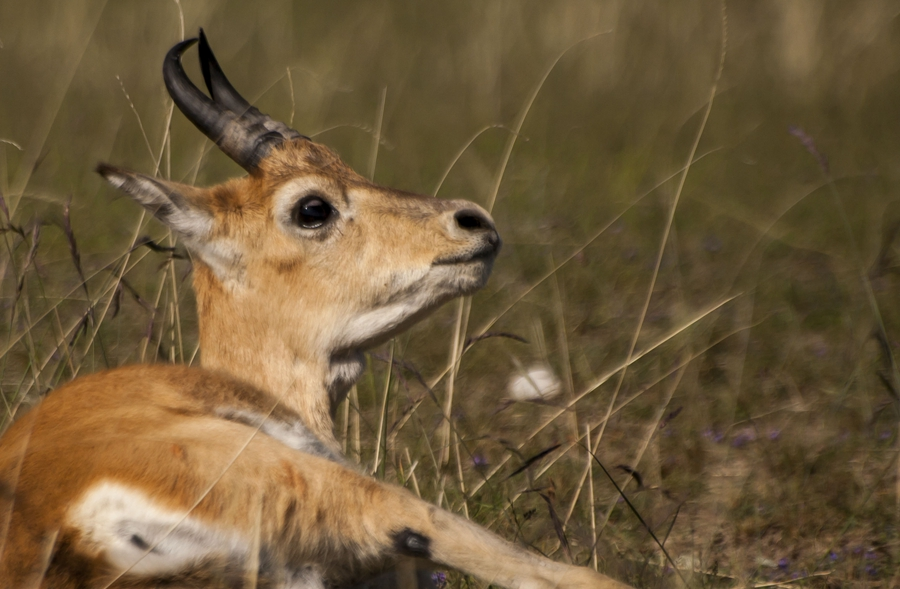
Male Przewalski's gazelle

Przewalski's gazelles are relatively small, slender antelopes with large eyes and short, pointed ears. The nasal bones are relatively large, suggesting an adaptation to the thin air of the Tibetan plateau. They have a head and body length of 109 to 160 cm (43 to 63 in), a shoulder height of 50 to 70 cm (20 to 28 in), and weigh between 17 and 32 kg (37 and 71 lb). Males are generally larger and heavier than the females. The tail is short, measuring only 7 to 10 cm (2.8 to 3.9 in), and is often entirely hidden by fur.

The animal is yellowish brown with a white underside and a white heart-shaped patch on its rump, partially bisected by a light brown vertical line. Males are darker in colour than females, and the coat of both sexes is more noticeably greyish in winter. The fur lacks an undercoat, consisting only of dense guard hairs. Male Przewalski's gazelles have ridged horns, which rise between the eyes and curve inwards at the tips; in younger males, the tips may actually touch, but they diverge as the animal ages. In the adult, the horns reach 18 to 26 cm (7.1 to 10.2 in) in length. The females are hornless.

Przewalski's gazelle is similar in appearance to both the Tibetan gazelle and the Mongolian gazelle, to both of which it is closely related, and occurs in similar geographic areas. It is intermediate in size between the other two species, and can most easily be distinguished from them by the shape of its horns.

== Distribution and habitat ==
Until the early 20th century, Przewalski's gazelle was widespread across the high plateaus of northwestern China and Inner Mongolia. However, it is now found only in a single small area around Qinghai Lake, having been extirpated across the great majority of its former range. It inhabits flat open valleys and steppeland between mountains, and the sand dunes and semi-desert zones around lakes.

Two sub-species have been described, although one is now believed to be extinct:

- P. przewalskii przewalskii - Qinghai
- P. przewalskii diversicornis † - Gansu and the Ordos Loop region

== Behaviour and ecology ==
The preferred diet of Przewalski's gazelles consists of sedges and grasses, supplemented by herbs and shrubs such as Astragalus. They are often found foraging together with Tibetan gazelles, but do not compete for resources because the latter animal prefers legumes. Such associations with a related species allow for larger herds, which may help protect both species from predators. The diet of Przewalski's gazelles has remained largely unchanged since the Early Holocene, as evidenced by analyses of both enamel δ^{13}C and dental microwear of Przewalski's gazelle specimens from the Qinghai Lake Basin dating back to between 8900 and 7900 BP. Like modern Przewalski's gazelles, they were primarily grazers of C_{3} grasses.

The gazelle usually travels in small groups, with rarely more than a dozen individuals, although much larger herds were reported in the 19th century, when the overall population was higher. Males are often solitary or travel in small groups of two or three individuals for much of the year, but gather together in small herds with the females during the winter rut.

Przewalski's gazelles are generally quiet, but have been reported to make short bleating sounds.

== Reproduction ==
Przewalski's gazelles rut from late December to early January. Males scent mark small territories and clash with rivals, fighting with their horns. Females have also been observed fighting for access to males. Courtship consists of the male moving towards the female while standing on his hind legs, and is followed by a brief copulation.

Gestation lasts around six months, so that the young are born around May or June. The mother gives birth to a single offspring, usually in thickets or areas of tall grass, where they can be concealed from potential predators. The young are able to follow their mother within a few minutes of birth, although they may remain concealed for a few days before rejoining the herd. Females become fertile during their second year, around 18 months of age. The lifespan of Przewalski's gazelles is unknown, although based on that of related species, it is probably around eight years.

== Conservation ==
Przewalski's gazelle is perhaps one of the most endangered species of large mammal on Earth. The many threats against the species include competition with domestic livestock and fencing of the natural habitat. These problems have become exacerbated as the area is increasingly developed as agricultural land.

While now protected by Chinese law, and illegal hunting no longer is considered an important factor, a large percentage of the habitat of this species has already been lost due to human activities. Consequently, it is considered to be an endangered species by the IUCN. Formerly, it was believed that as few as 250 remained, and it was considered critically endangered. However, this is now known to be an underestimate, with new subpopulations having been discovered in 2003 and 2006, and there were believed to be 350-400 (and possibly even more) mature individuals left. By 2020, the population had exceeded 2,700, but the species continued to face severe threats.

== See also ==
- List of endangered and protected species of China
