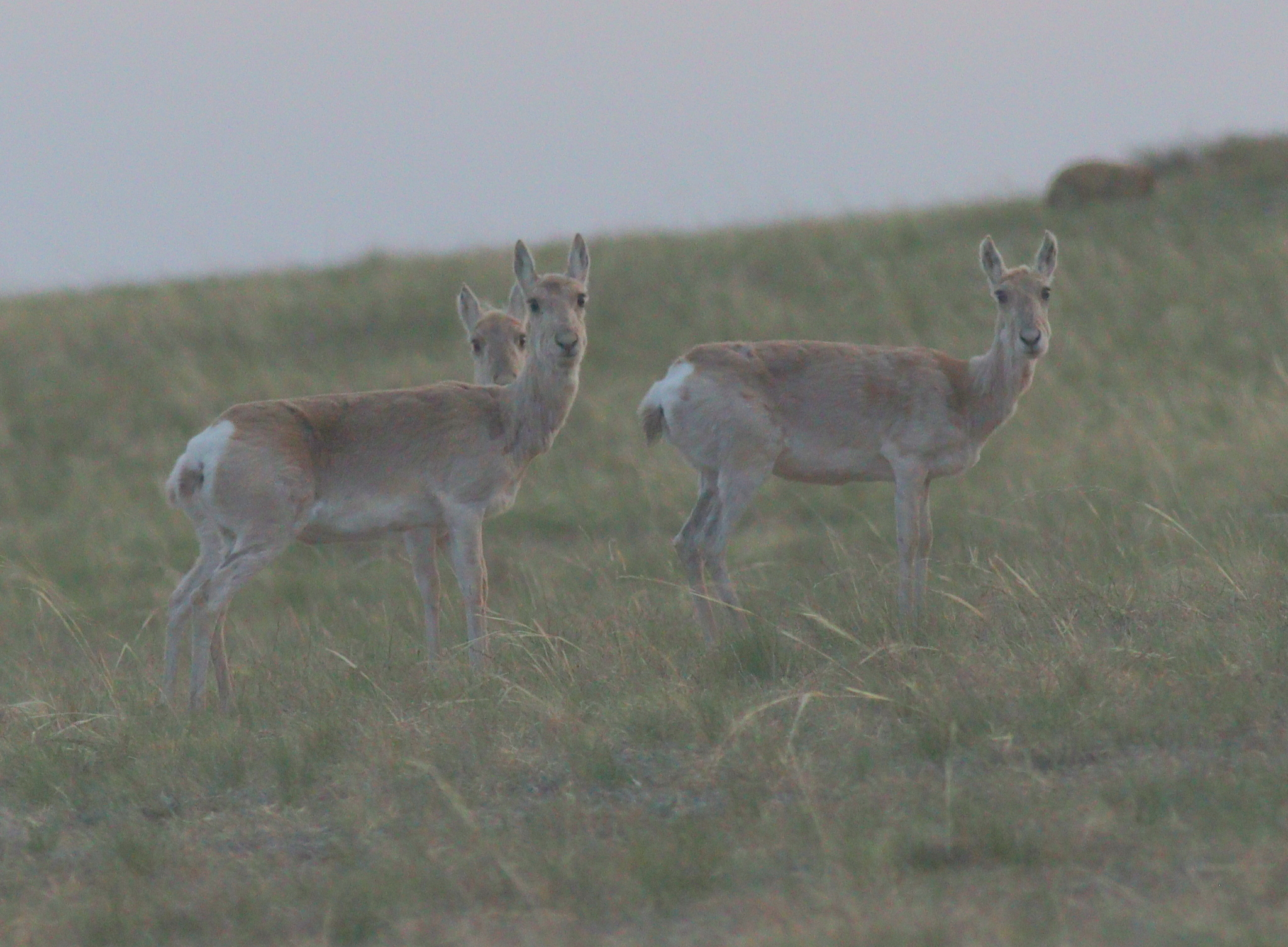

Conservation status
- Least Concern (IUCN 3.1)

Scientific classification
- Kingdom: Animalia
- Phylum: Chordata
- Class: Mammalia
- Order: Artiodactyla
- Family: Bovidae
- Subfamily: Antilopinae
- Genus: Procapra
- Species: P. gutturosa

Binomial name
- Procapra gutturosa (Pallas, 1777)

Synonyms
- Antilope gutturosa Pallas, 1777 o; Procapra gutturosa gutturosa Pallas, 1777; Procapra altaica Hollister, 1913; Procapra gutturosa altaica Hollister, 1913; Gazella mongolica Heude, 1894

= Mongolian gazelle =

Species of mammal

The Mongolian gazelle (Procapra gutturosa), or dzeren (Russian: дзерен), is a medium-sized antelope native to the semiarid Central Asian steppes of Mongolia, southern Siberia and northern China. The name dzeren is the Russian spelling and pronunciation of the Buryat zeeren (Buryat: зээрэн; akin to the Mongolian word zeer (Mongolian: зээр)).

== Taxonomy ==
While the dzeren and its two sister-species (the Tibetan gazelle or goa and the rare Przewalski's gazelle of Qinghai, China) are commonly referred to as "gazelles", they are not technically "true" gazelles, as they are not placed within the Gazella genus. Rather, these three procaprid antelope species are placed together in their own genus, Procapra, falling under the tribe of Antilopini (of the subfamily Antilopinae), under the greater Bovidae family of the Artiodactyla Order. In general, the dzeren are fluffier-coated than true gazelles, possessing an almost "teddy bear"-like appearance, as opposed to the sleek and smooth, deer-like qualities of Gazella and other species. The dzeren's face is somewhat more comparable to a Chinese water deer than a true gazelle.

== Description ==
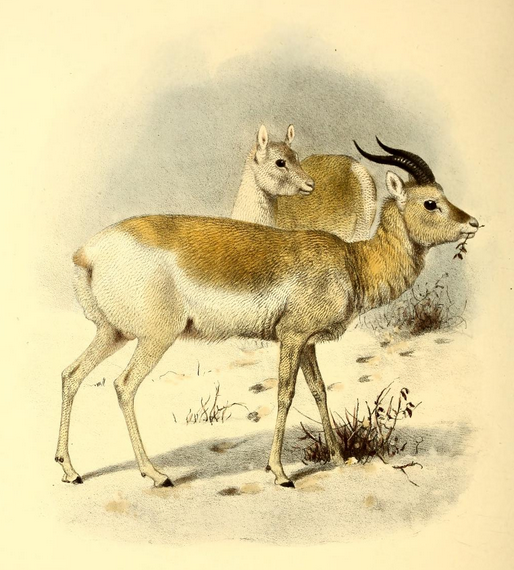
Artist's depiction of the Mongolian gazelle

In the summer, the dzeren has coat of tawny light brown with pale pinkish tones, which grows thicker, longer and paler during the winter. It also has a distinctive, heart-shaped white patch on its rump area, divided by a median line of darker color. The male has lyre-shaped horns which curl backwards from the forehead. It is an extremely capable long-distance runner and a good swimmer.

== Distribution and habitat ==
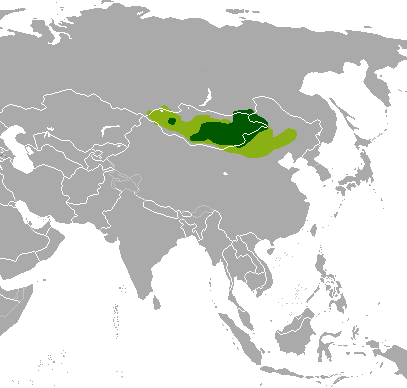
Historical (light green) and present range (dark green)

Mongolian gazelles live in semi-arid, cold, and temperate ecosystems. They thrive in flat or undulating steppes and dry grasslands, with a preference for steppe and desert steppe habitats adorned with clusters of vegetation. The estimated global range of the Mongolian gazelle is 746,281 km^{2}, of which 91% is in Mongolia (681,863 km^{2}), 5% in China (34,718 km^{2}) and 4% in Russia (29,700 km^{2}).

== Behavior ==
In the winter, they are mostly diurnal, but in the summer, they are active shortly after sunrise and before sunset. They tend to travel a lot, and migrations takes place in spring and autumn, but the distance and direction vary depending on the weather and food availability.

The groups usually consists of 20-30 individuals in the summer, and 100 in the winter. However, herds up to 5,000 individuals are not unusual. They still exist in large numbers, with a small captive population; the population trend is unknown. In 2007, a mega-herd of a quarter of a million Mongolian gazelles was seen gathering on the country's steppes, one of the world's last great wildernesses.

== Reproduction ==
The mating season is in the late autumn or winter; at this time, the males' throats swell in a goiter-like effect. Competition is vigorous, but fights rarely break out. The gestation period lasts for about 5–6 months. Births occur is June and July, when groups of dozens of females separate from the herd to give birth, rejoining the herd afterward. They usually give birth to a single young and occasionally twins. They weigh about 3 kg and can keep up with their mother after a few days. They will be able to mate after 17–18 months.

== Relationship with humans ==
The Mongolian gazelle is still one of the most numerous large animals in the world, with the total population around 1.5 million individuals, but roughly 100,000 are killed each year. However, the conservation status is at least concern. Whether the population is increasing or decreasing is unknown, but the population is known to be subject to significant fluctuations due to diseases and severe winters. They have been hunted for millennia: a passage in the 13th-century Secret History of the Mongols tells how a young Shigi Qutuqu managed to round up a herd of gazelles in a winter blizzard.
