= Gazella psolea =

Gazella psolea Temporal range: Late Pliocene

Scientific classification
- Domain: Eukaryota
- Kingdom: Animalia
- Phylum: Chordata
- Class: Mammalia
- Order: Artiodactyla
- Family: Bovidae
- Subfamily: Antilopinae
- Tribe: Antilopini
- Genus: Gazella
- Subgenus: †Deprezia; Geraads & Amani, 1998
- Species: †G. psolea

Binomial name
- †Gazella psolea Geraads & Amani, 1998

Extinct species of mammal

Gazella psolea is an unusual prehistoric species of gazelle that lived in Africa and Arabia; it is only known from fossils. It makes up the subgenus Deprezia due to its unique skull morphology: it had a long premolar row, and its nasal area is peculiar, with short nasal bones and a very large nasal opening. It therefore seems to have been able to breathe cold and dry air (a similar adaptation as found in the saiga), but why this feature evolved is still rather mysterious. One possibility is that it made seasonal migrations to the High Atlas mountains, where such an adaptation would have been useful.

The species lived during the Late Pliocene (some 2.5 mya); its remains have been found at Ahl al Oughlam near Casablanca, Morocco.
