= Parastrepsiceros =

Parastrepsiceros Temporal range: Pliocene

Scientific classification
- Domain: Eukaryota
- Kingdom: Animalia
- Phylum: Chordata
- Class: Mammalia
- Order: Artiodactyla
- Family: Bovidae
- Genus: †Parastrepsiceros; Vekua, 1968

Extinct genus of mammals

Parastrepsiceros is an extinct genus of Pliocene bovid from Eurasia.

== Taxonomy ==
Some authors have suggested that Parastrepsiceros sokolovi is synonymous with and represents an early subspecies of Gazellospira torticornis.

== Distribution ==
Parastrepsiceros koufosi fossils are known from Greece. P. sokolovi inhabited Georgia.
