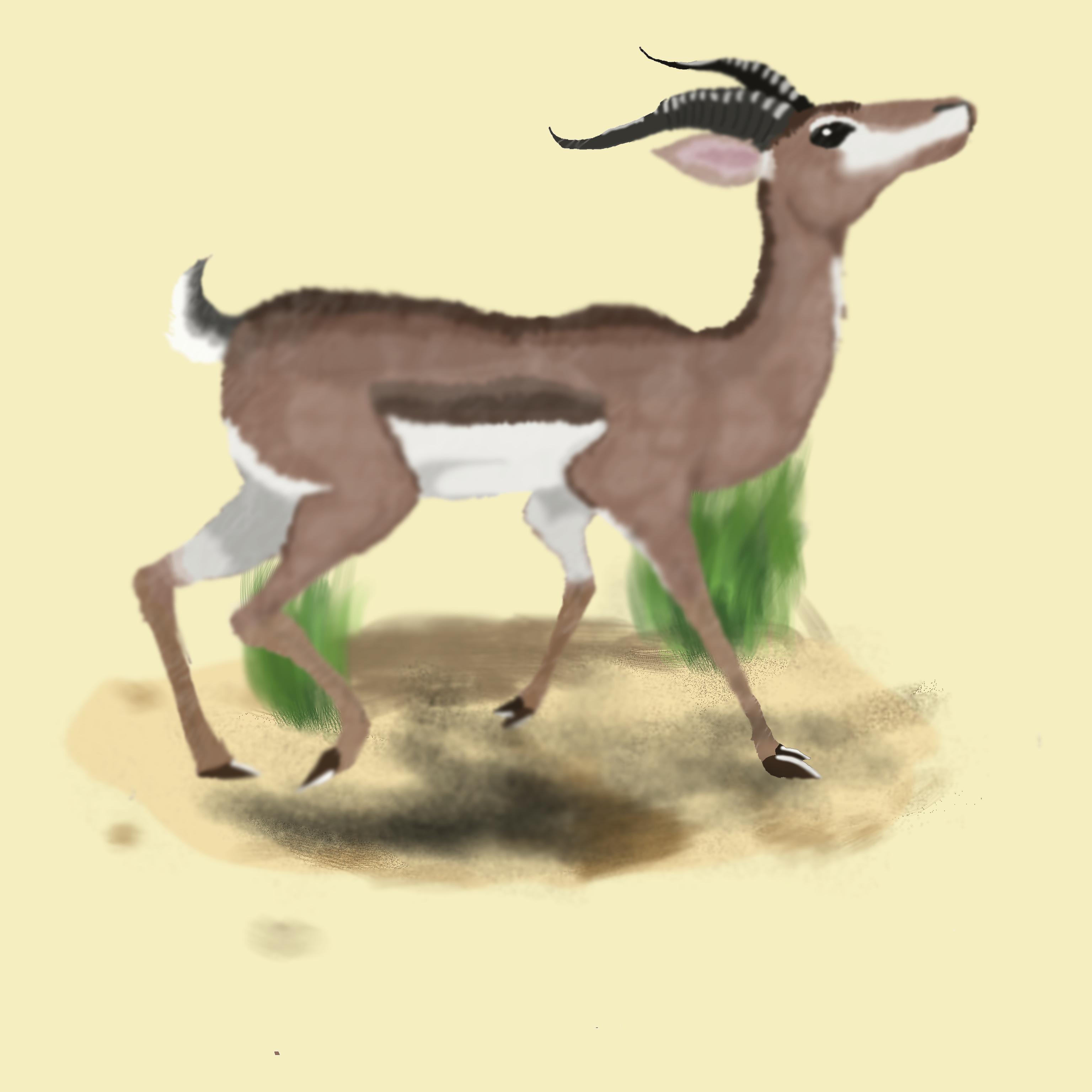

Conservation status
- Extinct (1951) (IUCN 3.1)

Scientific classification
- Kingdom: Animalia
- Phylum: Chordata
- Class: Mammalia
- Order: Artiodactyla
- Family: Bovidae
- Subfamily: Antilopinae
- Genus: Gazella
- Species: †G. bilkis

Binomial name
- †Gazella bilkis Groves & Lay, 1985

= Queen of Sheba's gazelle =

Extinct species of antelope

The Queen of Sheba's gazelle or Yemen gazelle (Gazella bilkis) is an extinct species of gazelle. It was sometimes regarded as a subspecies of the Arabian gazelle, which is no longer a valid species. It was found on the mountains and hillsides in Yemen, but none have been sighted since 1951, when five specimens were collected in mountains near Ta'izz, where it was reportedly common at the time.

Surveys in the area of their former occurrence have failed to find any sign of its presence. In 1985, a photograph of gazelles was taken in a private collection, Al Wabra Wildlife Farm, in Qatar. Zoologist Colin Groves claimed these could possibly be surviving Queen of Sheba's gazelles. It is not confirmed whether these animals truly belong to this species. The cause of extinction is still uncertain.
