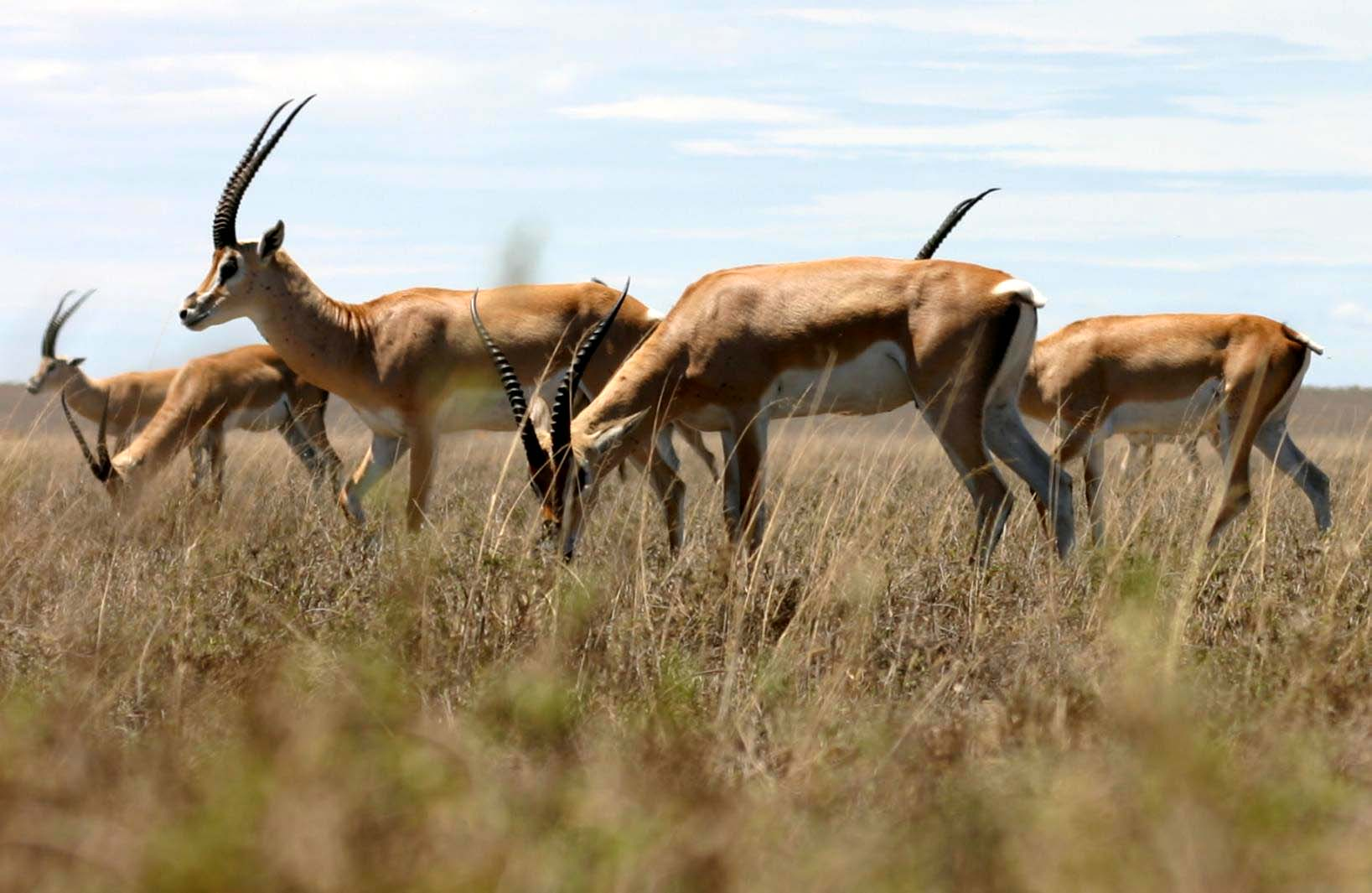
- Grant's Gazelle (Nanger granti)

Scientific classification
- Kingdom: Animalia
- Phylum: Chordata
- Class: Mammalia
- Order: Artiodactyla
- Family: Bovidae
- Subfamily: Antilopinae
- Tribe: Antilopini
- Genus: Nanger; Lataste, 1885

Type species
- Antilope mhorr Bennett, 1833

= Nanger =

Genus of mammals

Nanger is a genus of antelopes, commonly called gazelles. It was originally considered a subgenus within the genus Gazella, but has since been elevated to genus status. The three living species within the genus Nanger are:

Image	Scientific name	Common name	Distribution
	Nanger dama	Dama gazelle	Chad, Mali, and Niger
	Nanger granti	Grant's gazelle	northern Tanzania to South Sudan and Ethiopia, and from the Kenyan coast to Lake Victoria
	Nanger soemmerringii	Soemmerring's gazelle	Horn of Africa

- Nanger vanhoepeni†
