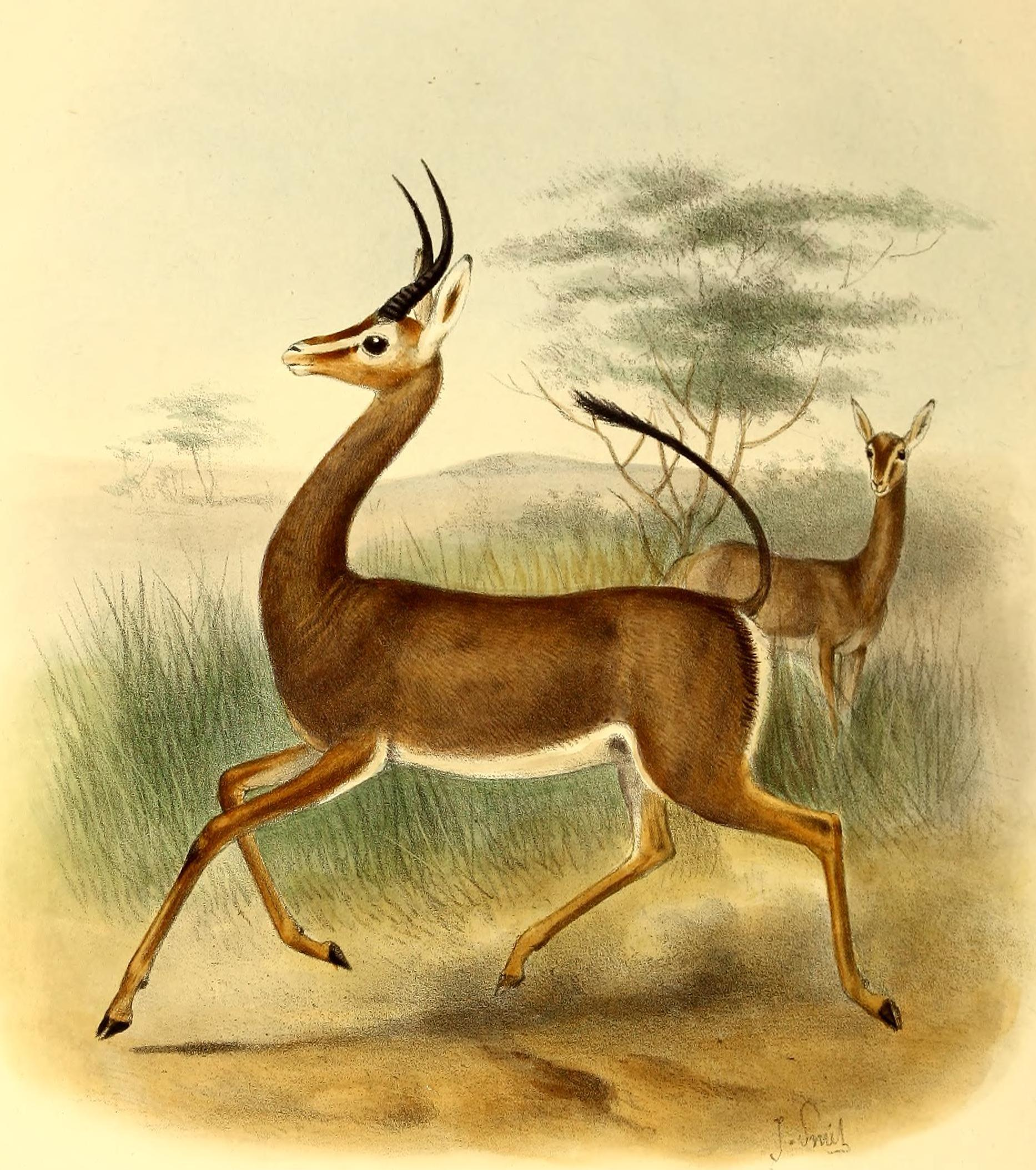

Conservation status
- Vulnerable (IUCN 3.1)

Scientific classification
- Kingdom: Animalia
- Phylum: Chordata
- Class: Mammalia
- Order: Artiodactyla
- Family: Bovidae
- Subfamily: Antilopinae
- Genus: Ammodorcas; Thomas, 1891
- Species: A. clarkei

Binomial name
- Ammodorcas clarkei (Thomas, 1891)
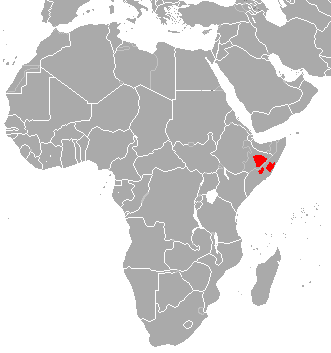
- Dibatag range

= Dibatag =

Species of antelope

The dibatag (Ammodorcas clarkei), or Clarke's gazelle, is a medium-sized slender antelope native to Ethiopia and Somalia. Though not a true gazelle, it is similarly marked, with long legs and neck. It is often confused with the gerenuk due to their striking resemblance. The typical head-and-body length is about 103 to 117 cm (41 to 46 in). They stand up to about 80 to 90 cm (31 to 35 in). Male dibatag weigh between 20 and 35 kg (44 and 77 lb), whereas females range from 22 and 29 kg (49 and 64 lb). The length of the curved horns, present only on males, is typically between 10 and 25 cm (3.9 and 9.8 in). The upper parts are gray to fawn, while the dorsal and lateral areas are cinnamon to rufous (reddish brown). The underparts, rump and the insides of the legs are all white. While markings are visible on the face, there are none on the flanks or the buttocks.

Dibatag are alert and secretive, and their brown coat provides an excellent camouflage, making the dibatag one of the antelopes most difficult to hunt. They are diurnal animals, and navigate in very small herds. Both sexes attain sexual maturity at 12 to 18 months. The species is polygynous. After a gestational period of six to seven months, a single offspring is born. Parturition usually occurs from September to November. The lifespan typically averages 10 to 12 years. Dibatag may maintain temporary territories demarcated by preorbital gland secretions, urine or feces. Primarily browsers, the dibatag feed on foliage and young shoots and shrubs. Dibatag are well adapted to semi-arid habitats, with the capability of surviving on very little or no water.

Several factors including human settlement, habitat degradation, large numbers of livestock, political unrest and armed conflicts in the areas covering its range and lack of conservation measures for two to three decades in the late 20th century have now reduced the population to only a few thousand. Significant populations still occur in southern Ogaden (Ethiopia). The dibatag is listed by the IUCN as "Vulnerable".

== Taxonomy and etymology ==
The dibatag was first described in 1891 by British zoologist Oldfield Thomas, who gave it the scientific name Ammodorcas clarkei. It is the sole member of the genus Ammodorcas, and is placed in the family Bovidae. Some authors such as Rod East of the IUCN SSC Antelope specialist group have classified it under a separate tribe Ammodorcadini. When Thomas first studied specimens from Somalia in 1891, he observed that the animal seemed to combine the horns of a reedbuck with the characteristic features of a gazelle (muzzle, facial markings, and anteorbital glands). At first, he considered it to be a reedbuck, though it appeared unnatural that a reedbuck should occur in the dry sandy plateau of Somalia. Thomas originally considered it a relative of the genus Redunca due to similarities in the morphology of horns, and placed it under the genus Cervicapra. However, after considering further specimens, he placed it under the separate genus Ammodorcas. No subspecies have been identified.

The dibatag, which holds its black tail straight up when it is fleeing, gets its common name from the Somali words for 'tail' and 'erect': dabu and tag. The dibatag is also known as Clarke's gazelle, after T. W. H. Clarke, an Australian big game hunter who collected the type specimen.

== Description ==
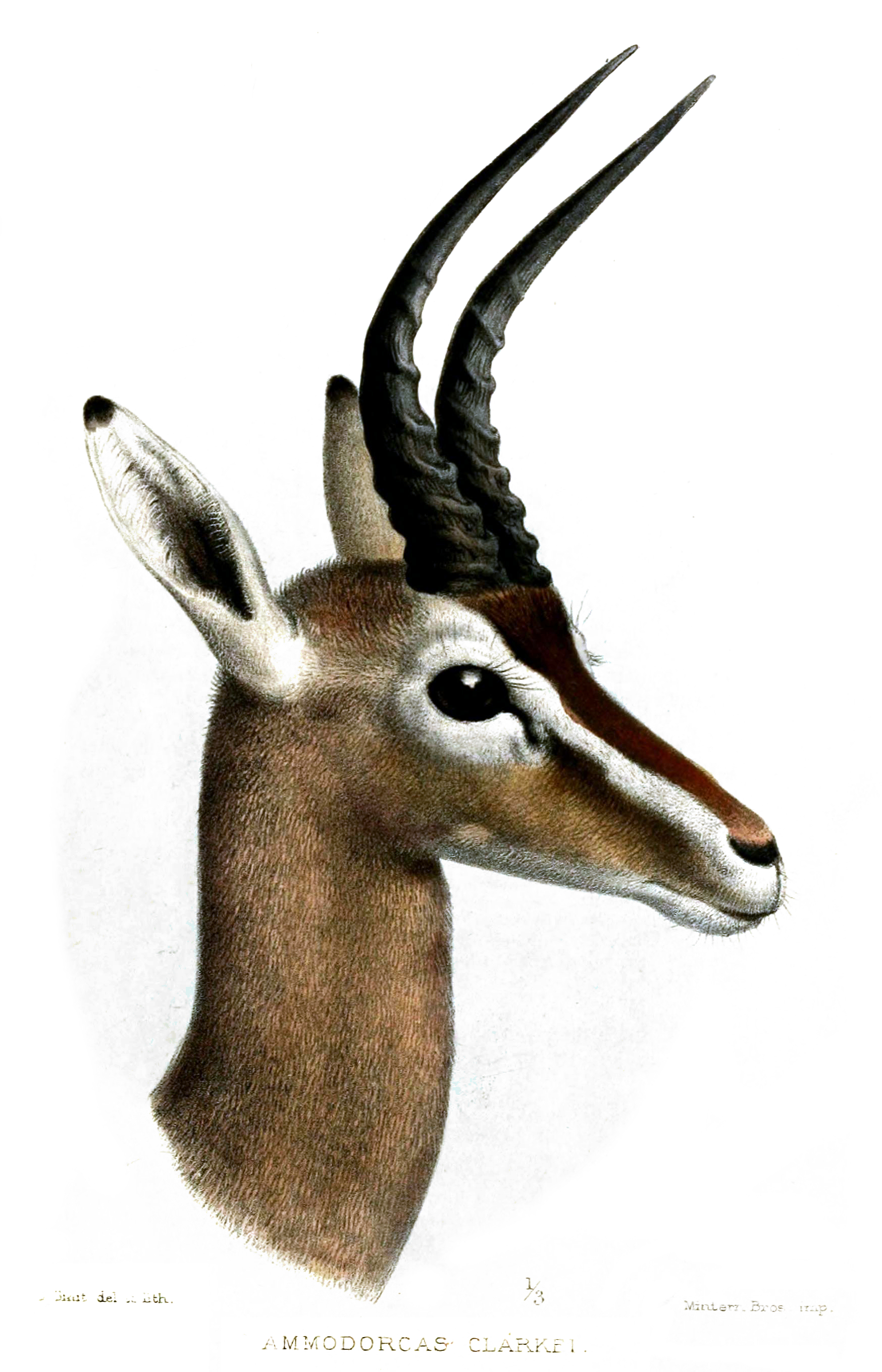
Detail of head illustrated by Joseph Smit, c. 1891

The dibatag is a medium-sized antelope with a slim body and long neck and legs. The typical head-and-body length is about 103 to 117 cm (41 to 46 in). It stands up to about 80 to 90 cm (31 to 35 in) at the shoulder. The male weighs between 20 and 35 kg (44 and 77 lb), whereas the female ranges from 22 and 29 kg (49 and 64 lb). The long dark tail ends in a rounded but indistinct tassel. The tail is nearly 30 to 36 cm (12 to 14 in) long. The curved horns, resembling those of reedbuck, are present only on males, with the pointing tips facing forward. The length of horns is typically between 10 and 25 cm (3.9 and 9.8 in), though Rowland Ward recorded a length of 33 cm (13 in) from Somalia. This antelope is sexually dimorphic, because females tend to be smaller than males and lack horns.

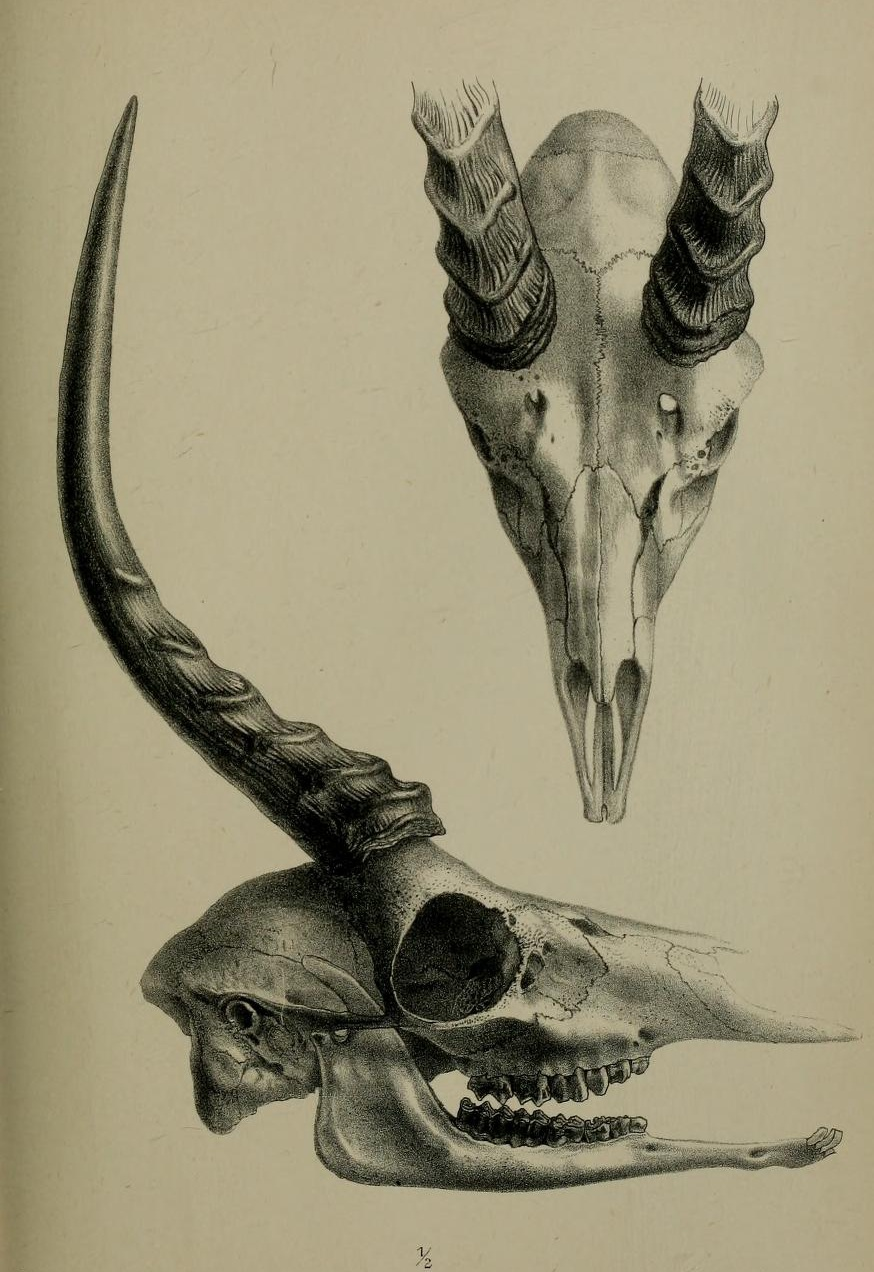
Two views of a male dibatag skull

The species has a small, flat, pointed, wedge-shaped head with large eyes and medium-sized ears. A similarity to the gazelles is the black, branched structure in the interior of the ears. The mouth is very small and the upper lip slightly elongated. There are strong facial markings resembling those of a gazelle. A chestnut brown streak runs from the crown up to the nostrils along the nose, flanked on both sides by parallel white stripes that circle the eyes. A white spot marks the throat. The soft and smooth coat is gray to fawn in the upper parts. The ventral side, rump and the insides of the legs are completely white, and the flanks and the buttocks are unmarked.

The dibatag closely resembles the gerenuk, with which it is sympatric in eastern and central Somalia and southeastern Ethiopia. Both are brachyodonts and share several facial and cranial features, along with a two-tone coloration of the pelage and strong thick horns (only in males). However, there are also some features distinguishing it from the gerenuk, including major morphological differences in horns, horn cores, tail, postorbital area and basioccipital processes. The gerenuk has a longer, heavier neck and a shorter tail. A finer point of difference is the absence of an inward-curving lobe in the lower edge of the ear (near its tip) in the gerenuk.

== Ecology and behavior ==
Dibatag are diurnal animals (they are active in the daytime). They navigate either in solitude or in very small herds, resembling the social behavior of the gerenuk. Singles and pairs are most common, though groups of up to six individuals have been reported. Generally groups of over four individuals are rarely observed. The reaction of dibatag towards gerenuk is obscure, with there being reports of their loose associations as well as avoidance of each other. These territorial animals may maintain temporary territories demarcated by preorbital gland secretions, urine or feces. They defecate at fixed points and form dung piles. Males fight one another to defend their territory. Sparring is a notable part of fighting behavior: one male pushes and shoves against the neck and horns of the opponent, trying to throw him off balance. The stance is head down with the nose tucked between the forelegs for protection.

Dibatags are well adapted to semi-arid habitats, with the capability of surviving on very little or no water. They meet most water requirements only from food. Their long neck and limbs enable them to place their forelegs on branches and reach higher branches. The brown pelage helps them hide in bushes. Alert and secretive, the dibatag hides in vegetation and remains motionless while watching for possible threats. When alarmed it flees in a slow and relaxed manner with the neck upright and tail erect. The antelope may even resort to stotting (a behavior particular to the gazelles), a kind of leaping with all four limbs in the air, but this gait is most often used during play. It gallops only when in real danger. Predators include the cheetah, lion, spotted hyaena, black-backed jackal, caracal, Cape hunting dog and large eagles. Eagles usually target juveniles.

=== Diet ===
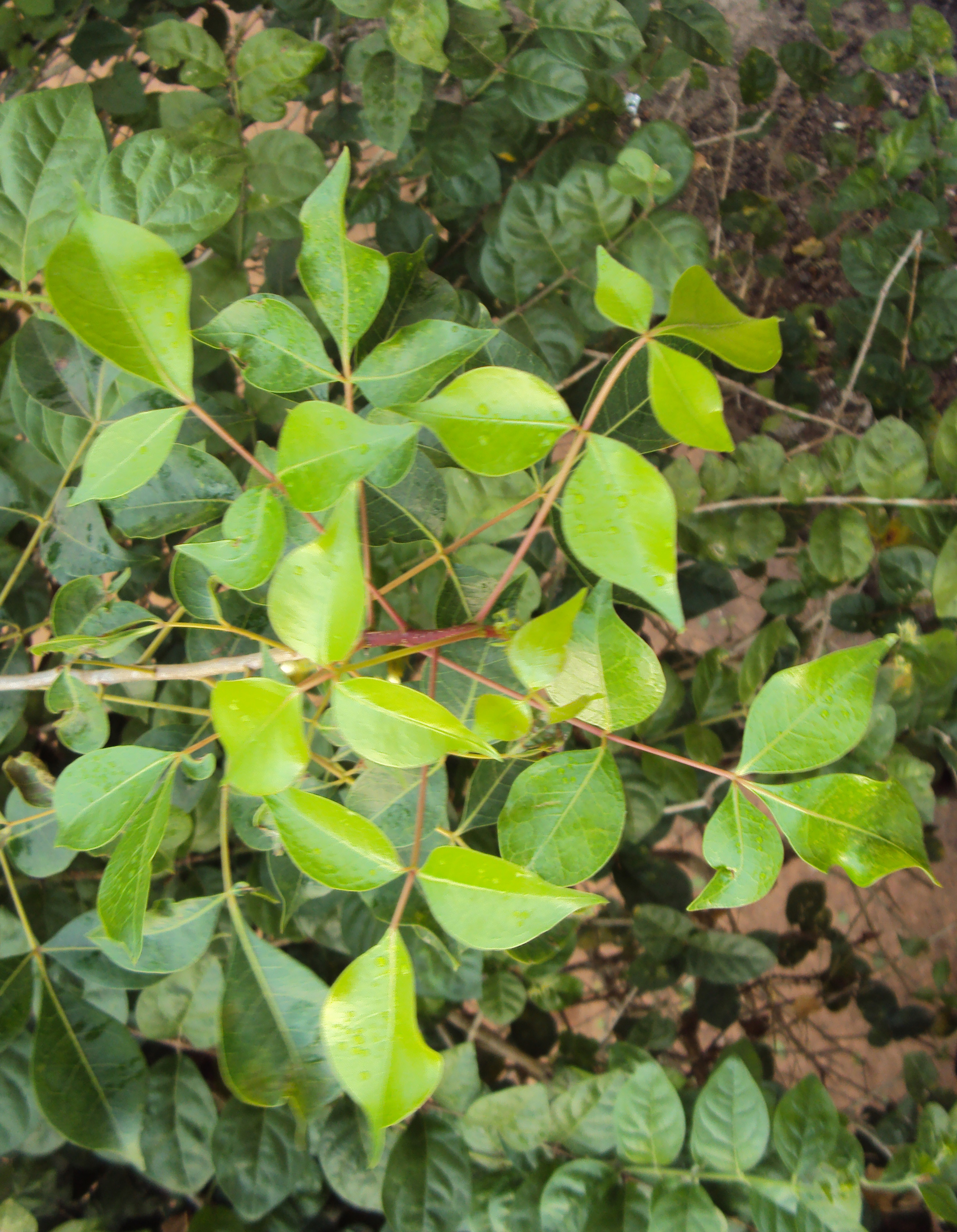
Commiphora, one of the plants preferred by the dibatag

The dibatag is a typical browser, whose diet consists of foliage and young shoots and shrubs. It limits itself to a small area for foraging. Dibatag have hardly been observed drinking water in the wild. The elongated upper lip assists in the ingestion of thorny vegetation, while leaves are plucked off by the front teeth and mobile lips. They prefer Commiphora, Acacia, Boscia, Dichrostachys and Maerua species. They often gather in areas with leafy Commiphora stands due to the high water content of their leaves and shoots. In the rainy season, young soft grasses are preferred, while in the dry season they feed on fry fruits, flowers, buds, shrubs, and tall herbs. They choose a wide variety of species for browsing, hence no clear diet specialization is identified.

=== Reproduction ===
Both sexes attain sexual maturity at 12 to 18 months. The species is polygynous. Rutting appears to be related to the onset of the wet season in several parts of the range. Observations in the Naples Zoo show many similarities between the courtship behavior of the dibatag and that of the gerenuk. The male dibatag pursues the female; during the march his body is upright and the nose is held high. The male uses preorbital gland secretions to mark the female on her chest and rump. Flehmen, leg-tapping, urine testing and nosing of female genitalia are notable features of the courtship. Once in close contact with the female, he slowly raises his foreleg between her hindlegs; this is followed by copulation.

After a gestational period of six to seven months, a single offspring is born. Parturition usually occurs from September to November, though births have been reported even in June and July. The infant remains in hiding for one or two weeks, with its mother close by. No further information on parental care is available. The lifespan of a dibatag averages 10 to 12 years.

== Habitat and distribution ==
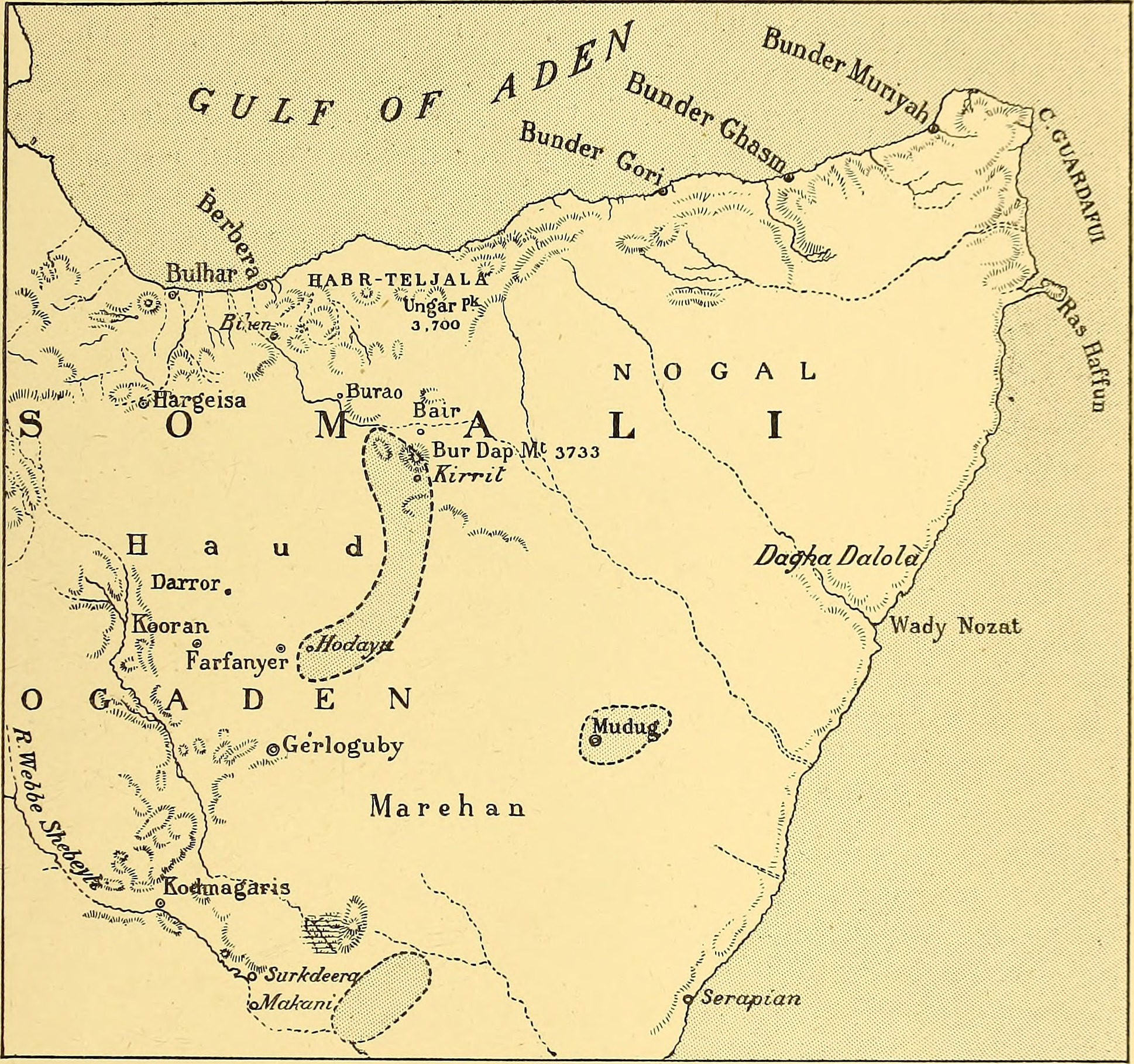
An 1894 map showing the historical distribution of dibatag in Somaliland

Dibatag inhabit a mix of different habitat types. They may occasionally visit treelands. They are thought to be more commonly found in areas where Commiphora shrubs grow. They occur within the altitude range of 200 to 1,200 m (660 to 3,940 ft). Habitat preference does not vary significantly with seasons. A study published in 1972 found a greater number of the dibatag in areas rich in red soil.

The dibatag is endemic to the evergreen bushland of the Ogaden region of southeastern Ethiopia and adjoining parts in northern and central Somalia. In the past their range extended from the southern parts of northern Somalia through southeastern Ethiopia and central Somalia (between the coastline of the Indian Ocean and bounded by the Fafen River in the west and the Shebelle River in the southwest). Rock paintings of two dibatag were discovered on the west bank of the Nile River and north of the Aswan Dam in Egypt, suggesting a southward migration of the species in the Predynastic period in Egypt.

Nowadays, however, the dibatag has disappeared from the majority of its historical range. From 1985 to 2006, over two decades, the overall decline has been estimated at more than 30 percent of the original population. In the northern Ogaden, the animal has become very rare owing to a high density of human settlements and large numbers of armed pastoralists and their livestock. However, in the southern Ogaden, it is still common due to greater wealth of natural flora and fewer human settlements.

== Threats and conservation ==
Droughts and habitat degradation are the major threats across the range. In Somalia, conservation measures have been hindered by lack of political stability due to conflicts over two to three decades in the latter half of the 20th century. During this period its habitat was adversely affected by over-exploitation of wildlife, prevalence of weapons and deforestation. In Ethiopia hunting is the most severe threat to the dibatag; locals have claimed that dibatag meat is preferred due to its excellent taste. However its brown pelage and alertness and timidity make hunting for it in dense bushes considerably difficult compared to other antelopes.

The dibatag has been identified as Vulnerable by the International Union for Conservation of Nature and Natural Resources (IUCN). It has not been listed under the Washington Convention (CITES). There are no protected areas in its range. No population estimates or surveys could be made in the three decades from the 1960s to the 1990s due to political unrest and armed conflicts in the areas covering the range. The total surviving population is not known. In 1998, Rod East gave an estimate that the populations must be in only a few thousand given a total remaining range of 10,000 km^{2} (3,900 sq mi) and a population density of 0.1 to 0.3 per square kilometer. In 2006, the population in Ogaden was estimated at 1,500. The scenario is grim in Somalia: the dibatag have been overhunted, and their habitat faces destruction due to farming practices such as livestock grazing. They are also threatened by drought. It had nearly disappeared from most of the country by the early 1980s. Though locals claimed to have seen it in the central coastal hinterland even in the late 1980s, no clear surveys have been conducted since then to support this. Captive populations are not known.
