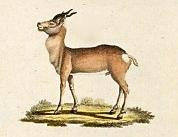
- Mongolian gazelle Procapra gutturosa

Scientific classification
- Domain: Eukaryota
- Kingdom: Animalia
- Phylum: Chordata
- Class: Mammalia
- Order: Artiodactyla
- Family: Bovidae
- Subfamily: Antilopinae
- Tribe: Antilopini
- Genus: Procapra; Hodgson, 1846

Type species
- Procapra picticaudata Hodgson, 1846

Species
- P. gutturosa P. picticaudata P. przewalskii

= Procapra =

Genus of mammals

Procapra is a genus of Asian gazelles, including three living species:

- Mongolian gazelle P. gutturosa
- Tibetan gazelle P. picticaudata
- Przewalski's gazelle P. przewalskii

The oldest fossils belonging to the genus Procapra date from the late Pliocene or early Pleistocene of central Asia, when the climate was wetter and milder than now. The genus apparently evolved from animals similar to the Pliocene gazelle Gazella sinensis, and is known to have been hunted by early Neolithic humans at Lake Qinghai in China.
