= Prostrepsiceros =

Prostrepsiceros Temporal range: Miocene

Scientific classification
- Kingdom: Animalia
- Phylum: Chordata
- Class: Mammalia
- Order: Artiodactyla
- Family: Bovidae
- Genus: †Prostrepsiceros; Major, 1891

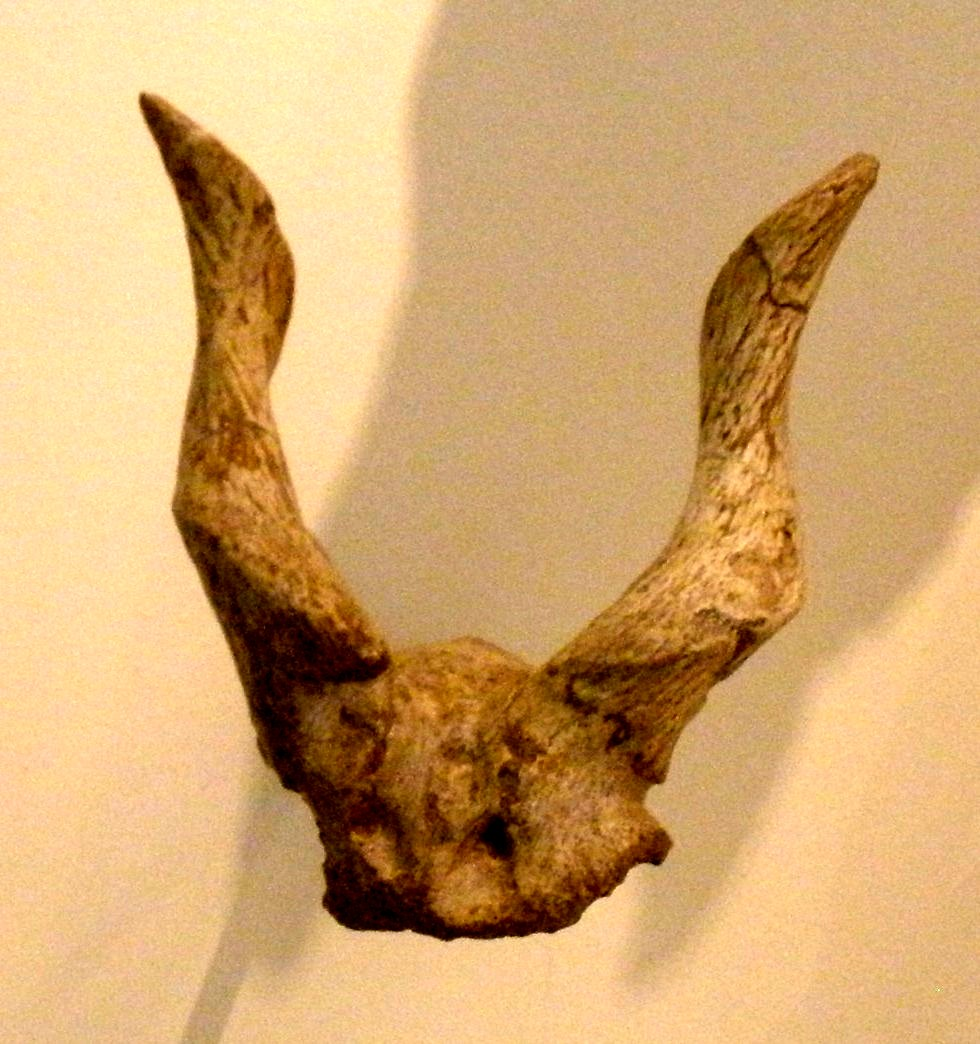
Fossil of Prostrepsiceros

Prostrepsiceros was a genus of bovid from the Miocene epoch.

== Geographic range ==
P. rotundicornis is known from fossils from Greece and Turkey. P. houtumschindleri occurs in Turkey. P. vallesiensis is known from Greece.
