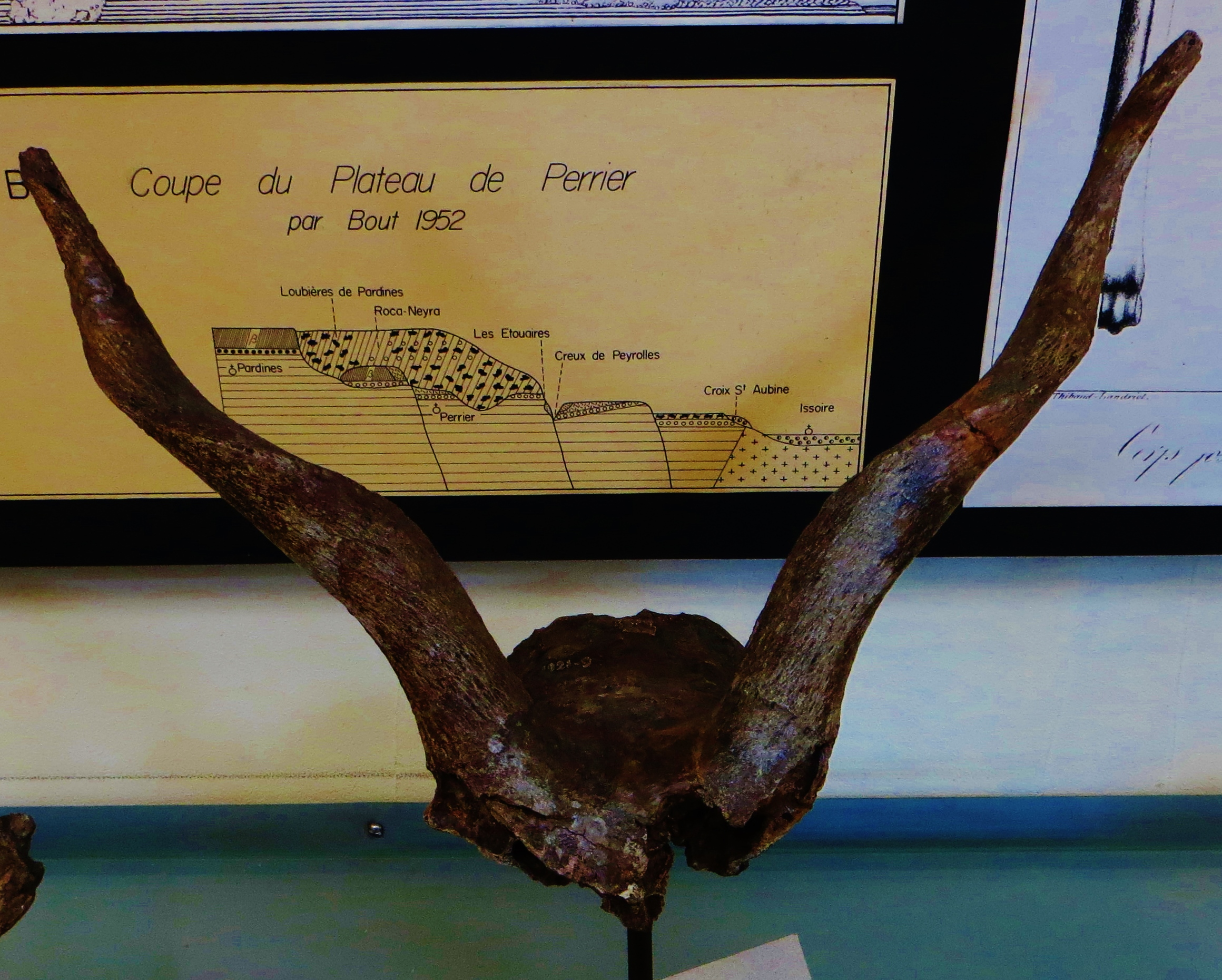
- Gazellospira torticornis

Scientific classification
- Kingdom: Animalia
- Phylum: Chordata
- Class: Mammalia
- Order: Artiodactyla
- Family: Bovidae
- Subfamily: Antilopinae
- Genus: †Gazellospira; Pilgrim and Schaub 1939

= Gazellospira =

Extinct genus of mammals

Gazellospira is an extinct genus of antelope that lived during the Miocene to Pleistocene in Europe and Asia.

== Distribution ==
G. torticornis fossils are known from France, Spain, Italy, Crimea, Russia, Romania, Bulgaria, Greece, Turkey, and Georgia. G. tsaparangensis is known from the Pliocene of the Zanda Basin in Tibet.

== Palaeoecology ==
G. torticornis teeth from the Piacenzian site of Sésklo in Greece indicate that it was a mixed feeder that periodically grazed.
