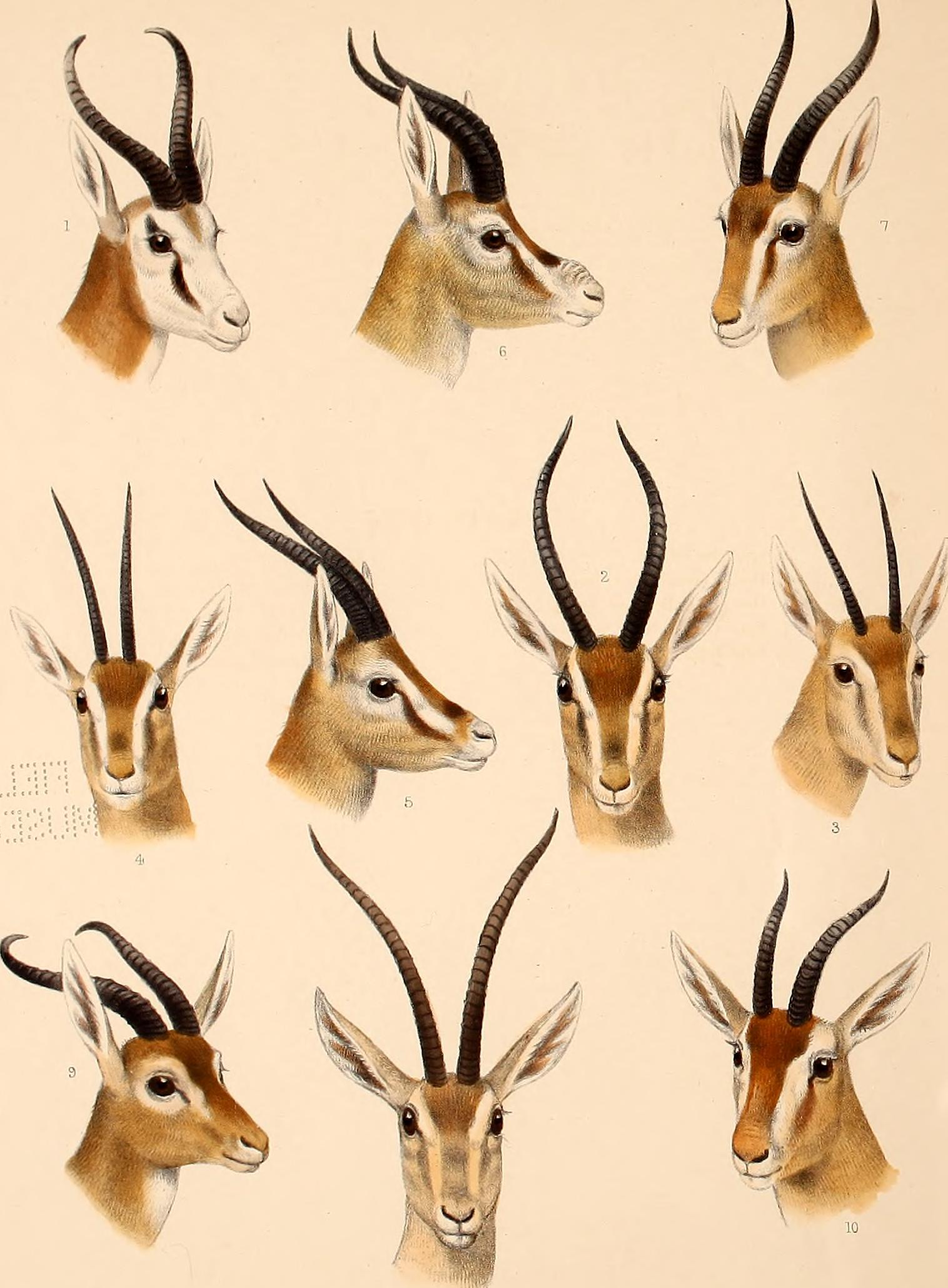
- Antidorcas ♂ (top left), Gazella ♂♂ (nos. 2 – 8), Eudorcas ♂♂ (bottom left & right)

Scientific classification
- Kingdom: Animalia
- Phylum: Chordata
- Class: Mammalia
- Order: Artiodactyla
- Family: Bovidae
- Subfamily: Antilopinae
- Tribe: Antilopini; Hassanin & Douzery, 2003

Genera
- Ammodorcas; Antidorcas; Antilope; Eudorcas; Gazella; Litocranius; Nanger; Procapra; †Spiraliscornis

= Antilopini =

Tribe of mammals

Antilopini is a tribe of bovids often referred as true antelopes like gazelles. They live in and around the Sahara, Horn of Africa, throughout eastern and southern Africa, and Eurasia, with the type species being the blackbuck of south Asia. Depending on species, the females have either very short or thin horns compared with the males, or no horns at all. They have smooth and glossy tan and white coats. Most species in the group have black stripes and facial markings. They have a territorial male as a leader in herds and sometimes group with other species, such as Grant's gazelle joining with Thomson's gazelle. They can reach top speeds of 50 miles per hour (80 km/h) and have the ability to jump and turn sharply. They have adapted well to running in open environments.
