= Prince Mohammad bin Salman Royal Reserve =

Protected area in Saudi Arabia

Prince Mohammed bin Salman Royal Reserve
- Location within Saudi Arabia
- Location: Northwestern Saudi Arabia (between NEOM, the Red Sea Project, and AlUla)
- Coordinates: 27°00′N 36°30′E
- Area: 24,500 sq. km
- Established: June 2018
- Named for: Crown Prince Mohammed bin Salman Al Saud
- Governing body: Council of Royal Reserves / Prince Mohammed bin Salman Royal Reserve Development Authority
- Website: pmbsrr.gov.sa

The Prince Mohammad bin Salman Royal Reserve (PMBSRR) (Arabic: محمية الأمير محمد بن سلمان الملكية) is a 24,500 km^{2} protected area located in the northwestern region of Saudi Arabia. Spanning across portions of the Tabuk Province and the Medina Province, the reserve covers approximately 1% of the Kingdom's terrestrial landmass and 1.8% of its territorial waters. It encompasses 15 distinct ecosystems that transition from the high Hejaz Mountains down to the coastal shores of the Red Sea.

The reserve was established by a royal decree in June 2018 to preserve regional biodiversity, combat environmental degradation and overgrazing, and pioneer ecological restoration under the Saudi Vision 2030 framework. It is managed with financial and administrative autonomy by a dedicated development authority overseen by the Council of Royal Reserves.

== Fauna ==
Historically, the herbivore populations here were decimated due to severe overhunting. The Arabian oryx was historically extirpated. However, the reserve has executed massive reintroduction initiatives, releasing captive-bred herds that have now successfully established free-ranging populations. Arabian sand gazelles, Arabian gazelles, and mountain gazelles have also been reintroduced in the thousands. The vulnerable Nubian ibex is increasing in numbers due to strict protection. In April 2024, the reserve introduced the Persian onager as a substitute for the globally extinct Syrian wild ass, marking the first free-running wild asses in Saudi Arabia in over 100 years. Arabian hare were also reintroduced, and rodent populations are also recovering.

The Arabian leopard, a critically endangered species, is considered functionally extinct in the reserve, having not been documented since 2014. However, the government has plans to reintroduce leopards in the near future, and they are already breeding them in captivity. The Asiatic cheetah and Asiatic lion are also locally extinct here, wiped out in the 20th century from overhunting. The government also plans to reintroduce caracals, which are functionally extinct here. Other predators here are critically endangered Arabian wolves, whose populations are increasing after strict legal protection, Rüppell's fox, Blanford's fox, and striped hyenas. Camera-trapping surveys in 2024 established the natural recolonization of golden jackals in this reserve.

The Arabian ostrich was entirely driven to extinction across the Arabian peninsula in the early 20th century from overhunting. In late 2025, the reserve introduced the critically endangered red-necked ostrich, the closest surviving genetic relative, to serve as an ecological replacement. The MacQueen's houbara bustard was decimated across its range by falconry and poaching, but it's now the focus of captive-bred reintroductions. Among large raptors, the reserve successfully reintroduced the griffon vulture and the pharaoh eagle-owl. The sooty falcon, eastern imperial eagle, and white-eyed gull can also be found here. In November 2025, field researchers at the Wadi Thalbah Wetland documented a juvenile, migratory white-tailed eagle, marking the first confirmed record of the massive apex raptor in Saudi Arabia in over two decades.

Along the coastline, Hawksbill sea turtles, dugongs, manta rays, and various reef sharks are common.

== See also ==
- List of protected areas of Saudi Arabia
