= Windsor Witches =

1579 witch trial in England

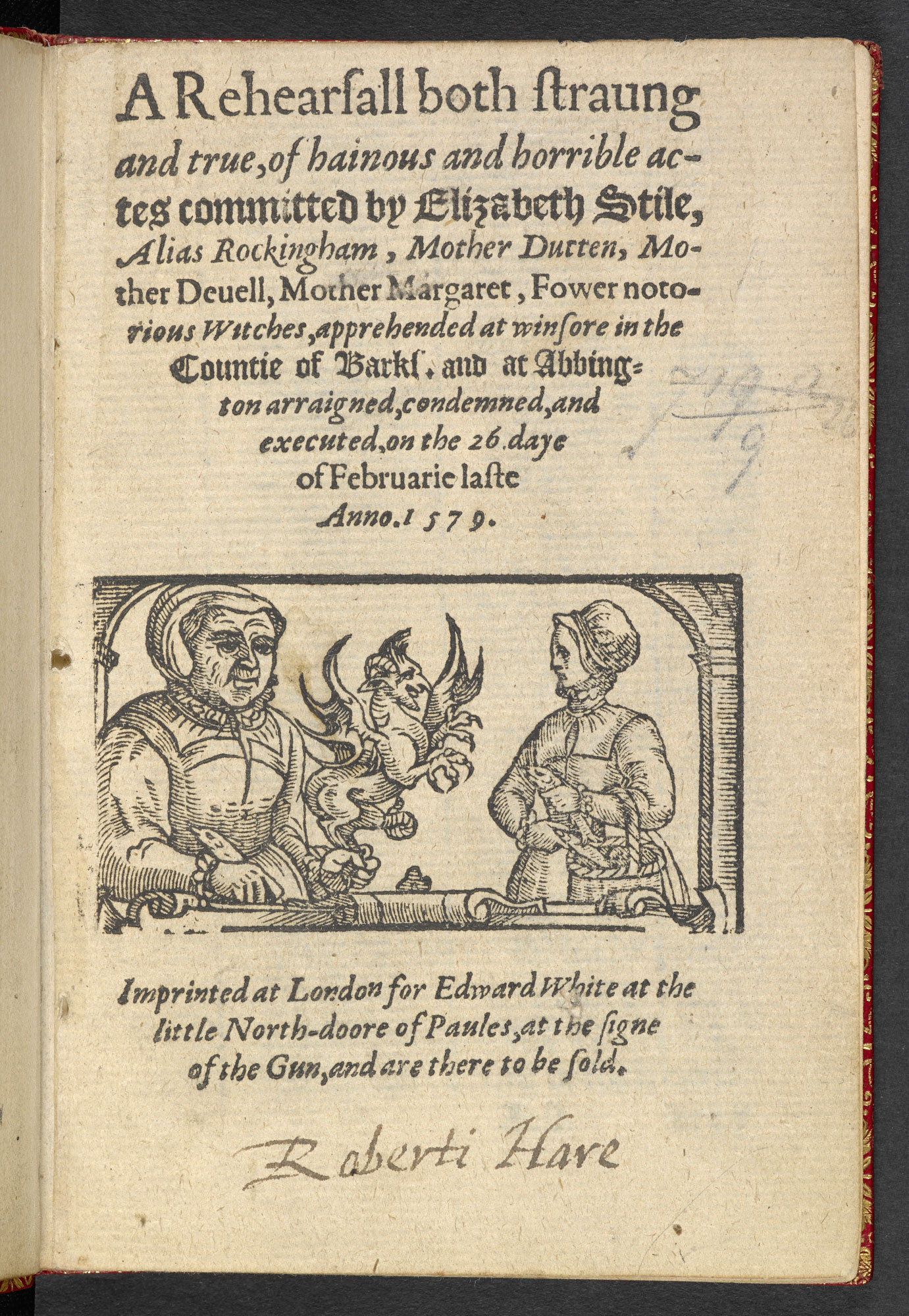
Witchcraft pamphlet:A Rehearsal both Strange and True, 1579

The Windsor Witches was the common name for a witch trial in Windsor and Abingdon in England in 1579. The name referred to the four women tried and executed for sorcery: the cunning woman Mother Elizabeth Stile, Mother Devell, Mother Dutten and Mother Margaret.

== The case and trial ==
The accusations included bewitchment by poppet. Elizabeth Stile, a local cunning woman who performed curses for money, was the first to be accused. She was arrested and brought before Henry Neville (d. 1593). It was not the first time she had been accused of witchcraft in that way. On this occasion Neville, who according to Fuidge during his career dealt with "witches suspected of making wax figures of the Queen", found there was enough evidence to detain her in Reading Gaol. Three wax figures, with bristles pushed into their left sides, had been discovered in August 1578 in London, in a dunghill. They had been interpreted as representing the Queen and two advisors.

Stile pointed out accomplices, and confessed that they had murdered several people by use of magic; and that they owned familiars and had the ability to transform into animals. The Privy Council intervened and put pressure on Neville, and William Day, Dean of Windsor, to look closely into the case, given the correlation with the London finding. No confirmation of treason resulted.

A man, Father Rosimond, named by Stile was released, Ostovich suggesting through his reading of the neck verse, the others being executed.

== In literature ==
The trial was the subject of the contemporary pamphlet A Rehearsal both Strange and True, 1579. Gibson suggests that the pamphlet's content comprised the gaol examination of Stile.

== See also ==
- The Witch-Cult in Western Europe
