= Saudi gazelle =

Conservation status
- Extinct (1970) (IUCN 3.1)

Scientific classification
- Kingdom: Animalia
- Phylum: Chordata
- Class: Mammalia
- Order: Artiodactyla
- Family: Bovidae
- Subfamily: Antilopinae
- Genus: Gazella
- Species: G. dorcas
- Subspecies: †G. d. saudiya

Trinomial name
- †Gazella dorcas saudiya Carruthers & Schwarz, 1935

Synonyms
- Gazella saudiya

Extinct species of gazelle

The Saudi gazelle (Gazella saudiya) is an extinct species of gazelle that was once native to the Arabian Peninsula. It was declared extinct in the wild in 1996, as it was last observed in the wild in 1970. The Saudi gazelle was officially declared extinct on the IUCN Red List in 2008.

== Taxonomy ==
Gazella gazella saudiya was the scientific name proposed by Douglas Carruthers and Ernst Schwarz in 1939. They described the skull and head skin of a male gazelle specimen collected at an elevation of 1,100 m (3,500 ft) near Dhlam in Saudi Arabia. Terence Morrison-Scott recognised it as a distinct species Gazella saudiya in 1939. Colin Groves examined horn shapes and sizes of zoological specimens of gazelles and recognised the Saudi gazelle as a subspecies of the Dorcas gazelle Gazella dorcas saudiya in 1969.

Phylogenetic analysis of museum samples of the Saudi gazelle revealed that it is distinct from and a sister taxon of the Dorcas gazelle.

== Distribution and habitat ==
The Saudi gazelle once lived in gravel and sandy plains with acacias of the northern and western Arabian Peninsula from Kuwait to Yemen, with most of the records coming from western Saudi Arabia. It was found singly or in groups up to 20.

== Decline and extinction ==
The species had always been rare and declining due to excessive hunting; it had not been seen for a few decades, and was declared to be extinct in the wild in 1980. Recent genetic analysis of all reported specimens of G.saudiya in captive collections has shown these represent different species or hybrids. Despite frequent surveys attempting to find pure Saudi gazelles in the wild and privately owned, no evidence of surviving individuals has been found. In 2008, the Saudi gazelle was officially declared extinct on the IUCN Red List.

== See also ==
- Arabian ostrich
- Arabian gazelle
