= List of protected areas of Oman =

A list of protected areas of Oman:

- Al Jabal Algharbi Nature Reserve
- Aldhahra Nature Reserve
- Alburaimi Oasis Nature Reserve
- Oryx Nature Reserve
- Turtle Reserve
- Ad Dimaniyat Islands Reserve
- Al Saleel National Park (As Salil Natural Park)
- Jabal Samhan Nature Reserve
- Al Jabal Al Akhdar Scenic Reserve
- Western Hajer Stars Lights Reserve
- Al Rustaq Wildlife Reserve
- Al Wusta Wetland Reserve
- Jabal Qahwan Nature Reserve
- Al Sareen Nature Reserve
- Ras al Shajar Nature Reserve
- Al Khuwuair Nature Reserve
- Khawrs of the Dhofar Coast Reserve
  - Khor Slalalah Nature Reserve
  - Khawr al Mughsayl Reserve
  - Khawr al Baleed Reserve
  - Khawr Sawli Reserve
  - Khawr al Dahareez Reserve
  - Khawr Taqah Reserve
  - Khawr Rawri Reserve
  - Khawr Awqad Reserve
  - Khawr al Qurum al Sagheer Reserve
  - Khawr al Qurum al Kabeer Reserve
