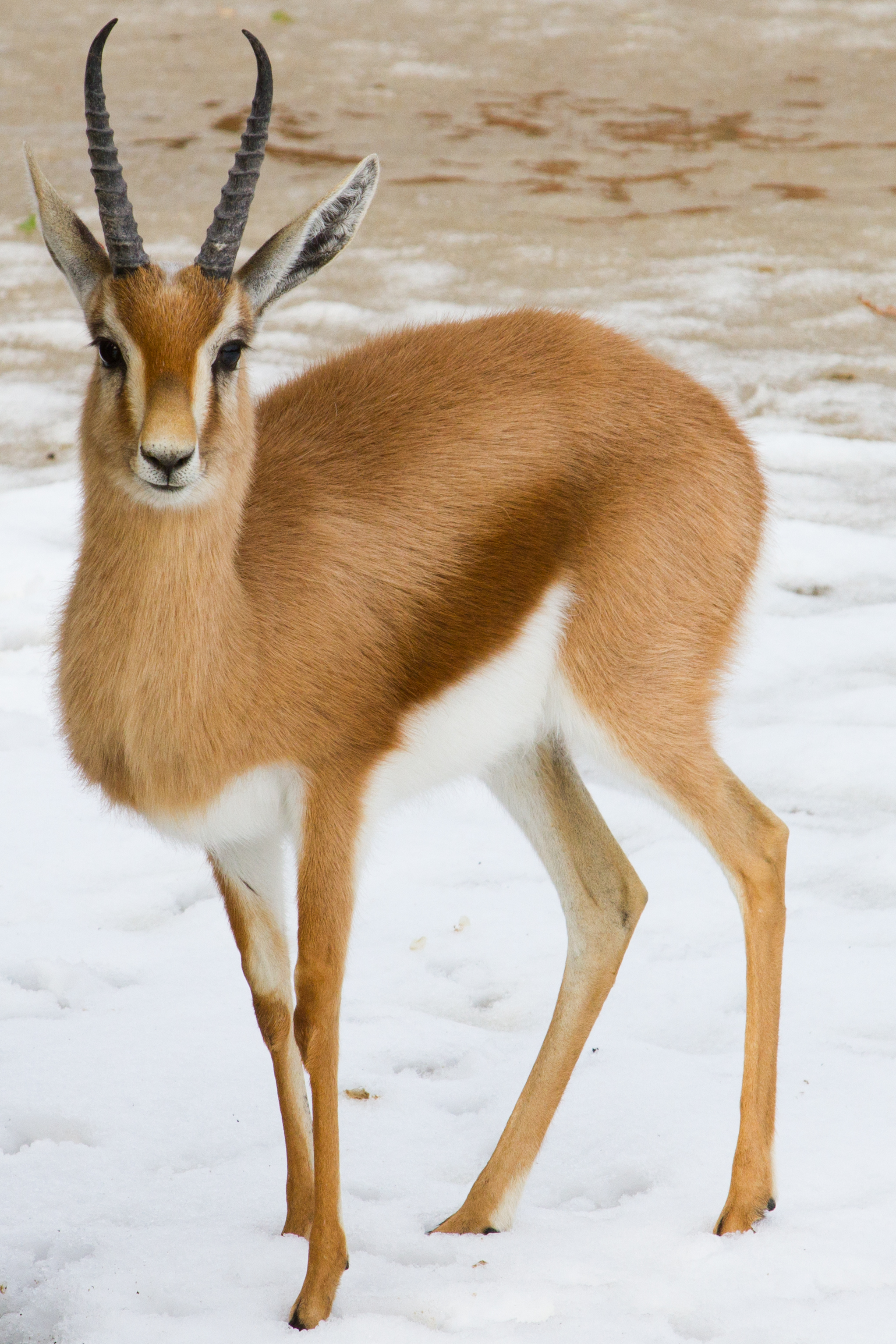
- In Marwell Zoo, UK

Conservation status
- Vulnerable (IUCN 3.1)
- CITES Appendix III

Scientific classification
- Kingdom: Animalia
- Phylum: Chordata
- Class: Mammalia
- Order: Artiodactyla
- Family: Bovidae
- Subfamily: Antilopinae
- Genus: Gazella
- Species: G. dorcas

Binomial name
- Gazella dorcas (Linnaeus, 1758)
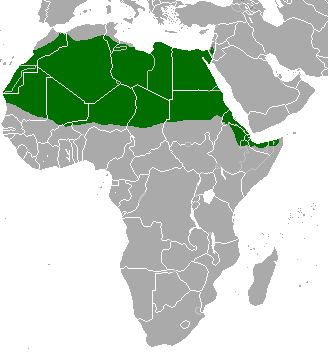
- Gazella dorcas range

Synonyms
- Capra dorcas Linnaeus, 1758

= Dorcas gazelle =

Species of mammal

The dorcas gazelle (Gazella dorcas), also known as the ariel gazelle, is a small and common gazelle. The dorcas gazelle stands about 55–65 cm (1.8–2.1 feet) at the shoulder, with a head and body length of 90–110 cm (3–3.5 feet) and a weight of 15–20 kg (33–44 pounds). The numerous subspecies survive on vegetation in grassland, steppe, wadis, mountain desert and in semidesert climates of Africa and Arabia. About 35,000–40,000 exist in the wild.

== Taxonomy and evolution ==
The scientific name of the dorcas gazelle is Gazella dorcas, the name coming from Ancient Greek δορκάς (dorkas), which referred to a roe deer, gazelle or antelope. It is a member of the genus Gazella and the family Bovidae. The species was first described by Swedish zoologist Carl Linnaeus in the 10th edition of Systema Naturae in 1758.

Although zoologist Theodor Haltenorth considered G. d. pelzelnii to be an independent species, the following six subspecies are identified:

- G. d. beccarii De Beaux, 1931 – Eritrean dorcas gazelle
- G. d. dorcas (Linnaeus, 1758) – Egyptian dorcas gazelle
- G. d. isabella Gray, 1846 – Isabelle dorcas gazelle
- G. d. massaesyla Cabrera, 1928 – Moroccan dorcas gazelle
- G. d. osiris Blaine, 1913 – Saharan (or Saharawi) dorcas gazelle (synonym of G. d. neglecta)
- G. d. pelzelnii Kohl, 1886 – Pelzeln's gazelle
- †G. d. saudiya Carruthers & Schwarz, 1935 - Saudi gazelle
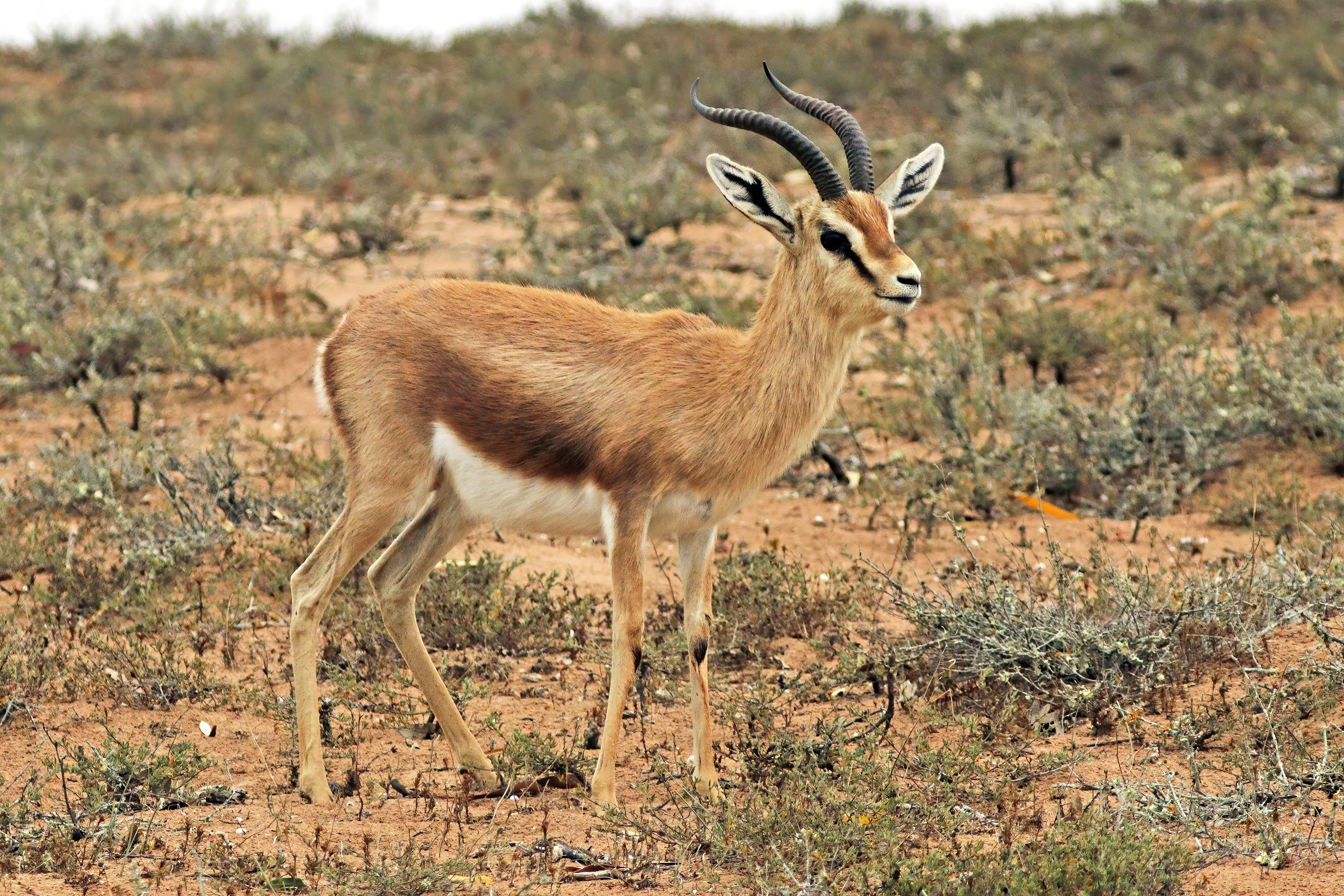
G. d. massaesyla, Souss-Massa National Park, Morocco

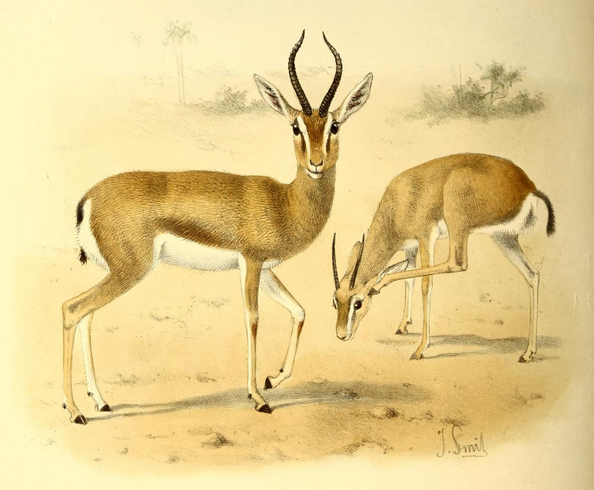
Illustration of G. d. dorcas.

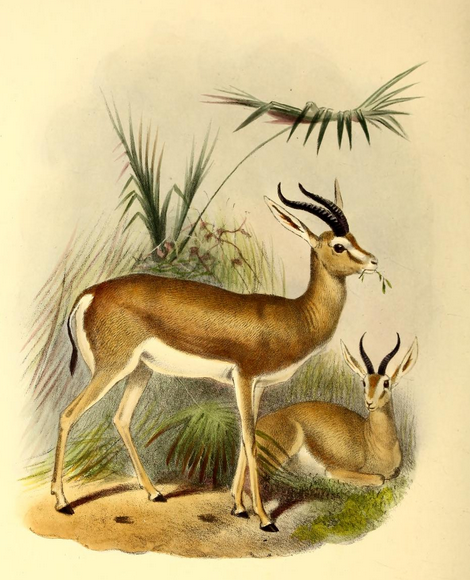
Illustration of G. d. isabella

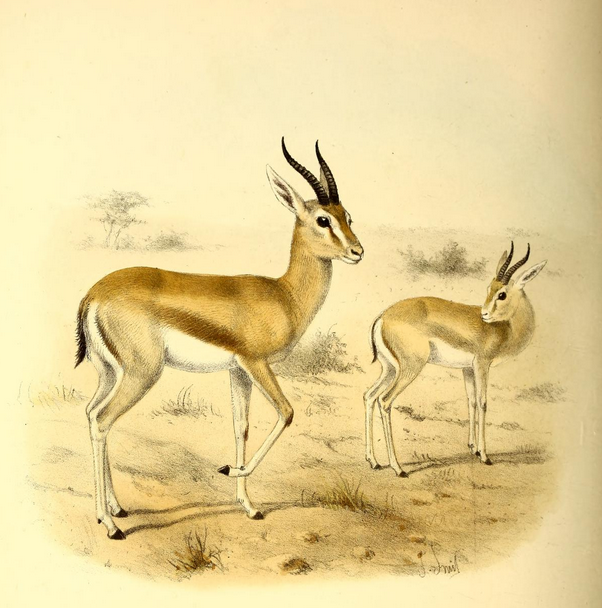
Illustration of G. d. pelzelni

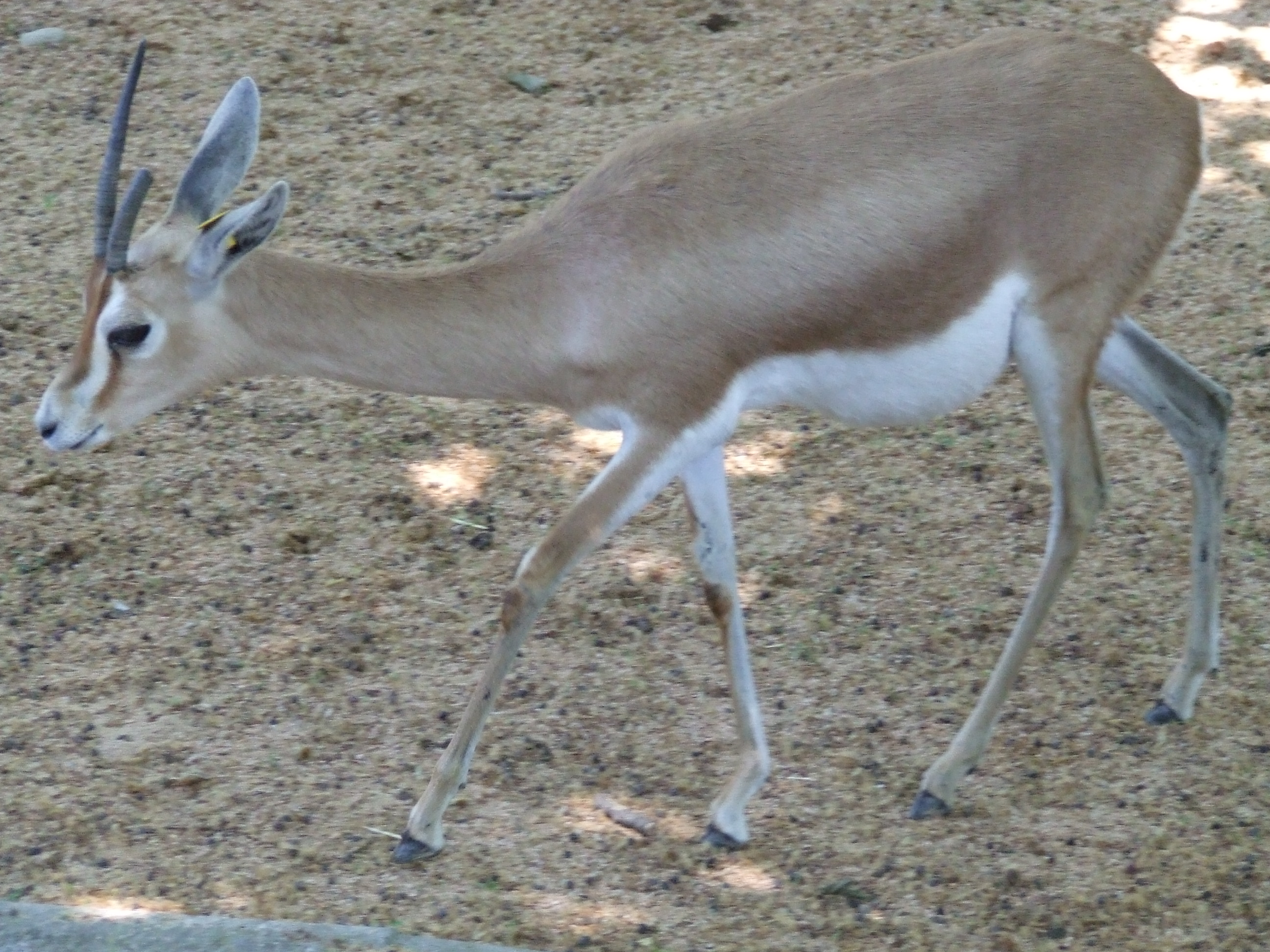
G. d. osiris at Barcelona Zoo

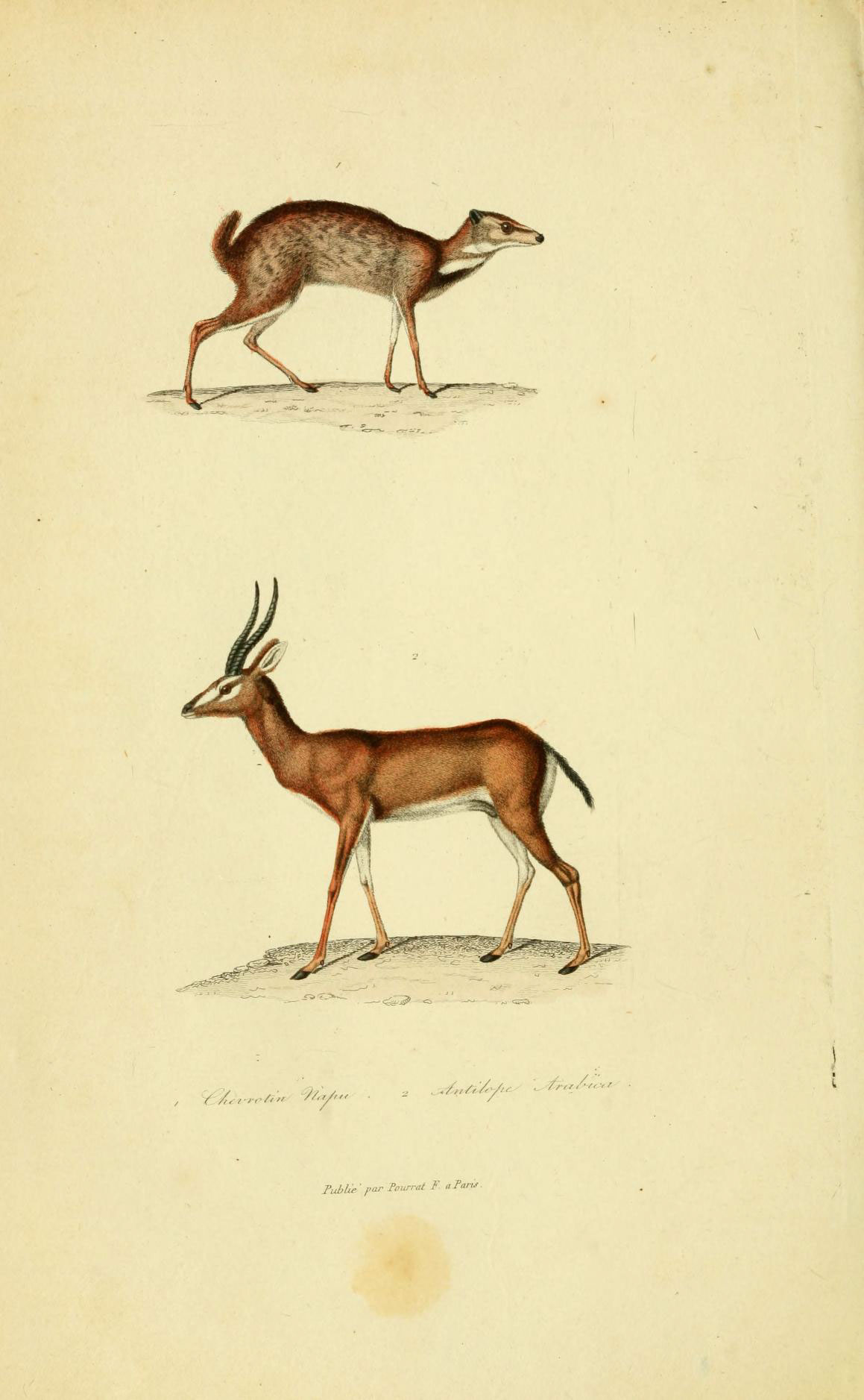
Illustration of G. d. saudiya

== Description ==
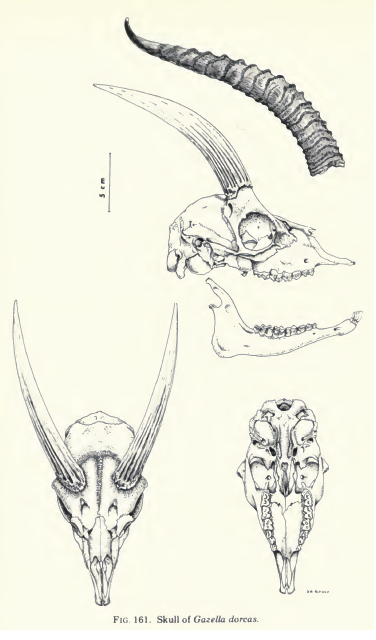
Skull

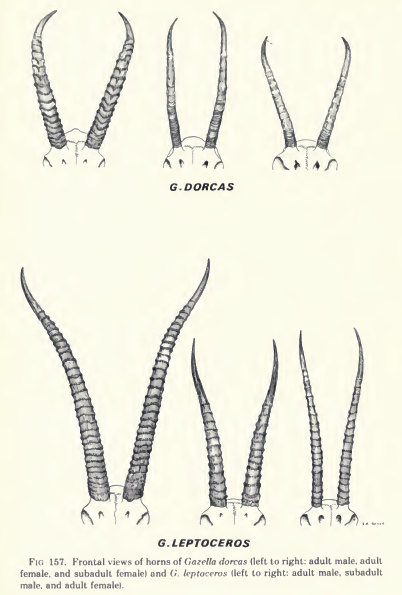
Horns of a dorcas gazelle (above) and rhim gazelle (below)

The dorcas gazelle is similar in appearance to, yet smaller than, the closely related mountain gazelle (G. gazella). Dorcas gazelles have longer ears and more strongly curved horns, which bow outwards then turn inwards and forwards at the tips. Individuals belonging to the Saharan subspecies (G. d. osiris) have very pale, fawn-colored coats. The white underside is bordered with a brown stripe, above which is a sandy stripe. The forehead and face are darker than the body. Subspecies from north of the Sahara tend to be more ochre in color, and have dark flanks and facial stripes. Populations in Israel and around the Red Sea are darker and more reddish. In the last century, the populations of dorcas gazelle were partially destroyed in all the countries where it was found.

Currently, large populations of dorcas gazelles are found in the Negev and the Arava, with other large populations in Sudan, and the southern part of the Eastern Desert of Egypt. In Israel, only 1000–1500 gazelles remain.

== Behaviour ==
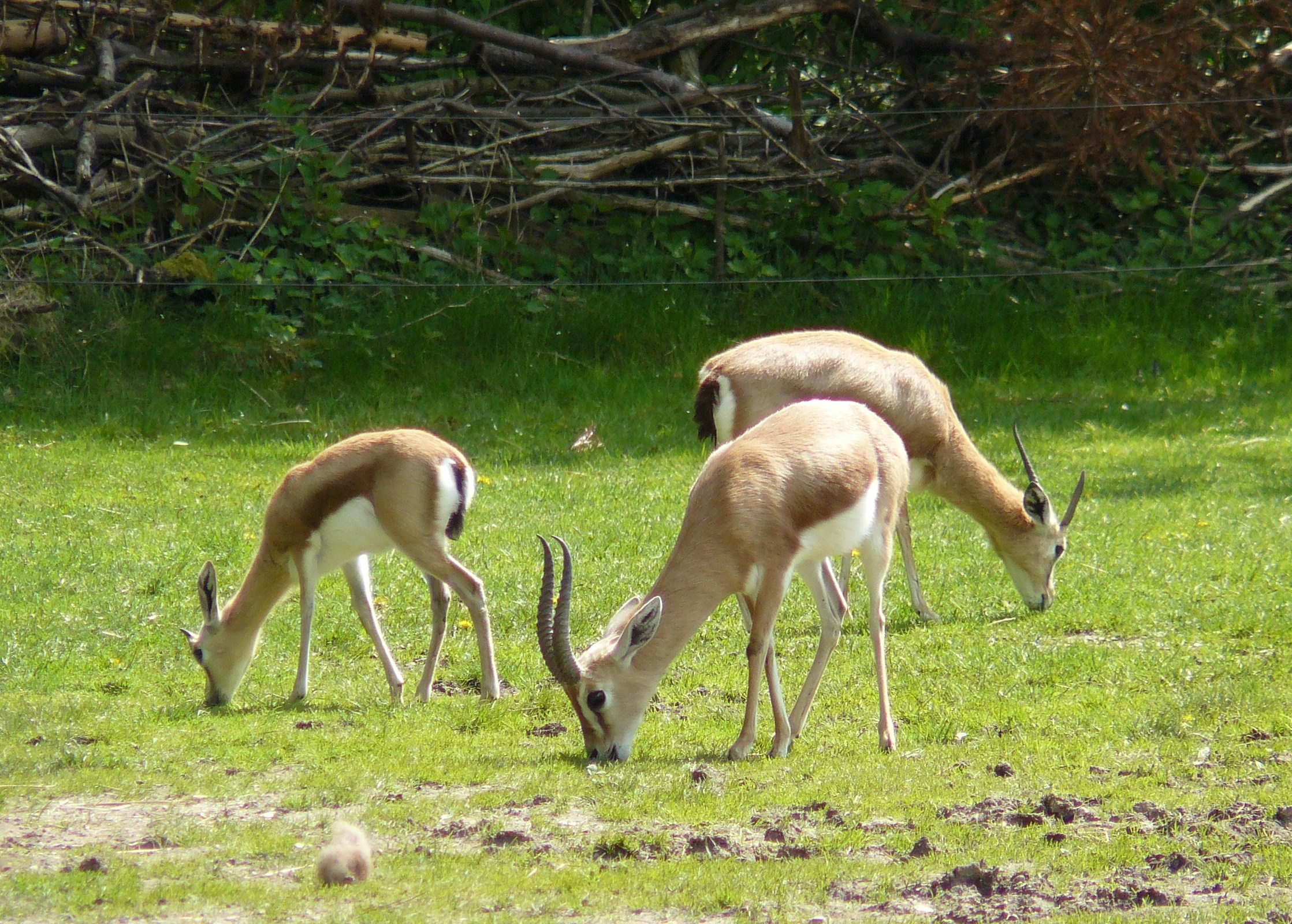
Dorcas gazelles

Dorcas gazelles are highly adapted to life in the desert. They get most of their water from eating succulents, but cannot go their entire lives without drinking water. They look for water sources and drink readily when one is found. They are naturally able to withstand high temperatures and harsh sunlight. Other than evenings when it is very hot, they are active mainly from dusk to dawn. In areas where they face human predation, they tend to be active only at night to avoid falling prey to hunters. These gazelles feed on leaves, flowers, the pods of many species of acacia trees, and the leaves, twigs and fruits of various desert bushes. They occasionally stand on their hind legs to browse through trees and, after rain, have been observed digging bulbs from the ground. Dorcas gazelles can run at speeds up to 80 km/h (50 mph) and may even reach 96 km/h (60 mph). When threatened, they tail-twitch and make bouncing leaps with their heads held high, possibly to announce they have seen a predator.

== Breeding ==
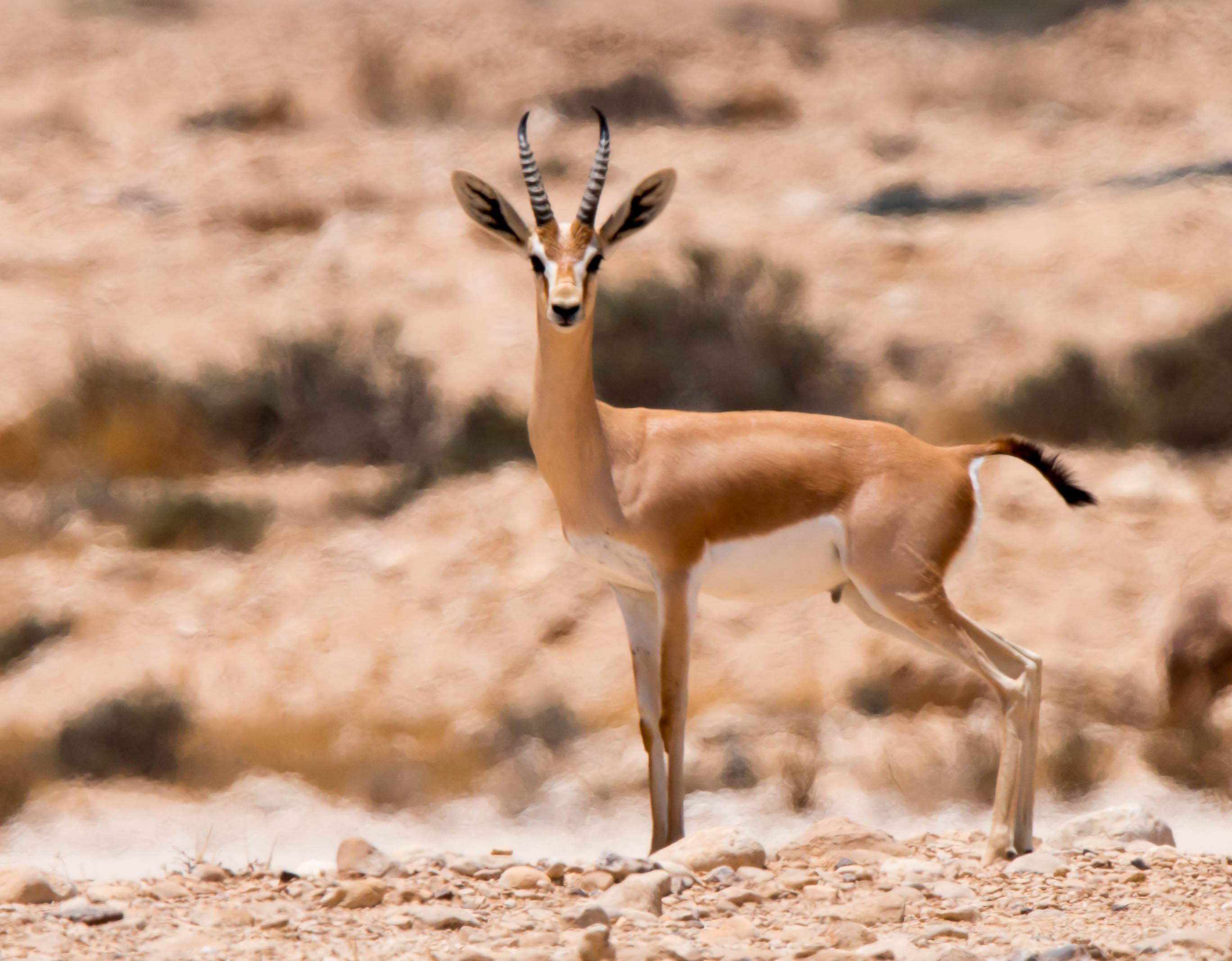
Dorcas gazelles. Ezuz, Israel

When conditions are harsh, dorcas gazelles live in pairs, but when conditions are more favorable, they join together in family herds with one adult male, several females, and young. During the breeding season, adult males tend to be territorial, and mark their range with dung middens. In most parts of their range, mating takes place from September to November. Gestation takes six months; a single fawn is typical, although twins have been reported in Algeria. The newborn is well developed at birth, with fur and open eyes. Within the first hour, the fawn attempts to stand, and it will suckle on this first day of life. In the first two weeks, the young gazelle lies curled up in a scrape on the ground or beneath bushes while the mother grazes close by. The young then starts to follow its mother around and begins to take solid food. After around three months, the fawn stops suckling and is fully weaned. Some dorcas gazelles are also known for their dangerous behaviors when surrounded. There have been many reports of deaths involving them.

== Threats ==
The population of this gazelle has declined throughout its range. Their natural predators include humans, cheetahs, leopards, Arabian wolves, and lions. Due to human hunting, few large cats remain to prey on dorcas gazelles. Mostly unhealthy gazelles are caught successfully by predators, since the healthy gazelles tend to escape them. To escape the cheetah, the fastest of carnivores, they run extremely fast and make zigs-zags, as does the Thomson's gazelle. The serval and caracal also prey on juveniles. The biggest modern threat to this gazelle is ever-expanding human civilization, which shrinks the gazelle's habitat by converting it to farmland, and by introducing new flocks of domestic sheep and goats which compete with gazelles for grassland.

== Trade ==
Dorcas gazelle pelts and horns are traded in Morocco for decorative and medicinal purposes, where they are the most commonly observed ungulate in markets, despite their protected status under Moroccan law. Given the relatively low numbers of wild dorcas gazelles in the country, if locally sourced, this trade could be having a significant negative impact on the local populations of this species.
