= Animals Now =

Israel-based animal-rights activist organization

- אנימלס
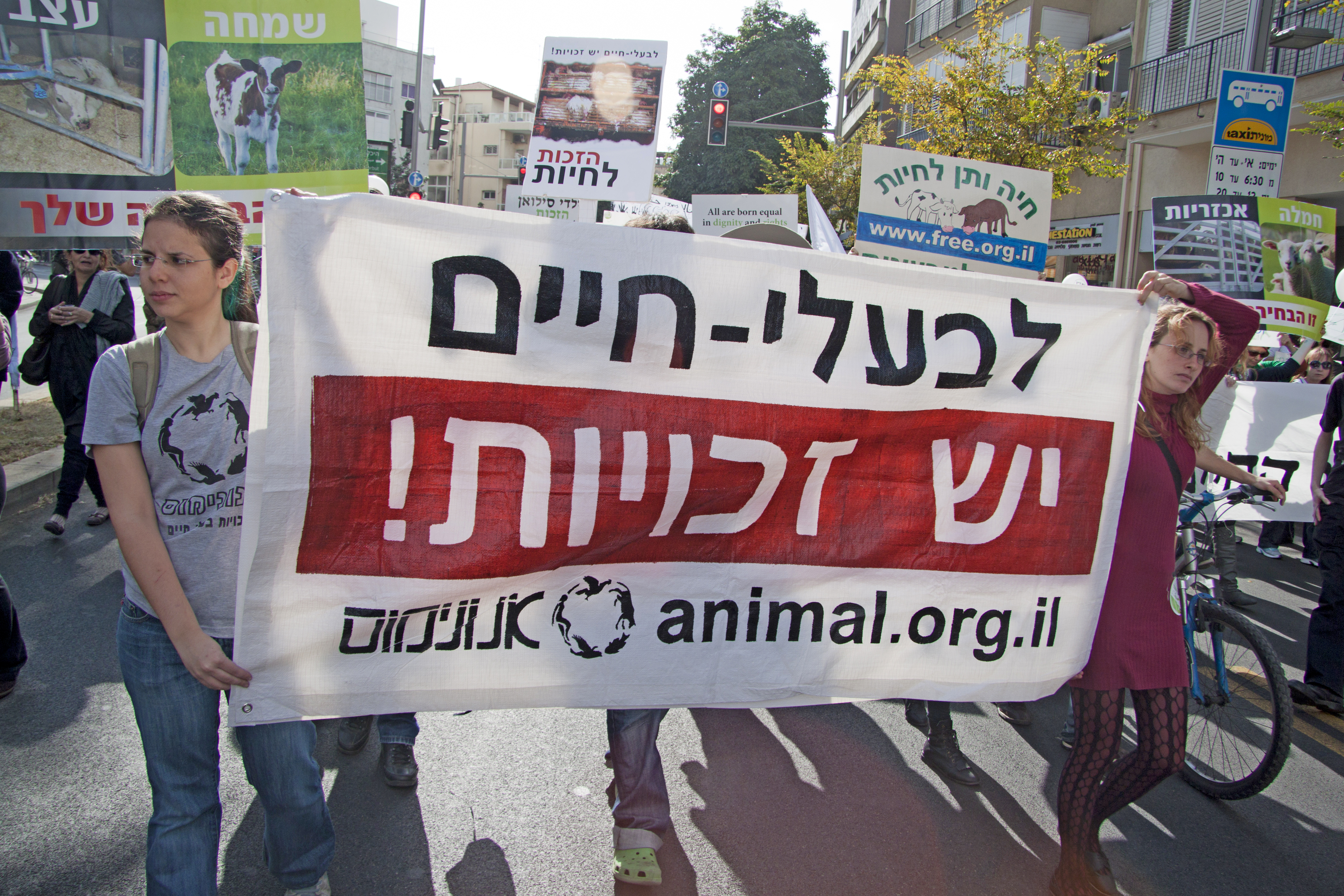
- Anonymous For Animal Rights activists march in Tel Aviv, 2011
- Formation: 1994
- Type: Nonprofit
- Headquarters: Tel Aviv, Israel
- Website: animals-now.org/en/
- Formerly called: Anonymous for Animal Rights

Animals Now (Hebrew: אנימלס, romanized: Animals, formerly Anonymous for Animal Rights) is an animal rights group based in Israel and founded in 1994. It focuses on exposing cruelty in factory farms, promoting legislation to protect animals, and raising public awareness.

== Notable achievements ==
- One of the organization's first major campaigns, against force feeding of geese and ducks, have led to court ruling effectively outlawing force feeding in Israel in 2003. The ban took effect in 2006. After that, the organization continued to pursue legal action against farmers that continued illegally to force feed geese.
- The organization campaigned against keeping calves isolated in individual crates, which do not allow them to move, and against withholding water from calves – both considered standard practices in the veal industry. The campaign led to court ruling outlawing these practices in Israel in 2005.
- In 2014, the organization launched "Challenge 22", a program to introduce people to a vegan lifestyle with support from nutritionists and counselors. Among the program participants were MK Tamar Zandberg and MK Sharren Haskel, both of which became vegans following their participation. After the program's initial launch in Israel, it was also launched internationally.
- Several covert investigations conducted by the organization were broadcast on prime time television, exposing animal abuse in Israel's major meat producing companies, such as Tnuva, Soglowek, Dabah Salah & Sons, and Haifa Slaughterhouse. In some cases, the investigations have led to criminal charges and indictment against workers who were caught abusing animals and to temporary shutdowns of slaughterhouses.
- The organization led a campaign against the use of animals in circuses, which resulted in a nation-wide ban on the use of wild animals in circuses in Israel. Some cities (Tel Aviv, Beersheba and Herzliya) have instituted a ban on the use of domesticated animals as well.
- The organization campaign against live exports has led to a bill to outlaw live exports to Israel.
- A covert investigation that was conducted by the organization in cooperation with PETA India exposed animal abuse in India's egg and poultry industries.
- The organization cooperated with PETA to expose animal abuse on South American slaughterhouses that export meat to Israel. The investigation led rabbinical authorities to instruct kosher slaughterhouses to stop using the shackle and hoist method.
- In 2021 the organization lobbied to end the sale of furs in Israel (except for relegious exemptions).Israel Becomes The 1st Country To Ban The Sale Of Fur Clothing :
- In 2024 the organization succeeded in passing a bill in the Knesset to ban the starvation of hens in order to increase egg production.

== See also ==
- Israel and animal welfare
- List of animal rights groups
