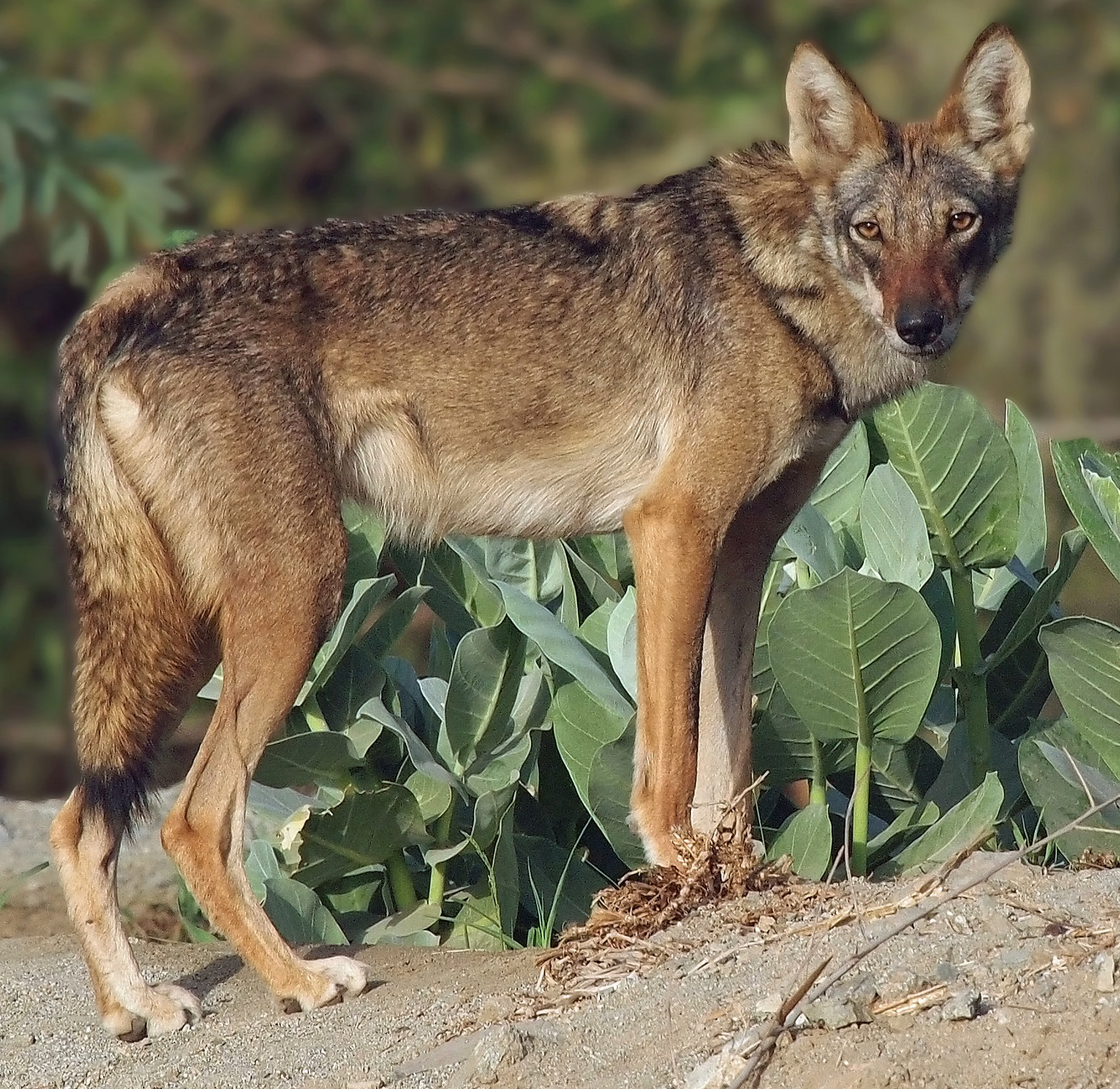

Conservation status
- Endangered (IUCN 3.1)

- Critically Endangered (IUCN 3.1) (by UKWCT)

Scientific classification
- Kingdom: Animalia
- Phylum: Chordata
- Class: Mammalia
- Order: Carnivora
- Family: Canidae
- Genus: Canis
- Species: C. lupus
- Subspecies: C. l. arabs

Trinomial name
- Canis lupus arabs Pocock, 1934
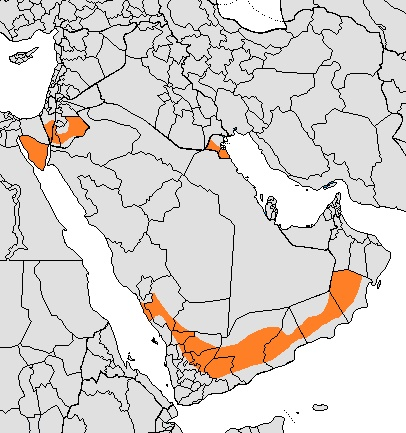
- Arabian wolf range

= Arabian wolf =

Subspecies of the gray wolf

The Arabian wolf (Canis lupus arabs) is a subspecies of gray wolf native to the Arabian Peninsula—to the west of Bahrain, as well as Oman, southern Saudi Arabia, and Yemen. It is also found in Israel’s Negev and Arava Deserts, Jordan, Palestine, and Egypt's Sinai Peninsula. It is the smallest gray wolf subspecies and a specialized xerocole (arid-adapted) animal that normally lives in smaller familial packs. Arabian wolves are omnivorous and opportunistic eaters; they consume small to medium-sized prey, from insects, reptiles and birds to rodents and small ungulates, such as young Nubian ibex and several species of gazelle (Arabian, goitered, dorcas, and mountain gazelles).

== Taxonomy ==
Once thought to be synonymous with the Indian wolf (C. l. pallipes), the Arabian wolf was designated Canis lupus arabs by the British zoologist Reginald Innes Pocock in 1934. Pocock noted its smaller skull and smaller size. In the third edition of Mammal Species of the World published in 2005, the mammalogist W. Christopher Wozencraft listed under the wolf Canis lupus the subspecies Canis lupus arabs. A 2014 study suggests that genetically the Arabian wolf is closer to C. l. lupus than it is to C. l. pallipes and supports the subspecies designation C. l. arabs. There has been admixture with domestic dogs, but it is unclear whether this is why this wolf is genetically closer to C. l. lupus. This raises a concern of extinction by hybridization as Arabian wolves are more adapted to desert life than wolf/dog hybrids.

In Israel and Palestine, there is some disagreement as to the exact taxonomic status of wolves. Some scientists hold that two subspecies of wolf are present: C. l. pallipes in the northern parts and C. l. arabs in the south. They point out that the southern wolves are smaller than the northern wolves, which are also darker and have longer fur. Other scientists consider the wolf in the area to be C. l. arabs, with no real distinction between northern and southern wolves. As in other countries, there is interbreeding with feral dogs, which adds an element of uncertainty.

=== Admixture with other Canis species ===
In 2018, whole genome sequencing was used to compare members of the genus Canis. The study found evidence of gene flow between African wolves, golden jackals, and grey wolves (from Saudi Arabia and Syria). One African wolf from the Egyptian Sinai Peninsula showed high admixture with the Middle Eastern grey wolves and dogs, highlighting the role of the land bridge between the African and Eurasian continents in canid evolution. The African golden wolf was found to be the descendant of a genetically admixed canid of 72% grey wolf and 28% Ethiopian wolf ancestry.

== Description ==
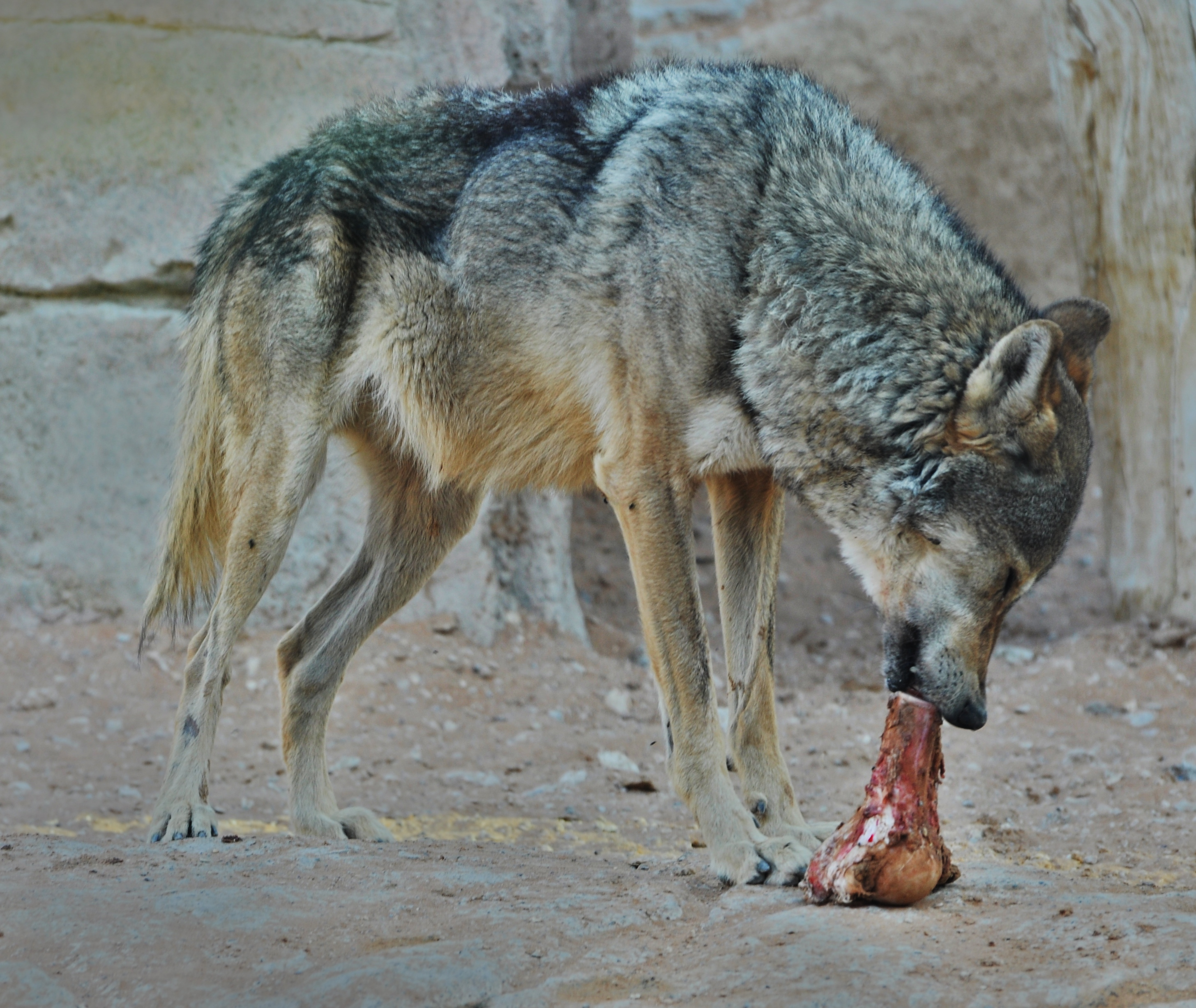
Wolf at Al Ain Zoo, the UAE

The Arabian wolf is one of the smallest subspecies of wolf. It stands on average 64–66 centimetres (25–26 in) at shoulder height and the adult weighs an average of 20 kilograms (45 lb). The cranial length of the adult Arabian wolf measures on average about 20 cm (7.9 in), which is smaller than most wolves. Along with the Indian wolf, it is probably smaller than other wolves to help it adapt to life in a hot, dry climate. This is an example of Bergmann's rule, where mammal size varies by the warmth of their environment. Its ears are proportionally larger in relation to its body size when compared to other sub-species of Canis lupus, an adaptation probably developed to help disperse body heat (Allen's Rule).

They have a short thin coat which is usually a grayish beige color, "... a mixture of black and slightly buffy grey" according to Pocock. Melanistic Arabian wolves have been recorded in Saudi Arabia's western highlands. Similar to other canines, the Arabian wolf does not have sweat glands and so it must control its body temperature by rapid panting, which causes evaporation from the lungs. Occasionally the pads of the third and fourth toes are fused in the back; a feature which differentiates its tracks from a dog's. It is distinguished from the Indian wolf by its smaller skull, smaller size and thinner coat.

== Behavior and ecology ==
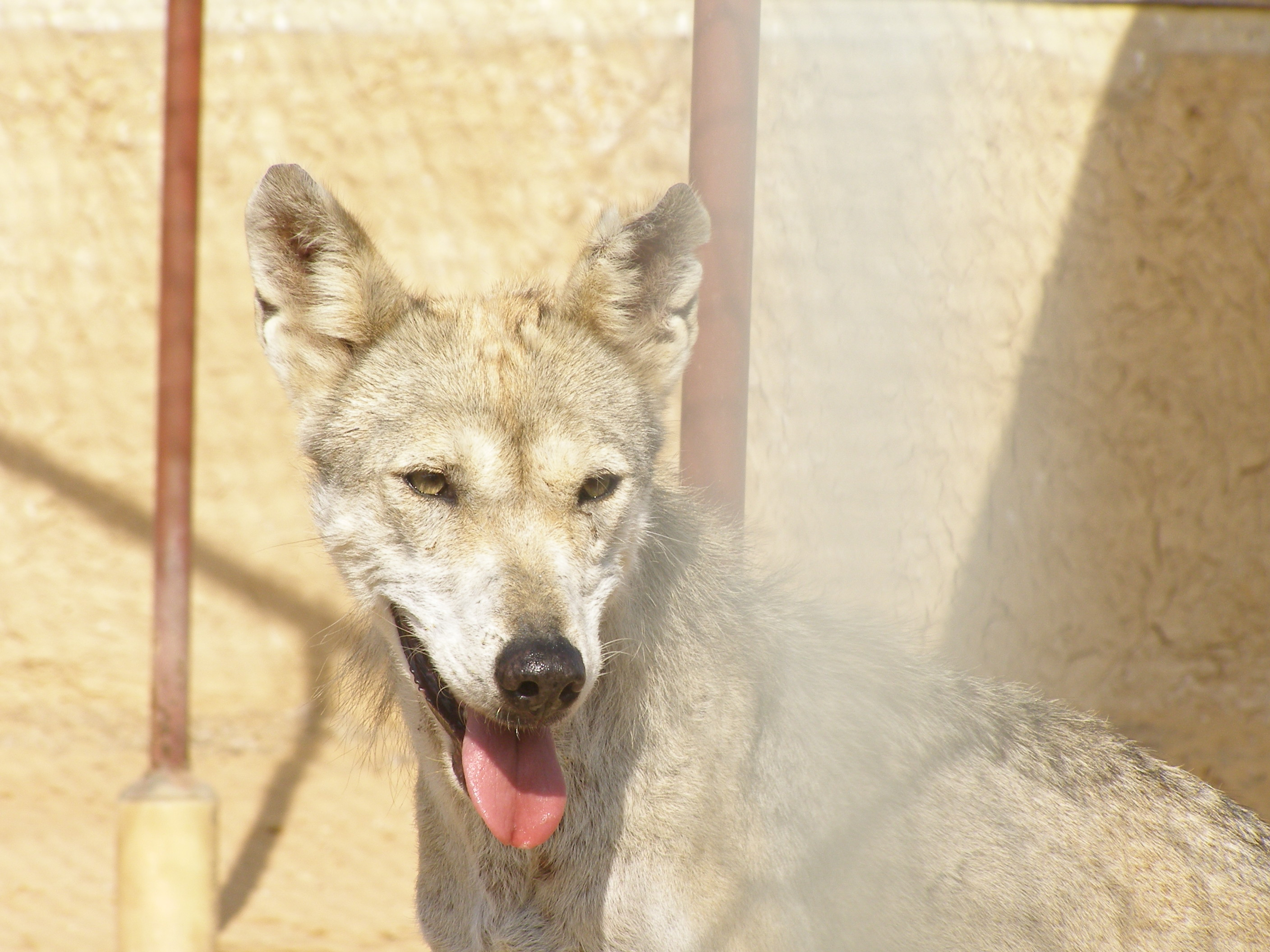
Female head and shoulders

=== Behavior ===
Arabian wolves do not usually live in large packs, and instead hunt in pairs or in groups of about three or four animals. They are most frequently active around water sources at sunrise and mid-afternoon. However, they more commonly travel at night. Due to food availability, Arabian wolves often associate with human settlements.

=== Diet ===
Arabian wolves are mainly carnivorous, but also omnivorous and in some areas largely dependent on human garbage and excess products. Their native prey includes ungulates such as Nubian ibex (Capra nubiana), gazelles (Genus Gazella), and Persian onager (Equus hemionus onager), as well as smaller animals like hares, rodents, small birds, and reptiles. They also eat cats, sweet fruits, roadkill and other carrion. Opportunistically, almost any small animal including fish, snails, baby baboons can be part of their diet. Because Arabian wolves can attack and eat any domestic animals up to the size of a goat, pastoral Bedouins and other farmers will often shoot, poison, or trap them.

=== Other wildlife interactions ===
There is at least one case in Israel of a striped hyena (Hyaena hyaena) associating and cooperating with a wolf pack. It is proposed that this is a case of mutualism: the hyena could benefit from the wolves' superior ability to hunt large, agile prey. The wolves could benefit from the hyena's superior sense of smell, to locate and dig out tortoises, to crack open large bones, and to tear open discarded food containers like tin cans.

As with other wolf subspecies, Arabian wolves can facilitate a trophic cascade by suppressing smaller carnivores such as golden jackals (Canis aureus) and foxes (Genus Vulpes). This allows smaller herbivores to become more abundant. Arabian wolves compete with other carnivores including the caracal (Caracal caracal) and Arabian leopard (Panthera pardus nimr). Historically they also competed with the Asiatic cheetah (Acinonyx jubatus venaticus) and the Asiatic lion (Panthera leo persica), but these species are now extinct within the Arabian wolf's range.

== Range and conservation ==
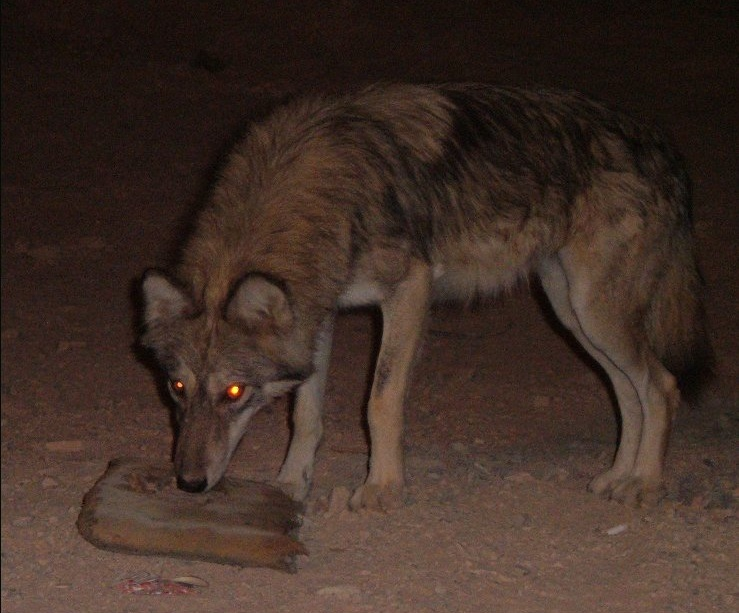
An Arabian wolf in the Arava desert, southern Israel

The Arabian wolf was once found throughout the Arabian Peninsula, but now lives only in small pockets in southern Israel, Palestine, Oman, Yemen, Jordan, Saudi Arabia, and some parts of the Sinai Peninsula in Egypt. It is rare throughout most of its range because of human persecution. There is connectivity between the wolf populations of Egypt, Israel, and Jordan as wolves often cross borders between these countries.

In Oman, wolf populations have increased because of a ban on hunting, and they may naturally re-establish themselves in certain places within the region in the relatively near term.

In Israel, between 100 and 150 Arabian wolves are found across the Negev and the Arava. The population is stable, as prey is abundant and much of the land is undeveloped and protected as nature reserves. They find additional food and water in agricultural areas near human settlements. They are strongly protected under Israel's 1955 Wildlife Protection Law.

The United Arab Emirates and Egypt maintain captive breeding programs. The wolf is protected in Oman and Israel. Certain areas within Saudi Arabia offer protected status, and the Arabian wolf still exists in places with sparse human activity.
