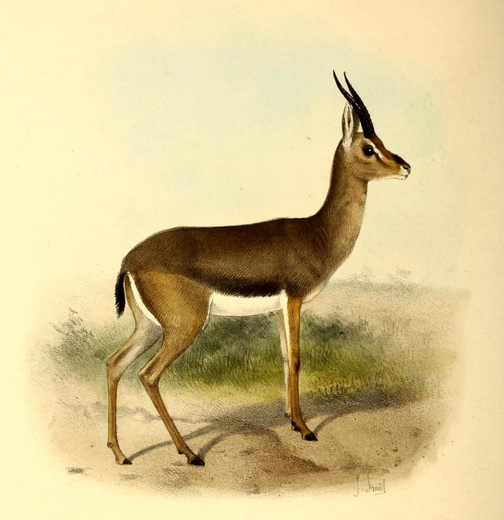

Conservation status
- Vulnerable (IUCN 3.1)

Scientific classification
- Kingdom: Animalia
- Phylum: Chordata
- Class: Mammalia
- Order: Artiodactyla
- Family: Bovidae
- Subfamily: Antilopinae
- Genus: Gazella
- Species: G. arabica

Binomial name
- Gazella arabica Lichtenstein, 1827
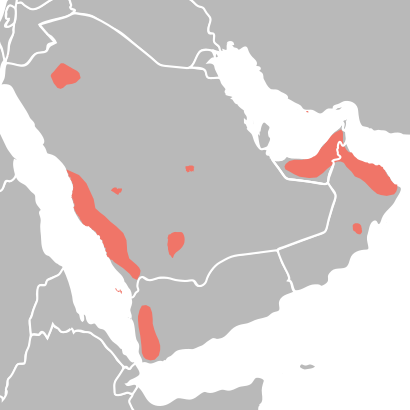
- Gazella arabica distribution

Synonyms
- Gazella gazella acaciae (Mendelssohn, Groves & Shalmon, 1997); Gazella gazella cora (Hamilton Smith, 1827); Gazella gazella farasani (Thouless & Al-Bassri, 1991); Gazella gazella muscatensis (Brooke, 1874); Gazella gazella erlangeri; Gazella erlangeri Neumann, 1906

= Arabian gazelle =

Species of mammal

The Arabian gazelle (Gazella arabica) is a species of gazelle from the Arabian Peninsula. There are approximately 5,000 – 7,000 mature individuals in the wild. It is now synonymous with Gazella erlangeri, commonly known as Erlanger's gazelle or Neumann's gazelle.

== Taxonomy ==
Until recently, it was only known from a single lectotype specimen mistakenly thought to have been collected on the Farasan Islands in the Red Sea in 1825. A 2013 genetic study of the lectotype specimen revealed that skull and skin do not stem from the same individual but belong to two distinct lineages of the mountain gazelle (Gazella gazella), necessitating restriction of the lectotype to the skin to conserve nomenclatural stability. A later study formalized the use of Gazella arabica for the Arabian lineage of the mountain gazelle, and synonymized Gazella erlangeri with G. arabica.

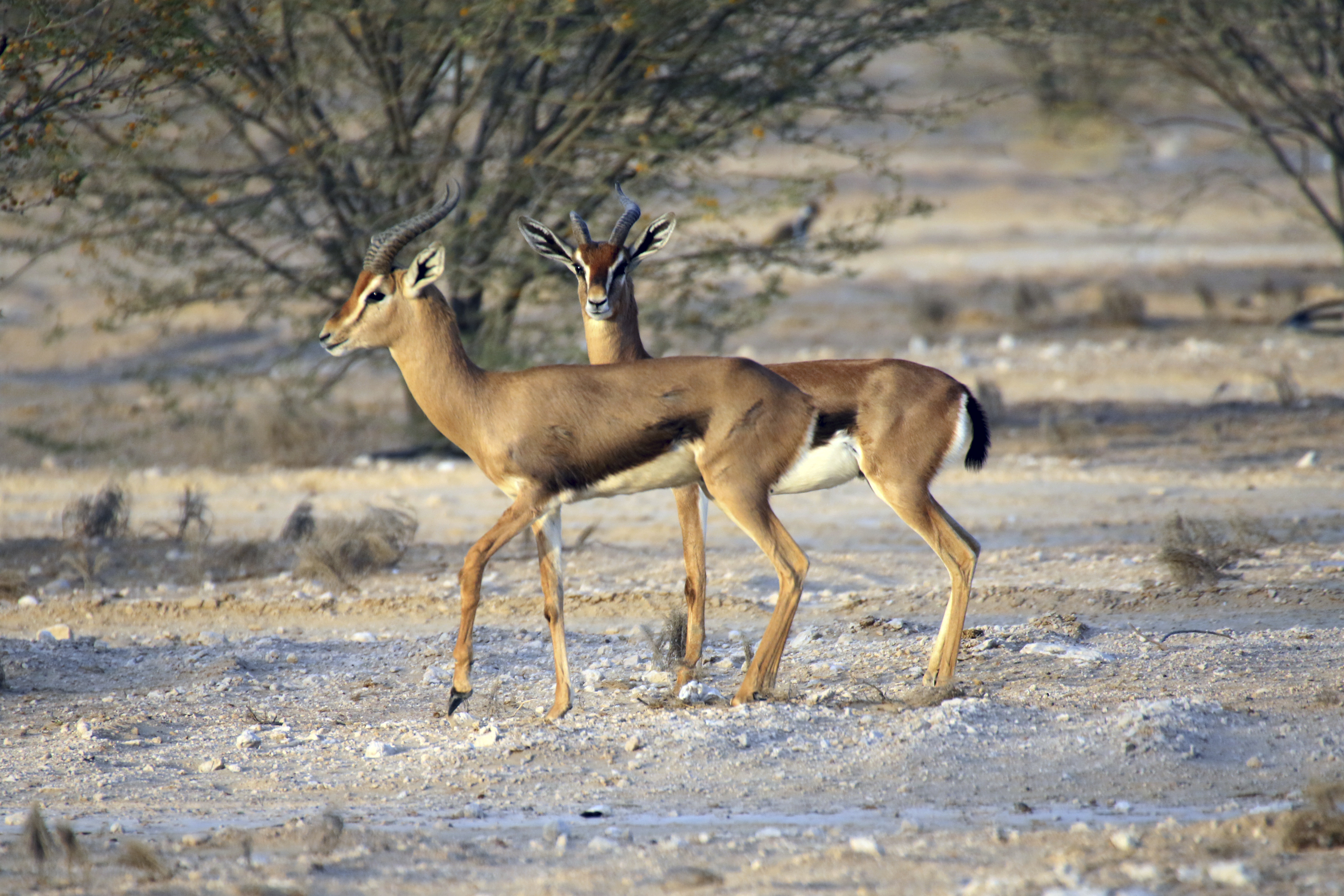
Arabian gazelles

== Ecology and behavior ==
=== Ecology ===
The Arabian gazelle lives in grassland, shrubland, and desert habitat types. They predominantly feed on the leaves, flowers, and fruits of acacia trees (Genus Vachellia) and other trees and shrubs. Arabian gazelles are selective browsers, preferring woody plants over grasses. They predominantly feed on all fours, but may rear up on their hind legs to access higher food. They share their habitat with many other herbivores, including Dorcas gazelles (Gazella dorcas), mountain gazelles (Gazella gazella), Nubian ibex (Capra nubiana), Asiatic wild ass (Equus hemionus), and Arabian oryx (Oryx leucoryx). Their main predators are Arabian wolves (Canis lupus arabs).

Arabian gazelles are crepuscular, most active in the early morning and evening when temperatures are cooler. In the heat of midday, they rest to chew their cud.

They have been found with antibodies to the parasite toxoplasmosis (Toxoplasma gondii). They contract gastrointestinal diseases including clostridiosis and salmonellosis, as well as chronic renal fibrosis.

=== Reproduction ===
Offspring survival becomes more likely as birth weight increases, and birth weight is more reliant on heritability than on maternal effects.

== Conservation ==
The Arabian gazelle is classified as Vulnerable by the International Union for the Conservation of Nature (IUCN). The population is declining: estimated at 12,000 mature individuals in 2008, the species now numbers approximately 5,000 to 7,000 as of 2016.

There are many environmental factors affecting the population density of Arabian gazelles, such as human hunting, predation, competition, and climate change. The decline in population is due to human disturbances such as construction, livestock competition, capture for the pet trade, and illegal hunting. Other factors include temperature change, and predation (mainly by wolves); as the researchers stated in their findings that, "Wolf encounter rate had a significant negative effect on G. arabica population size, while G. dorcas population size had a significant positive effect, suggesting that wolf predation shapes the population size of both gazelle species."

=== Iran ===
A natural relict population occurs on Farur Island in the Persian Gulf. Genetic evidence indicates that the population became isolated after post-glacial sea level rise approximately 10,000 years ago, rather than being introduced by humans.

==== Israel ====
A relict population of approximately 30 Arabian gazelles lives in Israel's Arava Valley. Known locally as "Acacia gazelles", they are protected in a fenced enclosure at the Yotvata Hai-Bar Nature Reserve. There is some evidence that they face browsing competition from the Dorcas gazelles that share their enclosure, which has prompted the relocation of many Dorcas gazelles.

==== Oman ====
In the 1990s, Oman's population was approximately 13,000 individuals, the majority living in the Jiddat al-Harasis. However, the population has been in continuous decline since then due to poaching. They live in several nature reserves, including the Arabian Oryx Sanctuary, Wadi Sareen Tahr Reserve, Jebel Samhan Nature Reserve, and Al Saleel National Park. In 2023 a small population was discovered on Masirah Island.

==== Saudi Arabia ====
Saudi Arabia has approximately 1,500–1,700 individuals, of which 1,000 live on the Farasan Islands, which are protected as a nature reserve. The Farasan Island gazelles are surveyed by the National Commission for Wildlife Conservation and Development every 2–3 years. They are protected in other nature reserves, including the Ibex Reserve and Uruq Bani Ma'arid.

==== United Arab Emirates ====
The United Arab Emirates contains several small and scattered populations. A 2023 survey identified 421 individuals at the Dubai Desert Conservation Reserve. The report noted a 43% population decline relative to a similar survey conducted two years prior.

==== Yemen ====
Arabian gazelles are present in Yemen, but no recent population estimate has been published because ongoing conflict has limited wildlife surveys and conservation monitoring.

== See also ==
- List of mammals of Saudi Arabia
- Saudi gazelle
