= Al Saleel National Park =

Wildlife reserve in Oman

- Location within Oman
- Location: Sharqiyah, Oman
- Coordinates: 22.363°N 59.197°E
- Area: 220 km^{2} (85 sq mi)

The Al Saleel National Park is a wildlife reserve in the Sharqiyah region of Oman.

The park extends over an area of 220 square kilometres (85 sq mi), and is predominantly covered by forests of acacia trees. It is home to a number of rare species such as the Arabian gazelle, the Omani wild cat (“Al Senmar”) (Felis silvestris gordoni) and other animals which have made this environment their home, including the red fox, the Egyptian eagle (Neophron percnopterus) and others.

== See also ==
- List of protected areas of Oman
