= Dung midden =

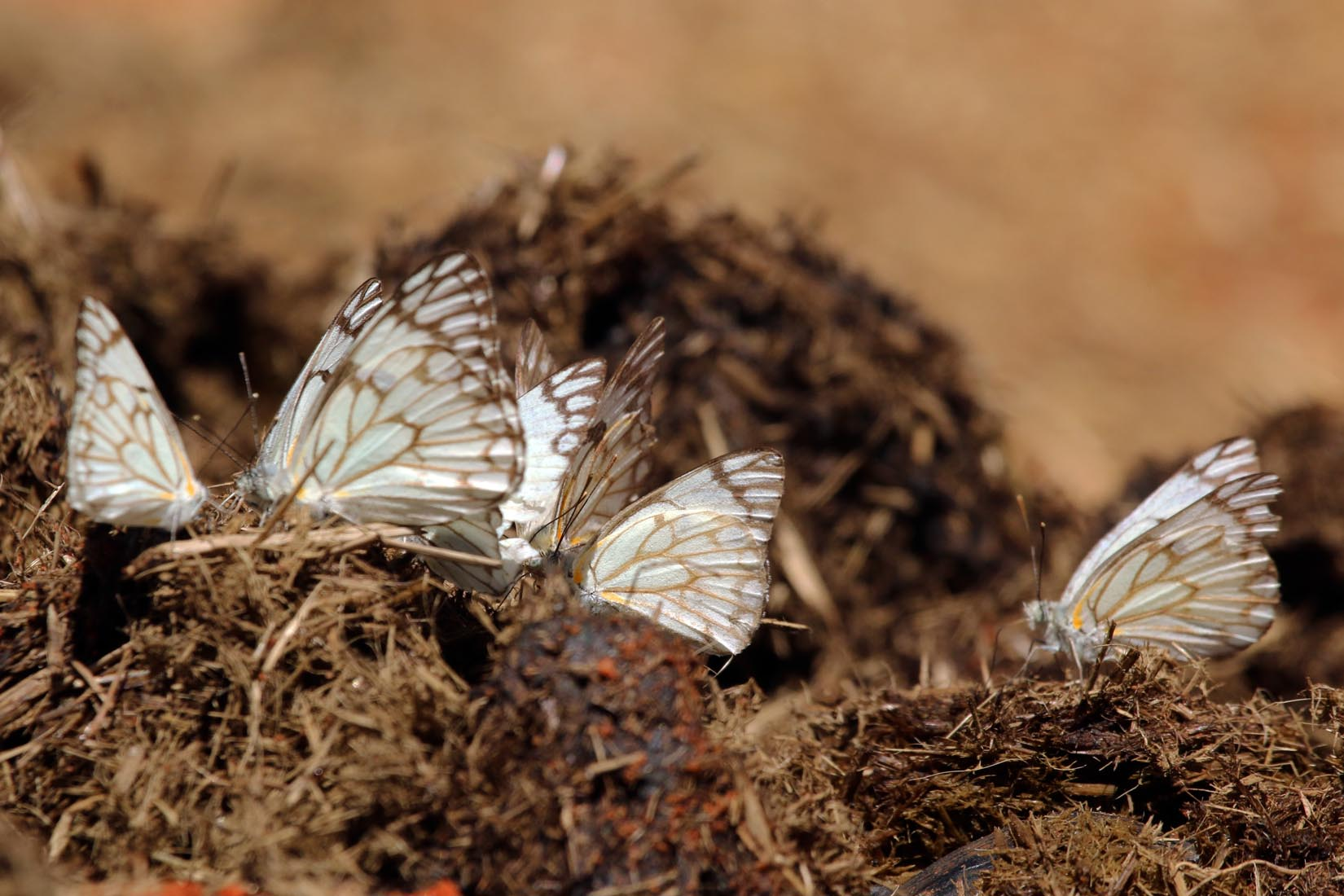
Brown-veined white butterflies (Belenois aurota aurota) on white rhino dung, Tswalu Kalahari Reserve, South Africa

Dung middens, also known as dung hills, are piles of dung that mammals periodically return to and build up. They are used as a form of territorial marker. A range of animals are known to use them including steenbok, hyrax, and rhinoceros. Other animals are attracted to middens for a variety of purposes, including finding food and locating mates. Some species, such as the dung beetle genus Dicranocara of the Richtersveld in South western Africa spend their whole lifecycle in close association with dung middens. Dung middens are also used in the field of paleobotany, which relies on the fact that each ecosystem is characterized by certain plants, which in turn act as a proxy for climate. Dung middens are useful as they often contain pollen which means fossilized dung middens can be used in paleobotany to learn about past climates.

== Examples of dung midden production in wild ==
=== Hippopotamus ===
The common hippopotamus has been known to use dung middens as a social tool. The middens are created and maintained by bulls to mark territorial boundaries. To mark their scent upon a midden, the bull will approach the midden in reverse and simultaneously defecate and urinate on the mound, using its tail to disperse, or paddle, the excrement. This action is called dung showering and thought to assert dominance. The middens, usually several feet across, are constantly maintained during the bulls' travels in the night and day.

=== Rhinoceros ===
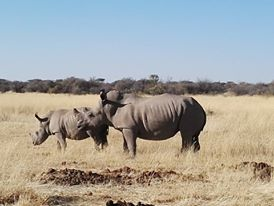
Rhinos in Namibia. Rhinos have been known to produce middens that can be 65 feet across.

Dung-midden production is also observed in the white and black rhinoceroses. The middens are shown to provide cues as to the age, sex, and reproductive health of the producer. Some of the middens can be 65 feet across. Dung beetles are frequently found in these middens and lay their eggs within the mounds. Their presence and activity in the middens also aid in pest and parasite control. Unlike the hippopotamus, rhino dung middens are shared between individuals that are not necessarily related.

White rhino middens are distinguished by a black color and a primarily grass composition whereas black rhino middens tend to be brown and contain more twigs and branches, a product of the distinct diets.

=== Black garden ants ===
Midden formation in insects was first observed in black garden ants, Lasius niger. The middens created by the ants are called "kitchen middens" and are composed of food scraps, ant corpses, and other detritus.

=== Lemurs ===
The dry bush weasel lemur and southern gentle lemur are known to construct middens. It is thought that these act primarily as communal latrines and communication tools, signaling dominance and other social cues, for families spread over large tracts of land.

=== Hyraxes ===
Hyrax, or Procavia, are small herbivorous mammals from across the African continent and normally inhabit in rock shelters, not typically wandering more than 500 meters from their shelter for fear of predation. These organisms use fixed dung middens for urinating and defecation, often under overhanging rocks in protected areas. Layers of dung are quickly hardened and sealed by Hyraceum, creating mainly horizontal middens.

=== Antelopes ===
Middens created by antelopes, as well as other herbivores, play an important role by providing nutrients to certain areas of land. It has been described that duiker and steenbok antelopes defecate in exposed sites, generally on sandy soil, thus enriching the nutrient-deficient areas, as well as depositing plant seed there.

==== Mountain gazelles ====
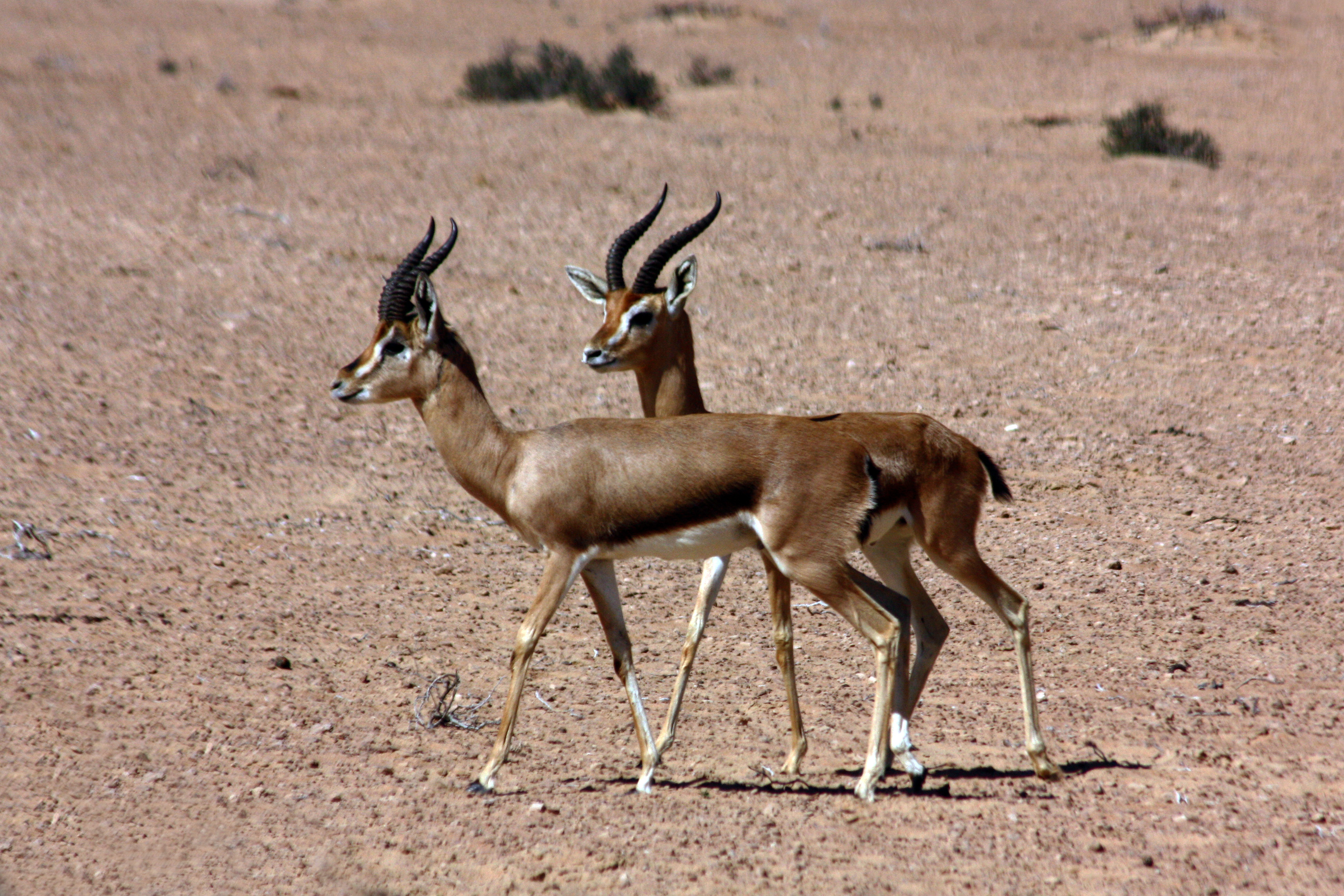
Mountain gazelle in the Dubai Desert Conservation Area, UAE. It appears that middens have olfactory importance for mountain gazelles.

Many gazelle species use middens (see also Animal latrine) for activities related to territory maintenance, advertisement and olfactory communication. Due to the investment required to maintain a midden, it is likely that middens would not be randomly placed throughout the environment, but rather would be distributed on different landmarks. Placing middens on conspicuous sites could attract the attention of hunters and provide the hunters with information about the location and activity of their prey. A group of researchers examined midden selection and use by mountain gazelles (Gazella gazelle) in central Saudi Arabia and hypothesized that if middens are used for territorial or communication purposes, then they would tend to be placed at the largest trees in the immediate area. Additionally, if mountain gazelle midden selection and use was predictable, then this would corroborate poachers' claims that gazelles are easy to hunt because of their predictable behavior. Ultimately it was found that midden size and the freshness of newly deposited feces could inform poachers about the gazelles' rates of midden use and potentially which middens are used more often. It was also found that middens are important communication centers for the mountain gazelles, and they are used by both sexes and by gazelles of various ages.

== Ecological implications ==
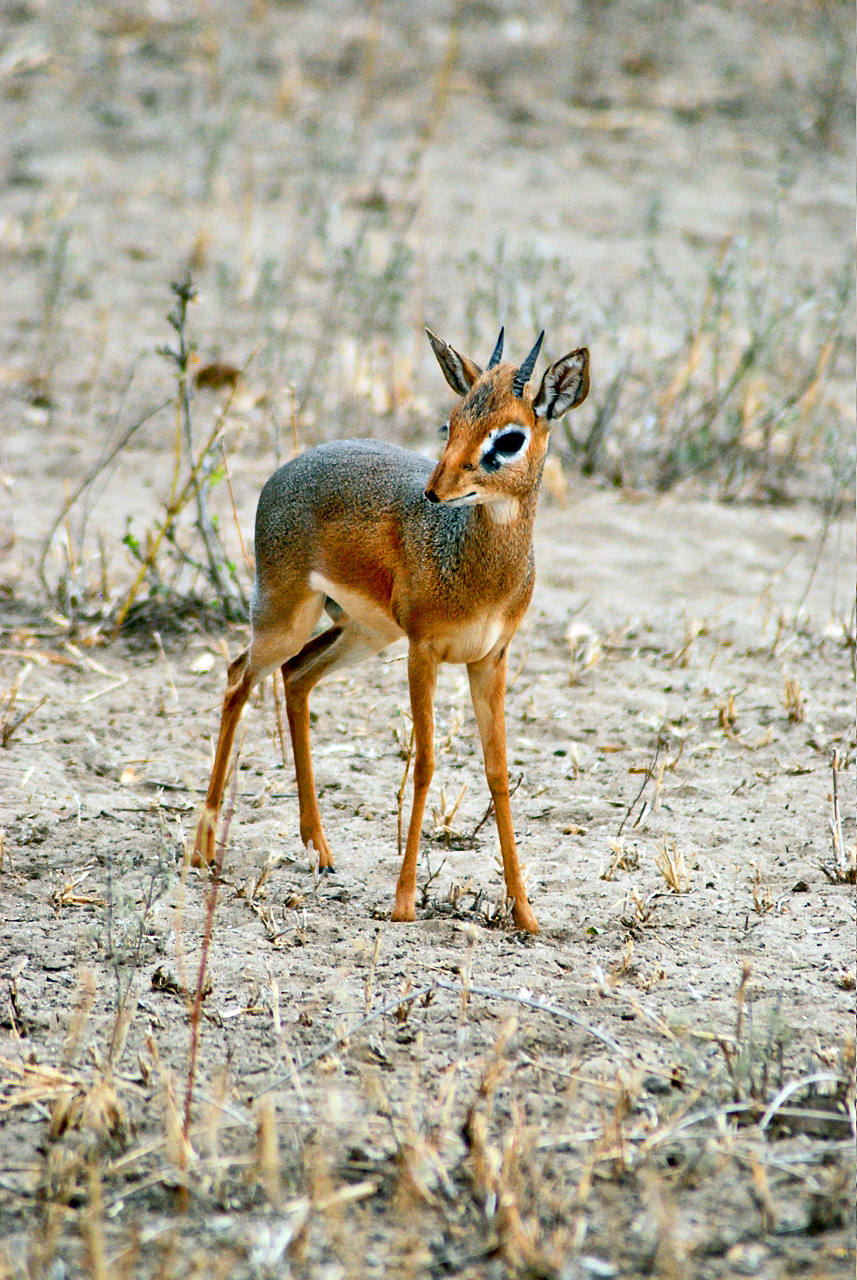
Dik-dik in Tarangire National Park, Tanzania. This species of ungulate utilizes dung middens as territory markers and have been implied to use middens in anti-parasite behavior via fecal avoidance.

The widespread presence of dung midden use throughout the animal kingdom is coupled with a distinct variation in how dung middens are used from species to species. Dung midden use has been implicated in the context of both intraspecific markers of territory, sexual availability, and a part of anti-parasite behavior, but also as an essential part of the ecosystem, with interspecies interactions between the creators and users of dung midden piles. In some cases, it has been found that midden piles are the focal points of grazing lawns, not the other way around, as demonstrated by high frequency of grazing when old middens are present.

=== Intraspecific markers of territory ===
Territory or home-range maintenance is found in many species of animals as a way to divide resources, including food and mates. Often markers are employed to define such territories, and dung middens are one form of the markers employed. An example of dung midden use for territorial marking is found in the mountain gazelle, in which latrines/dung middens are found in the home-range cores and serve as a concentrated area to repel intruders while facilitating communication amongst the members of the female group. This method of dung midden use is distinct from other species such as the Thornson's gazelle and the Günther's dik-dik, both of which use dung middens as peripheral territory markers instead.

=== Sexual availability ===
Olfactory communication through dung middens can also indicate sexual availability to conspecifics. In white rhino dung, a mixture of volatile organic compounds present signal the defecator's sex and age class, and depending on whether they are a male or female, also indicate the male territorial status or female oestrous state. Furthermore, dung middens act as a communication center for white rhino groups since the species practices communal defecation, allowing for these signals to easily reach potential mates.

=== Anti-parasite behavior ===
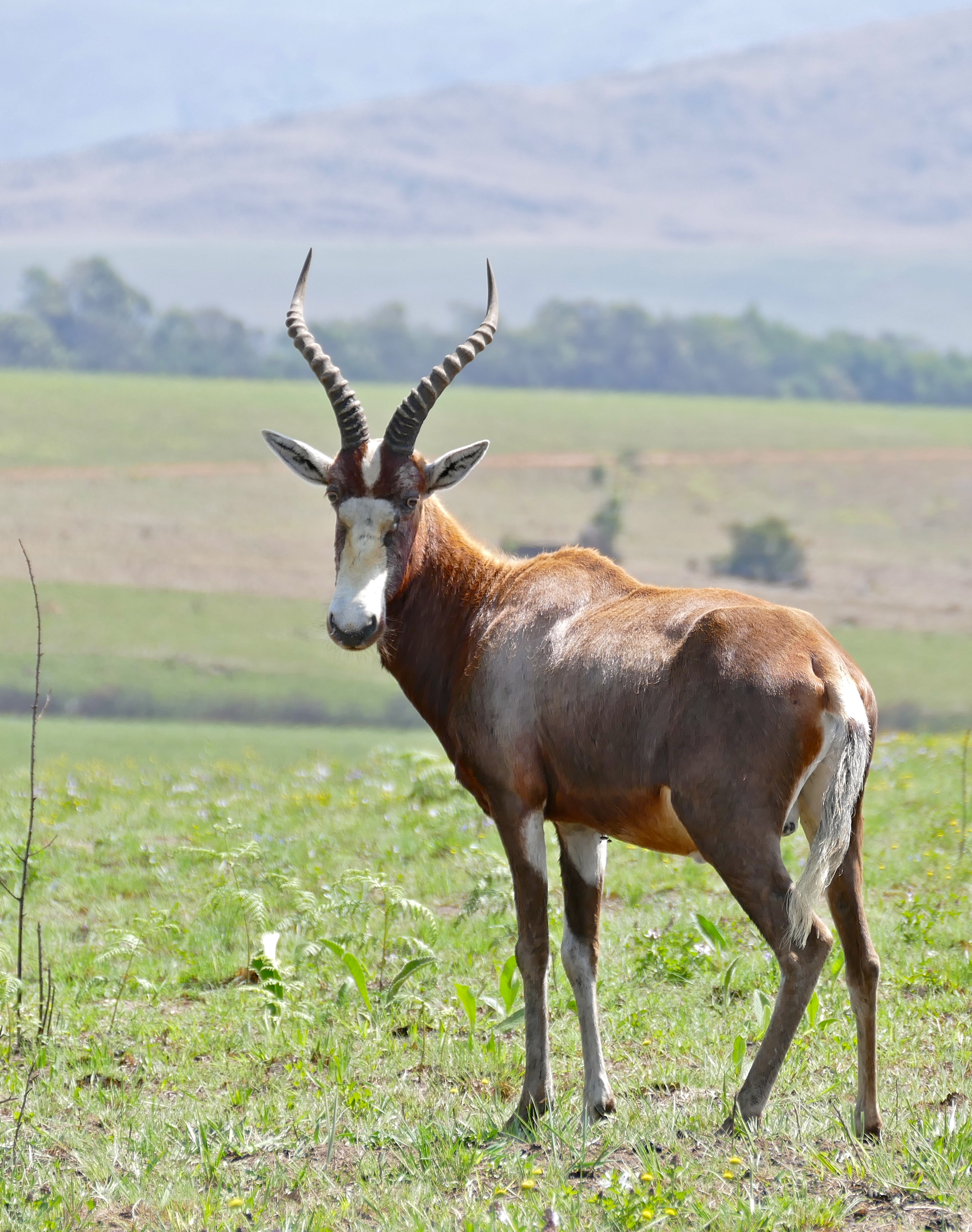
Blesbok in Malolotja Nature Reserve, Eswatini. Dung midden from this species is cycled through the local ecosystem through its interactions with harvester termites.

Dung with high parasite loads are a significant source of fecal-oral transmitted parasites, which impose a high cost on individual fitness in wild ungulates. Quantifying studies of parasite loads in dung midden piles of free ranging dik-dik found that nematode concentrations were elevated in the vicinity of middens in comparison to single fecal-pellet groups or dung-free areas. Further feeding experiments found that the dik-diks tend to avoid the areas around dung middens when feeding, implying selective defecation and selective foraging where fecal avoidance could play a part in anti-parasite behavior in this species.

=== Mammalian-termite interactions ===
Termites are usually viewed as both herbivores and decomposers when present within an ecological community. In some cases, they are the link between mammalian consumers and the microbial decomposers that perform the final breaking down of organic matter within the local cycle of nutrients. A case of this relationship between termites and mammalian dung middens is observed in South Africa, between the endemic blesbok and harvester termites. The blesbok have been observed to deliberately place dung middens when they are in the vicinity of the harvester termite mounds. It has been suggested that this could be due to the fact that termite mounds are built on ground where the surrounding is cleared. This allows the blesboks greater ability to detect predators if foraging in the area, and termite presence in the vicinity could be an indicator of richer resources available from recycling of nutrients. Since decomposers such as termites increase the quality of the surrounding vegetation for foraging, this suggests that there is a positive evolutionary feedback within this interaction, with both participants in this interaction providing resources for the other.

== Use in paleobiology ==
=== Climate information ===
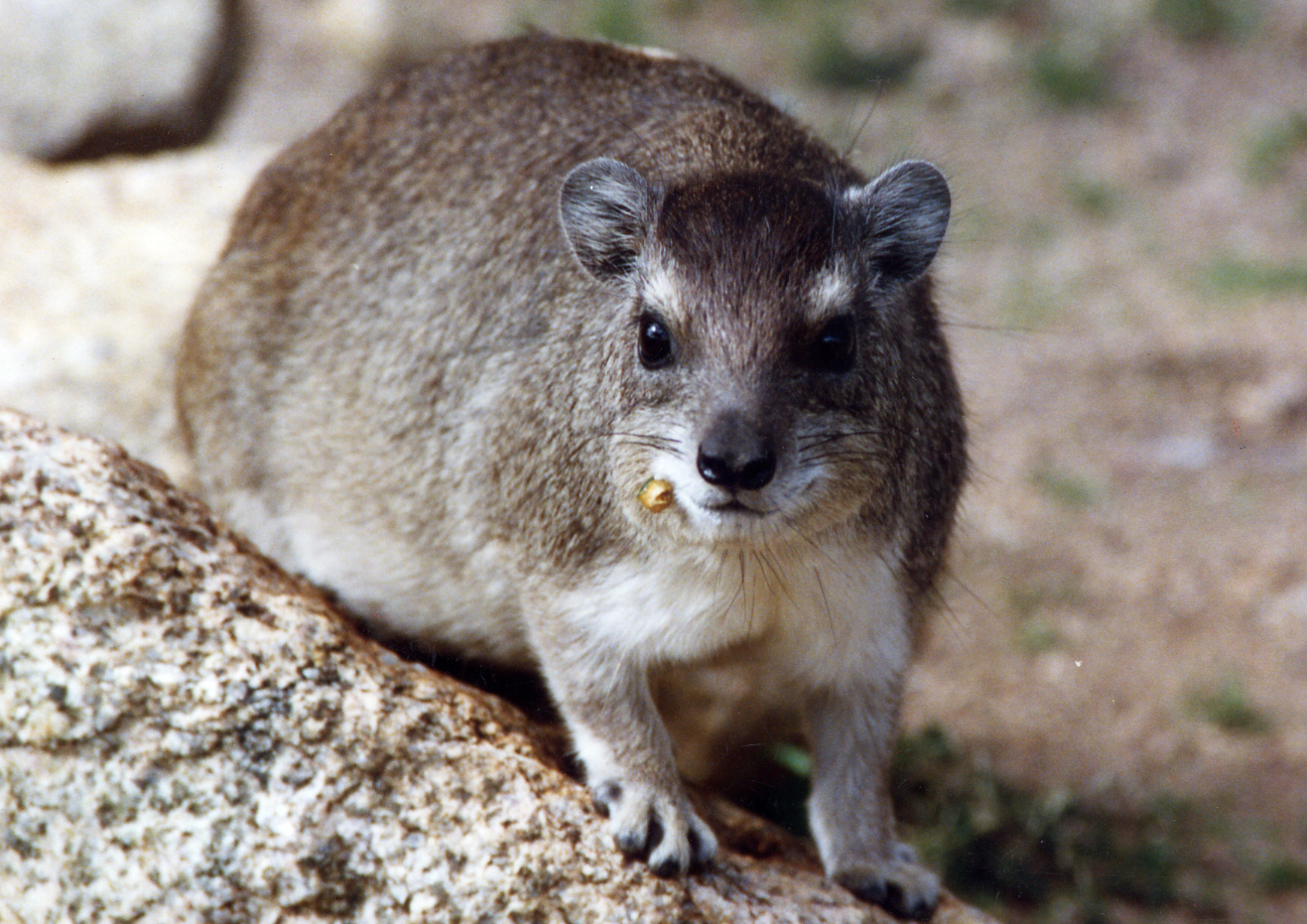
Bush Hyrax from Serengeti National Park, Tanzania. Fossilized dung middens from Hyrax species have contributed significant climate information for paleobiologists.

Pollen that becomes fossilized in dung midden can provide information about the climate and environment during the time period when it was fossilized. This provides researchers with a better understanding of what historical environmental changes may have occurred leading up to the biodiversity and present day environment of various places.

Fossilized hyrax (small herbivorous mammals resembling rodents but more closely associated with elephants and manatees) dung has been found in a rock shelter on the Brandberg Mountain in Namibia, has been found to possess fossilized pollen. Radiocarbon dating places it between 30,000 years ago to modern times, making it the first evidence of pollen from the Late Pleistocene in south-western Africa. The pollen is preserved by layers of dung that are piled upon each other and sealed by urine. The dung found from this time is that of the family Asteraceae, a family not known to be found in Namibia or deserts. This suggests that climate in this area may have been tropical during this time, but it is also hypothesized that the spores were spread either aromatically or aquatically from another location.

In an earlier Brandberg Mountain sample from 17,000 years ago, Stoebe pollen was found in dung. There is also the presence of fern-spores indicating a moist climate during that time. This moisture would most likely be from melting and evaporating glaciers and not heavy rain.

Sources of midden as old as 6,000 years ago can also be used to view the climate through the presence of certain pollen and the attributed rainfall necessary for those plants to be present and flowering. However, the changing presence of some plants can also be due to erratic conditions such as grazing and human interference by Nomadic people. Although, this is not thought to explain all of the aridity and variation of the area at certain times. The presence of certain flowering plants during the mid-Holocene that require more moisture leads to a conclusion of increased summer rainfall. This also accounts for the seasonal variability as many of plants found in the dung do not rely upon winter rain.

==== Example of dung midden use in paleobiology: Namib Desert ====
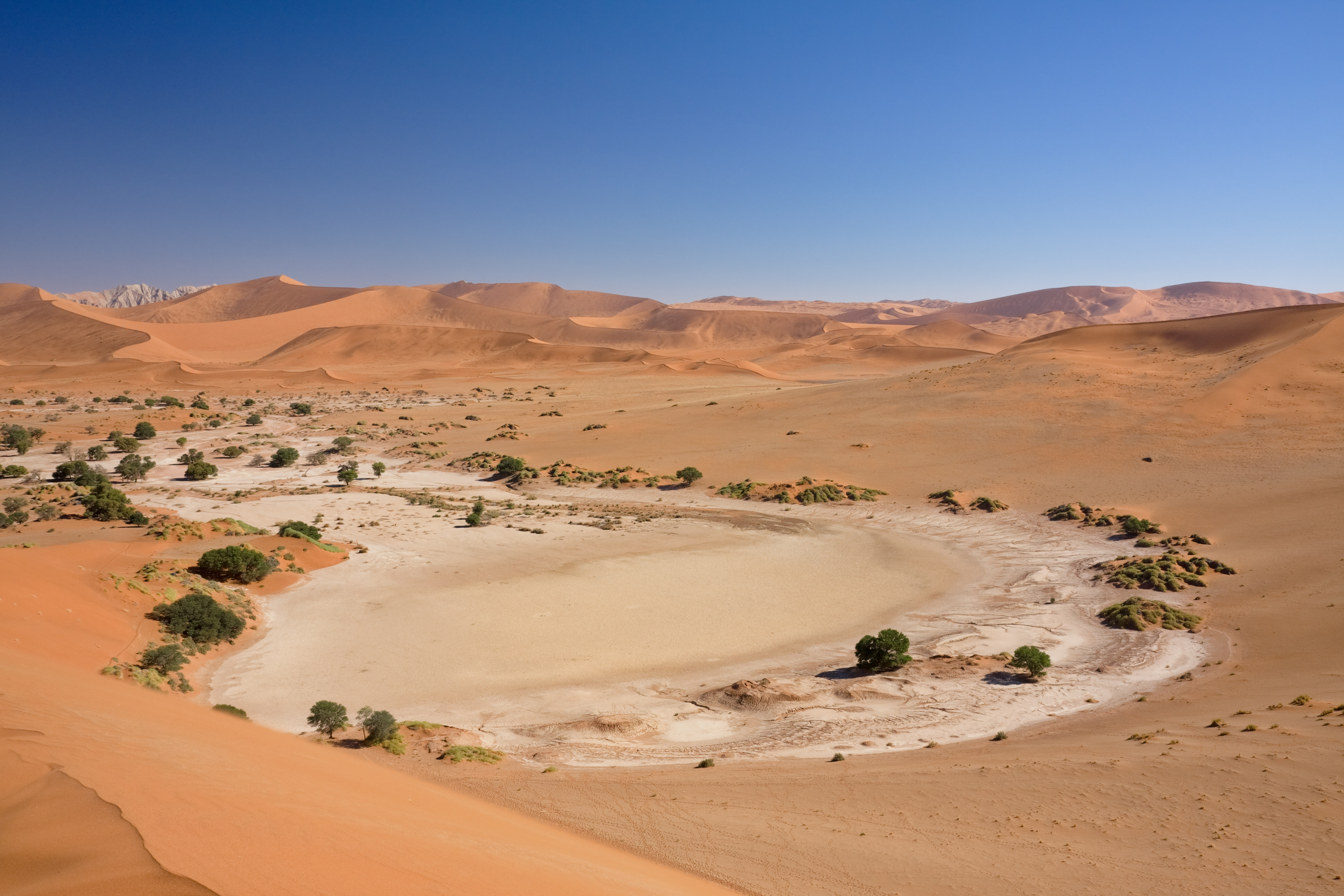
The Namib desert has an arid climate, making dung middens a valuable resource for researchers to study past climates.

Much is unknown about the origins of the unique biodiversity in the Namib desert. It has an arid climate and granitic substrate, which does not favor the preservation of organic material that would typically help provide insight into the history of the biodiversity. Common artifacts typically used to study environmental conditions such as lake or swamp deposits, caves, river systems, or dune-fields do not exist. Thus it has been difficult to understand the history of the Namib desert. Through the use of dung middens found in various parts of the desert, researchers are able to reconstruct the paleoenvironmental conditions. Specifically, fossilized hyrax dung in shallow cave shelters contains fossilized pollen and dust which contains information on the vegetation that was consumed by the hyrax. Pollen data can provide information on the vegetation during different time periods, and using this data the changes in moisture levels in desert areas such as the desert northwest of Namibia can be determined.

While the pollen and dust in the dung provides information on the types of vegetation that previously existed, it is also important to use radiocarbon dating for information on the era that the dung is from. In a town in South Africa, researchers found conflicting data about the time period the dung midden they were studying was from. The initial researchers failed to consider the impact of local radiocarbon concentrations that were higher than usual due to the testing of nuclear arms. Through pollen analysis, radiocarbon dating, and considering the history of radiocarbon levels in the atmosphere, dung middens are able to provide useful information about the historical environment of dry and arid places such as the Namib desert.
