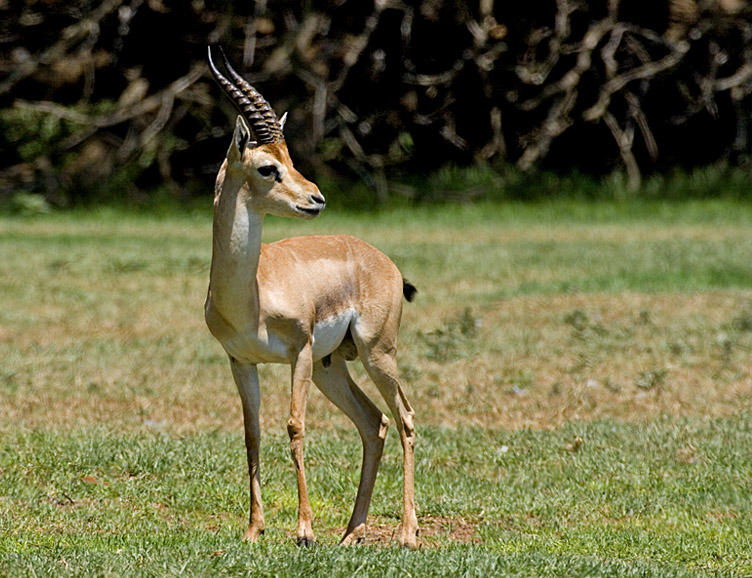
- Mountain gazelle (male)

Conservation status
- Endangered (IUCN 3.1)

Scientific classification
- Kingdom: Animalia
- Phylum: Chordata
- Class: Mammalia
- Order: Artiodactyla
- Family: Bovidae
- Subfamily: Antilopinae
- Genus: Gazella
- Species: G. gazella

Binomial name
- Gazella gazella (Pallas, 1766)
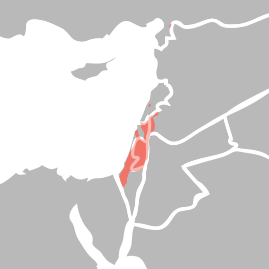
- Gazella gazella distribution

= Mountain gazelle =

Species of mammal

The mountain gazelle (Gazella gazella), also called the true gazelle or the Palestine mountain gazelle, is a species of gazelle that is widely but unevenly distributed.

Approximately 6,000 are left in the wild as of 2024. The mountain gazelle is protected under Israeli law, with Israel being the last major sanctuary of the species in the Levant.

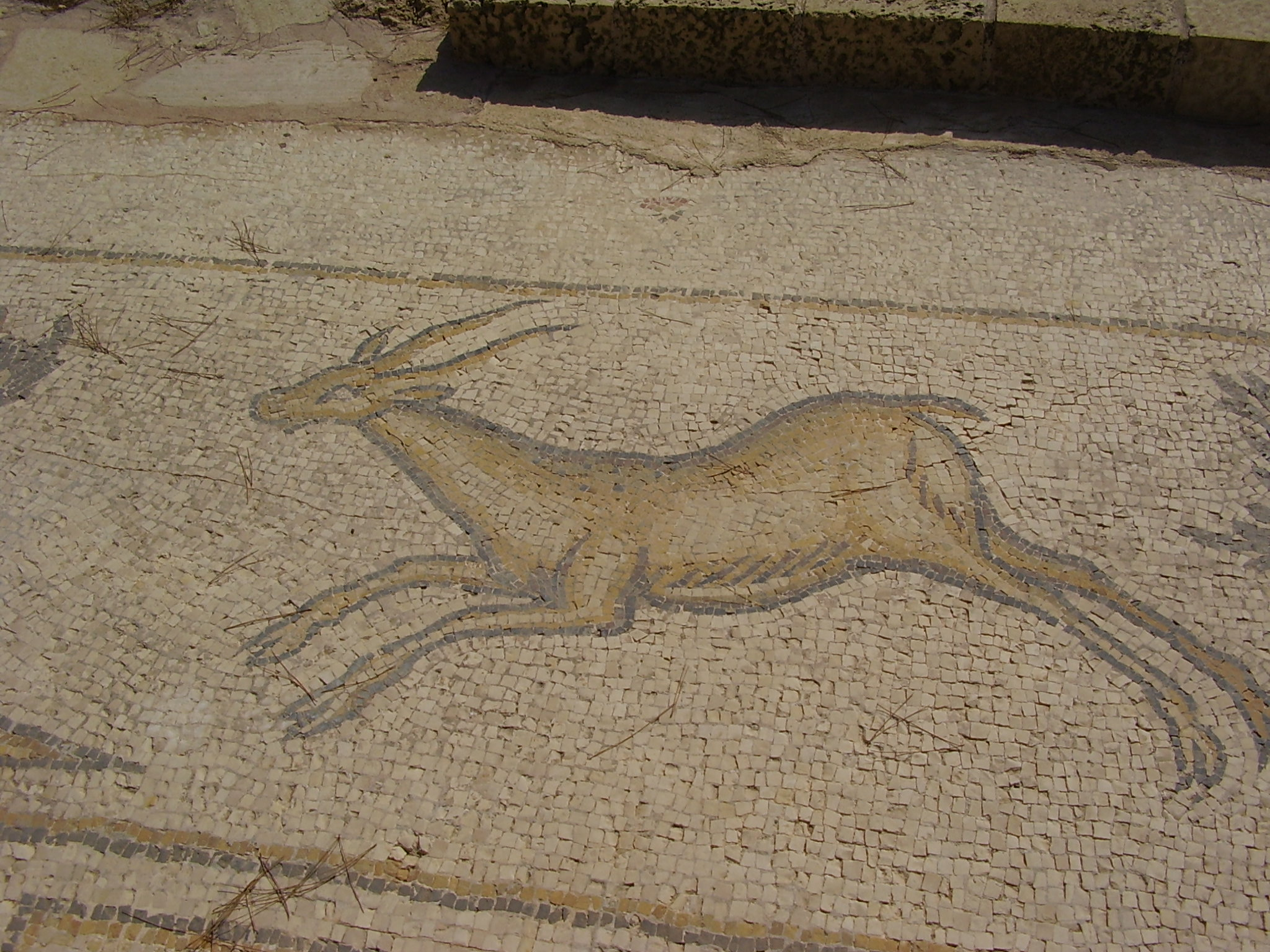
Byzantine-era mosaic of gazelle in Caesarea Maritima

== Description ==
Both sexes of the mountain gazelle have horns. Males have significantly larger horns with rings around them. Females also have horns, but they are thinner, smoother and shorter. Along with the horns, mountain gazelle are also sexually dimorphic in size, with males being larger than females. A mature male can range from 15 to 25 kg, while females are 13–20 kg in weight. Mountain gazelle can reach running speeds of up to 80 km/h (50 mph).

== Population and range ==
Mountain gazelle were historically distributed across the Levant. Currently they are most abundant in Israel, and are also present in the West Bank in Palestine, the Golan Heights, and Turkey. Small, isolated populations are also found in parts of Jordan, the Gaza Strip, and may be present (though unlikely) in Lebanon, Egypt, and Syria outside of the Golan Heights.

The mountain gazelle is protected as an endangered species under Israeli law, with Israel described as "the last stronghold" of the species in the Levant.

The most recent population estimates and locations by country are:

Country	Population	Details
Israel, Palestinian Territories and the Golan Heights	5,000	One population of around 3,000 gazelles inhabits the Naftali, Yavniel, Ramot Yissachar, and Gilboa Mountains; the eastern Galilee; and the Golan Heights. Another population of about 850 lives in the Judean Hills and Jerusalem area. A series of smaller populations live across the Mediterranean region of Israel and the West Bank, as well as near the Dead Sea. They have been occasionally seen in the Gaza Strip.
Jordan	Present; number unknown	A small number of mountain gazelles have been observed near the Yarmouk and Jordan Rivers, though the population has been in decline for decades and the last confirmed sighting was in 2015.
Turkey	1,331	Turkey's mountain gazelle population lives in the Kırıkhan district of the Hatay province on the border with Syria. They have grown in number from 150 in 2009, to over 1,140 by 2020 and 1,331 by 2023.

== Ecology ==
=== Behavior ===
The mountain gazelle is a crepuscular species; they are awake most of the day and sleep most of the night, but generally are always active in the early morning hours and around sunset. They are also very territorial within their herds, and typically stay in groups of three to eight individuals. There are two main herd-types in the mountain gazelle community, namely mother/baby "maternity" herds and bachelor male herds; older, solitary males patrol and stake out territories, as well. Mountain gazelles often communicate vocally, with calls referring to threats, alarms, and courtship. Males mark their territory using dung middens (piles).

=== Survival and reproduction ===
In the wild, mountain gazelle rarely survive past the age of eight, but can live up to 15 years in captivity with adequate care. By 12 months, a female gazelle can begin breeding. For males, 18 months is when they will start breeding. Being polygamous, and not spending their lives with only one partner, the mountain gazelle typical breeding season is during the early winter months. Females will give birth to one offspring per year, mostly around the months of April and May. A few days prior to giving birth, the mother will leave her herd for a time, and live in solitude. Upon its birth, the newborn is especially vulnerable to predation. For up to two months, the mother and her offspring will stay by themselves, the mother keeping her baby well-hidden in vegetation while she forages. The baby will not typically accompany its mother to graze for several weeks, relying solely on camouflage and lying perfectly still to avoid detection by carnivores. Upon her return, the mother watches out diligently for threats. While young males will stay with their mother for only six months before departing to a herd of young males, young females will sometimes join their mother in the females' herd.

=== Habitat ===
Gazelle have adapted to live in dry, arid conditions. A large amount of their moisture needs are obtained through the vegetation they consume, though they cannot go very long without water. They spend most of their time at the flat tops and crests of mountains, hills, and valleys. Adapting to an annual average temperature of 21–23 °C, gazelles prefer to bed on breezy, elevated areas to avoid the heat of the day. Around dawn and dusk, these antelope will be found cautiously traversing the hills to eat in light forests, fields, or rocky plateaus. Given their preference for elevation, it seems they are less adapted to hot, dry conditions than other ungulates, like the Dorcas gazelle; this diminutive antelope appears to have outcompeted the mountain gazelle throughout some of its range in the late Holocene era, during a period of climatic warming.

=== Food ===
Grasses and shrubs are the gazelle's most frequent source of food, with grazing being their preferred method of foraging. They are known to browse on low-hanging branches and young shoots as well, especially when their range encompasses that of the acacia tree. They can survive for long periods of time without a water source. Instead, they acquire water from succulent plants and dew droplets.

=== Ecological Relationships ===
Their predators include golden eagles, feral dogs, foxes, golden jackals, Arabian wolves and, in some areas, Arabian and Anatolian leopards. Fecal analyses of mountain gazelles in Turkey have found 12 gastrointestinal helminth (parasitic worm) species and a coccidian protozoan. The parasitic worm species included lungworms and nematodes.

== History ==
The mountain gazelle underwent a series of size changes during the late Pleistocene, being smallest during the early and middle Epipalaeolithic Near East, and reaching their largest size in the early Epipalaeolithic. They then slightly shrank before stabilizing in size in the middle Pre-Pottery Neolithic. In the early and late Natufian culture era, human impact, such as hunting and living in more permanent settlements, may have driven gazelle numbers down enough that it provided more food to each animal, thus increasing average body size. Later, the greater stability of food and water from agriculture and the avoidance of humans and livestock by gazelles may have similarly reduced population size and intraspecific competition for the gazelles and allowed individual animals to grow larger on average.

In the early 20th Century, unregulated hunting with firearms decimated the mountain gazelle population. By 1948, the population of Israel and the Palestinian Territories was approximately 500 individuals. With protection from Israel's 1955 Wildlife Law, the spread of agriculture, and the initial removal of predators, the population grew to approximately 10,000 individuals by the 1980s. In the mid-1980s, an outbreak of foot-and-mouth disease in the southern Golan Heights and Ramat Yissachar killed about 3,500 gazelles. Combined with the return of predators, poaching, vehicle accidents, and other causes, the population declined to approximately 3,000 by 2001. To prevent future outbreaks, a plan was drawn up to stabilize the female population at 1,000 in the Golan and 700 in Ramat Yissachar. As of 2020, Israel's Nature and Parks Authority and other researchers have recorded a slow recovery, with approximately 5,000 gazelles across the country.

In April 2024, a mountain gazelle with six legs (polymelia disorder) was sighted along the Wadi Gaza at the Besor Stream.

== Threats and conservation ==
Mountain gazelles are hunted for food in some parts of their range, although hunting mountain gazelles became illegal in Israel in 1955. A 2019 estimate found there are likely 300–1300 gazelles poached annually.

As the mountain gazelle's habitat has become a more urban area of the world, there are numerous threats that to the population. Habitat destruction, habitat fragmentation, and collisions with cars are all anthropogenic threats to the gazelles. In areas with high human disturbance, gazelles tend to face predation from feral dogs and jackals, causing the population recruitment rate to be low. Golden jackals are a historic predator of the gazelles, and a study of golden jackal diets in Park Britannia, central Israel found ungulates made up 70% of the jackal's diet, of which 14% of the ungulate biomass was gazelle. Gazelles may also be more susceptible to predation from golden jackals and wild boar in areas where cattle grazing is used to reduce fire risk.

Ongoing conservation efforts include protecting existing populations and reestablishing gazelle populations. In 2008, the Supreme Court of Israel overturned the approval of a housing development in critical habitat where Gazella gazella gazella were listed as a petitioner on the supreme court case. Additional research on the mountain gazelle and its close relatives the dorcas gazelle and Arabian gazelle are allowing for forensic identification of the gazelles to aide wildlife forensic scientists and law enforcement to enforce wildlife protection laws. Twelve mountain gazelles were released in Gazelle Valley, Jerusalem, where the population has rebounded from three to about 80 individuals in a 25 hectare fenced off portion of the park where they are protected from predators and car collisions.

The West Bank barrier, which was built by Israel between 2000 and 2005, poses a great ecological conundrum as it separates populations of many indigenous species on both sides. The mountain gazelle is one of these.

== Subspecies ==
Historically, some others such as the Cuvier's gazelle (G. cuvieri) were included as a subspecies, but recent authorities consistently treat them as separate species.
