= Dicranocara =

Scientific classification
- Kingdom: Animalia
- Phylum: Arthropoda
- Class: Insecta
- Order: Coleoptera
- Suborder: Polyphaga
- Infraorder: Scarabaeiformia
- Family: Scarabaeidae
- Genus: Dicranocara; Frolov and Scholtz, 2003

Species
- See text

Genus of beetles

Dicranocara is a genus of Scarabaeidae or scarab beetles in the superfamily Scarabaeoidea. Dicranocara is endemic to the Richtersveld National Park. Three species are known, D. deschodti Frolov and Scholtz, D. tatasensis Deschodt and Scholtz and D. inexpectata Deschodt and Scholtz. Only D. tatasensis occurs south of the Orange River.

The species in the genus live in close association with rock hyraxes (Procavia capensis). These hyraxes have communal toilets or dung middens. These middens are a stable and dependable food source for Dicranocara in a resource scarce environment.
