= Animal welfare and rights in Israel =

Treatment of and laws concerning non-human animals in Israel

Animal welfare and rights in Israel is about the treatment of and laws concerning nonhuman animals in Israel. Israel's major animal welfare law is the Animal Protection Law, passed in 1994, which has been amended several times since. Several other laws also related to the treatment of animals: Rabies Ordinance, 1934; Fishing Ordinance, 1937; Public Health Ordinance, 1940; Wildlife Protection Law, 1955; Plants Protection Law, 1956; Criminal Procedure Law, 1982; Animal Disease Ordinance, 1985; National Parks, Nature Reserves (and zoos), National Sites and Memorial Sites Law, 1991; the Law of Veterinarians, 1991; Dog Regulation Law, 2002; Rabies Regulations (Vaccinations), 2005; and Prohibition on declawing cats unless for reasons vital to the cat's health or owner's health, 2011.

Israeli interest in animal rights and veganism have grown significantly in recent years.

== Regulations ==
=== Animal Protection Law ===
The 1994 Animal Protection Law is Israel's main piece of animal welfare legislation. The law prohibits working an unfit animal or working an animal to exhaustion, as well as poisoning an animal with certain poisons (unless granted a permit by the Director of the Veterinary Service), with a penalty of imprisonment for one year. A 2000 amendment prohibits torture and cruel treatment; inciting one animal against another; organizing a contest between animal; or cutting into the live tissue of an animal for cosmetic purposes. The penalty for offenses in this category is three year imprisonment.

Israel's Minister of Agriculture is responsible for implementation of the law and the Minister of the Environment appoints trustees to file complaints against offenders. The law establishes an Animal Welfare Fund to promote education, information, and aid to animal welfare groups. Around 3.5 million NIS (US$782,000 or €616,500) were allocated for animal welfare between 2005 and 2006.

Projects include:

- Education
- Animal Welfare Trustees
- Reduction of stray animals
- Promotion of animal adoption
- Assistance to the Israel Police
- Response to public requests for assistance to animals in distress
- Special projects
- Aid to animal welfare organizations
- Participation in Knesset discussions and protecting animals

In 2015, the Knesset unanimously passed amendments to the animal welfare law, whose provisions include the creation of a positive duty of care in owners and guardians of animals to prevent abuse and provide for basic needs.

==== Implementation ====
According to the organization Concern for Helping Animals in Israel, few cases of institutionalized cruelty (e.g. cruelty on farms, laboratories, fur operations) have been brought to court.

In 1997, the Supreme Court banned crocodile-human fights. However the Court's ruling interpreted the Animal Protection Law as stating that human interests (e.g. in animal food) outweigh animal interests.

In 2002, Israel's Channel 2 exposed the de-horning of cattle without anesthetics at Kibbutz Gat. The Kibbutz and police signed a plea bargain in which the perpetrators were fined only 4000 shekels (less than 900 USD).

=== Animal Experimentation Law ===
The Animal Experimentation law regulates animal experiments in Israel and creates a 23-member National Council for Animal Experimentation that may ban animal use if a "reasonable alternative" is available. For 2017, the Ministry of Health's Council for Animals published a report showing that 1,238,178 vertebrate animals were used in research. The most common species used were fish (72%), mice (22%), rats (3%) and birds (2%).

The National Council for Animal Experimentation mandates that the smallest number of animal experiments be performed while mitigating animal suffering. Researchers are also required to take courses in animal care, and surprise visits to research labs are conducted to enforce compliance.

=== Other laws ===
==== Wildlife Protection Law, 1955 ====
The law was introduced to meet the standards of Convention on International Trade in Endangered Species, and prohibits hunting wild animals with traps, snares, nets, and poisons.

==== Dog Regulation Law, 2002 ====
The law requires licenses for all dogs three months of age or older, mandates microchip implants for dogs, and routine vaccination against rabies. The law also covers importing and keeping of dangerous dogs.

=== Other Policies ===
In 1994, a new law enforcement policy was enacted to help reduce animal cruelty with police stations instructed to investigate reports. An education program in the schools was also initiated, with a proposed one hour-a week class discussion.

==== Bans ====
Israel has banned the following: dissections of animals in elementary and secondary schools (optional participation in dissection at university level is allowed); performances by trained animals in circuses; and the production of foie gras. Of the three, the last is significant because Israel was previously the world's fourth biggest producer of foie gras, but it gave up this major source of income for ethical reasons.

Although Israel has never had a whaling industry, it has joined the International Whaling Commission in order to vote against any resumption of commercial whaling.

== Animals used for food ==
=== Animal agriculture ===
According to a 2014 Ministry of Agriculture report, Israel has one of the highest per capita dairy production in the world, and its milk yield per cow is the highest in the world.

Israeli beef production rose from 13,000 metric tons in 1960 to 85,000 in 2015. Chicken meat rose from 40,000 metric tons in 1964 to 125,000 in 2000.

There are approximately 8 million egg-laying hens on Israeli farms at any time. The Israeli government sets a quota for egg production, which was raised from 1.928 billion in 2014 to 2.05 billion in 2015.

In Israel, it is legal to confine hens in battery cages, pigs in gestation crates, and to cut off farm animals' body parts without anesthesia.

=== Veganism ===
The popularity of veganism has risen significantly in recent years. In a 2018 study, 5% of Israeli respondents identified as vegan and 8% as vegetarian, up from 2.6% identifying as vegetarians in 2010. The Israeli army now provides vegan food, leather-free boots and wool-free berets due to the increase in the number of vegan troops.

=== Cultured meat ===
The Modern Agriculture Foundation (MAF) was founded in Israel in 2015 with the goal of mass-producing cultured meat, or meat grown in a medium outside of a living animal. The MAF is the only existing cultured animal product project to focus on the meat of chickens, which make up the large majority of land animals killed for food each year (roughly 50 billion).

== Animals used for clothing ==
In 2009, a bill was introduced to the Knesset to ban all farming and import of fur. If passed, it would have been the first law of its kind in the world. The bill repeatedly, failed however, despite having majority support in preliminary stages. Some have implicated the influence of the fur industry in the failure of the bill, as some members of the Knesset were given paid trips to Europe by the fur industry.

In 2020, the Knesset outlawed the use of "skin and fur" in the country's fashion industries, deeming it "immoral". The law also imposes fines up to $22,000 for anyone caught selling or buying fur after the ban takes effect. However, ultra-Orthodox Jews are exempt from the law, as they often wear shtreimels.

In June 2021, Israel became the first country in the world to ban the sale of fur.

== Animal activism ==
Though animal activism has been present in Israel since at least the 1980s, with vegetarian campaigns through the 1990s and 2000s, it has grown rapidly only in recent years. On October 23, 2015, roughly 10,000 people participated in an animal rights protest in Tel Aviv - the largest protest in Israel to date. Activists in these protests oppose factory farming and animal testing, chanting "Justice, compassion, veganism" and "Meat is murder". These protests have been taking place in Israel since 2012.

The spike in Israeli interest in veganism and animal rights has been partly attributed to a video of a speech on those subjects by activist Gary Yourofsky, which was given Hebrew subtitles by activists in 2010. The video went viral, becoming one of the most-watched videos in Israeli history.

=== Animals Now ===
"Animals Now"', previously known as "Anonymous for Animal Rights", is one of Israel's largest animal activist groups. Their activities include undercover investigations of animal farming operations, vegan outreach, and lobbying for policy reform. In 2015, they carried out seven undercover investigations. Several of these were featured on Israel's Channel 2 or Channel 10 News, several received international exposure, and one led to the temporary closure of an Israeli slaughterhouse. They also implemented the second year of their Challenge22+ initiative, a free program to help people transition to veganism. 12,000 participants took part, making a total of 22,000 from March 2014 to the end of 2015. The organization has launched a pilot for an international version of the project.

=== 269life ===
269 is the number given to a calf born on an Israeli dairy farm who was rescued by animal rights activists. In protests on October 2, 2012 - World Farm Animals Day - activists began tattooing or branding themselves with the number 269 in a show of solidarity with animals on factory farms. This was the beginning of the 269life Movement, which spread to a number of other countries.

In March 2013, activists placed cows' and sheep's heads on fountains in Tel Aviv and Jaffa, and dyed the fountains red to symbolize the blood of slaughtered farm animals. The action provoked the formation of a special investigation team, usually reserved for serious crimes like murder.

=== Concern for Helping Animals in Israel ===
Hakol Chai ("Everything Lives") is an Israeli animal welfare organization. It is the sister organization to Concern for Helping Animals in Israel (CHAI) in the U.S. CHAI was founded in 1984 by American animal activist Nina Natelson.

CHAI helped draft the 1994 Animal Protection Law. It has also campaigned for rabies vaccination as a humane alternative to killing stray animals at risk of rabies and advance a number of other welfare reforms. The organization currently focuses on human education, cultivating compassion in young people in order to reduce violence against animals and people.

== See also ==
=== General ===
- Timeline of animal welfare and rights
- Animal protectionism
- Animal rights movement
- Abolitionism (animal rights)

=== In Judaism ===
- Tza'ar ba'alei chayim - animal welfare laws in Judaism
- Jewish vegetarianism
