= Njau Forest Park =

- Location: Gambia
- Area: 364 ha (900 acres)

Njau Forest Park is a forest park in the Gambia. It covers 364 hectares.
