= Katilenge Forest Park =

Forest Park in Gambia

- IUCN category IV (habitat/species management area)
- Interactive map of Katilenge Forest Park
- Location: Gambia
- Coordinates: 13°10′37″N 16°26′9″W
- Area: 324 ha (800 acres)

Katilenge Forest Park is a forest park in the Gambia. It covers 324 hectares. The border with Senegal forms the southern border of the forest area.

It is located at 30 meters above sea level.
