= Kasaywa Forest Park =

Forest park in the Gambia

Coordinates: 13.5083°N 16.235°W

- IUCN category IV (habitat/species management area)
- Interactive map of Kasaywa Forest Park
- Location: Gambia
- Area: 202 ha (500 acres)

Kasaywa Forest Park is a forest park in the Gambia. It covers 202 hectares.
