= Ngeyen Forest Park =

Forest in Gambia

- IUCN category IV (habitat/species management area)
- Location: Gambia
- Area: 527.1 ha (1,302 acres)

Ngeyen Forest Park is a forest park in the Gambia. It covers 527.1 hectares.
