= Njama Forest Park =

- Location: Gambia
- Area: 22 ha (54 acres)

Njama Forest Park is a forest park in the Gambia. It covers 22 hectares.
