= Pilabi Forest Park =

- IUCN category IV (habitat/species management area)
- Location: Gambia
- Area: 217 ha (540 acres)

Pilabi Forest Park is a forest park in the Gambia. It covers 217 hectares.
