= Jabisa Forest Park =

Gambian protected area

- IUCN category IV (habitat/species management area)
- Location: Gambia
- Area: 16 ha (40 acres)

Jabisa Forest Park is a forest park in the Gambia. It covers 16 hectares.

It is located in Lower River, the estimate terrain elevation above sea level is 11 metres.
