= Sutukung Bani Forest Park =

- IUCN category IV (habitat/species management area)
- Location: Gambia
- Area: 6 ha (15 acres)

Sutukung Bani Forest Park is a Forest Park in the Gambia. It covers six hectares.

It is located in the Lower River area at an altitude of 45 meters.
