= Jamara Forest Park =

- IUCN category IV (habitat/species management area)
- Location: Gambia
- Area: 579 ha (1,430 acres)

Jamara Forest Park is a forest park in the Gambia. It covers 579 hectares.

It is located in Central River, the estimate terrain elevation above sea level is 19 metres.
