= Se-Ulumbang Forest Park =

- IUCN category IV (habitat/species management area)
- Location: Gambia
- Area: 529 hectares (1,310 acres)

Se-Ulumbang Forest Park is a forest park in the Gambia. It covers 529 hectares.
