= Jollifin Forest Park =

Forest park in the Gambia

- IUCN category IV (habitat/species management area)
- Location: Gambia
- Area: 439 ha (1,080 acres)

Jollifin Forest Park is a forest park in the Gambia. It covers 439 hectares.
