= Mamato Konko Forest Park =

- IUCN category IV (habitat/species management area)
- Location: Gambia
- Area: 431 ha (1,070 acres)

Mamato Konko Forest Park is a forest park in the Gambia. It covers 431 hectares.
