= Kiberi Forest Park =

Forest park in Gambia

- IUCN category IV (habitat/species management area)
- Interactive map of Kiberi Forest Park
- Location: Gambia
- Coordinates: 13°37′15″N 14°40′37″W
- Area: 389 hectares (960 acres)

Kiberi Forest Park is a forest park in the Gambia. It covers 389 hectares.

Park has an elevation of 36 metres.
