= Lofa =

Lofa may refer to:

- Lofa County, a county in Liberia
- Lofa Defense Force or LDF, a rebel group that participated in the Liberian Civil War
- Lofa River, a river in Liberia
- Lofa Tatupu (Mosiula Mea'alofa "Lofa" Tatupu, born 1982), American football linebacker
- Lofa-Mano National Park, a proposed national park in Liberia
- League of Oran Football Association (LOFA): former departemental football governing body under the french colonial period of Algeria
- Leap of Faith Assumption, a concept of the Lean startup business development process

== See also ==
- Lofanga, an island in Tonga
