= Jambangkunda Forest Park =

- IUCN category IV (habitat/species management area)
- Location: Gambia
- Area: 356 hectares (880 acres)

Jambangkunda Forest Park is a forest park in the Gambia. It covers 356 hectares. It was founded in 1954.
