= Ngongonding Forest Park =

- IUCN category IV (habitat/species management area)
- Location: Gambia
- Area: 1,410 ha (3,500 acres)

Ngongonding Forest Park is a forest park in the Gambia. It covers 1,410 hectares.
