= Sao Frest Forest Park =

- IUCN category IV (habitat/species management area)
- Location: Gambia
- Area: 728 ha (1,800 acres)

Sao Frest Forest Park is a forest park in the Gambia. It covers 728 hectares.
