= Sakaru Dalla Forest Park =

Forest park in The Gambia

- IUCN category IV (habitat/species management area)
- Location: Gambia
- Area: 261 ha (640 acres)

Sakaru Dalla Forest Park is a forest park in the Gambia. It covers 261 hectares.
