= Sambo Tumang Forest Park =

Forest park

- IUCN category IV (habitat/species management area)
- Location: Gambia
- Area: 45 ha (110 acres)

Sambo Tumang Forest Park is a forest park in the Gambia. It covers 45 hectares.

It is located in the Central River region at an altitude of nine meters.
