= Kumadi Forest Park =

- IUCN category IV (habitat/species management area)
- Interactive map of Kumadi Forest Park
- Location: Gambia
- Coordinates: 13°30′12″N 16°12′20″W
- Area: 283 ha (700 acres)

Kumadi Forest Park is a forest park in the Gambia. It covers 283 hectares.

The area is located in the North Bank region in the Jokadu district and was set up like the other forest parks in Gambia on January 1, 1954.

The estimated terrain elevation above sea level is 20 metres.
