= Hamdulai Forest Park =

Forest park in the Gambia

- IUCN category IV (habitat/species management area)
- Location: Gambia
- Area: 112 ha (280 acres)

Hamdulai Forest Park is a forest park in the Gambia. It covers 112 hectares.
