= Kenowore Forest Park =

Gambian Forest Park

- IUCN category IV (habitat/species management area)
- Interactive map of Kenowore Forest Park
- Location: Gambia
- Coordinates: 13°25′52″N 15°39′58″W
- Area: 67 hectares (170 acres)

Kenowore Forest Park is a forest park in the Gambia. It covers 67 hectares.

It is located in the Lower River Region in the Kiang East District and was set up like the other Forest Parks in Gambia on January 1, 1954.

Park has an elevation of 14 metres.
