= Jeloki Forest Park =

Protected area in the Gambia

- IUCN category IV (habitat/species management area)
- Location: Gambia
- Area: 858 ha (2,120 acres)

Jeloki Forest Park is a forest park in the Gambia. It covers 858 hectares.

The park was founded in 1953.
