= Tabaning Sita Forest Park =

Forest park in the Gambia

- IUCN category IV (habitat/species management area)
- Location: Gambia
- Area: 16 ha (40 acres)

Tabaning Sita Forest Park is a Forest Park in the Gambia. It covers 16 hectares.
