= Yoboki National Park =

National Park in Djibouti

Coordinates: 11.5103°N 42.1047°E

- IUCN category II (national park)
- Interactive map of Yoboki National Park
- Location: Djibouti
- Nearest city: Ali Sabieh

Yoboki National Park is a national park in Djibouti surrounding the town of Yoboki.

The city of Yoboki was originally created as a French military post office in 1947.

== Ecosystems ==
The park has a diverse ecosystem with two main geographical areas, in the east parts there are hills and mountainous terrain, and plains, valleys and desert scenes are in the west.
