= Aouk National Park =

National park in Chad

- IUCN category II (national park)
- Location within Chad
- Location: Chad
- Coordinates: 9°49′59″N 20°10′0″E
- Area: 7,400 km^{2} (2,900 mi^{2})

Aouk National Park is a national park in Chad. It covers an area of 7400 km^{2}.

Although the park did not thrive with the same protection as Zakouma National Park, it is still home to a huge and impressive mix of mammals and birds. It is a popular place for safari excursions.
