= Goz Beïda National Park =

National park in Chad

- IUCN category II (national park)
- Location within Chad
- Location: Chad
- Coordinates: 12°10′0″N 21°19′59″E
- Area: 3,000 km^{2} (1,200 mi^{2})

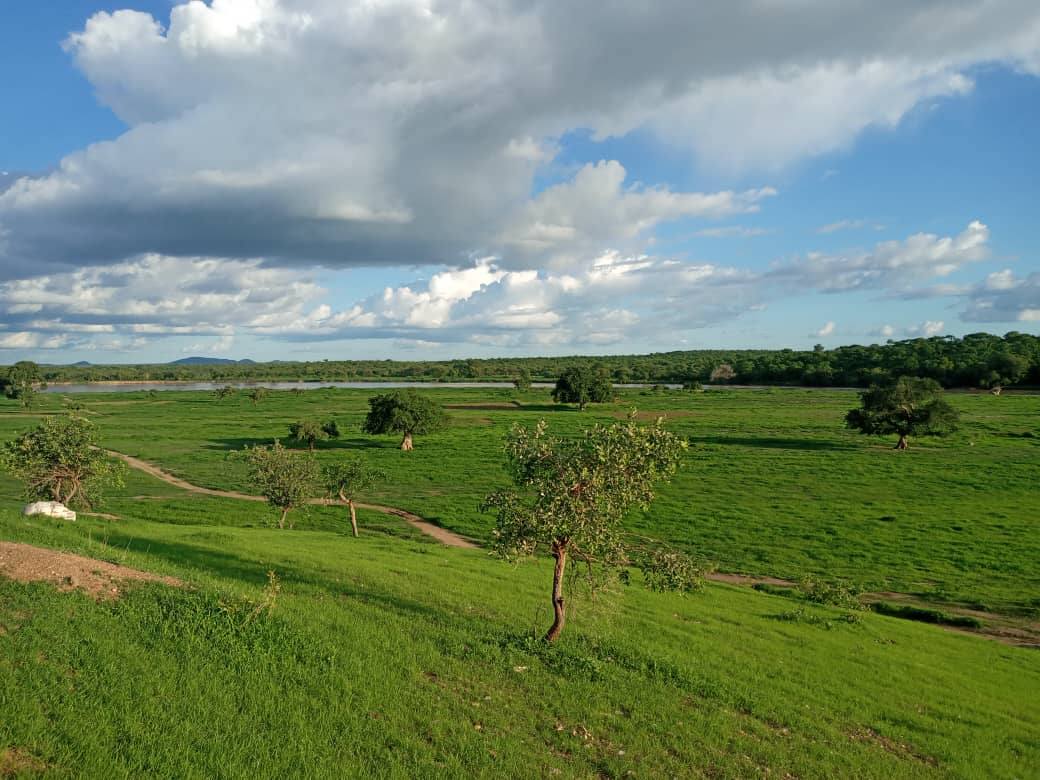
Goz-Beïda National Park

Goz Beïda National Park is a national park in Chad and covers an area of 3000 km^{2}.

It is located near the town of the same name in the province of Sila. The area has been hit by internal conflicts in the country, but it has also remained a haven for many endangered plant and animal species.
