= Rajma National Park =

National park in Libya

Rajma National Park is a national park in Libya. It is a wetlands and protected area within the Jabal al Gharbi District of Libya, south of Tripoli and Murqub. This district is landlocked, meaning Rajma does not have the coastal diversity found in some areas of the country. This area, like Abughlian, is known for its mountains and harsh desert areas. Lizards, snakes, and rodents are commonplace within Rajma. Desert mammals including hyenas and wildcats also reside in this area. Rajma is also known for the abundance of date palms as well as fig and olive trees.
