= List of national parks of Republic of the Congo =

This is a list of protected areas of the Republic of the Congo.

Park	Area in km^{2}	Date established	Island	Notes
Conkouati-Douli National Park	5,049	1993		
Nouabalé-Ndoki National Park	3,921	1993		
Ntokou-Pikounda National Park	4,572	2012		
Odzala-Kokoua National Park	13,500	1993		Terrestrial
Lekiti National Park	3,500	2018		Terrestrial
