= National parks of Togo =

This is a list of protected areas of the Togo.

== List ==
Park	Area in km^{2}	Date established	Island	Notes
Fazao-Malfakassa National Park	1,920	1975		Terrestrial
Fosse aux Lions National Park	16.50	1954		Terrestrial
Kéran National Park	690	1950		Terrestrial
