= Wongo National Park =

National park in Mali

- Parc national de Wongo
- IUCN category II (national park)
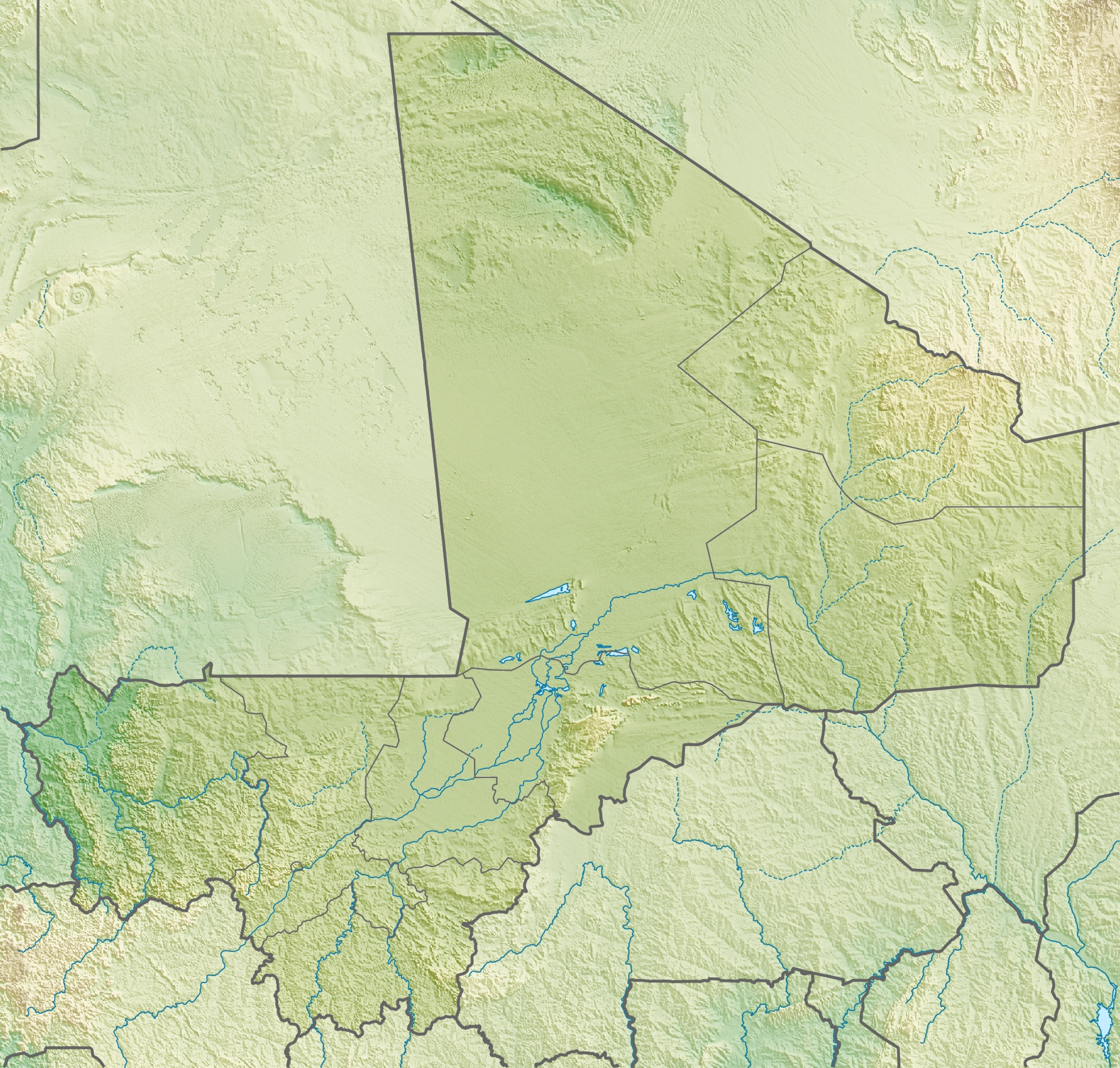
- Location within Mali
- Location: Mali
- Nearest city: Samou
- Coordinates: 12.897°N 10.76°W
- Area: 534 km^{2} (206 sq mi)
- Established: 2002

The Wongo National Park (French: Parc national de Wongo) is found in Mali. It was established on 16 January 2002, and covers 534 km^{2} (206 sq mi).

The park is located in the south of the country and is primarily dedicated to the conservation of chimpanzees. The climate is temperate, the rainy season lasts from June to October.
