= Kalakpa Game Production Reserve =

Protected area in Ghana

- IUCN category VI (protected area with sustainable use of natural resources)
- Location within Ghana
- Location: Ghana
- Coordinates: 6°28′49″N 0°28′36″E
- Area: 320 km^{2} (120 sq mi)
- Created: 1975

Kalakpa Game Production Reserve is a 32,020 ha forest reserve in Ghana.

== History ==
The protected area was founded in 1975 by the Ghanaian government, located on the foothills of the Togo Mountains in the Ho Municipal Area. Before this area became an animal reserve, it served mainly as a preferred hunting area for expatriates in Ghana.

== Geography ==
The reserve is located in the south-eastern part of the country, about 120 km north-east of the capital Accra and about 30 km south of the Volta Regional capital, Ho.

== Environment ==
The reserve lies within the forest/savanna ecotone and contains several rocky hills. The vegetation is dominated by dry Borassus–Combretum woodland crossed by galleries of dry semi-deciduous rainforest. It has been designated an Important Bird Area (IBA) by BirdLife International because it supports significant populations of many bird species.

== Threats ==
- In 2009, there were reports of encroachments on the Kalakpa Resource Reserve.
- Also in 2016 there were reports of illegal logging at the Kalakpa Resource Reserve in the Volta Region, with the risks of the Reserve losing most of its trees.
- In 2018 the Regional Minister said force would have to be considered to relocate the encroachers. About 28 communities with a population of about 2,000, from the four districts hosting the reserve; Adaklu, Ho West, North, and Central Tongu, who were inhabiting the Reserve illegally.
