= Mbaéré Bodingué National Park =

National park in the Central African Republic

Mbaéré-Bodingué National Park
- IUCN category V (protected landscape/seascape)
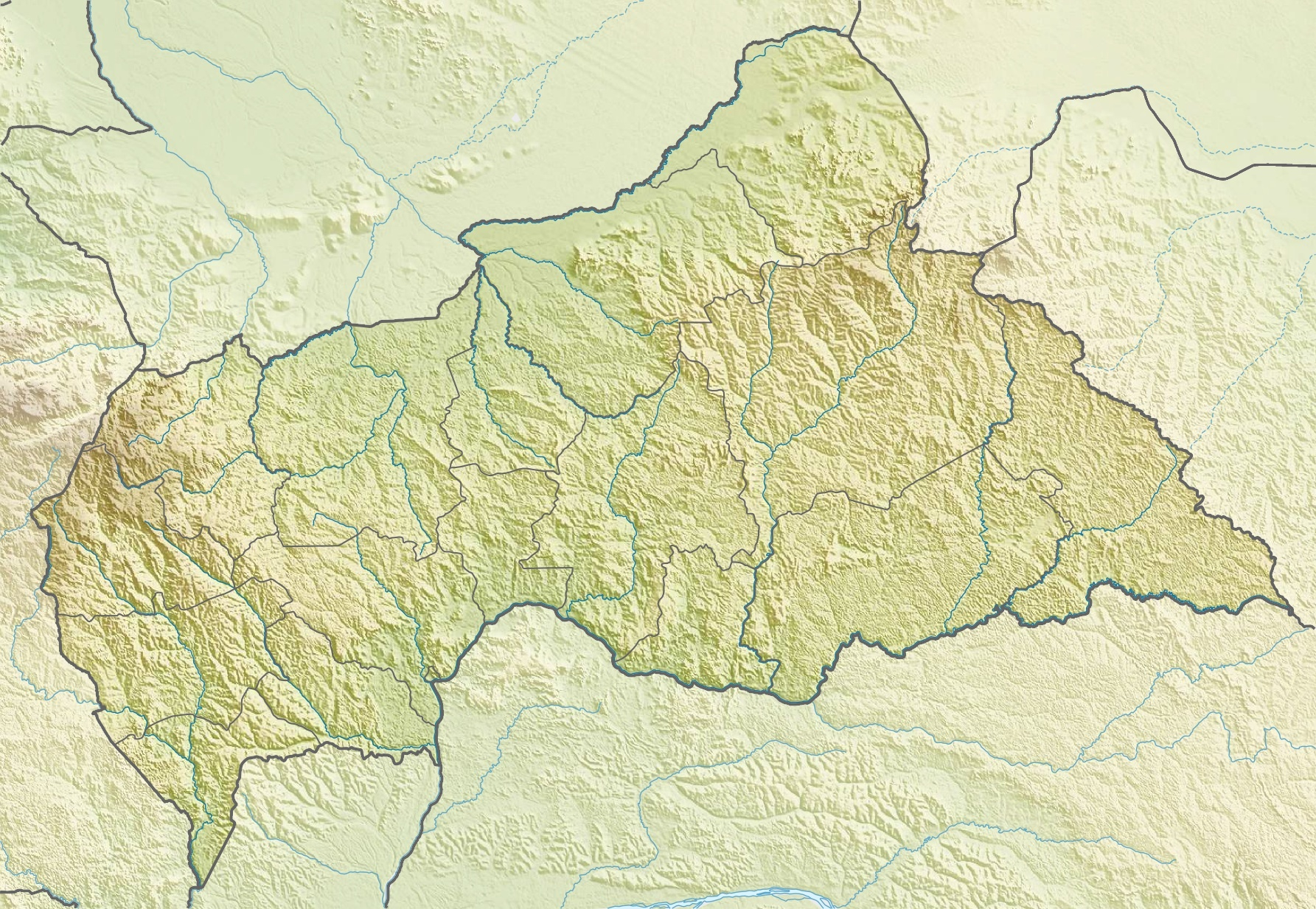
- Location within Central African Republic
- Location: Central African Republic
- Coordinates: 3.8333°N 17.1667°E
- Area: 866 km^{2} (334 sq mi)
- Established: 2007

The Mbaéré-Bodingué National Park is a National Park located in the south west of the Central African Republic. It covers 866 km^{2}. The Park is located between the Mbaéré and Bodingué rivers.

== History ==
The Park was established in 2007 by the Ministry of Water, Forests, Hunting and Fishing and the discontinued Forest Ecosystems in Central Africa (ECOFAC).

== Flora and fauna ==
The Park includes savannah, lowland floodplain forest and rainforest. The area is a biotope for elephants, gorillas, buffalos, chimpanzees, hippos and more than 400 different species of birds.

== Population ==
Beside the animals there are also different ethnic groups of humans that are located in the area and are losing their livelihood as they do hunting and fishing.
