= Sidi Toui National Park =

National park in Tunisia

- Location within Tunisia
- Location: Tunisia
- Coordinates: 32.7136°N 11.2354°E
- Established: 1993

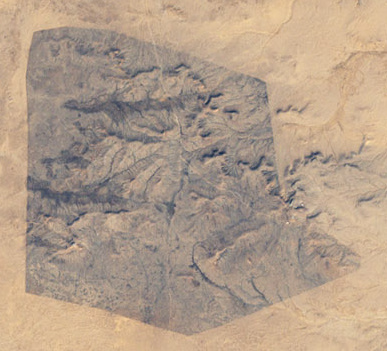
Landsat 7 image from 1999 showing the restored grassland within the park boundary.

Sidi Toui National Park is a Tunisian national park consisting of grassland.

Established in 1993, it is located in the southern part of Tunisia, near the Libyan border. South of the park at 54 kilometers is the town of Ben Gardane. Scimitar oryx have been introduced into the park.
