= Mwagna National Park =

National park in Gabon

- IUCN category II (national park)
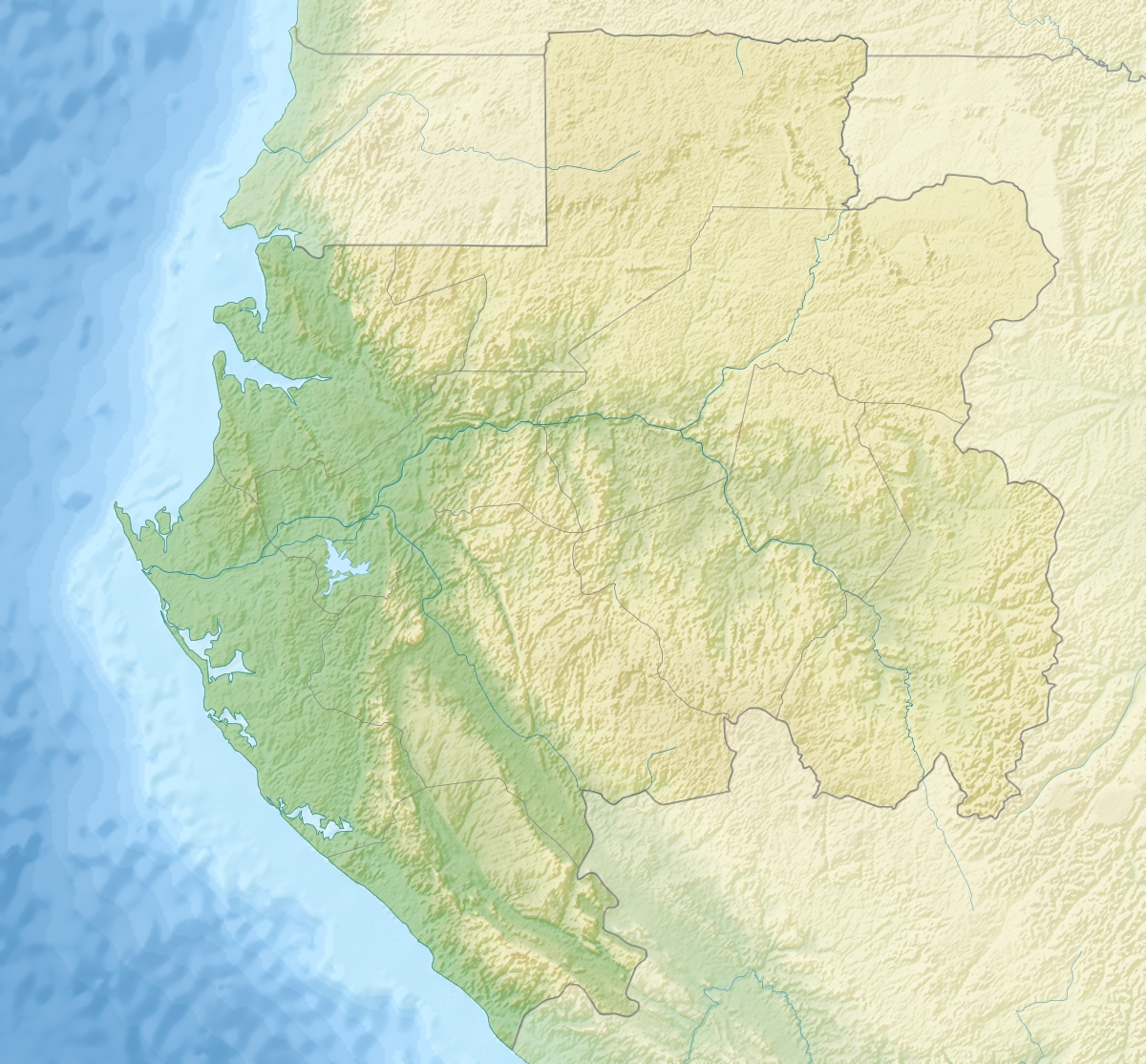
- Location within Gabon
- Location: Gabon
- Coordinates: 0°29′03″N 13°46′51″E
- Area: 1,160 km^{2} (450 sq mi)
- Governing body: National Agency for National Parks

Mwagna National Park (also Mwangné National Park, French: Parc national de Mwagna) is a national park in Gabon. It covers an area of 1,160 km^{2}.
