= Kouroufing National Park =

National park in Mali

- Parc national de Kouroufing
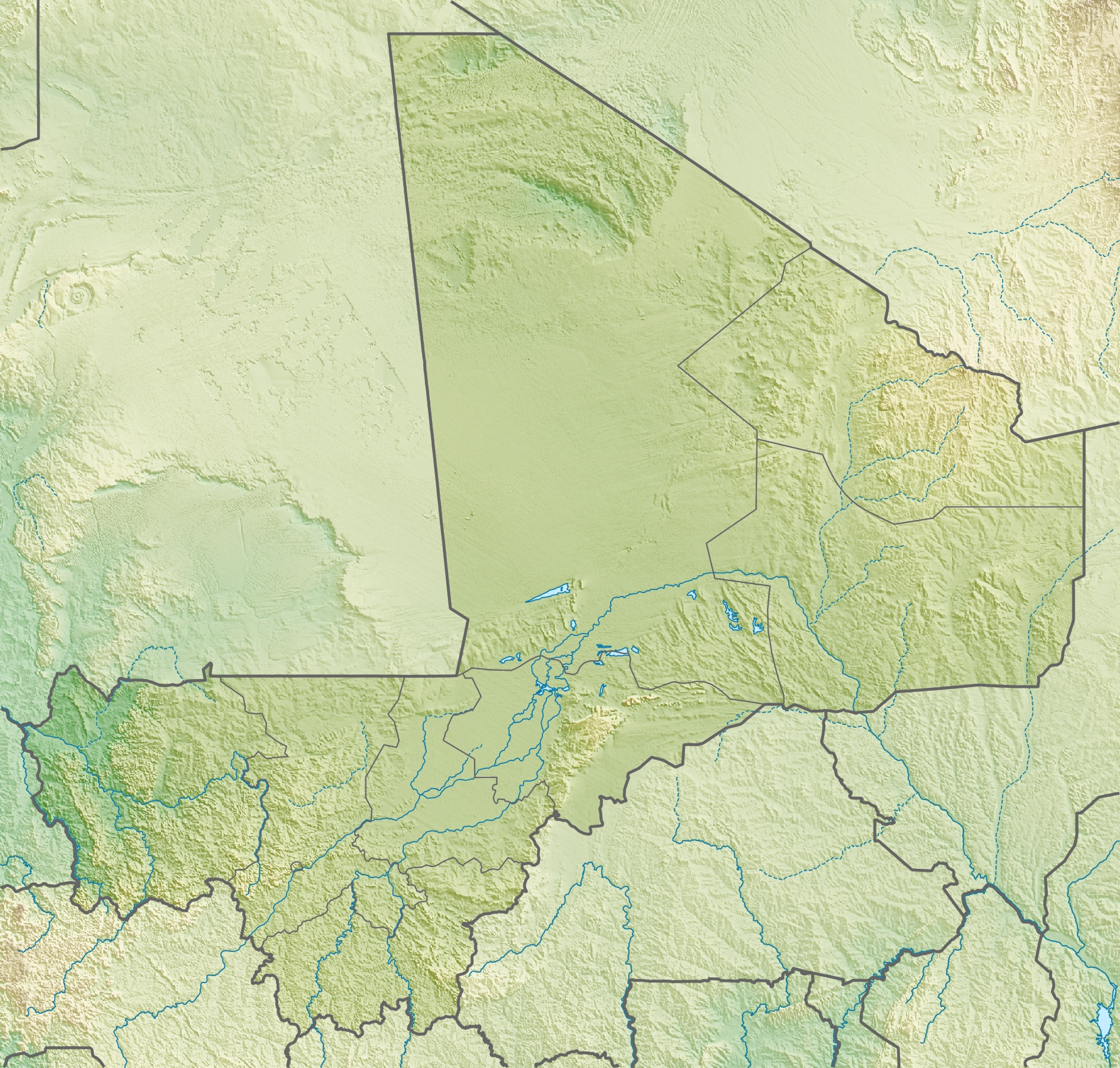
- Location within Mali
- Coordinates: 12°50′N 10°25′W
- Area: 557 km^{2} (215 sq mi)
- Established: 2002

The Kouroufing National Park (French: Parc national de Kouroufing) is found in Mali. It was established on 16 January 2002. This site is 557 km^{2}.

The park is part of the Bafing Biosphere. To the north of the park is Lake Manantali, an artificial lake.
