= List of protected areas of the Comoros =

This is a list of protected areas of the Comoros.

Park	Area in km^{2}	Date established	Island	Notes
Coelacanth National Park	92.76	2010	Grande Comore	Marine
Karthala National Park	262.14	2010	Grande Comore	Terrestrial
Mitsamiouli Ndroude National Park	23.14	2010	Grande Comore	Marine
Mohéli National Park	643.62	2010	Mohéli	Terrestrial and marine. Founded as Mohéli Marine Park in 2001. Redesignated a national park in 2010, and expanded to include most of the island's terrestrial area in 2015.
Mount Ntringui National Park	79.14	2010	Anjouan	Terrestrial
Shisiwani National Park	64.97	2010	Anjouan	Marine
Lake Dziani Boudouni (Ramsar site)	0.3	1995	Mohéli	Freshwater. Included within Mohéli National Park.
Le Karthala (Ramsar site)	130	2006	Grande Comore	Freshwater. Included within Karthala National Park.
Mount Ntringui (Ramsar site)	30	2006	Anjouan	Freshwater. Included within Mount Ntringui National Park.
