= Semenawi Bahri National Park =

National park in Eritrea

Coordinates: 15°40′N 38°53′E

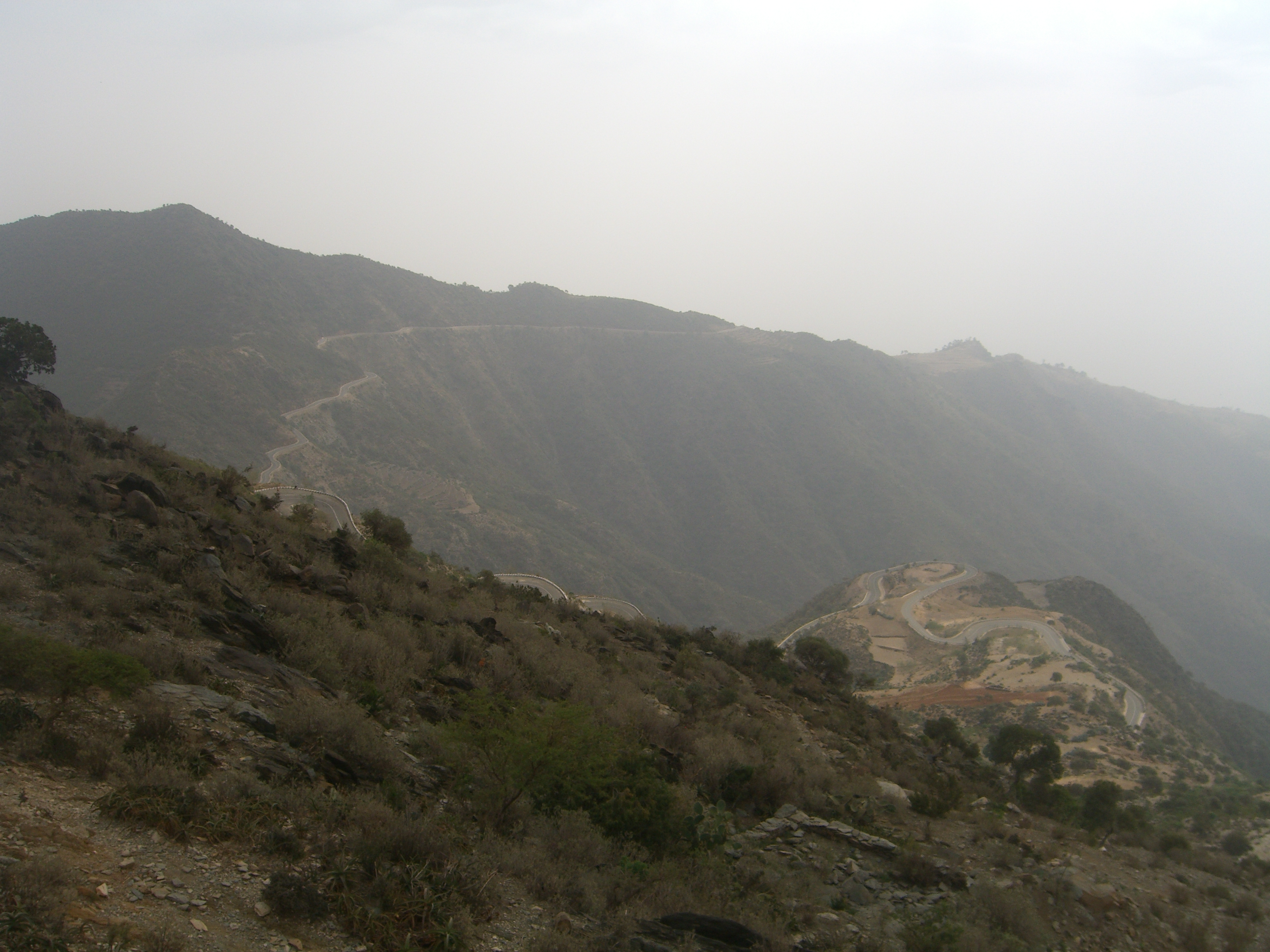

Semenawi Bahri National Park is a national park in Eritrea.

Made up of massive mountains as well as valleys, it is located at an altitude of between 900 and 2400 meters. A diverse range of wildlife live there, including duiker, klipspringer, warthog, leopard and bushbuck. Many species of birds have also been discovered recently.

A single asphalted road traverses it to facilitate transportation. The Park is also equipped with recreation centers at Meguo, Medhanit and Sabur. The Park is not well known to international and domestic tourists. However, its sights include rich flora and fauna, specifically bird-watching.
