= Magoe National Park =

National park in Mozambique

Magoe Park National Park
- Location within Mozambique
- Location: Mozambique
- Coordinates: 15°59′07″S 31°53′52″E
- Area: 3,500 km^{2} (1,400 sq mi)
- Established: October 20, 2013

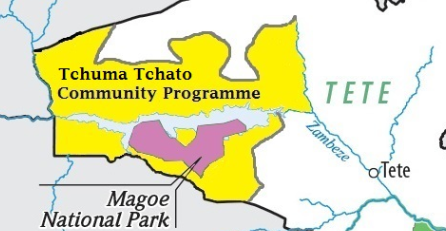
Mágoè National Park

Magoe National Park is a protected area in Tete Province, Mozambique. The park was proclaimed in December 2013. Previously the area was an integral part of the Tchuma Tchato Community wildlife management program.

== Location ==
The park is 3,559 square kilometres (1,374 sq mi) in area and is situated on the southern bank of the giant Cahora Bassa Dam.
