= Lofa-Mano National Park =

Proposed national park in Liberia

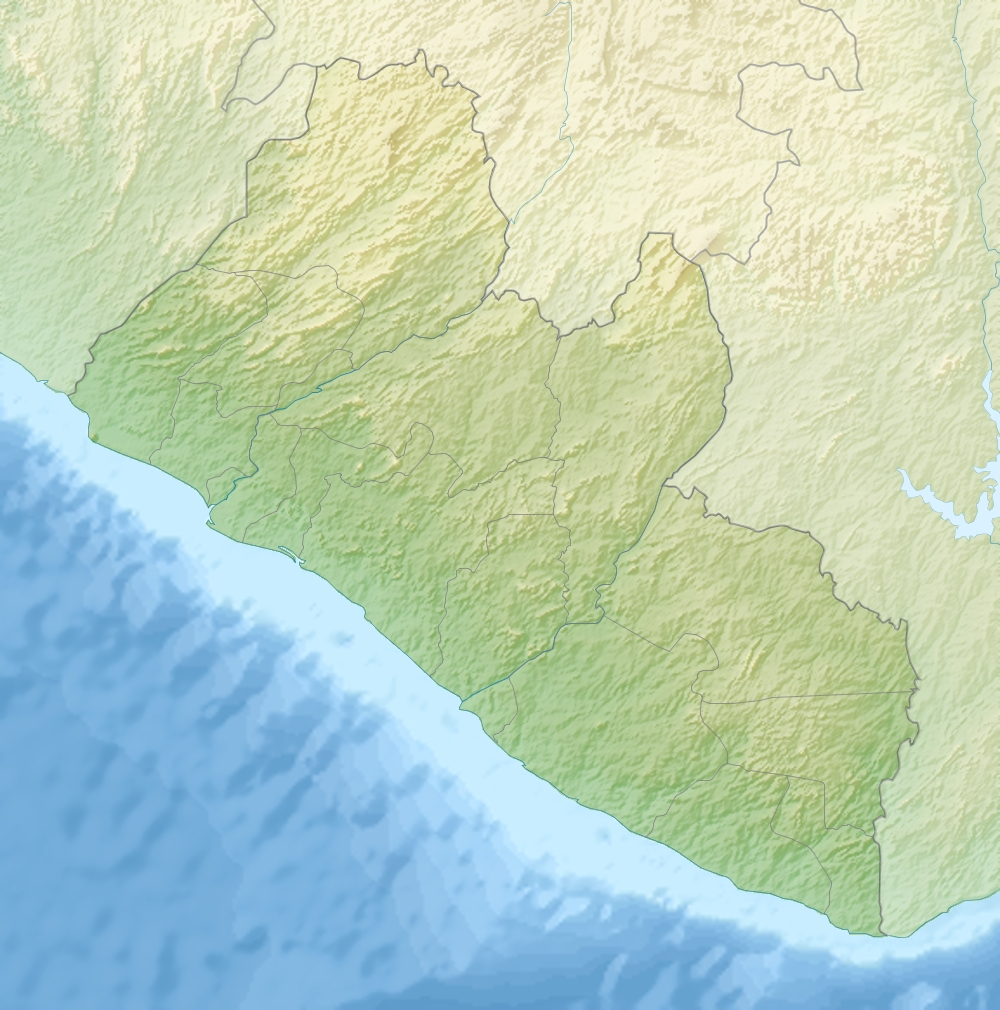
- Location within Liberia
- Location: Liberia
- Coordinates: 7°28′00″N 10°35′00″W
- Area: 2,300 square kilometres (890 sq mi)

The Lofa-Mano National Park is a proposed national park in Liberia. It was proposed in 1979. This site is 2,300 square kilometres (890 sq mi). The park was proposed to protect an area of unexploited forest in the north-west of the country, bordering Sierra Leone, an area described ecologically at the time as "certainly the most abundant in Liberia". The national park area would complement the adjoining Gola Forest area of Sierra Leone.

== Environment ==
The area has a high value of biodiversity, where over 60 globally endangered species live, and it is also a critical corridor for wildlife. The forests are home to several threatened birds, and the site has been designated an Important Bird Area (IBA) by BirdLife International because it supports significant populations of many bird species.
