= Abughilan National Park =

National park in Libya

- IUCN category II (national park)
- Location within Libya
- Location: Libya
- Coordinates: 32.265°N 13.030°E
- Area: 40 km^{2} (15 sq mi)
- Established: 1992

Abughilan National Park is a national park in Libya. It was established in 1992 and covers an area of 4,000 hectares (9,900 acres).
