= List of national parks in Africa =

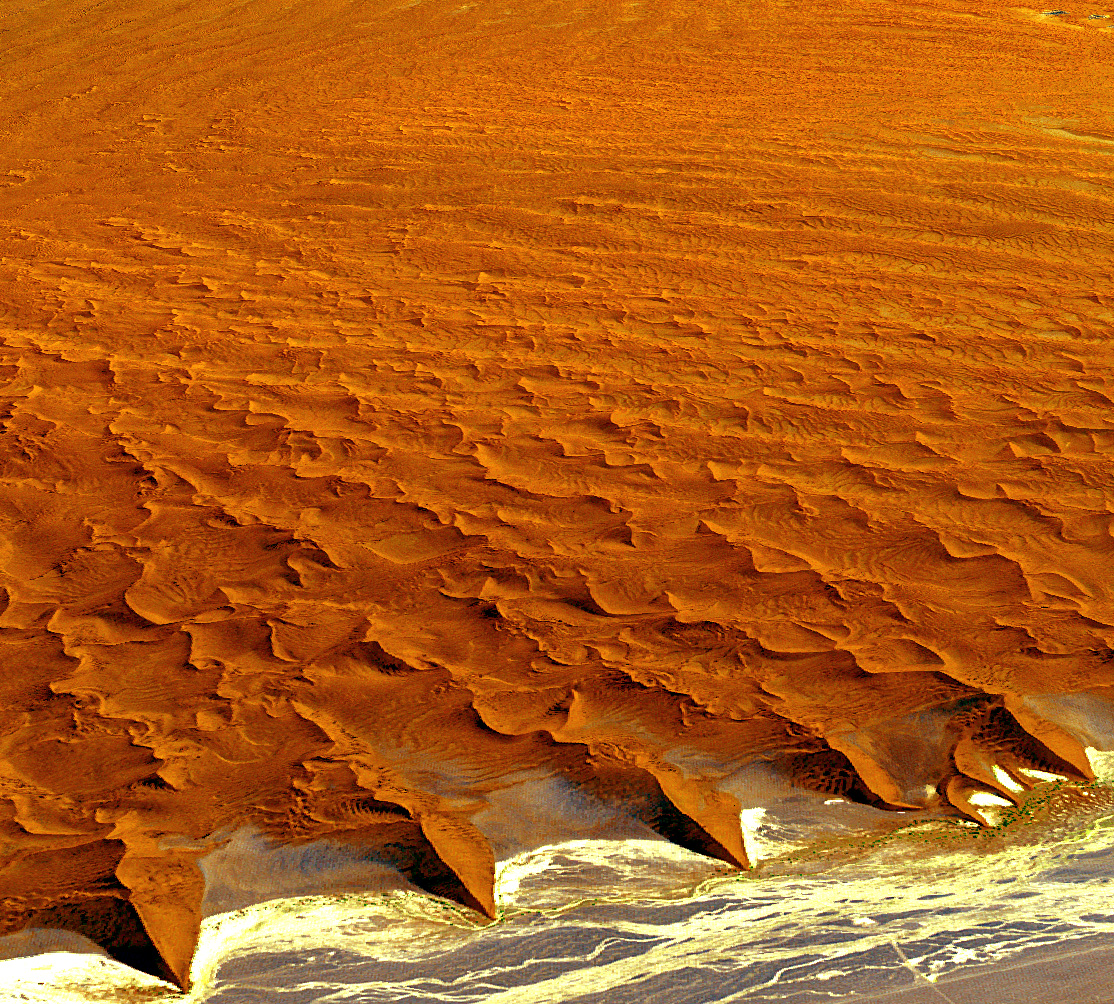
Namib-Naukluft National Park in Namibia

This is a list of national parks in Africa. The nature of the parks varies considerably not only between countries but also within some nations - the degree of protection, accessibility and type of environment for which it is intended to deliver protection. Some parks have been cleared of their original human population, others have always been essentially uninhabited, while yet others contain significant population centers.

National parks can be found in a large majority of African countries, being most numerous in Gabon, Kenya and Tanzania. Some nations also have considerable areas designated as private parks, game reserves, forest reserves, marine reserves, national reserves and natural parks. These are not included in the list below, even though some of these may resemble some national parks. For more information on such zones, see the individual articles on each country.

== Algeria ==
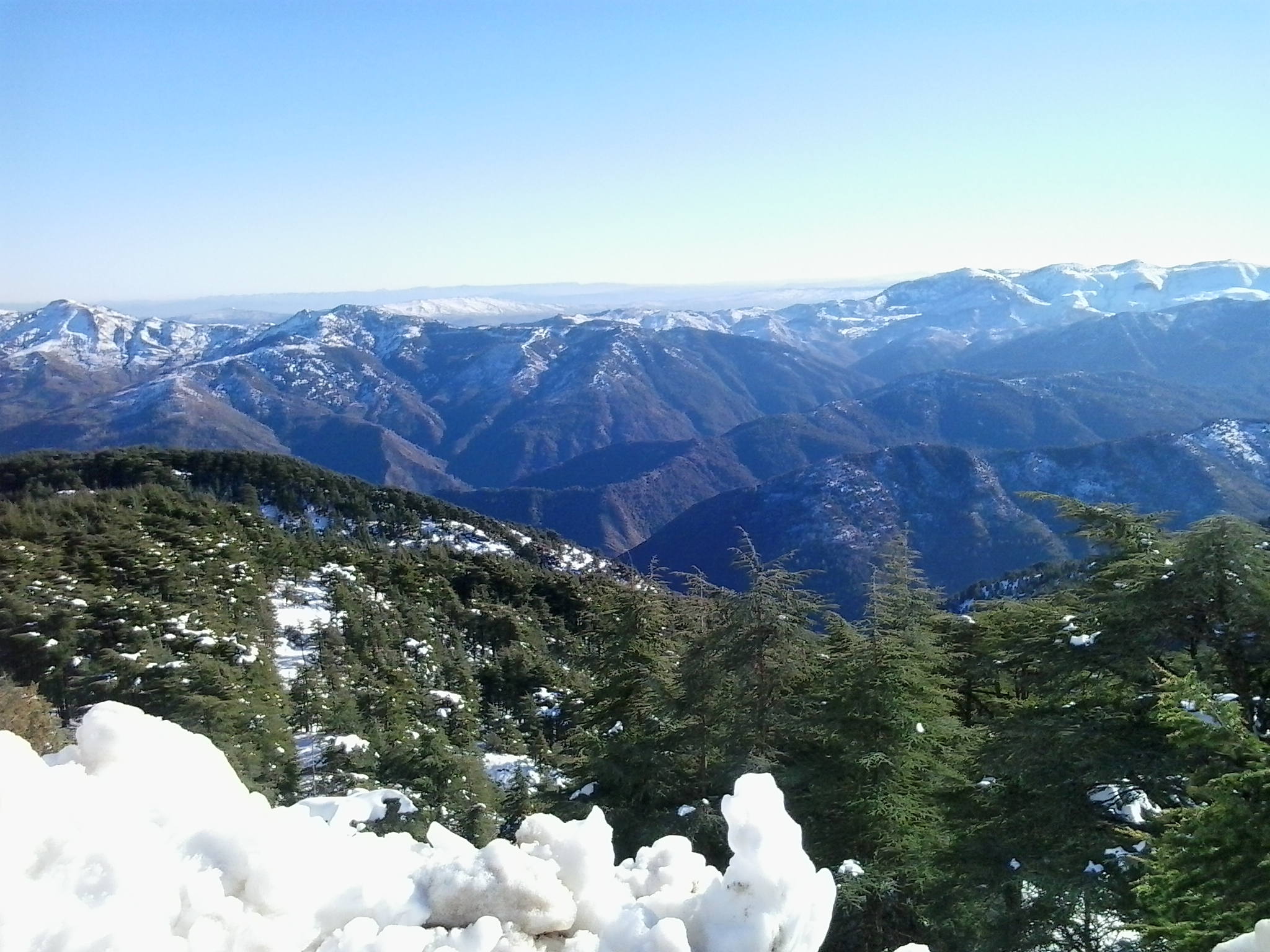
Chrea National Park

- Ahaggar National Park
- Belezma National Park
- Chrea National Park
- Djebel Aissa National Park
- Djurdjura National Park
- El Kala National Park
- Gouraya National Park
- Taza National Park
- Tassili n'Ajjer National Park
- Theniet El Had National Park
- Tlemcen National Park

== Angola ==
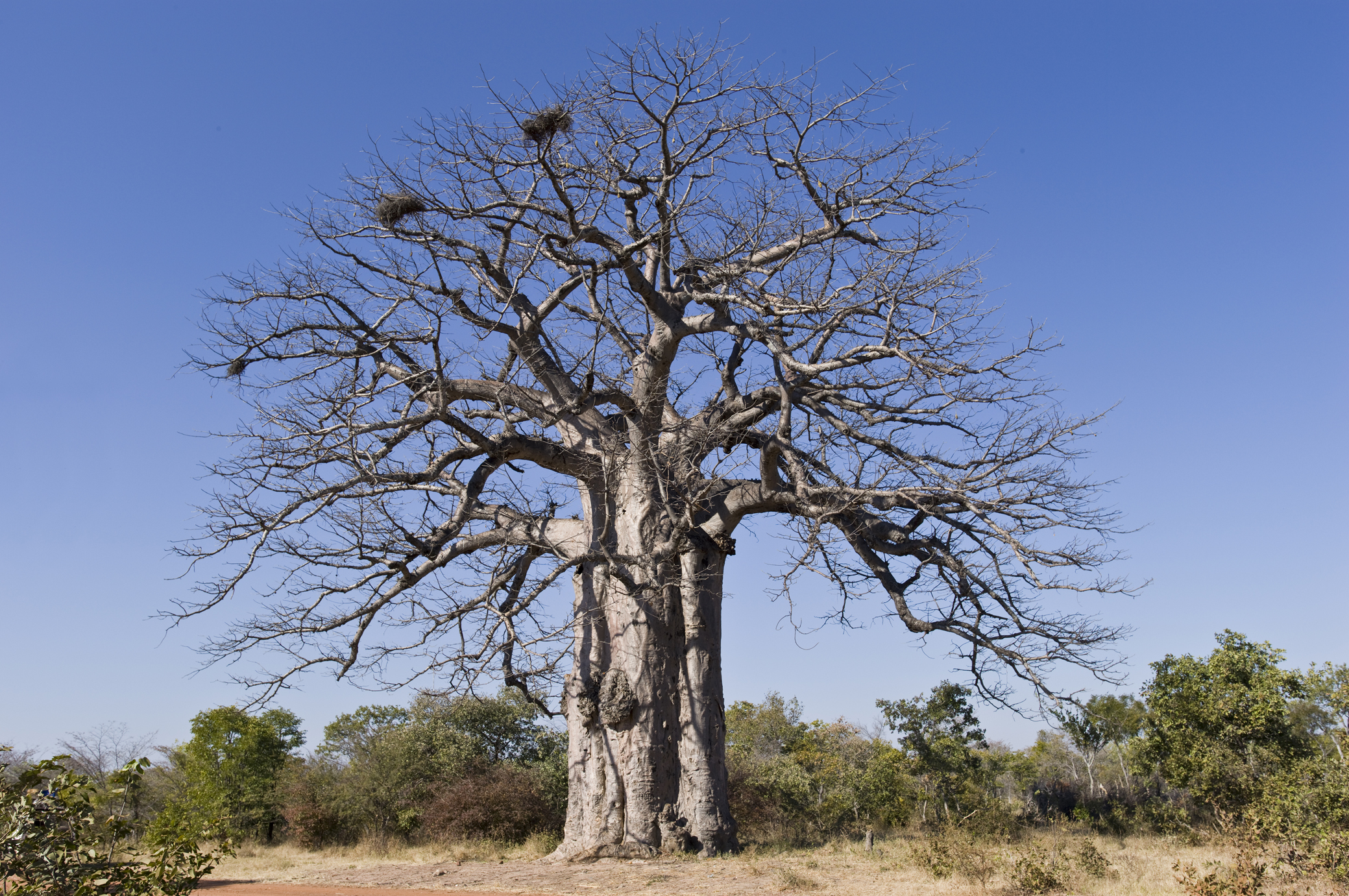
Baobab, Iona National Park, Angola

- Bicauri National Park
- Cameia National Park
- Cangandala National Park
- Iona National Park
- Longa-Mavinga National Park
- Luengue-Luiana National Park
- Mupa National Park
- Quiçama National Park

== Benin ==
- Pendjari National Park
- W of the Niger National Park

== Botswana ==
- Chobe National Park
- Kgalagadi Transfrontier Park
- Makgadikgadi Pans National Park
- Nxai Pan National Park

== Burkina Faso ==
- Arli National Park
- Deux Balés National Park
- Kaboré Tambi National Park (formerly Pô National Park), existing since 1976
- W of the Niger National Park, existing since 1957

== Burundi ==
- Kibira National Park
- Rusizi National Park
- Ruvubu National Park

== Cameroon ==
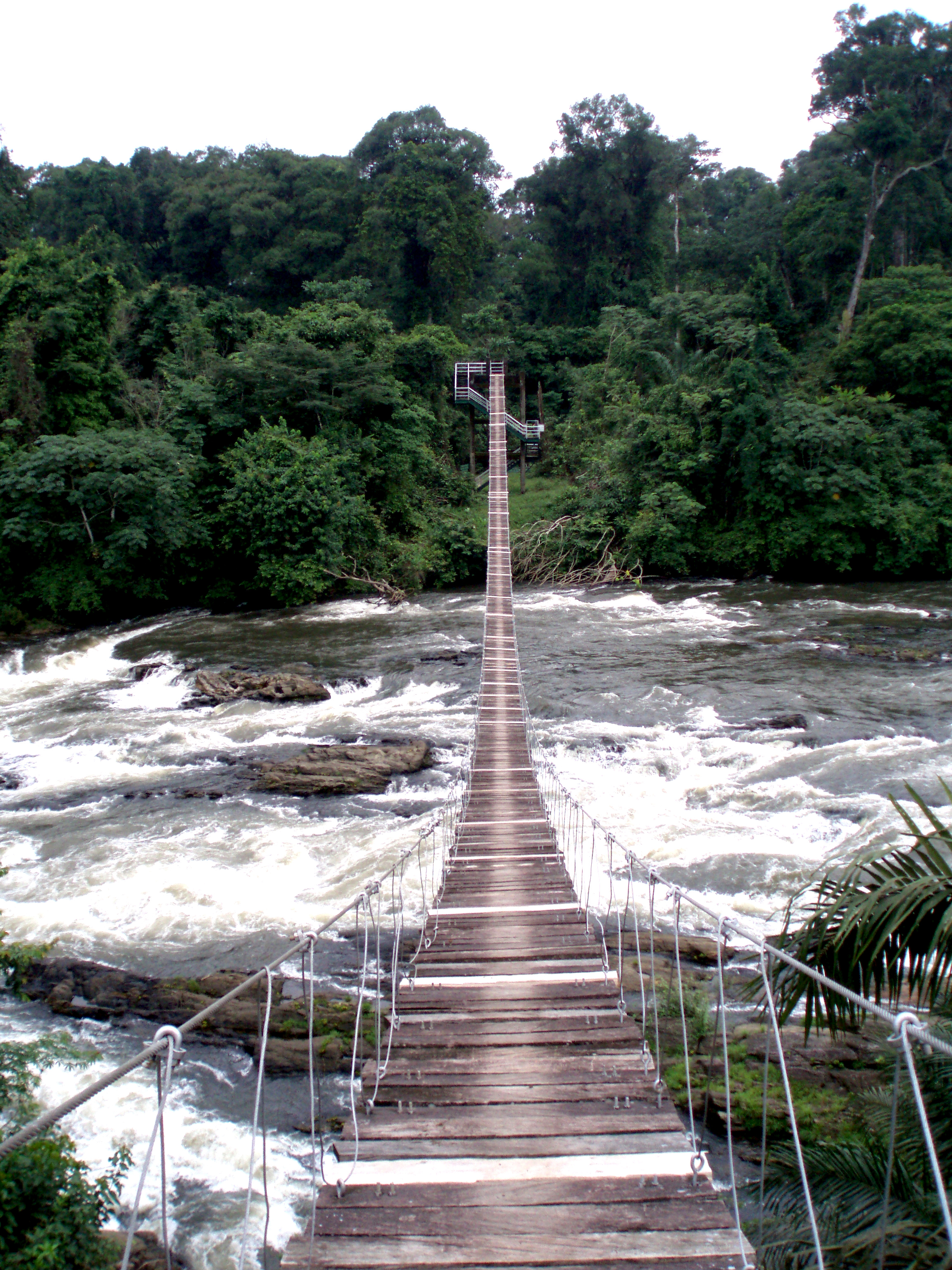
Korup Official entrance

- Bakossi National Park
- Bénoué National Park

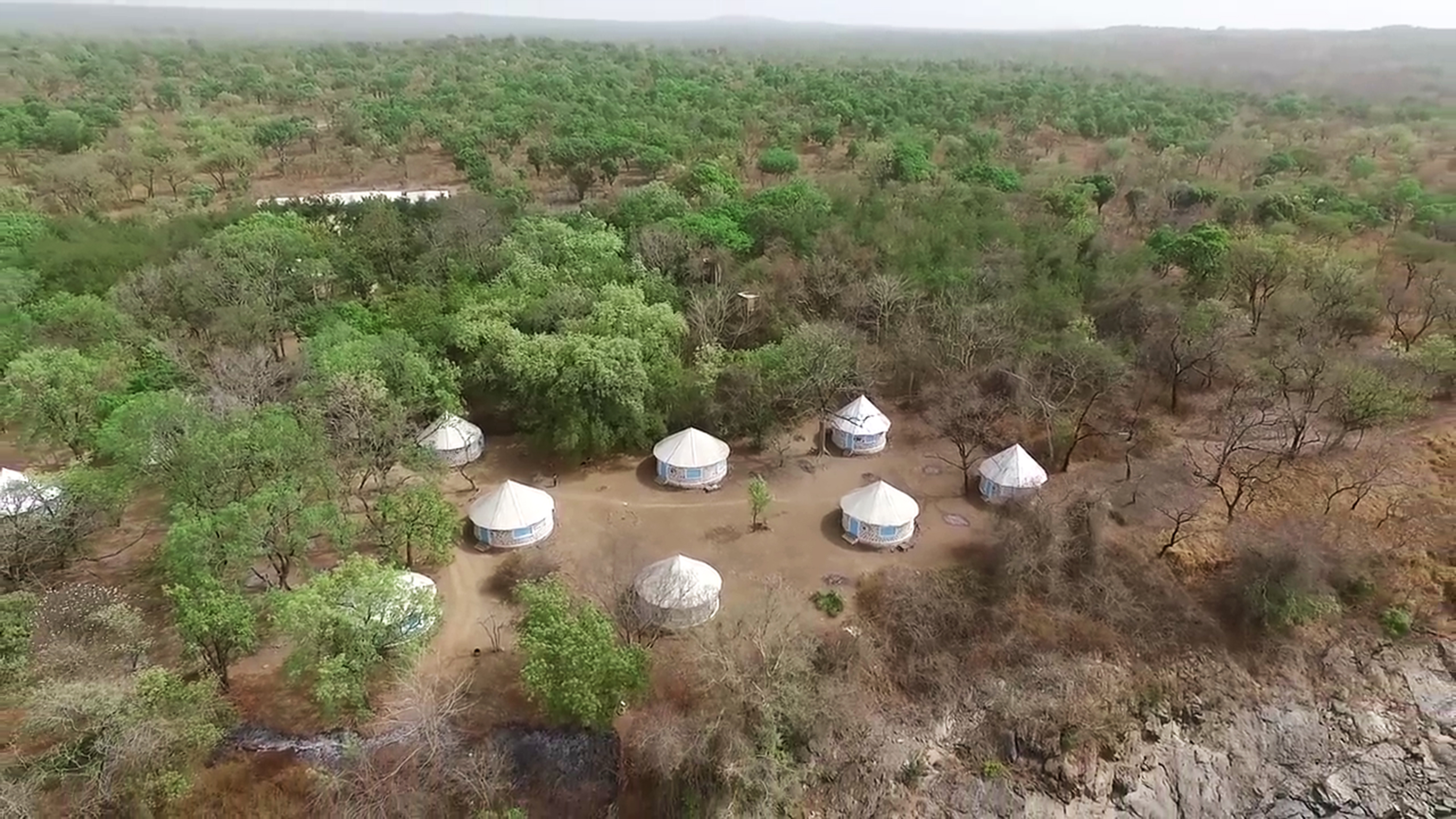
Drone view Benoue

- Bouba Njida National Park
- Boumba Bek National Park
- Campo Ma'an National Park
- Deng Deng National Park
- Douala Edéa National Park

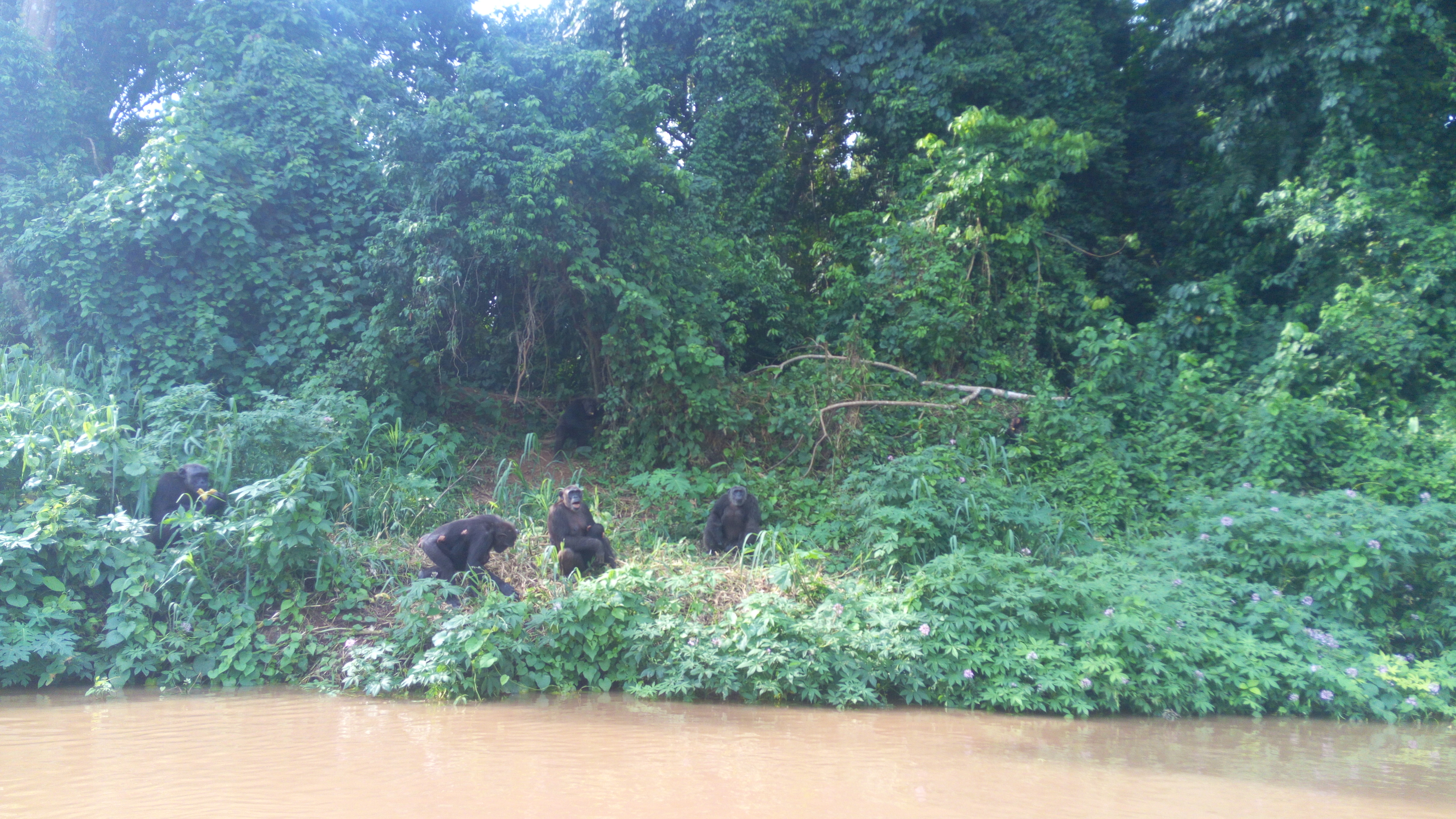
Douala Edéa National Park

- Faro National Park
- Kimbi-Fungom National Park
- Korup National Park

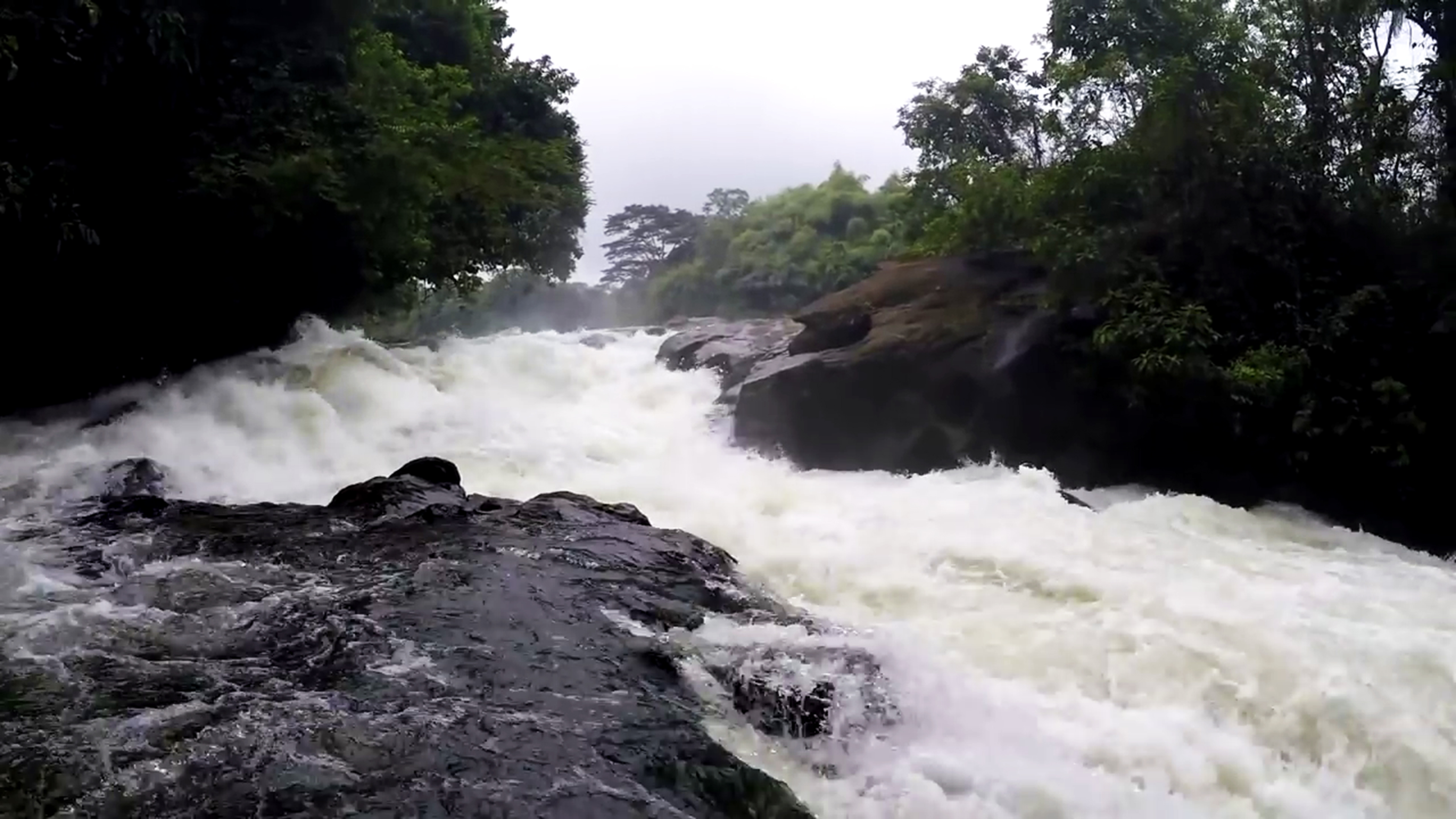
Korup National park

- Lobéké National Park
- Mbam Djerem National Park
- Mbéré Valley National Park
- Mount Cameroon National Park

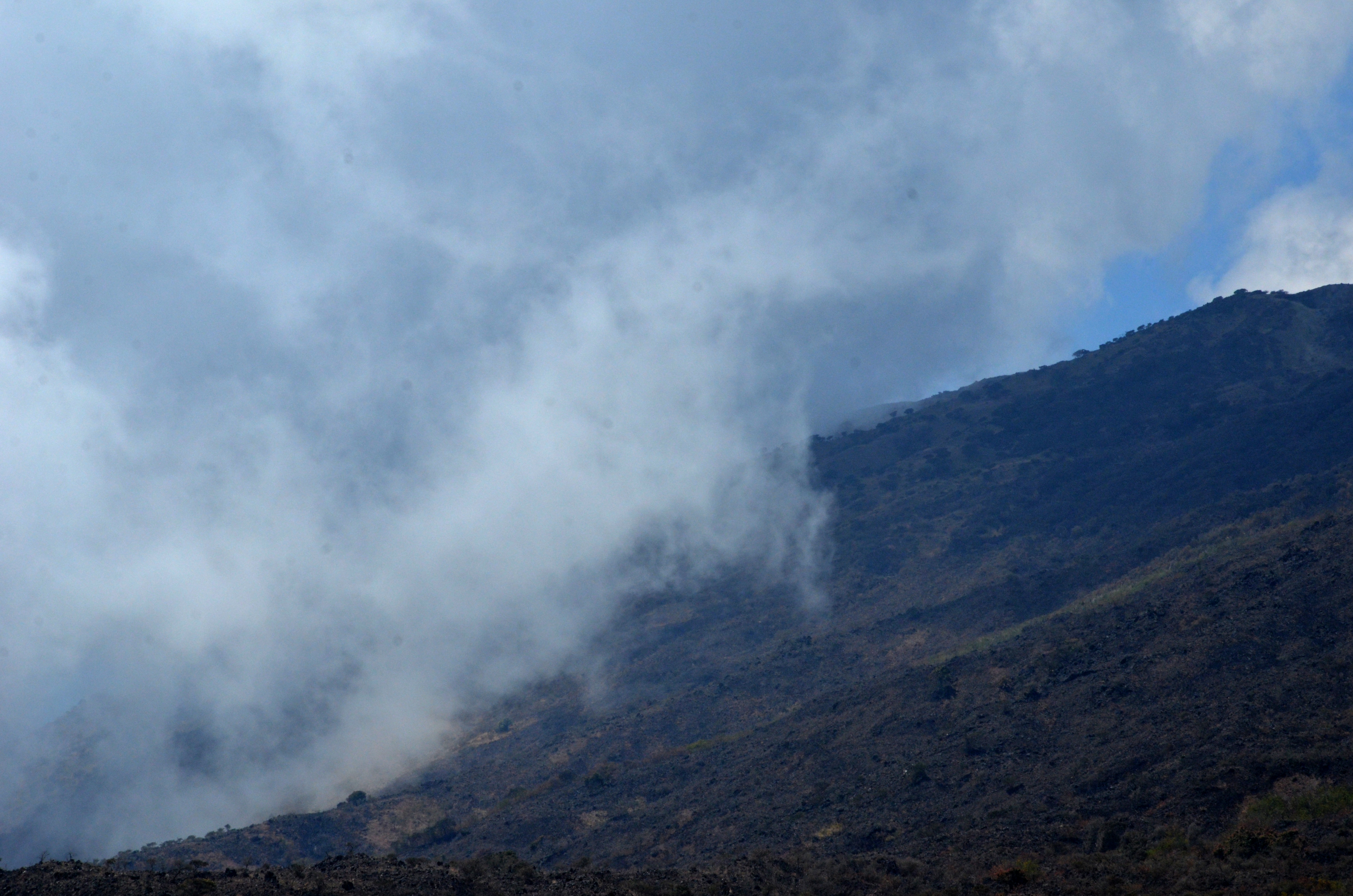
Mont Cameroun11

- Mpem and Djim National Park
- Nki National Park
- Takamanda National Park
- Tchabal Mbabo National Park
- Waza National Park

== Cape Verde ==
- Fogo National Park

== Central African Republic ==
- André Félix National Park
- Bamingui-Bangoran National Park
- Dzanga-Ndoki National Park
- Mbaéré Bodingué National Park
- St Floris National Park

== Chad ==
- Aouk National Park
- Goz Beïda National Park
- Manda National Park
- Siniaka-Minia National Park
- Zakouma National Park

== Comoros ==
- Coelacanth National Park
- Karthala National Park
- Mitsamiouli Ndroude National Park
- Mohéli National Park
- Mount Ntringui National Park
- Shisiwani National Park

== Democratic Republic of the Congo ==
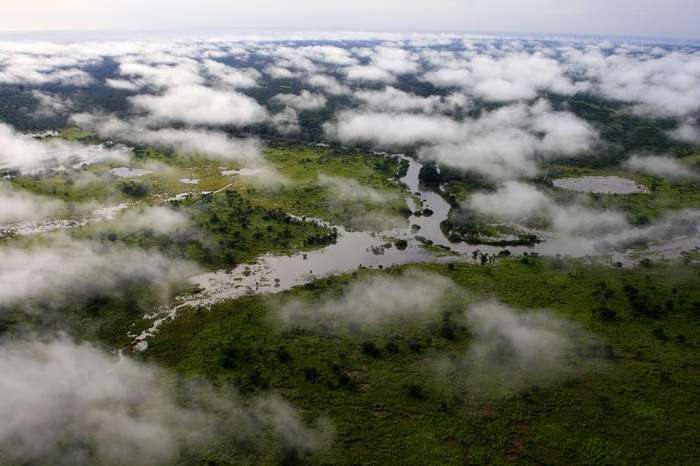
Aerial view of Garamba

- Garamba National Park
- Kahuzi-Biéga National Park
- Kundelungu National Park
- Lomami National Park
- Maiko National Park
- Mangroves National Park
- Okapi Wildlife Reserve (Note: This is not a national park. This is a reserve with core protection and multi-use areas.)
- Salonga National Park (North and South sections)
- Upemba National Park
- Virunga National Park

== Republic of the Congo ==
- Conkouati-Douli National Park
- Nouabalé-Ndoki National Park
- Ntokou-Pikounda National Park
- Odzala-Kokoua National Park
- Ougoue Lekiti National Park

== Djibouti ==
- Day Forest National Park
- Yoboki National Park

== Egypt ==
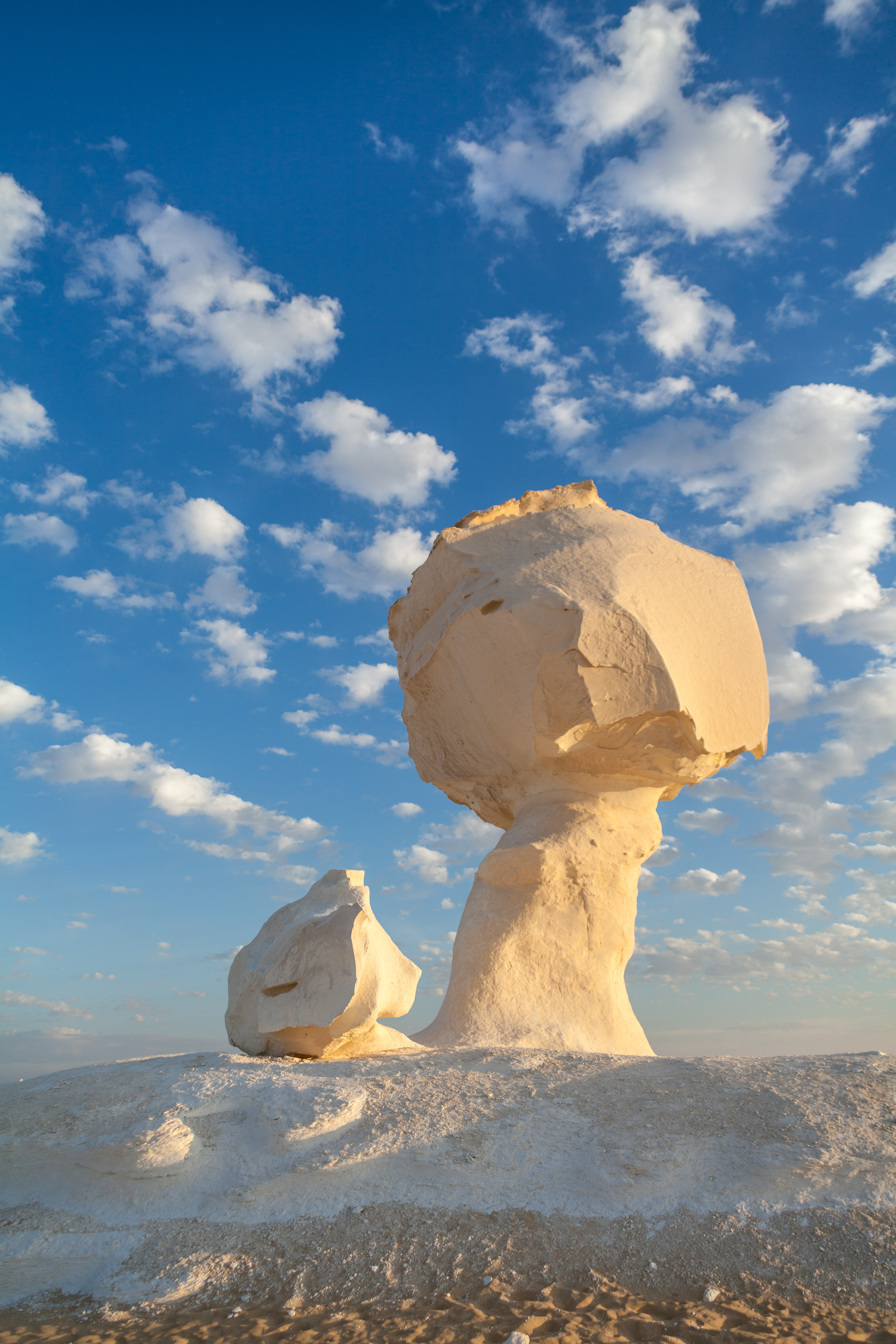
Rock formations at White Desert National Park

- Gabal Elba National Park
- Gilf Kebir National Park
- Lake Burullus Protectorate
- Lake Qarun Protectorate
- Nabq Protected Area
- Ras Muhammad National Park
- Saint Katherine Protectorate
- Sannur Valley Cave Protectorate
- Siwa Oasis
- Taba Protected Area
- Wadi Allaqi Biosphere Reserve
- Wadi El Gamal National Park
- Wadi El Rayan Protectorate
- White Desert National Park

== Equatorial Guinea ==
- Altos de Nsork National Park
- Monte Alén National Park
- Pico Basilé National Park

== Eritrea ==
- Dahlak Marine National Park
- Semenawi Bahri National Park

== Eswatini ==
- Hlane Royal National Park

== Ethiopia ==
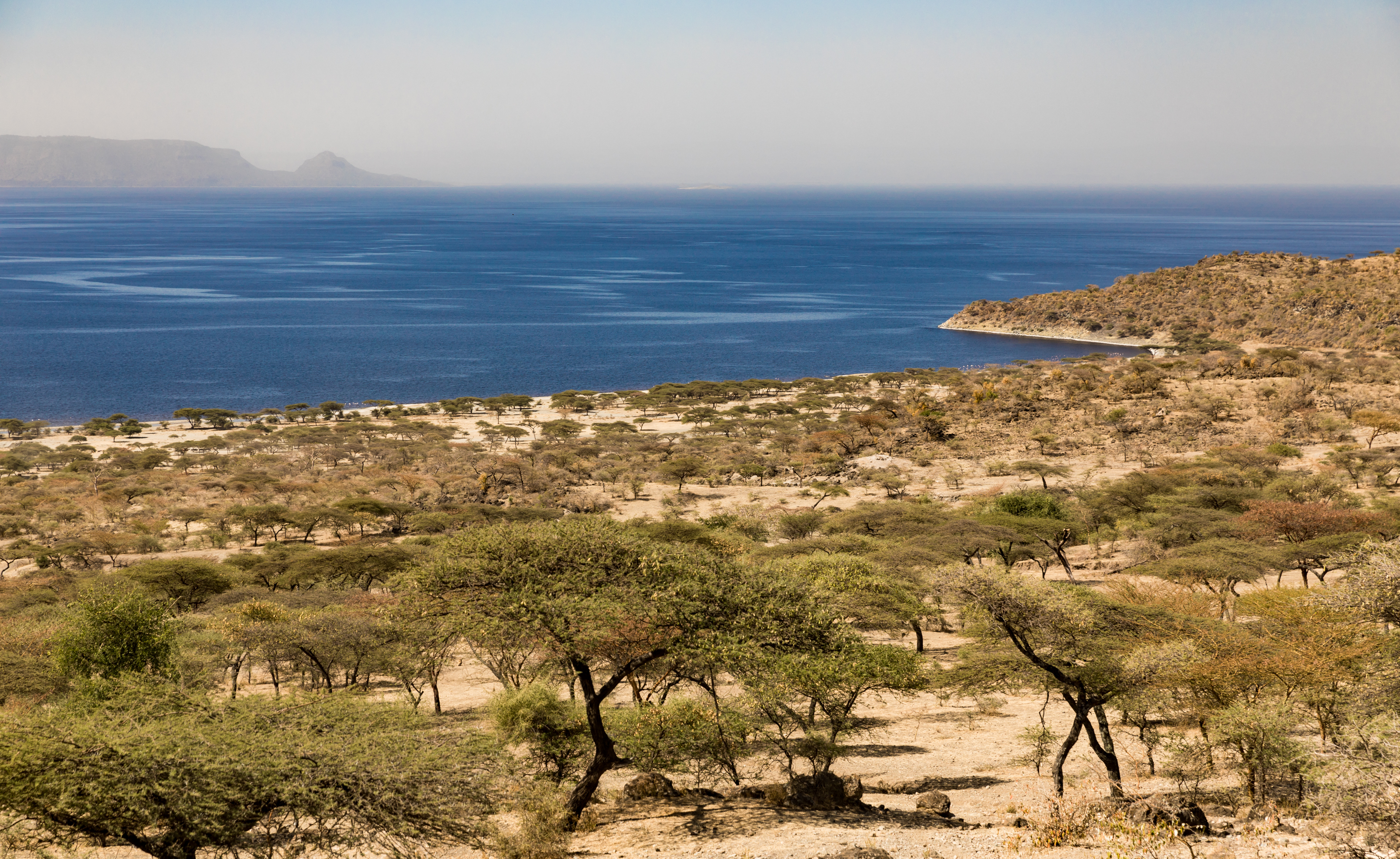
Lake Shalla

- Abidjatta-Shalla National Park
- Alitash National Park
- Arsi Mountains National Park
- Awash National Park
- Bale Mountains National Park
- Bejimiz National Park
- Borena National Park
- Chebera Churchura National Park
- Dhati-Welel National Park
- Didessa National Park
- Gambela National Park
- Geralle National Park
- Gibe Sheleko National Park
- Kafta-Shiraro National Park
- Loka-Abaya National Park
- Mago National Park
- Maze National Park
- Mao-Komo National Park
- Nechisar National Park
- Omo National Park
- Simien Mountains National Park
- Yangudi Rassa National Park

== Gabon ==
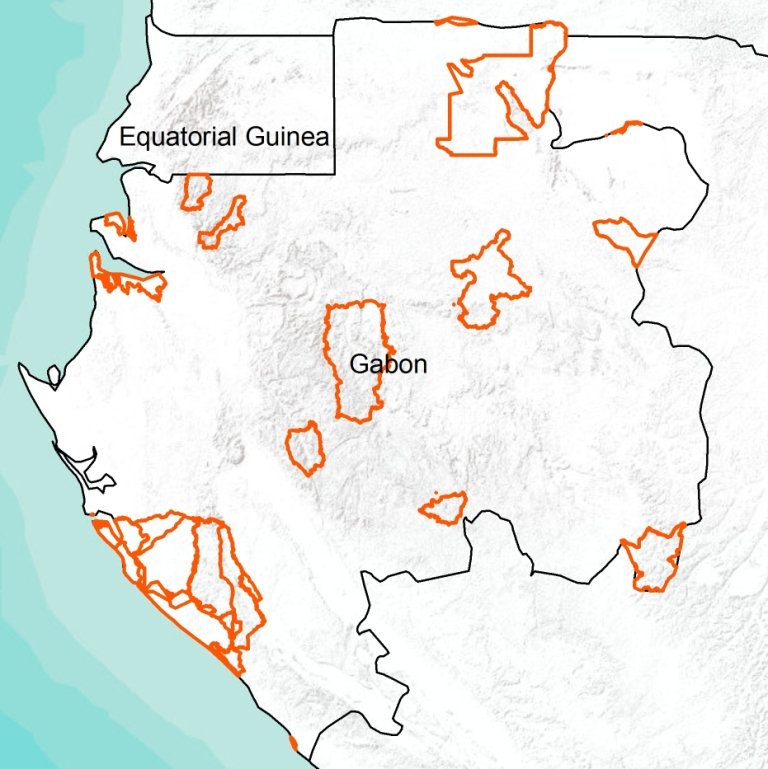
National Park system of Gabon

- Akanda National Park
- Batéké Plateau National Park
- Birougou National Park
- Crystal Mountains National Park
- Ivindo National Park
- Loango National Park
- Lopé National Park
- Mayumba National Park
- Minkébé National Park
- Moukalaba-Doudau National Park
- Mwangné National Park
- Pongara National Park
- Waka National Park

== The Gambia ==
- Abuko National Park
- Bijilo National Park
- Kiang West National Park
- Niumi National Park
- River Gambia National Park

== Ghana ==
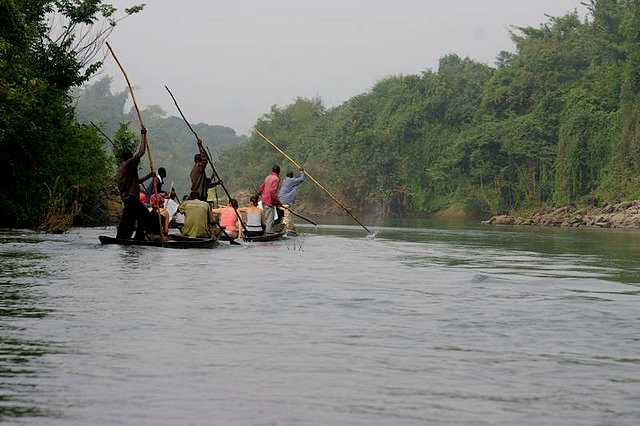
Bui National Park

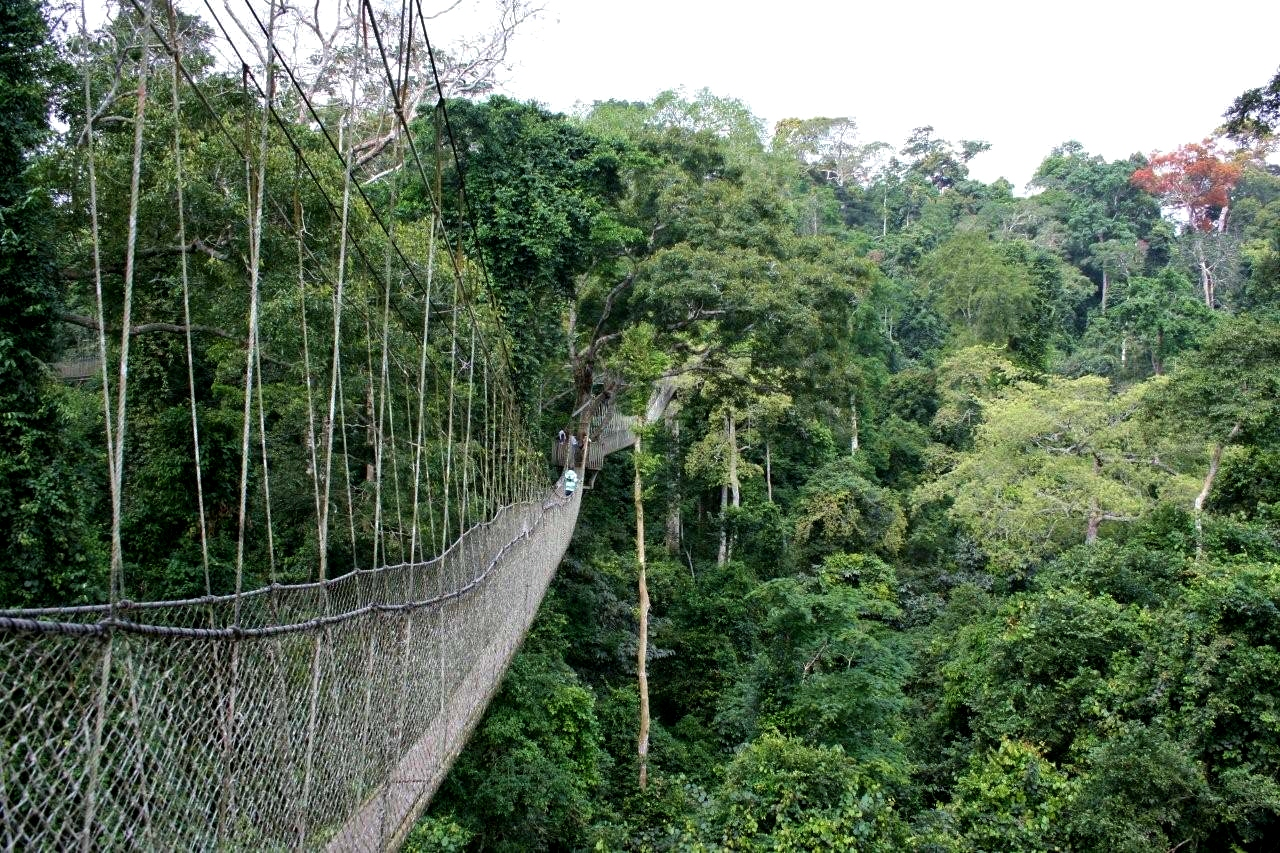
Kakum National Park

- Bia National Park
- Bui National Park
- Digya National Park
- Kakum National Park
- Kalakpa Game Production Reserve
- Mole National Park
- Nini-Suhien National Park

== Guinea ==
- Badiar National Park
- Haut Niger National Park

== Guinea-Bissau ==
- Boé National Park
- Cantanhez Forest National Park
- João Vieira and Poilão Marine National Park
- Cufada National Park
- Dulombi National Park
- Orango National Park
- Varela National Park

=== Natural Parks ===
- Cacheu River Mangroves Natural Park

== Ivory Coast ==
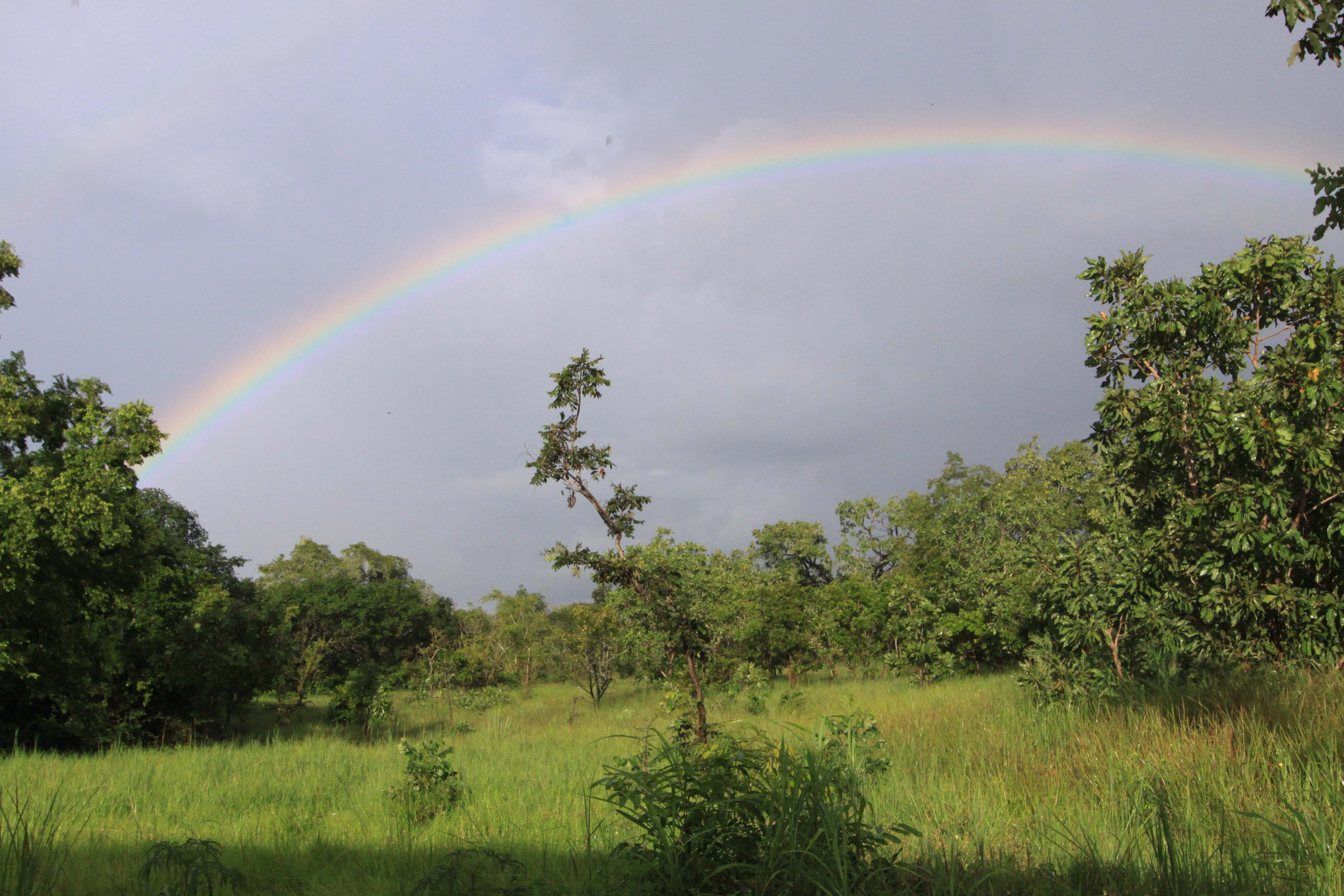
Comoé Savannah with rainbow

- Assagny National Park
- Banco National Park
- Comoé National Park
- Îles Ehotilés National Park
- Marahoué National Park
- Mount Nimba National Park
- Mont Péko National Park
- Mont Sângbé National Park
- Taï National Park

== Kenya ==
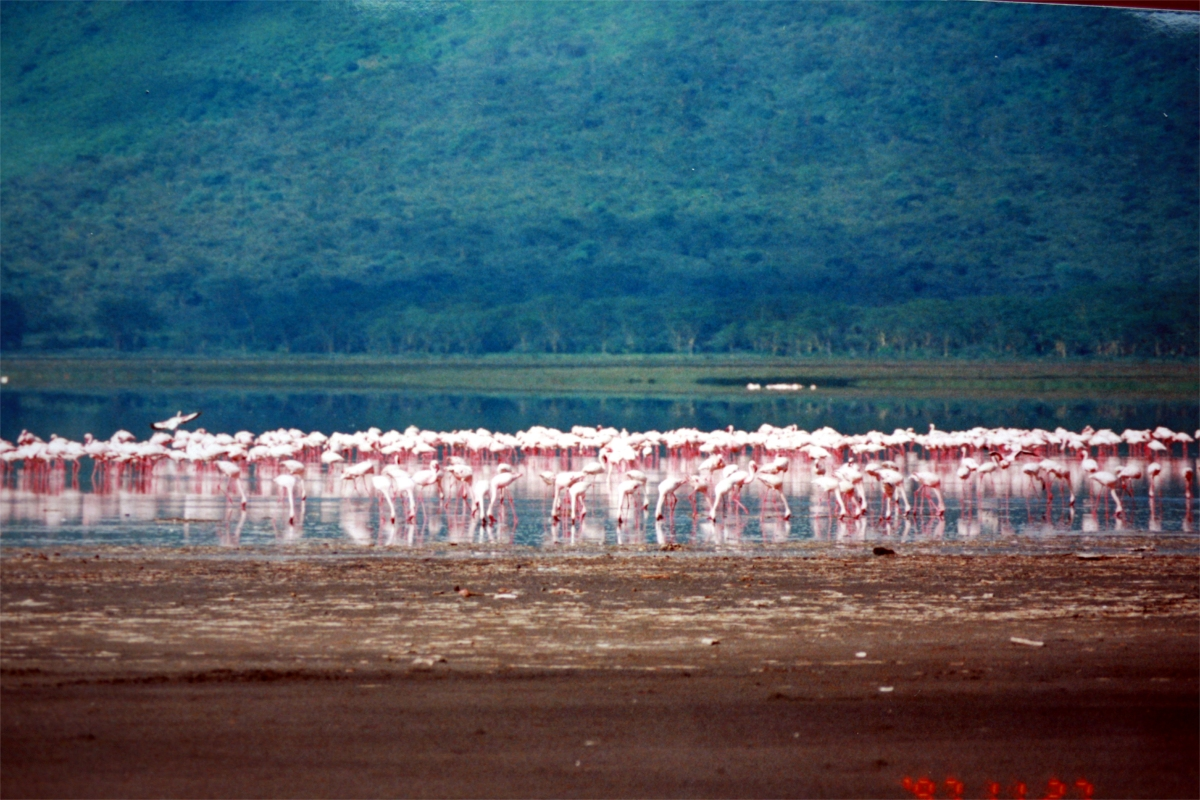
Flamingos at Lake Nakuru

- Aberdare National Park
- Amboseli National Park
- Arabuko Sokoke National Park
- Central Island National Park
- Chyulu Hills National Park
- Hell's Gate National Park
- Kisite-Mpunguti Marine National Park
- Lake Nakuru National Park
- Malindi Marine National Park
- Malka Mari National Park
- Marsabit National Park
- Meru National Park
- Mombasa Marine Park
- Mount Elgon National Park
- Mount Kenya National Park
- Mount Longonot National Park
- Nairobi National Park
- Ol Donyo Sabuk National Park
- Ruma National Park
- Saiwa Swamp National Park
- Samburu National Reserve
- Sibiloi National Park
- Tsavo East National Park and Tsavo West National Park
- Watamu Marine National Park

== Lesotho ==
- Sehlabathebe National Park
- Ts'ehlanyane National Park

== Liberia ==
- Sapo National Park
- Gola Forest National Park
- Kpo Mountains
- Grand Kru-River Gee
- Bong Mountain
- Foya National Park
- Gbi National Park
- Nimba West

== Libya ==
- Abughilan National Park
- El-Kouf National Park
- Karabolli National Park
- El Naggaza National Park
- Rajma National Park
- Sirman National Park (Surman)

== Madagascar ==
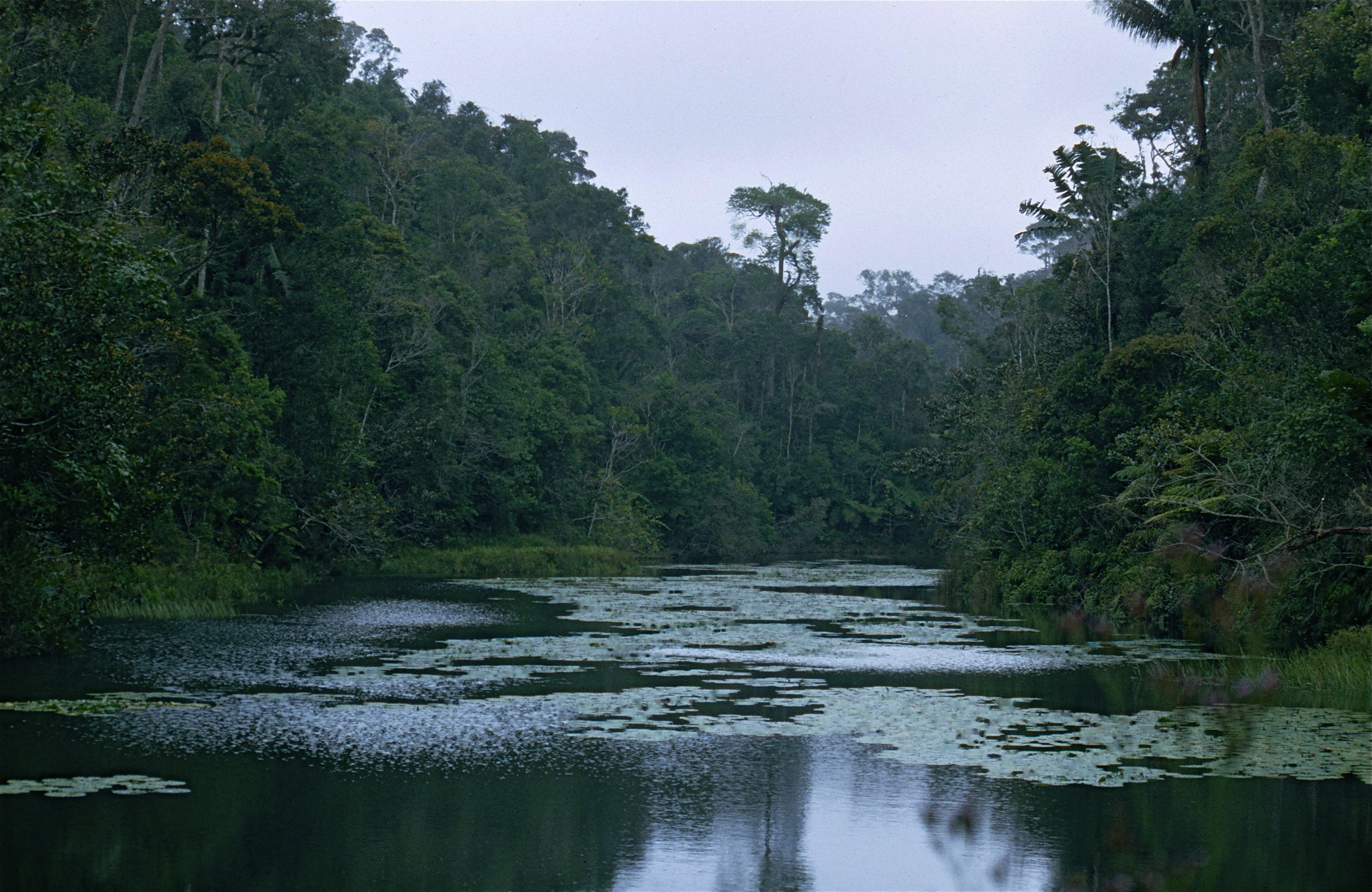
Analamazaotra Special Reserve, November 1998

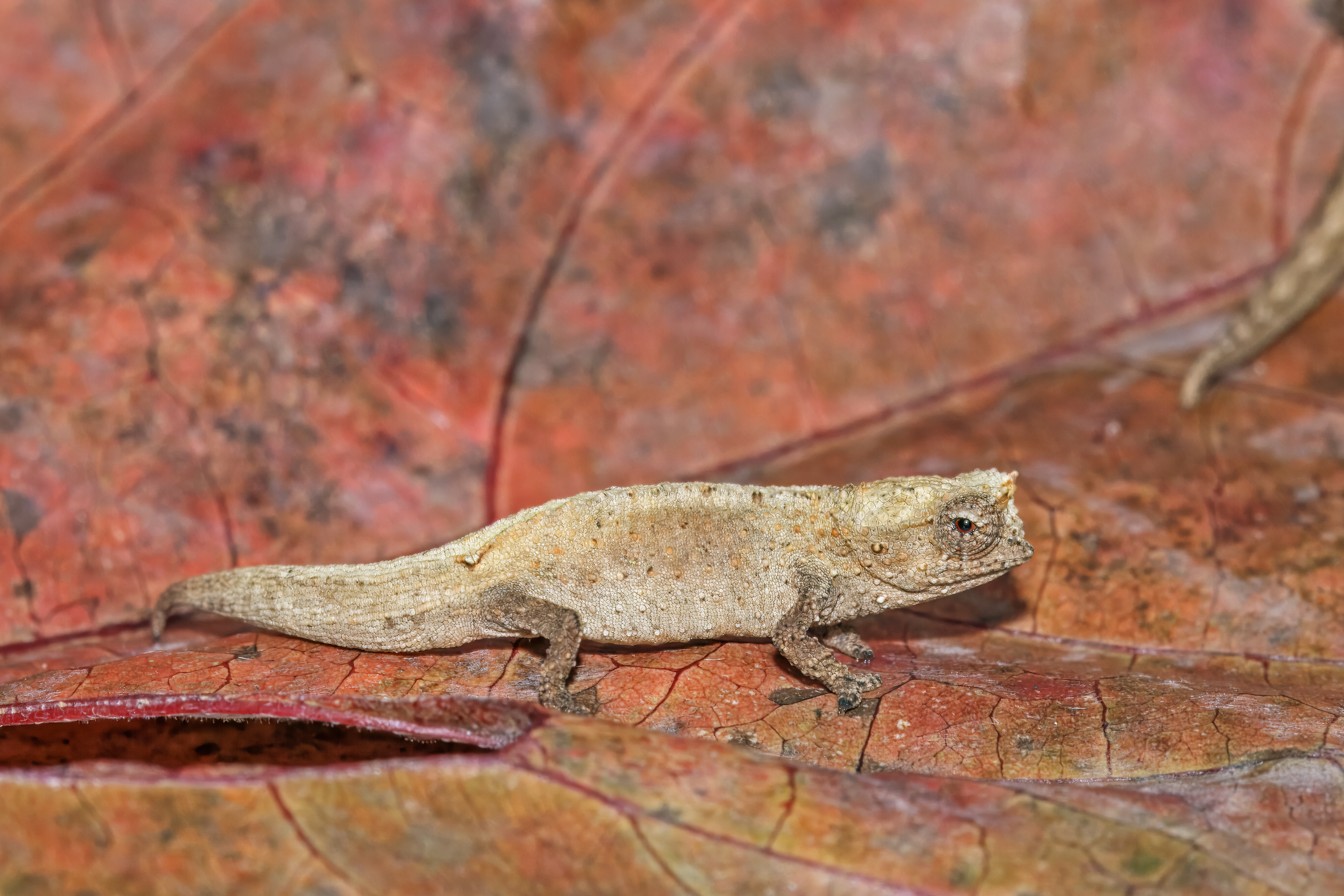
Chameleon in Amber Mountain

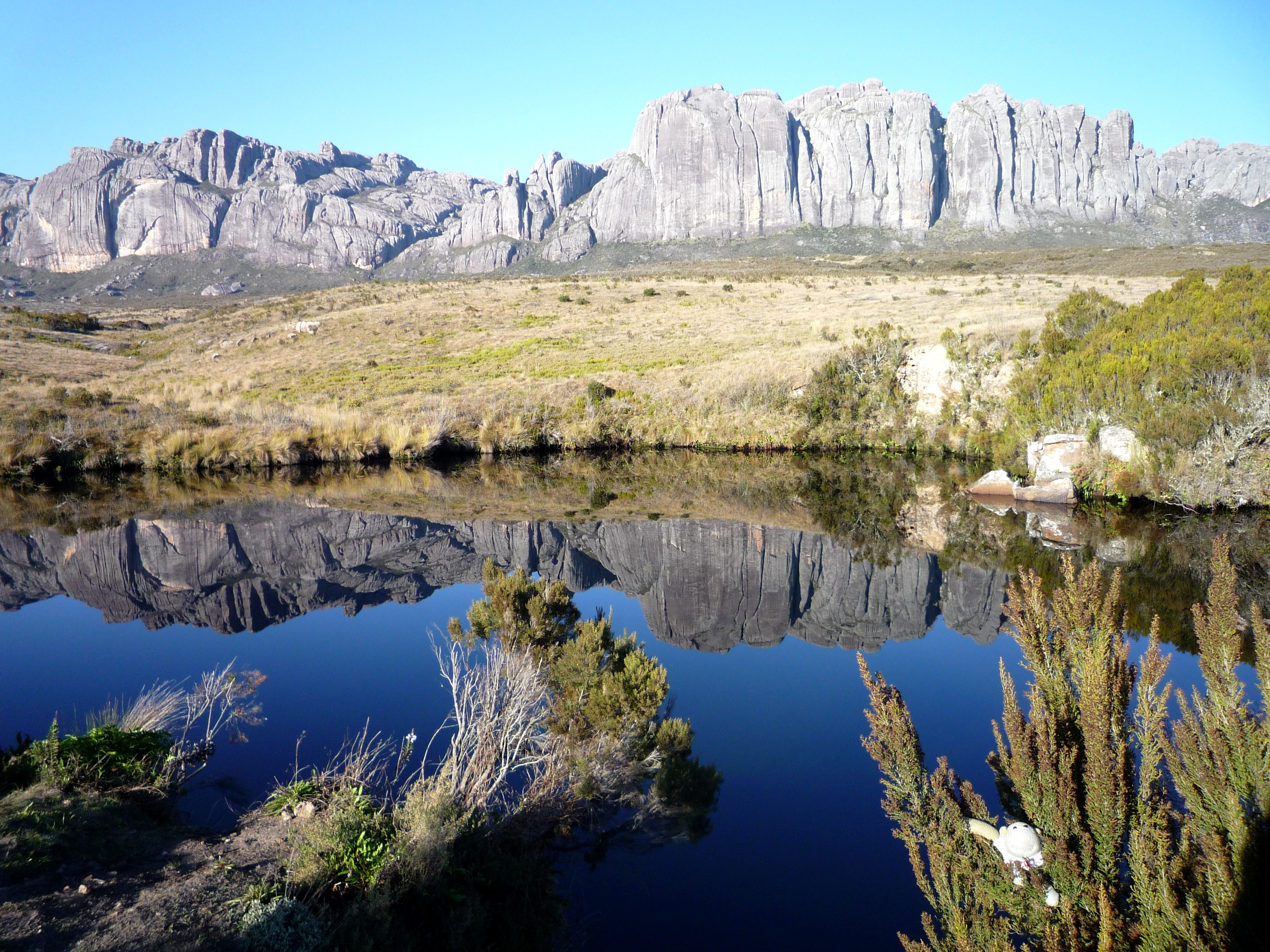
Andringitra National Park

- Amber Mountain National Park
- Analamazaotra National Park
- Andohahela National Park
- Andringitra National Park
- Ankarafantsika National Park
- Baie de Baly National Park
- Bemaraha National Park
- Isalo National Park
- Kirindy Mitea National Park
- Lokobe National Park
- Mantadia National Park
- Marojejy National Park
- Masoala National Park
- Midongy du sud National Park
- Namoroka National Park
- Ranomafana National Park
- Tsimanampetsotse National Park
- Sahamalaza National Park
- Zahamena National Park
- Zombitse-Vohibasia National Park

== Malawi ==
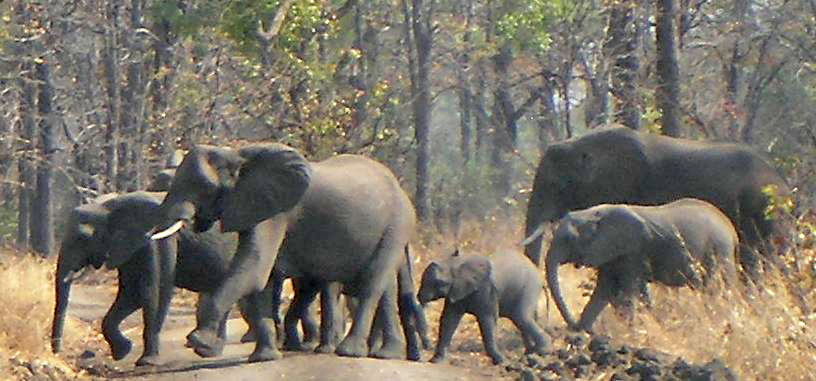
Elephants in Liwonde

- Kasungu National Park
- Lake Malawi National Park
- Lengwe National Park
- Liwonde National Park
- Nyika National Park

== Mali ==
- Bafing National Park
- Boucle du Baoulé National Park
- Kouroufing National Park
- Wongo National Park

== Mauritania ==
- Banc d'Arguin National Park
- Diawling National Park

== Mauritius ==
- Black River Gorges National Park
- Bras d'Eau National Park
- Islets National Park

== Morocco ==
- Al Hoceima National Park
- Gulf of Khnifiss National Park
- Haut Atlas Oriental National Park
- Ifrane National Park
- Iriqui National Park
- Khenifra National Park
- Merdja Zerga Biological Reserve
- Souss-Massa National Park
- Talassemtane National Park
- Tazekka National Park
- Toubkal National Park

== Mozambique ==
- Banhine National Park
- Bazaruto National Park
- Gorongosa National Park
- Limpopo National Park (part of the Great Limpopo Transfrontier Park)
- Magoe National Park
- Quirimbas National Park
- Zinave National Park

== Namibia ==
- Ai-Ais/Richtersveld Transfrontier Park (see also Fish River Canyon and Ai-Ais Hot Springs)
- Bwabwata National Park
- Dorob National Park
- Etosha National Park
- Hardap Recreation Resort
- Mangetti National Park
- Mudumu National Park
- Nkasa Rupara National Park previously Mamili National Park
- Namib-Naukluft National Park
- Skeleton Coast National Park
- Waterberg National Park

== Niger ==
- W of the Niger National Park

== Nigeria ==
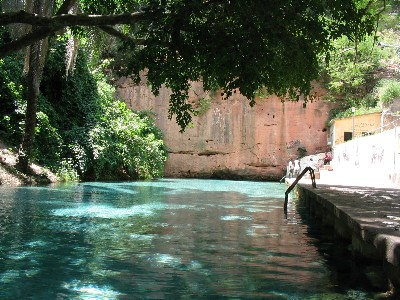
Yankari National Park

- Chad Basin National Park
- Cross River National Park (Okavango and Oban sections)
- Gashaka-Gumti National Park
- Kainji National Park (Borgu and Zugurma sections)
- Kamuku National Park
- Okomu National Park
- Old Oyo National Park
- Yankari National Park

== Rwanda ==
- Akagera National Park
- Gishwati-Mukura National Park
- Nyungwe Forest National Park
- Volcans National Park

== São Tomé and Príncipe ==
- Obo National Park

== Senegal ==
- Basse Casamance National Park
- Isles des Madeleines National Park
- Langue de Barbarie National Park
- Djoudj National Bird Sanctuary
- Niokolo-Koba National Park
- Saloum Delta National Park

== Seychelles ==
- Curieuse Marine National Park
- Morne Seychellois National Park
- Praslin National Park
- Ste. Anne Marine National Park

== Sierra Leone ==
- Gola Rainforest National Park
- Outamba-Kilimi National Park
- Western Area National Park

== Somalia ==
- Arbawerow National Park
- Baraako Madow National Park
- Buloburto National Park
- Bushbushle National Park
- Daalo Forest National Park
- Ga'an Libah National Park
- Hobyo National Park
- las'anod National Park
- Ras Hafun National Park
- Shoonto National Park
- Taleh-El Chebet National Park
- Zayla National Park

== South Africa ==
- Addo Elephant National Park
- Agulhas National Park
- Ai-Ais/Richtersveld Transfrontier Park
- Augrabies Falls National Park
- Bontebok National Park
- Camdeboo National Park
- Golden Gate Highlands National Park
- Hluhluwe–Imfolozi Park
- Karoo National Park
- Kgalagadi Transfrontier Park
- Knysna National Lake Area
- Kruger National Park
- Mapungubwe National Park
- Marakele National Park
- Mokala National Park
- Mountain Zebra National Park
- Namaqua National Park
- Royal Natal National Park
- Table Mountain National Park
- Tankwa Karoo National Park
- Tsitsikamma National Park
- West Coast National Park
- Wilderness National Park

== South Sudan ==
- Bandingilo National Park
- Boma National Park
- Lantoto National Park
- Loelle National Park
- Nimule National Park
- Shambe National Park
- Southern National Park

== Sudan ==
- Dinder National Park
- Jebel Hassania National Park
- Radom National Park
- Suakin Archipelago National Park

== Tanzania ==
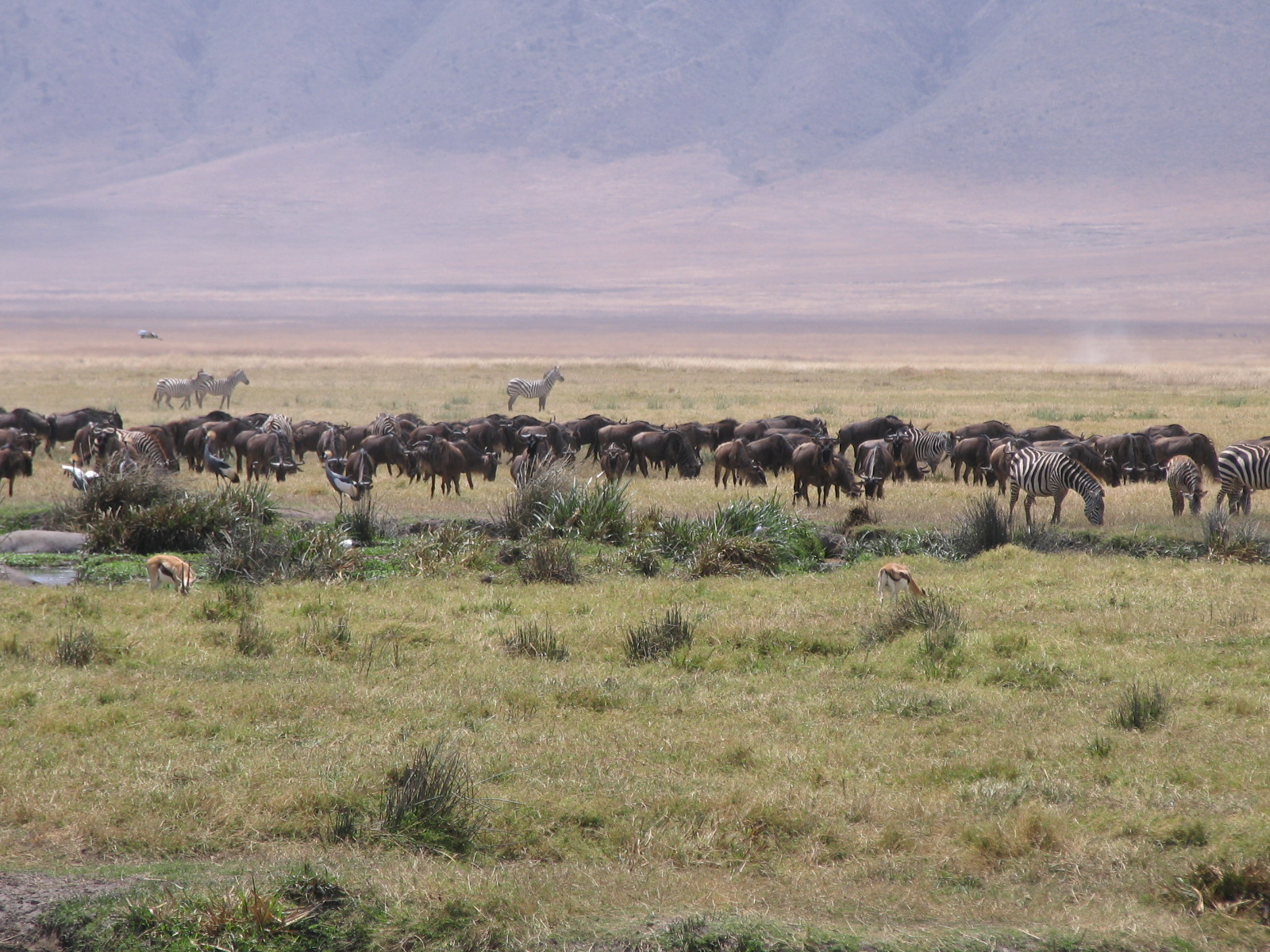
Serengeti National Park

- Arusha National Park
- Burigi-Chato National Park
- Gombe Stream National Park
- Ibanda-Kyerwa National Park
- Katavi National Park
- Kigosi National Park
- Kilimanjaro National Park
- Kitulo National Park
- Lake Manyara National Park
- Mahale Mountains National Park
- Mikumi National Park
- Mkomazi National Park
- Nyerere National Park
- Ruaha National Park
- Rubondo Island National Park
- Rumanyika-Karagwe National Park
- Saadani National Park
- Saanane Island National Park
- Serengeti National Park
- Tarangire National Park
- Udzungwa Mountains National Park
- Ugalla River National Park

== Togo ==
- Fazao-Malfakassa National Park
- Fosse aux Lions National Park
- Kéran National Park

== Tunisia ==
- Bou-Hedma National Park
- Boukornine National Park
- Chaambi National Park
- El Feidja National Park
- Ichkeul National Park
- Jebil National Park
- Sidi Toui National Park
- Zembra and Zembretta Islands National Park

== Uganda ==
- Bwindi Impenetrable National Park
- Kibale National Park
- Kidepo Valley National Park
- Lake Mburo National Park
- Mgahinga National Park
- Mount Elgon National Park
- Murchison Falls National Park
- Queen Elizabeth National Park
- Rwenzori National Park
- Semuliki National Park

== Zambia ==
- Blue Lagoon National Park
- Isangano National Park
- Kafue National Park
- Kasanka National Park
- Lavushi Manda National Park
- Liuwa Plain National Park
- Lochinvar National Park
- Lower Zambezi National Park
- Luambe National Park
- Lukusuzi National Park
- Lusenga Plain National Park
- Mosi-oa-Tunya National Park
- Mweru Wantipa National Park
- North Luangwa National Park
- Nsumbu National Park
- Nyika National Park, Zambia
- Sioma Ngwezi National Park
- South Luangwa National Park
- West Lunga National Park
- Lusaka National Park

== Zimbabwe ==
- Chimanimani National Park
- Chizarira National Park
- Gonarezhou National Park
- Hwange National Park
- Kazuma Pan National Park
- Mana Pools National Park
- Matobo National Park
- Matusadona National Park
- Nyanga National Park
- Victoria Falls National Park
- Zambezi National Park

== Sortable Table ==
| Park | Country | Area in km² | Established | Visitors per Year | Year of Visitor-Counting |
|---|---|---|---|---|---|
| Ahaggar National Park | Algeria | 450,000.00 | 1987 | | |
| Belezma National Park | Algeria | 262.50 | 1984 | 100,000 | |
| Chrea National Park | Algeria | 260.00 | 1985 | | |
| Djebel Aissa National Park | Algeria | 244.00 | 2003 | | |
| Djurdjura National Park | Algeria | 185.00 | 1983 | 500,000 | |
| El Kala National Park | Algeria | 764.38 | 1993 | 30,000 | |
| Gouraya National Park | Algeria | 20.80 | 1984 | 60,000 | |
| Tassili n'Ajjer National Park | Algeria | 72,000.00 | 1982 | | |
| Taza National Park | Algeria | 3,807.00 | 1923 | | |
| Theniet El Had National Park | Algeria | 36.00 | 1983 | | |
| Tlemcen National Park | Algeria | 82.00 | 1993 | | |
| Bicauri National Park | Angola | 7,900.00 | 1964 | | |
| Cameia National Park | Angola | 1,445.00 | 1938 | | |
| Cangandala National Park | Angola | 600.00 | 1970 | | |
| Iona National Park | Angola | 15,200.00 | 1964 | | |
| Longa-Mavinga National Park | Angola | 46,076.00 | 2011 | | |
| Luengue-Luiana National Park | Angola | 22,610 | 2011 | | |
| Mupa National Park | Angola | 6,600.00 | 1964 | | |
| Quiçama National Park | Angola | 9,960.00 | 1957 | | |
| Pendjari National Park | Benin | 2,755.00 | 1996 | | |
| W of the Niger National Park | Benin | 10,000.00 | 1968 | | |
| Chobe National Park | Botswana | 11,700.00 | 1967 | | |
| Kgalagadi Transfrontier Park | Botswana | 38,000.00 | 1931 | | |
| Makgadikgadi Pans National Park | Botswana | 16,000.00 | | | |
| Nxai Pan National Park | Botswana | 2,578.00 | 1992 | | |
| Arli National Park | Burkina Faso | 760.00 | 1954 | | |
| Deux Balés National Park | Burkina Faso | 810.00 | 1937 | | |
| Kaboré Tambi National Park (formerly Pô National Park) | Burkina Faso | 1555 | 1976 | | |
| W of the Niger National Park | Burkina Faso | 10,000.00 | 1954 | | |
| Kibira National Park | Burundi | 400.00 | | | |
| Risizi National Park | Burundi | 62.00 | | | |
| Ruvubu National Park | Burundi | 508.00 | | | |
| Bénoué National Park | Cameroon | 1,800.00 | 1968 | | |
| Bouba Njida National Park | Cameroon | 2,200.00 | 1980 | | |
| Boumba Bek National Park | Cameroon | 2,382.00 | 2005 | | |
| Campo Ma'an National Park | Cameroon | 26.00 | 2000 | | |
| Faro National Park | Cameroon | 3,300.00 | | | |
| Korup National Park | Cameroon | 1,260.00 | 1986 | | |
| Lobéké National Park | Cameroon | 2,178.00 | 1999 | | |
| Nki National Park | Cameroon | 3,093.00 | 2005 | | |
| Waza National Park | Cameroon | 1,700.00 | 1934 | | |
| Fogo National Park | Cape Verde | 84.00 | | | |
| André Félix National Park | Central African Republic | 1,700.00 | 1960 | | |
| Bamingui-Bangoran National Park | Central AfricanRepublic. | 11,191.00 | 1933 | | |
| Dzanga-Ndoki National Park | Central African Republic | 1,143.00 | 1990 | | |
| Mbaéré Bodingué National Park | Central African Republic. | 866.00 | 2007 | | |
| St Floris National Park | Central African Republic | 17,400.00 | 1979 | | |
| Aouk National Park | Chad | 7,400.00 | | | |
| Goz Beïda National Park | Chad | 3,000.00 | | | |
| Manda National Park | Chad | 1,140.00 | 1969 | | |
| Zakouma National Park | Chad | 3,000.00 | 1963 | | |
| Coelacanth National Park | Comoros | 92.76 | 2010 | | |
| Karthala National Park | Comoros | 262.14 | 2010 | | |
| Mitsamiouli Ndroude National Park | Comoros | 23.14 | 2010 | | |
| Mohéli National Park | Comoros | 643.62 | 2010 | | |
| Mount Ntringui National Park | Comoros | 79.14 | 2010 | | |
| Shisiwani National Park | Comoros | 64.97 | 2010 | | |
| Garamba National Park | Democratic Republic of the Congo | 5,200.00 | 1938 | | |
| Kahuzi-Biéga National Park | Democratic Republic of the Congo | 6,000.00 | 1970 | | |
| Kundelungu National Park | Democratic Republic of the Congo | 7,600.00 | 1970 | | |
| Lomami National Park | Democratic Republic of the Congo | 8,879.00 | 2016 | | |
| Maiko National Park | Democratic Republic of the Congo | 10,885.00 | 1970 | | |
| Mangroves National Park | Democratic Republic of the Congo | 768.00 | 1992 | | |
| Okapi Wildlife Reserve (Note: This is not a national park | Democratic Republic of the Congo | 13,726.00 | 1992 | | |
| Salonga National Park (North and South sections) | Democratic Republic of the Congo | 36,000.00 | 1970 | | |
| Upemba National Park | Democratic Republic of the Congo | 11,730.00 | 1939 | | |
| Virunga National Park | Democratic Republic of the Congo | 7,768.00 | 1925 | | |
| Conkouati-Douli National Park | Republic of the Congo | 5,049.00 | 1993 | | |
| Nouabalé-Ndoki National Park | Republic of the Congo | 3,921.00 | 1993 | | |
| Ntokou-Pikounda National Park | Republic of the Congo | 4,572.00 | 2012 | | |
| Odzala-Kokoua National Park | Republic of the Congo | 13,500.00 | 1935 | | |
| Ougoue Lekiti National Park | Republic of the Congo | 3,500.00 | 2018 | | |
| Assagny National Park | Côte d'Ivoire | 19,400.00 | 1981 | | |
| Banco National Park | Côte d'Ivoire | 30.00 | | | |
| Comoé National Park | Côte d'Ivoire | 11,500.00 | 1983 | | |
| Îles Ehotilés National Park | Côte d'Ivoire | 105.00 | 1974 | | |
| Marahoué National Park | Côte d'Ivoire | 1,000.00 | 1968 | | |
| Mont Nimba National Park | Côte d'Ivoire | 17,540.00 | 1944 | | |
| Mont Péko National Park | Côte d'Ivoire | | | | |
| Mont Sângbé National Park | Côte d'Ivoire | 950.00 | 1976 | | |
| Taï National Park | Côte d'Ivoire | 3,300.00 | 1972 | | |
| Day Forest National Park | Djibouti | 15.00 | 1939 | | |
| Djibouti National Park | Djibouti | | | | |
| Yoboki National Park | Djibouti | | | | |
| Gabal Elba National Park | Egypt | 35,600.00 | 1986 | | |
| Lake Burullus Protectorate | Egypt | 46,200.00 | | | |
| Lake Qarun Protectorate | Egypt | | | | |
| Nabq Protected Area | Egypt | 600.00 | 1992 | | |
| Ras Muhammad National Park | Egypt | 480.00 | 1983 | | |
| Saint Katherine Protectorate | Egypt | 640.00 | 2002 | | |
| Sannur Valley Cave Protectorate | Egypt | | 1992 | | |
| Siwa Oasis | Egypt | | | | |
| Taba Protected Area | Egypt | | | | |
| Wadi Allaqi Biosphere Reserve | Egypt | | | | |
| Wadi El Gamal National Park | Egypt | 4,770.00 | 2003 | | |
| Wadi El Rayan Protectorate | Egypt | 1,757.00 | | | |
| White Desert National Park | Egypt | | 2002 | | |
| Gilf Kebir National Park | Egypt | 48,533.00 | 2007 | | |
| Monte Alen Park | Equatorial Guinea | 2,000.00 | 1990 | | |
| Dahlak Marine National Park | Eritrea | | | | |
| Semenawi Bahri National Park | Eritrea | | | | |
| Abidjatta-Shalla National Park | Ethiopia | 887.00 | 1974 | | |
| Awash National Park | Ethiopia | 850.00 | 1966 | | |
| Bale Mountains National Park | Ethiopia | 2,220.00 | 1970 | | |
| Gambela National Park | Ethiopia | 4,575.00 | 1974 | | |
| Mago National Park | Ethiopia | 2,220.00 | 1970 | | |
| Nechisar National Park | Ethiopia | 514.00 | 1974 | | |
| Omo National Park | Ethiopia | 4,068.00 | 1980 | | |
| Simien Mountains National Park | Ethiopia | 220.00 | 1969 | 26,000 | 2016 |
| Yangudi Rassa National Park | Ethiopia | 4,730.00 | 1977 | | |
| Akanda National Park | Gabon | 540.00 | 2002 | | |
| Batéké Plateau National Park | Gabon | 2,034.00 | 2002 | | |
| Birougou National Park | Gabon | 690.00 | 2002 | | |
| Crystal Mountains National Park | Gabon | 1,200.00 | 2002 | | |
| Ivindo National Park | Gabon | 3,000.00 | 2002 | | |
| Loango National Park | Gabon | 1,550.00 | 2002 | | |
| Lopé National Park | Gabon | 4,910.00 | 2002 | | |
| Mayumba National Park | Gabon | 870.00 | 2002 | | |
| Minkébé National Park | Gabon | 7,570.00 | 2002 | | |
| Moukalaba-Doudau National Park | Gabon | 4,500.00 | 1996 | | |
| Mwangné National Park | Gabon | 1,160.00 | | | |
| Pongara National Park | Gabon | 929.00 | | | |
| Waka National Park | Gabon | 1,060.00 | 2002 | | |
| Abuko National Park | The Gambia | 1.00 | 1968 | | |
| Bijilo National Park | The Gambia | 0.50 | 1982 | | |
| Kiang West National Park | The Gambia | 115.00 | 1987 | | |
| Niumi National Park | The Gambia | 49.00 | 1987 | | |
| River Gambia National Park | The Gambia | 5.00 | 1978 | | |
| Bia National Park | Ghana | 563.00 | 1974 | | |
| Bui National Park | Ghana | 1,820.00 | 1971 | | |
| Digya National Park | Ghana | 3,743.00 | 1971 | | |
| Kakum National Park | Ghana | 375.00 | 1992 | | |
| Kalakpa Game Production Reserve | Ghana | 320.00 | 1975 | | |
| Mole National Park | Ghana | 4,840.00 | 1958 | | |
| Nini-Suhien National Park | Ghana | 160.00 | 1976 | | |
| Badiar National Park | Guinea | 1,228.00 | 1985 | | |
| Haut Niger National Park | Guinea | 6,000.00 | 1997 | | |
| Cacheu River National Park | Guinea-Bissau | 886.00 | 2000 | | |
| João Vieira Marine Park | Guinea-Bissau | 495.00 | 2000 | | |
| Orango Islands National Park | Guinea-Bissau | 1,582.00 | 2000 | | |
| Aberdare National Park | Kenya | 767.00 | 1950 | | |
| Amboseli National Park | Kenya | 392.00 | 1974 | 120,000 | 2006 |
| Arabuko Sokoke National Park | Kenya | 6.00 | 1990 | | |
| Central Island National Park | Kenya | 5.00 | 1997 | | |
| Chyulu Hills National Park | Kenya | 741.00 | 1983 | | |
| Hell's Gate National Park | Kenya | 68.00 | 1984 | | |
| Kisite-Mpunguti Marine National Park | Kenya | 39.00 | 1973 | | |
| Lake Nakuru National Park | Kenya | 45.00 | 1990 | | |
| Malindi Marine National Park | Kenya | | | | |
| Malka Mari National Park | Kenya | 1,500.00 | 1989 | | |
| Marsabit National Park | Kenya | 1,554.00 | 1949 | | |
| Meru National Park | Kenya | 870.00 | 1966 | | |
| Mombasa Marine Park | Kenya | 10.00 | 1986 | | |
| Mount Elgon National Park | Kenya | 1,279.00 | 1968 | | |
| Mount Kenya National Park | Kenya | 715.00 | 1949 | | |
| Mount Longonot National Park | Kenya | | | | |
| Nairobi National Park | Kenya | 117.00 | 1946 | | |
| Ol Donyo Sabuk National Park | Kenya | 20.00 | | | |
| Ruma National Park | Kenya | 120.00 | 1983 | | |
| Saiwa Swamp National Park | Kenya | 3.00 | 1974 | | |
| Samburu National Reserve | Kenya | 165.00 | 1985 | | |
| Sibiloi National Park | Kenya | 1,570.00 | 1973 | | |
| Tsavo East National Park | Kenya | 13,747.00 | 1948 | | |
| Tsavo West National Park | Kenya | 9,065.00 | 1948 | | |
| Watamu Marine National Park | Kenya | | 1968 | | |
| Sehlabathebe National Park | Lesotho | 70.00 | 1969 | | |
| Ts'ehlanyane National Park | Lesotho | 1,804.00 | 1983 | | |
| Sapo National Park | Liberia | | | | |
| Gola Forest National Park | Liberia | | | | |
| Kpo Mountains | Liberia | | | | |
| Grand Kru-River Gee | Liberia | | | | |
| Bong Mountain | Liberia | | | | |
| Foya National Park | Liberia | | | | |
| Gbi National Park | Liberia | | | | |
| Nimba West | Liberia | | | | |
| Abughilan National Park | Libya | 40.00 | 1992 | | |
| El-Kouf National Park | Libya | 350.00 | 1975 | 300,000 | |
| Karabolli National Park | Libya | 80.00 | 1992 | | |
| El Naggaza National Park | Libya | 40.00 | 1993 | | |
| Rajma National Park | Libya | | | | |
| Sirman National Park (Surman) | Libya | 4.00 | 1992 | | |
| Amber Mountain National Park | Madagascar | 182.00 | 1958 | | |
| Analamazaotra National Park | Madagascar | | | | |
| Andohahela National Park | Madagascar | 760.00 | 1998 | | |
| Andringitra National Park | Madagascar | 31,160.00 | 1999 | | |
| Ankarafantsika National Park | Madagascar | 1,350.00 | 2002 | | |
| Baie de Baly National Park | Madagascar | 571.00 | 1997 | | |
| Bemaraha National Park | Madagascar | 815.00 | 1962 | | |
| Isalo National Park | Madagascar | | | | |
| Kirindy Mitea National Park | Madagascar | 722.00 | 1997 | | |
| Lokobe National Park | Madagascar | 15.00 | 1927 | | |
| Mantadia National Park | Madagascar | 155.00 | 1989 | 22,110 | 2006 |
| Marojejy National Park | Madagascar | 555.00 | 1998 | | |
| Masoala National Park | Madagascar | 2,400.00 | 1997 | 3,000 | 2005 |
| Midongy du sud National Park | Madagascar | 1,922.00 | 1997 | | |
| Namoroka National Park | Madagascar | 220.00 | 1927 | | |
| Ranomafana National Park | Madagascar | 416.00 | 1991 | | |
| Tsimanampetsotse National Park | Madagascar | 432.00 | 1927 | | |
| Sahamalaza National Park | Madagascar | 260.00 | 2007 | | |
| Zahamena National Park | Madagascar | 423.00 | 1997 | | |
| Zombitse-Vohibasia National Park | Madagascar | 363.00 | 2002 | | |
| Kasungu National Park | Malawi | 2,316.00 | 1970 | | |
| Lake Malawi National Park | Malawi | 94.00 | 1980 | | |
| Lengwe National Park | Malawi | 887.00 | 1970 | | |
| Liwonde National Park | Malawi | 548.00 | 1973 | | |
| Nyika National Park | Malawi | 3,134.00 | 1966 | | |
| Bafing National Park | Mali | 5,000.00 | 2000 | | |
| Boucle du Baoulé National Park | Mali | 25,330.00 | 1982 | | |
| Kouroufing National Park | Mali | 557.00 | 2002 | | |
| Wongo National Park | Mali | 534.00 | 2002 | | |
| Banc d'Arguin National Park | Mauritania | 12,000.00 | 1976 | | |
| Diawling National Park | Mauritania | 15,600.00 | 1994 | | |
| Black River Gorges National Park | Mauritius | 67.00 | 1994 | | |
| Bras d'Eau National Park | Mauritius | 5.00 | 2011 | | |
| Islets National Park | Mauritius | | | | |
| Al Hoceima National Park | Morocco | 470.00 | 2004 | | |
| Gulf of Khnifiss National Park | Morocco | 1,850.00 | 2006 | | |
| Haut Atlas Oriental National Park | Morocco | 490.00 | 2005 | | |
| Ifrane National Park | Morocco | 500.00 | 1980 | | |
| Iriqui National Park | Morocco | 1,230.00 | 1994 | | |
| Khenifra National Park | Morocco | 842.00 | 2008 | | |
| Merdja Zerga Biological Reserve | Morocco | 45.00 | 1980 | | |
| Souss-Massa National Park | Morocco | 338.00 | 1991 | | |
| Talassemtane National Park | Morocco | 589.00 | 2004 | | |
| Tazekka National Park | Morocco | 120.00 | 1950 | | |
| Toubkal National Park | Morocco | 380.00 | 1942 | | |
| Banhine National Park | Mozambique | 7,250.00 | 1973 | | |
| Bazaruto National Park | Mozambique | 1,430.00 | 1971 | | |
| Gorongosa National Park | Mozambique | 3,770.00 | | | |
| Limpopo National Park (part of the Great Limpopo Transfrontier Park) | Mozambique | 10,000.00 | 2004 | | |
| Magoe National Park | Mozambique | 3,500.00 | 2013 | | |
| Quirimbas National Park | Mozambique | 1,430.00 | 1971 | | |
| Zinave National Park | Mozambique | 4,000.00 | 1973 | | |
| Ai-Ais/Richtersveld Transfrontier Park | Namibia | 6,045.00 | 2003 | | |
| Bwabwata National Park | Namibia | 6,274.00 | 2007 | | |
| Dorob National Park | Namibia | 107.00 | 2010 | | |
| Etosha National Park | Namibia | 22,270.00 | 1967 | 200,000 | 2010 |
| Hardap Recreation Resort | Namibia | 252.00 | 1968 | | |
| Mangetti National Park | Namibia | 420.00 | 2008 | | |
| Mudumu National Park | Namibia | 737.00 | 1990 | | |
| Nkasa Rupara National Park | Namibia | 320.00 | 1990 | | |
| Namib-Naukluft National Park | Namibia | 49,768.00 | 1907 | | |
| Skeleton Coast National Park | Namibia | 16,845.00 | 1971 | | |
| Waterberg National Park | Namibia | 405.00 | 1972 | | |
| W of the Niger National Park | Niger | 10,000.00 | 1954 | | |
| Chad Basin National Park | Nigeria | 2,258.00 | | | |
| Cross River National Park | Nigeria | 4,000.00 | 1991 | | |
| Gashaka-Gumti National Park | Nigeria | 6,402.00 | 1991 | | |
| Kainji National Park (Borgu and Zugurma sections) | Nigeria | 5,340.00 | 1978 | | |
| Kamuku National Park | Nigeria | 1,120.00 | 1999 | | |
| Okomu National Park | Nigeria | 200.00 | 1935 | | |
| Old Oyo National Park | Nigeria | 2,512.00 | 1936 | | |
| Yankari National Park | Nigeria | 2,250.00 | 1991 | 20,000 | 2000 |
| Akagera National Park | Rwanda | 1,122.00 | 1934 | | |
| Gishwati Forest | Rwanda | | | | |
| Nyungwe Forest National Park | Rwanda | 970.00 | 2004 | | |
| Volcans National Park | Rwanda | 160.00 | | | |
| Obo National Park | São Tomé and Príncipe | 195.00 | 2006 | | |
| Basse Casamance National Park | Senegal | 50.00 | 1970 | | |
| Isles des Madeleines National Park | Senegal | 0.45 | | | |
| Langue de Barbarie National Park | Senegal | | | | |
| Djoudj National Bird Sanctuary | Senegal | 160.00 | 1971 | | |
| Niokolo-Koba National Park | Senegal | 9,130.00 | 1954 | | |
| Saloum Delta National Park | Senegal | 760.00 | 1984 | | |
| Curieuse Marine National Park | Seychelles | 3.00 | 1979 | | |
| Morne Seychellois National Park | Seychelles | 46.00 | | | |
| Praslin National Park | Seychelles | 7.00 | | | |
| Ste. Anne Marine National Park | Seychelles | 3,887.00 | 1973 | | |
| Gola Rainforest National Park | Sierra Leone | 710.00 | | | |
| Outamba-Kilimi National Park | Sierra Leone | 1,109.00 | 1986 | | |
| Western Area National Park (proposed) | Sierra Leone | 17,688.00 | 1916 | | |
| Daallo Mountain | Somalia | | | | |
| Hargeisa National Park | Somalia | | | | |
| Hobyo grasslands and shrublands | Somalia | 26,200.00 | | | |
| Jilib National Park | Somalia | | | | |
| Kismayo National Park | Somalia | | | | |
| Lag Badana National Park | Somalia | 3,340.00 | | | |
| Addo Elephant National Park | South Africa | 1,640.00 | 1931 | | |
| Agulhas National Park | South Africa | 209.00 | 1998 | | |
| Ai-Ais/Richtersveld Transfrontier Park | South Africa | 6,045.00 | 2003 | | |
| Augrabies Falls National Park | South Africa | 820.00 | 1966 | | |
| Bontebok National Park | South Africa | 28.00 | 1931 | | |
| Camdeboo National Park | South Africa | 194.00 | 2005 | | |
| Golden Gate Highlands National Park | South Africa | 340.00 | 1963 | | |
| Hluhluwe–Imfolozi Park | South Africa | 960.00 | 1895 | | |
| Karoo National Park | South Africa | 767.00 | 1979 | | |
| Kgalagadi Transfrontier Park | South Africa | 38,000.00 | 1931 | | |
| Knysna National Lake Area | South Africa | 1,210.00 | 2009 | | |
| Kruger National Park | South Africa | 19,485.00 | 1926 | 1,659,793 | 2014 |
| Mapungubwe National Park | South Africa | 280.00 | 1995 | | |
| Marakele National Park | South Africa | 670.00 | 1994 | | |
| Mokala National Park | South Africa | 196.00 | 2007 | | |
| Mountain Zebra National Park | South Africa | 284.00 | 1937 | | |
| Namaqua National Park | South Africa | 1,368.00 | 2001 | | |
| Royal Natal National Park | South Africa | 80.94 | | | |
| Table Mountain National Park | South Africa | 221.00 | 1998 | | |
| Tankwa Karoo National Park | South Africa | 1,436.00 | 1986 | | |
| Tsitsikamma National Park | South Africa | | 2009 | | |
| West Coast National Park | South Africa | 362.00 | 1985 | | |
| Wilderness National Park | South Africa | 1,210.00 | 2009 | | |
| Bandingilo National Park | South Sudan | 10,000.00 | 1992 | | |
| Boma National Park | South Sudan | 22,800.00 | 1977 | | |
| Nimule National Park | South Sudan | 410.00 | 1954 | | |
| Southern National Park | South Sudan | 23,000.00 | 1939 | | |
| Dinder National Park | Sudan | 10,000.00 | 1935 | | |
| Lantoto National Park | Sudan | 760.00 | 2003 | | |
| Radom National Park | Sudan | 12,509.00 | 1980 | | |
| Suakin Archipelago National Park | Sudan | 1,500.00 | | | |
| Hlane Royal National Park | Swaziland | 300.00 | | | |
| Arusha National Park | Tanzania | 137.00 | 1960 | 66,808 | 2012 |
| Gombe Stream National Park | Tanzania | 35.00 | 1968 | 1,854 | 2012 |
| Jozani Chwaka Bay National Park | Tanzania | 50.00 | 2004 | | |
| Katavi National Park | Tanzania | 4,471.00 | 1974 | 3,135 | 2012 |
| Kilimanjaro National Park | Tanzania | 1,688.00 | 1973 | 52,000 | |
| Kitulo National Park | Tanzania | 413.00 | 2005 | 409 | 2012 |
| Lake Manyara National Park | Tanzania | 325.00 | 1960 | 178,473 | 2012 |
| Mafia Island Marine Park | Tanzania | 822.00 | 1995 | | |
| Mahale Mountains National Park | Tanzania | 1,650.00 | | 1,074 | 2012 |
| Maziwi Island Marine Reserve | Tanzania | | 1975 | | |
| Mikumi National Park | Tanzania | 3,230.00 | 1964 | 41,666 | 2012 |
| Mnazi Bay-Ruvumba Estuary Marine Park | Tanzania | 650.00 | 2000 | | |
| Ruaha National Park | Tanzania | 20,226.00 | 1964 | 21,267 | 2012 |
| Rubondo Island National Park | Tanzania | 456.00 | 1965 | 748 | 2012 |
| Saadani National Park | Tanzania | 1,100.00 | 2005 | 15,415 | 2012 |
| Serengeti National Park | Tanzania | 14,750.00 | 1951 | 350,000 | |
| Tarangire National Park | Tanzania | 2,850.00 | 1970 | 161,792 | 2012 |
| Udzungwa Mountains National Park | Tanzania | 1,990.00 | | 7,749 | 2012 |
| Fazao-Malfakassa National Park | Togo | 1,920.00 | 1975 | | |
| Fosse aux Lions National Park | Togo | 16.50 | 1954 | | |
| Kéran National Park | Togo | 690.00 | 1950 | | |
| Bou-Hedma National Park | Tunisia | | 1980 | | |
| Boukornine National Park | Tunisia | 19.00 | 1987 | | |
| Chaambi National Park | Tunisia | 67.00 | 1980 | | |
| El Feidja National Park | Tunisia | 27.00 | 1990 | | |
| Ichkeul National Park | Tunisia | 126.00 | 1980 | | |
| Jebil National Park | Tunisia | 1,500.00 | 1994 | | |
| Sidi Toui National Park | Tunisia | | 1993 | | |
| Zembra and Zembretta Islands National Park | Tunisia | | | | |
| Bwindi Impenetrable National Park | Uganda | 331.00 | 1991 | 20,000 | 2019 |
| Kibale National Park | Uganda | 776.00 | 1993 | | |
| Kidepo Valley National Park | Uganda | 1,442.00 | 1958 | | |
| Lake Mburo National Park | Uganda | 260.00 | 1983 | | |
| Mgahinga National Park | Uganda | 33.00 | 1991 | | |
| Mount Elgon National Park | Uganda | 1,279.00 | 1992 | | |
| Murchison Falls National Park | Uganda | 3,893.00 | 1952 | | |
| Queen Elizabeth National Park | Uganda | 1,978.00 | 1952 | | |
| Rwenzori National Park | Uganda | 998.00 | 1991 | | |
| Semuliki National Park | Uganda | 220.00 | 1993 | | |
| Blue Lagoon National Park | Zambia | 500.00 | 1976 | | |
| Isangano National Park | Zambia | 840.00 | 1972 | | |
| Kafue National Park | Zambia | 22,400.00 | 1950 | | |
| Kasanka National Park | Zambia | 390.00 | | | |
| Lavushi Manda National Park | Zambia | 1,500.00 | 1972 | | |
| Liuwa Plain National Park | Zambia | 1,390.00 | 1972 | | |
| Lochinvar National Park | Zambia | 428.00 | 1972 | | |
| Lower Zambezi National Park | Zambia | 4,092.00 | 1983 | | |
| Luambe National Park | Zambia | 300.00 | | | |
| Lukusuzi National Park | Zambia | | | | |
| Lusenga Plain National Park | Zambia | 800.00 | 1972 | | |
| Mosi-oa-Tunya National Park | Zambia | 23.00 | | | |
| Mweru Wantipa National Park | Zambia | | | | |
| North Luangwa National Park | Zambia | 4,636.00 | 1972 | | |
| Nsumbu National Park | Zambia | 2,000.00 | | | |
| Nyika National Park, Zambia | Zambia | | | | |
| Sioma Ngwezi National Park | Zambia | 5,000.00 | | | |
| South Luangwa National Park | Zambia | 9,050.00 | 1972 | | |
| West Lunga National Park | Zambia | 1,700.00 | | | |
| Lusaka National Park | Zambia | 67.00 | 2011 | | |
| Chimanimani National Park | Zimbabwe | | | | |
| Chizarira National Park | Zimbabwe | 2,000.00 | 1975 | | |
| Gonarezhou National Park | Zimbabwe | 5,053.00 | 1975 | | |
| Hwange National Park | Zimbabwe | 14,651.00 | 1961 | 43,000 | |
| Kazuma Pan National Park | Zimbabwe | 313.00 | 1949 | | |
| Mana Pools National Park | Zimbabwe | 2,196.00 | 1984 | | |
| Matobo National Park | Zimbabwe | 424.00 | 1926 | | |
| Matusadona National Park | Zimbabwe | 1,400.00 | 1975 | | |
| Nyanga National Park | Zimbabwe | 472.00 | 1926 | | |
| Victoria Falls National Park | Zimbabwe | 23.00 | 2013 | | |
| Zambezi National Park | Zimbabwe | 560.00 | 1979 | | |
