= Tourism in Somalia =

Tourism in Somalia is regulated by the Federal Government of Somalia's Ministry of Tourism. The industry was traditionally noted for its numerous historical sites, beaches, waterfalls, mountain ranges and national parks. After the start of the civil war in the early 1990s, the Tourism Ministry shut down operations. It was re-established in the 2000s, and once again oversees the national tourist industry. The Mogadishu-based Somali Tourism Association (SOMTA) provides on-the-ground consulting services. In 2024, the number of foreign visitors to Somalia has increased by 50% in the past year, reaching over 10,000.

== History ==
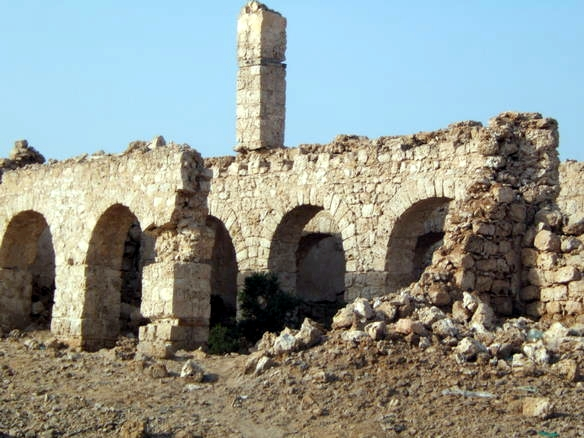
Ruins of the Adal Sultanate in Zeila

In the pre-independence period, European explorers would occasionally travel to Somalia and other parts of the Horn of Africa to visit the region's numerous historical sites described in old documents like the 1st century CE Periplus of the Erythraean Sea.

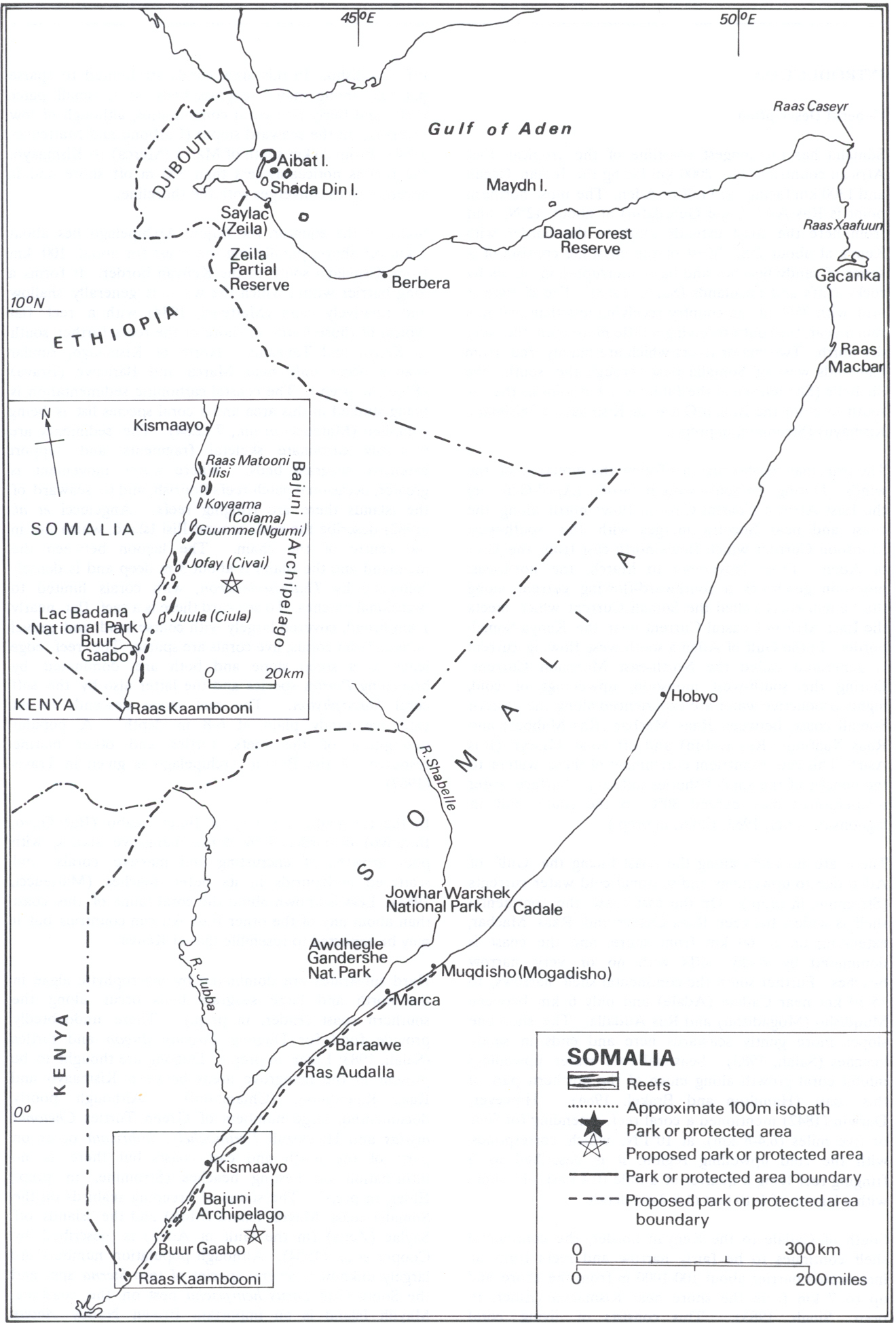
Somalia's ecological parks, coral reefs and protected areas

Following Somalia's independence in 1960, the Ministry of Tourism was established in order to regulate the national tourist industry. In 1969, the Law on Fauna (Hunting) and Forest Conservation was passed, which defined and provided for the establishment of controlled areas, game reserves and partial game reserves. It was later amended in 1978.

Under Mire Aware Jama, the Ministry subsequently passed the Tourism Act in 1984. The bill laid down official guidelines for the development and modernization of the tourism sector. Among its stated aims was the acquisition of land in the interior and on the coast as well as beach properties for the purpose of building or expanding tourist infrastructures. The Act also included provisions for "the protection, preservation and utilization of historic, cultural and artisanal resources; the protection and preservation of ecology and environment; and strict urban and regional planning for zones of touristic interest to include game parks, land and sea parks, sanctuaries, etc." The Tourism Ministry sought to center the industry in the vicinity of the southern Lag Badana National Park, with nearby coral reefs and offshore islands likewise envisioned as part of the development. Additionally, plans were drawn up for the formation of a tourist resort area on one of the beaches near the capital Mogadishu, in the south-central Banaadir region.

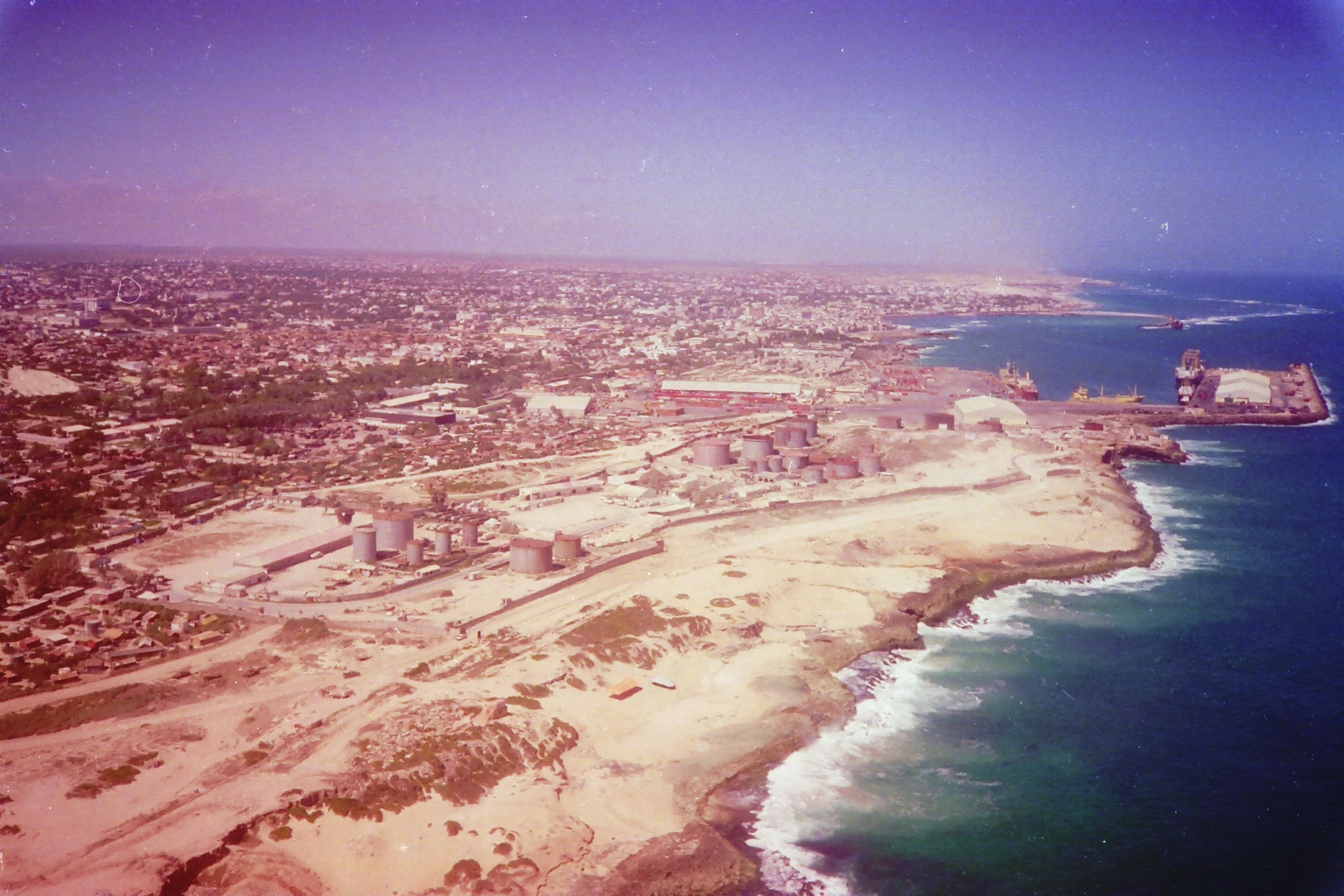
The historic Mogadishu waterfront (1984)

By 1989, newer legislation was drafted governing the establishment of national parks, game reserves and special reserves. The conservation of wildlife resources was at this time overseen by the Ministry of Livestock, Forestry and Range's National Range Agency. Its Department of Wildlife also operated an independent law-enforcement unit, which had been created through a presidential decree.

Following the outbreak of the civil war in 1991, tourism in Somalia came to a halt. Various international bodies subsequently began issuing travel advisories recommending that potential tourists avoid visiting the area for safety reasons. Aside from a handful of adventure seekers, few travelers ventured to the volatile southern provinces. Most instead limited their visits to the relatively stable northern Somaliland territory.

After the Somali Armed Forces evicted Al-Shabaab militants from Mogadishu in mid-2011, the capital gradually started to experience a renaissance. Local businessmen and returning Somali expatriates built and opened a number of new hotels and guest houses, mainly catering to other Somalis as well as some Westerners. Newly constructed beachside resorts also accommodated the first tourist families in many years.

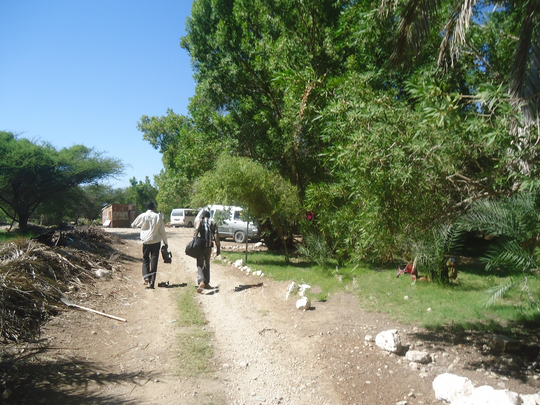
Biyo kulule, a tourist place near Bosaso Bari region, Puntland, Somalia

== Regulation ==
Tourism in Somalia is regulated by the reconstituted national Ministry of Tourism. The self declared republic of Somaliland maintain their own tourist offices. Somali Tourism Association (SOMTA) also provides consulting services from within the country on the national tourist industry.

Due to the long absence of governmental regulation, it is uncertain how many international inbound tourists visit Somalia per year. However, visas and stay permits are now mandatory for all foreign nationals. As of April 2013, the re-established Somali Immigration Department requires all undocumented foreigners to register at its offices in the capital.

== Attractions ==
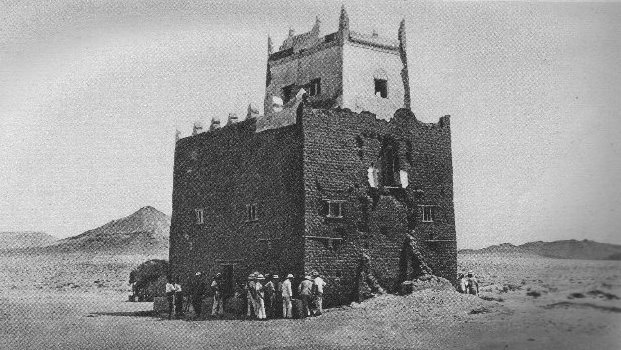
One of the forts of the Majeerteen Sultanate (Migiurtinia) in Hafun

Somalia has a number of local attractions, including historical sites, beaches, waterfalls, mountain ranges and national parks. As of March 2015, the Ministry of Tourism and Wildlife of the South West State announced that it is slated to establish additional game reserves and wildlife ranges.

=== Historical sites ===
North

- Aluula – Former capital of the Majeerteen Sultanate (Migiurtinia).
- Bargal – Former seasonal capital of the Majeerteen Sultanate. Features the ruins of one of the castles of King Osman Mahamuud.
- Bosaso-The Periplus of the Erythraean Sea indicates that ancient Greek merchants sailed to Bosaso, providing notes about the strategic and geographical location of the current Bosaso area, which was known as Mosylon in ancient times. The towns environs such as Biyo Kulule and Bacaad as well as Karin which Italians had second largest base in Somali soil all are artifacts sites
- Damo – The likely "Market and Cape of Spices" described in the Periplus of the Erythraean Sea.
- Dhambalin – Archaeological site in northern Somalia, with rock art in the Ethiopian-Arabian style showing early evidence of animal domestication.
- Eyl – Site of many historical artefacts and structures. Served as a base for the Dervish forces, with several Dhulbahante garesas remaining from this period. Also includes some colonial edifices built by the Italians.

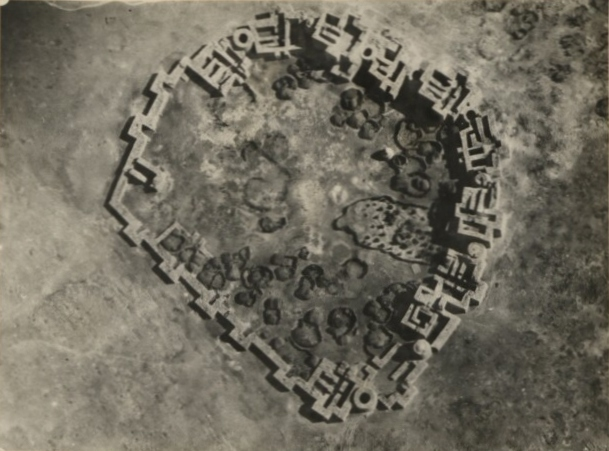
Aerial view of the Dervish State's main Dhulbahante Garesa complex in Taleh

- Hafun – Site of an ancient necropolis.
- Haylaan – Site of numerous ancient ruins and buildings. Includes the tombs of Sheikh Darod and his wife Dobira.
- Laas Gaal – Complex of caves in northwestern Somalia containing some of the earliest known rock art in the region. Its cave paintings have been estimated to date back between 9,000-3,000 BCE.
- Las Khorey – Former capital of the Warsangali Sultanate. Is the seat of the Sultan's former two-storey palace, a fortress, and a number of other historic ruins.
- Maydh – Site of an ancient port city in the Sanaag region of Somalia. Includes the tomb of Sheikh Isaaq.
- Qa’ableh – Old town with a number of ancient burial structures. Believed to harbor the tombs of former kings from early periods of Somali history. Includes the tomb of Sheikh Harti.
- Qombo'ul – Historic town in the Sanaag region. Sites include ancient ruins, buildings and structures.
- Taleh – Former capital of the Dervish State. Features the largest Dhulbahante garesa complex.
- Zeila – The commercial port of Avalites in antiquity, and the first capital of the medieval Adal Sultanate.

South

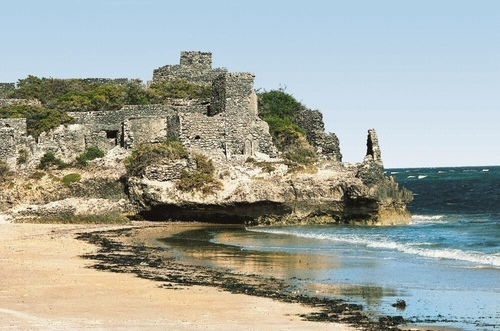
The Citadel of Gondershe

- Afgooye – Former capital of the Geledi Sultanate.
- Barawa – An important medieval trading city.
- Gondal – An historic settlement in southern Somalia. The site of ancient ruins, it is considered a predecessor of Kismayo.
- Gondershe – Medieval stone city built on an oasis featuring coral stone houses, fortifications, tombs and mosques. Location of the film La Conchiglia (1992) shot by the award-winning Somali director Abdulkadir Ahmed Said.
- Hannassa – Historic town built on a promontory. Features pillar tombs, old houses with archways and courtyards, and a mosque with a well-preserved mihrab overlooking the Indian Ocean.
- Hobyo – Former capital of the Sultanate of Hobyo.
- Kismayo – Site of ruins of the Geledi Sultanate and other kingdoms.
- Luuq – A town in the southwestern Gedo province of Somalia. It is one of the older settlements in the area.
- Merca – An ancient port city in the southern Lower Shebelle (Shabellaha Hoose) region of Somalia.
- Mogadishu – Former capital of the Sultanate of Mogadishu. Likely coextensive with the ancient port of Sarapion, as described by Ptolemy.
- Nimmo – An historical town located south of Mogadishu, it consists of ruined stone houses and mosques.
- Warsheikh – One of the principal settlements of the Sultanate of Mogadishu during the Middle Ages.

=== Beaches ===
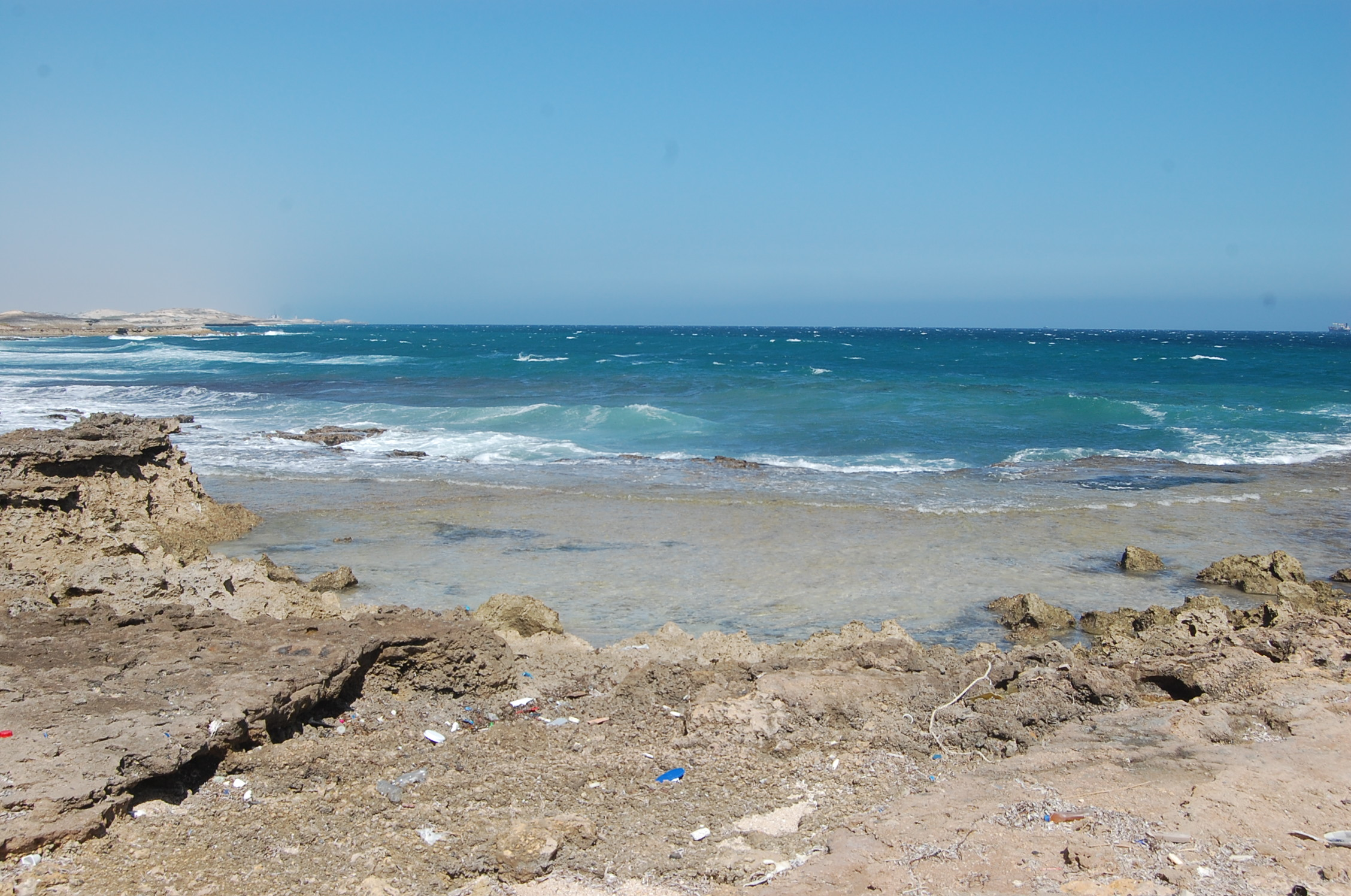
Beach in Mogadishu

- Gezira Beach – Mogadishu
- Bosaso - Bosaso
- Baathela – Berbera
- Batalaale – Berbera
- Lido – Mogadishu

=== Waterfalls ===
- Iskushuban
- Lamadaya

=== Mountain ranges ===
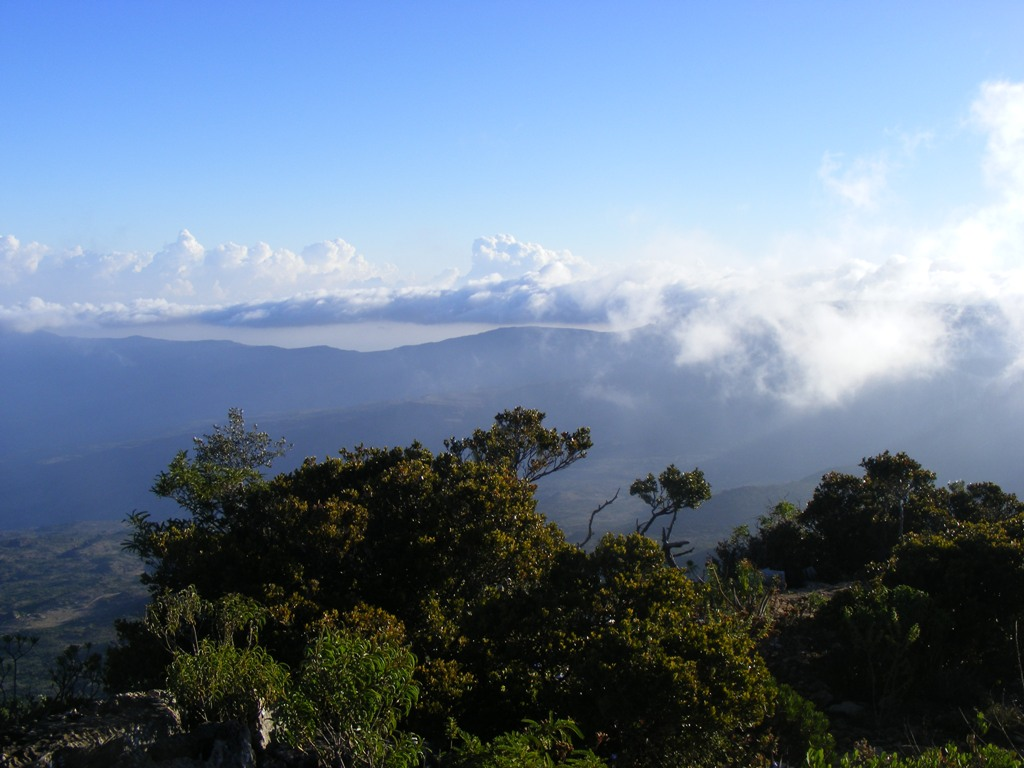
The Cal Madow mountain range

- Cal Madow
- Golis Mountains
- Ogo Mountains

=== National parks ===
- Daallo Mountain
- Hargeisa National Park
- Hobyo grasslands and shrublands
- Jilib National Park
- Kismayo National Park
- Lag Badana National Park

== See also ==
- Somalian architecture
- Somali passport
- Transport in Somalia
- Maritime history of Somalia
- Visa policy of Somalia
