= Tourism in Somaliland =

Tourism in Somaliland is regulated by Somaliland's Ministry of Tourism.

== Background ==
The history of tourism in Somaliland is linked to that of Somalia. The tourism industry declined rapidly during the Somali Civil War. Since the declaration of Somaliland's independence and the establishment of a de facto legal government, stability has returned to everywhere but the easternmost part of the country. Somaliland's tourist attractions include archaeological and historical sites, and natural geographic features. Famous examples are Hargeisa, Zeila, the beaches of Berbera or the Cal Madow mountains. Being a country that doesn't legally exist and is still technically in civil war a part of Somalia, makes it attractive for proponents of "dark tourism". Some may travel to Somaliland to claim that they've been to Somalia, albeit without much of the danger found there.

== Access ==
While Somaliland is open for most international tourists, the region remains challenging to reach for many travelers. Most visitors to Somaliland enter through Djibouti or Ethiopia, as entering via sea or Somalia is not considered viable due to the Somali Civil War/Puntland-Somaliland Conflict.

In 2024, the United Kingdom's foreign office advised against all but necessary travel to the region, with a "no travel" advisory for British citizens. Other countries that advise against all but essential travel to the region include Canada, the United States, and Ireland. Citizens of Egypt were asked to leave the territory by their government in 2024 due to rising tensions in the region.

== Historical sites ==
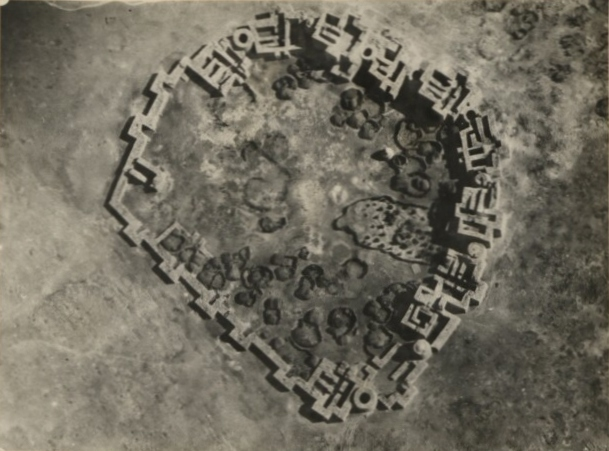
Aerial view of the Dervish State's main fort complex in Taleh.

- Dhambalin – Archaeological site in Sahil region, with rock art in the Ethiopian-Arabian style showing early evidence of animal domestication.
- Haylaan – Site of numerous ancient ruins and buildings. Includes the tombs of Sheikh Darod and his wife Dobira.
- Laas Gaal – Complex of caves in northwestern Somaliland containing some of the earliest known rock art in the region. Its cave paintings have been estimated to date back between 9,000 and 3,000 BCE.
- Maydh – Site of an ancient port city in the Sanaag region of Somaliland. Includes the tomb of Sheikh Isaaq.
- Qa’ableh – Old town with a number of ancient burial structures. Believed to harbor the tombs of former kings from early periods of Somali history. Includes the tomb of Sheikh Harti.
- Qombo'ul – Historic town in the Sanaag region. Sites include ancient ruins, buildings and structures.
- Taleh – Former capital of the Dervish State. Features a large fortress complex.
- Zeila – The commercial port of Avalites in antiquity, and the first capital of the medieval Adal Sultanate.

=== Beaches ===
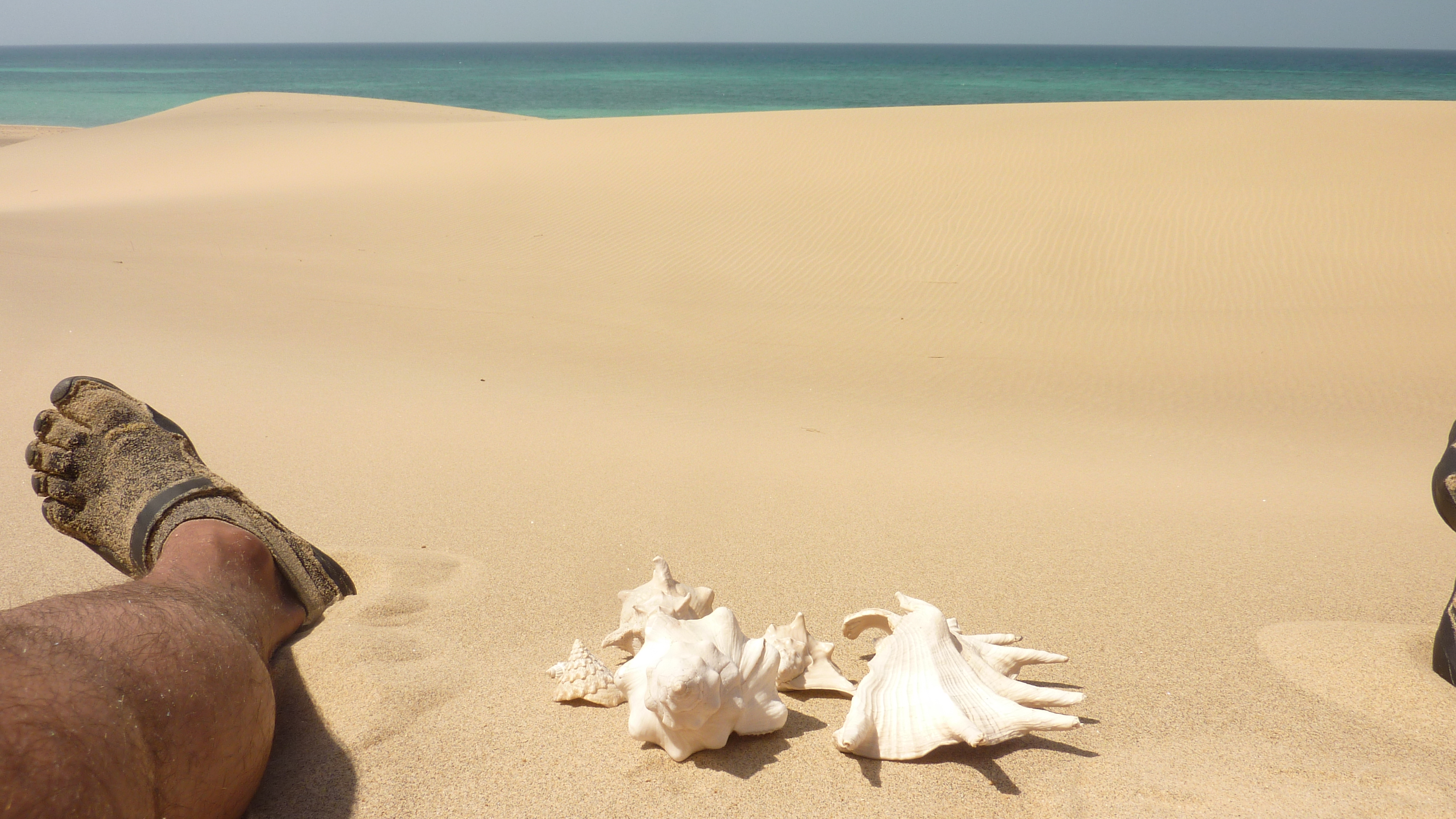
Beach in Berbera.

- Baathela – Berbera

=== Waterfalls ===
- Lamadaya

=== Mountain ranges ===
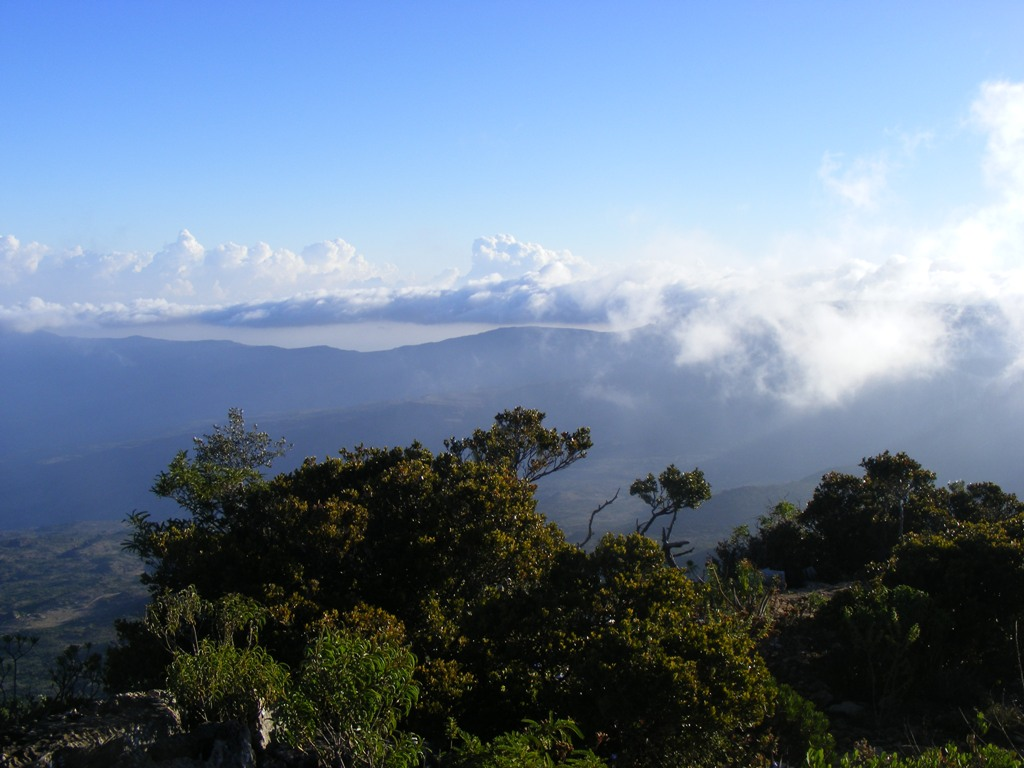
The Cal Madow mountain range.

- Cal Madow
- Golis Mountains
- Ogo Mountains

=== National parks ===
- Daallo Mountain
- Hargeisa National Park

== See also ==
- Somalian architecture
- Somaliland passport
- Transport in Somalia
- Maritime history of Somalia
- Visa policy of Somaliland
