= Somali montane xeric woodlands =

Desert and xeric scrubland ecoregion in Somalia

Somali montane xeric shrublands
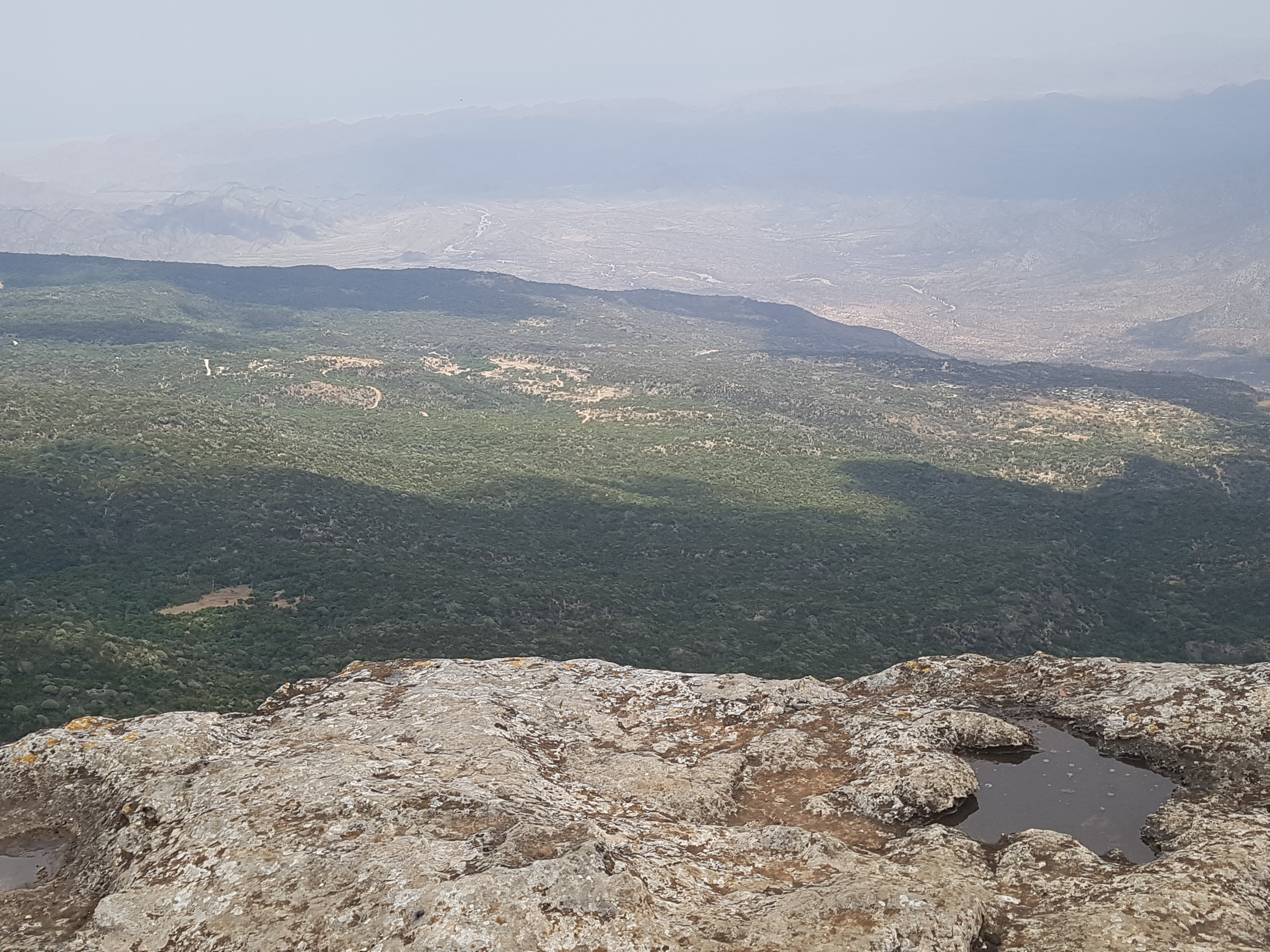
- Daallo Mountain

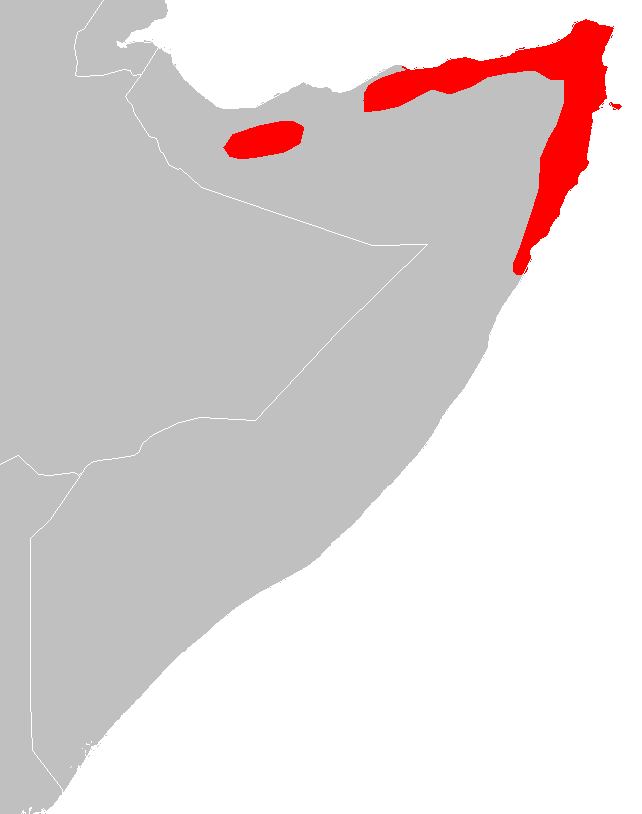
- Map of Somali montane xeric shrublands

Ecology
- Realm: Afrotropical
- Biome: deserts and xeric shrublands
- Borders: Ethiopian xeric grasslands and shrublands; Somali Acacia–Commiphora bushlands and thickets

Geography
- Area: 62,200 km^{2} (24,000 mi^{2})
- Country: Somalia

Conservation
- Conservation status: critical/endangered

The Somali montane xeric shrublands is a desert and xeric scrubland ecoregion in Somliland and Somalia. The ecoregion lies in the rugged Karkaar Mountains, which run parallel and close to Somalia and Somaliland's northern coast on the Gulf of Aden, and follows coast from Cape Guardafui south to Eyl on the Arabian Sea .

== Geography ==
The ecoregion covers the Karkaar Mountains, which extend east and west parallel to Somalia and Somaliland's northern coast, from central Togdheer eastwards to Cape Guardafui at Somalia's northeastern tip. A narrow coastal strip separates the mountains from the Gulf of Aden to the north. The Ga'an Libah and Golis Mountains in central Somaliland form the western portion of the ecoregion. Further east are the Cal Madow mountains of eastern Sanaag and northern Bari. The ecoregion extends to sea level in the north and east, and up to 2,416 m at the summit Mount Shimbiris, the highest peak in the ecoregion and in Sanaag. The higher mountains include outcrops of limestone and gypsum.

== Climate ==
The climate is tropical and arid to semi-arid. Mean temperatures vary seasonally, and range from 21°C to 30°C in the lowlands to 9°C to 21°C in the mountains. Most rainfall occurs during the winter months. Average annual rainfall is less than 200 mm in the lowlands. Some mountain areas receive more orographic precipitation, with the escarpment near Maydh receiving 700 mm of rainfall annually.

== Flora ==
The vegetation of the ecoregion varies with elevation, rainfall, and soils.

The hot and dry coastal plains have little or no vegetation. Open scrubland is found in the foothills, where woody species of Acacia, Commiphora, and Boswellia are predominant.

Evergreen and semi-evergreen shrubland is found on the slopes of the escarpment, composed of evergreen and semi-evergreen shrubs and small trees. Characteristic plants include Dracaena schizantha, Barbeya oleoides, Mimusops laurifolia, Cadia purpurea, Buxus hildebrandtii, and Pistacia aethiopica. Typical plant associations include dry Juniperus-Olea forest of Juniperus procera and Olea europaea, dry Juniperus-Olea-Barbeya forests with Barbeya oleoides, and Buxus-Acokanthera scrub with Buxus hildebrandtii and Acokanthera schimperi. Mimusops laurifolia is found in Juniperus-Olea forests, as single large trees in evergreen or semi-evergreen bushland outside the forest, and in riparian forests or as isolated trees along intermittent streams. The endemic shrub Reseda sessilifolia lives on outcrops of gypsum. The endemic tree subspecies Ceratonia oreothauma subsp. somalensis occurs in the mountains between 1500 and 1800 meters elevation. Remnant juniper woodlands and forests are found at the highest elevations.

Other endemic species include the monotypic genus Renschia, four species of Helianthemum, Thamnosma somalensis, Barleria compacta, Wellstedia lacinia, and Wellstedia somalensis. The endemic shrub Boswellia frereana, which grows from near the coast up to 750 meters elevation, produces valuable frankincense resin. The giant succulent plants Aloidendron eminens and Euphorbia abyssinica grow in the escarpment shrublands.

== Fauna ==
Several antelope species are native to the ecoregion, including the beira (Dorcatragus megalotis), Speke's gazelle (Gazella spekei), Salt's dik-dik (Madoqua saltiana), and Soemmerring's gazelle (Gazella soemmerringii). These animals are threatened by over-hunting and grazing competition with livestock. The Somali hedgehog (Atelerix sclateri), Louise's spiny mouse (Acomys louisae), and Somali elephant shrew (Elephantulus revoili) are near-endemic small mammal species whose ranges extend into neighboring ecoregions.

Three species of birds are endemic to the ecoregion, the Somali pigeon (Columba oliviae), Somali thrush (Turdus ludoviciae), and Warsangli linnet (Linaria johannis). The Somali thrush and Warsangli linnet are found mostly or exclusively in high-elevation juniper forests, and both species are severely threatened. The ecoregion corresponds to the North Somali Mountains endemic bird area.

The snakes Spalerosophis josephscorteccii and reticulate blind snake (Leptotyphlops reticulatus) and the lizard Pseuderemias savagei are endemic to the ecoregion.

== Protected areas ==
Protected areas in the ecoregion include Daalo Forest National Park, Ga'an Libah National Park, and Ras Hafun National Park. The boundaries and areas of Somalia's protected areas are not reported, and there has been little formal protection or management of most areas since the collapse of Somalia's central government in 1991.
