= Geography of Somaliland =

- Region: Horn of Africa
- Coordinates: 9.75°N 45.966667°E
- Area: Ranked 90nd
  - Total: 176,120 km^{2} (68,000 sq mi)
- Coastline: 740 km (460 mi)
- Borders: 1,228 km (763 mi): Djibouti: 60 km (37 mi); Ethiopia: 766 km (476 mi); Somalia: 402 km (250 mi); Yemen: (maritime boundary, Gulf of Aden)
- Highest point: Shimbiris; 2,460 m (8,070.9 ft)
- Lowest point: Guban −100 m (−328 ft)
- Climate: Arid, Semi-arid
- Exclusive economic zone: 70,000 km^{2} (27,000 mi^{2})

Somaliland is an unrecognised sovereign state in the Horn of Africa, internationally considered to be part of Somalia. Somaliland is located in the East African sub-continent between the equator and the Gulf of Aden. The country occupies an area of approximately 176,120 square kilometres (68,000 sq mi). The climate is mostly hot and desertlike; it is largely arid with some semi-arid regions.

== Land boundaries ==
Somaliland with bordering countries

To the north of Somaliland is the Gulf of Aden, which borders Somaliland along its only coastline until the maritime boundary with Yemen. In its north-western corner, Somaliland shares a border with Djibouti. Ethiopia borders the country to the west and to the south. Somalia, which claims sovereignty over the territory of Somaliland, lies to the east.

== Topography ==
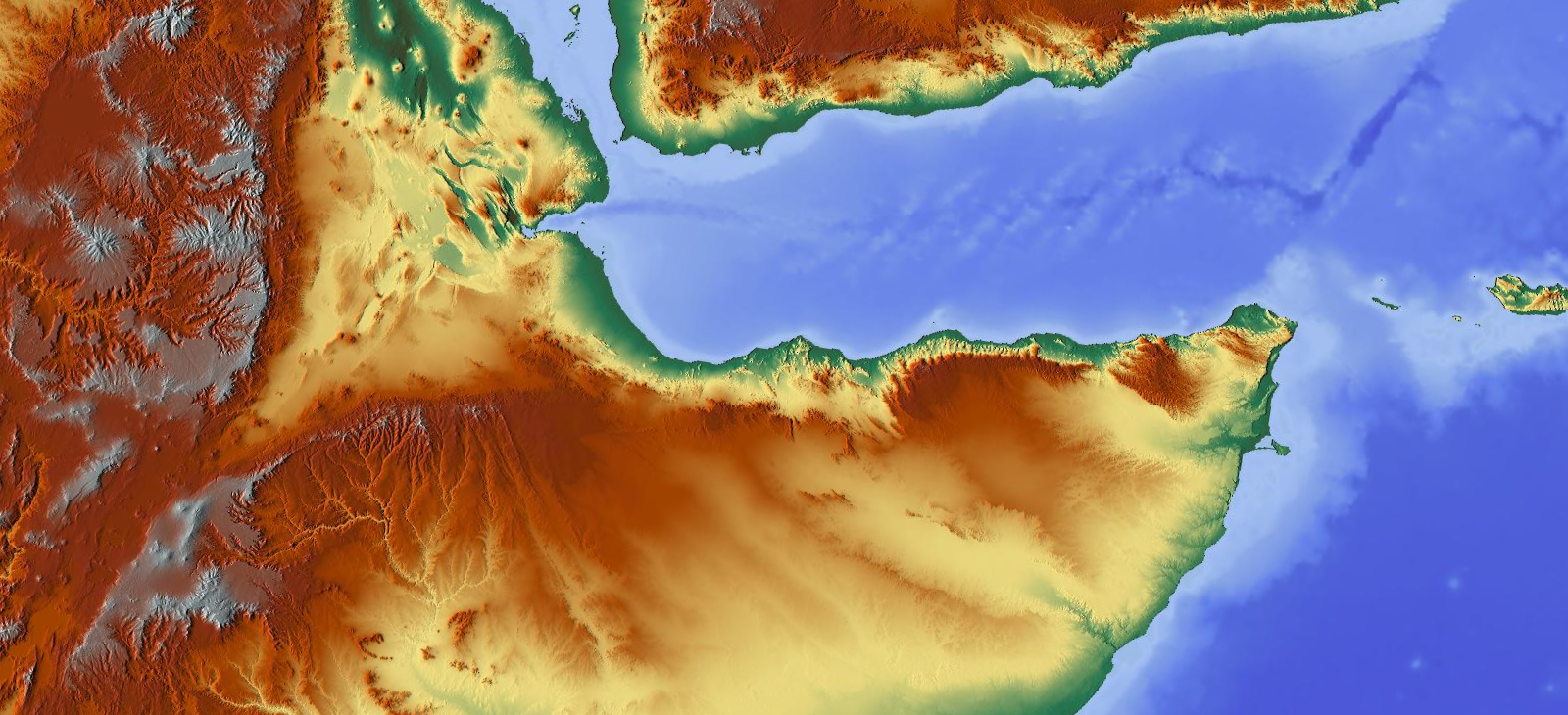
Topographic map of Somaliland

Somaliland is occupied by three main topographic areas. In the north and northwest, along the Gulf of Aden, lie the coastal plains of the Guban region. The plains are a low region that are, on average, just 500 metres above sea level. The low altitude of the region makes it hot and dry, and it receives little rain throughout the year. The Guban contains the port cities of Berbera and Zeylac. The highlands are cool and wet area in the center of Somaliland that contain a series of mountain ranges. To the west are the Golis Mountains and to the east, the Ogo Mountains. The highest peak is found on Mount Shimbiris of the Cal Madow range, with a height of 2,460 metres (8,070 ft). In the east, the Haud is separated from the Ain and Nugal valleys by the Buur Dhaab mountain range.

Borama is one of the major cities located in the mountainous region. In the southeast, near the border with Somalia, is a low region of valleys. The valleys are hot and dry, and receive relatively small amounts of rain each year. The average elevation of the area is between 500 and 1000 metres above sea level. Notable cities in the area include Laascaanood, Taleex, and Xudun.

== Somaliland Regions ==
The area of the regions of Somaliland is set out in the table below.

Rank	Name	Area
1	Awdal Region	16,294 km^{2}
2	Sahil Region	13,930 km^{2}
3	Maroodi Jeh Region	17,429 km^{2}
4	Togdheer Region	30,426 km^{2}
5	Sanaag Region	54,231 km^{2}
6	Sool Region	39,240 km^{2}

== Climate ==
Somaliland map of Köppen climate classification. Semi-arid climate Arid climate

Somaliland lies north of the Equator and has a dry climate, with most regions designated as arid, with a few, smaller, areas as semi-arid. The temperatures in the highlands range from around 20–24 °C (68–75 °F). In the lower regions such as the valleys and coastal plains, the average temperatures are in the higher range of 28–35 °C (82–95 °F).

Most regions in Somaliland experience an average of 14.5 inches (370 mm) per year. The primary rainy season is during the spring, with a secondary, more limited, season in late fall. Most of the annual rainfall is concentrated in the highland and plateaux regions of the country, which both receive an average of 300–600 millimetres (12–24 in) per year.

Somaliland experiences four seasons of climate. Gu (spring) is the longest wet season, and lasts from late March to early June. The increased rain at this time usually corresponds to abundant water and increased breeding of livestock. Xagaa (summer) is a dry windy season, that typically lasts from June through September. Deyr (fall) is the shorter rainy season which covers late September through November. Jiilaal (winter) is the long dry season which lasts from December until mid-March. Jiilaal is the coolest period of the year in Somaliland, but still brings relatively high amounts of humidity.

Climate data for Hargeisa
Month	Jan	Feb	Mar	Apr	May	Jun	Jul	Aug	Sep	Oct	Nov	Dec	Year
Record high °C (°F)	31.1 (88.0)	31.7 (89.1)	32.8 (91.0)	32.8 (91.0)	35.0 (95.0)	33.9 (93.0)	33.9 (93.0)	33.3 (91.9)	32.8 (91.0)	31.7 (89.1)	30.6 (87.1)	28.9 (84.0)	35.0 (95.0)
Mean daily maximum °C (°F)	24.2 (75.6)	26.6 (79.9)	28.7 (83.7)	29.2 (84.6)	30.5 (86.9)	31.0 (87.8)	29.2 (84.6)	29.2 (84.6)	30.5 (86.9)	28.2 (82.8)	26.0 (78.8)	23.7 (74.7)	28.1 (82.6)
Daily mean °C (°F)	17.7 (63.9)	18.7 (65.7)	21.6 (70.9)	23.0 (73.4)	24.1 (75.4)	24.3 (75.7)	23.6 (74.5)	23.6 (74.5)	23.6 (74.5)	24.1 (75.4)	18.7 (65.7)	18.0 (64.4)	21.7 (71.1)
Mean daily minimum °C (°F)	11.6 (52.9)	12.6 (54.7)	15.0 (59.0)	16.6 (61.9)	17.7 (63.9)	17.7 (63.9)	17.1 (62.8)	17.1 (62.8)	17.1 (62.8)	15.0 (59.0)	13.1 (55.6)	12.1 (53.8)	15.2 (59.4)
Record low °C (°F)	2.8 (37.0)	2.8 (37.0)	3.9 (39.0)	9.4 (48.9)	11.7 (53.1)	11.7 (53.1)	10.5 (50.9)	11.1 (52.0)	11.1 (52.0)	7.2 (45.0)	4.4 (39.9)	4.4 (39.9)	2.8 (37.0)
Average rainfall mm (inches)	2 (0.1)	2 (0.1)	36 (1.4)	53 (2.1)	49 (1.9)	61 (2.4)	38 (1.5)	81 (3.2)	61 (2.4)	20 (0.8)	8 (0.3)	1 (0.0)	412 (16.2)
Average rainy days (≥ 0.1 mm)	1	1	3	6	7	9	8	10	11	4	1	0	61
Average relative humidity (%)	65	65	58	57	56	55	53	53	55	56	61	64	58
Average dew point °C (°F)	11 (52)	12 (54)	12 (54)	15 (59)	15 (59)	14 (57)	15 (59)	16 (61)	15 (59)	12 (54)	12 (54)	11 (52)	13 (56)
Mean daily sunshine hours	8.9	9.8	9.7	11.2	11.9	12.1	11.8	12.2	11.4	9.6	8.7	7.6	10.4
Percentage possible sunshine	80	73	80	73	64	73	64	64	73	80	80	80	74
Source 1: Food and Agriculture Organization: Somalia Water and Land Management (temperatures, humidity and percent sunshine)
Source 2: Deutscher Wetterdienst (extremes and precipitation) Time and Date (dewpoints, 2005-2015) Weather Atlas (daily sun hours)

Climate data for Berbera
Month	Jan	Feb	Mar	Apr	May	Jun	Jul	Aug	Sep	Oct	Nov	Dec	Year
Record high °C (°F)	35.3 (95.5)	35.0 (95.0)	35.0 (95.0)	42.2 (108.0)	47.3 (117.1)	49.1 (120.4)	47.7 (117.9)	46.7 (116.1)	46.0 (114.8)	41.7 (107.1)	36.7 (98.1)	36.1 (97.0)	49.1 (120.4)
Mean daily maximum °C (°F)	27.9 (82.2)	29.2 (84.6)	30.7 (87.3)	31.0 (87.8)	35.7 (96.3)	42.8 (109.0)	42.9 (109.2)	41.9 (107.4)	39.7 (103.5)	33.1 (91.6)	30.0 (86.0)	28.6 (83.5)	34.5 (94.1)
Daily mean °C (°F)	25.0 (77.0)	25.0 (77.0)	26.1 (79.0)	28.3 (82.9)	31.1 (88.0)	33.5 (92.3)	36.1 (97.0)	35.6 (96.1)	33.3 (91.9)	28.8 (83.8)	26.7 (80.1)	26.7 (80.1)	30.0 (86.0)
Mean daily minimum °C (°F)	21.3 (70.3)	21.6 (70.9)	23.3 (73.9)	25.2 (77.4)	27.7 (81.9)	31.0 (87.8)	31.8 (89.2)	31.1 (88.0)	29.3 (84.7)	24.0 (75.2)	22.2 (72.0)	21.6 (70.9)	25.8 (78.4)
Record low °C (°F)	14.4 (57.9)	15.6 (60.1)	16.7 (62.1)	18.9 (66.0)	20.6 (69.1)	22.2 (72.0)	20.6 (69.1)	20.0 (68.0)	17.8 (64.0)	16.7 (62.1)	16.1 (61.0)	15.0 (59.0)	14.4 (57.9)
Average rainfall mm (inches)	8 (0.3)	2 (0.1)	5 (0.2)	12 (0.5)	8 (0.3)	1 (0.0)	1 (0.0)	2 (0.1)	1 (0.0)	2 (0.1)	5 (0.2)	5 (0.2)	52 (2.0)
Average rainy days (≥ 1.0 mm)	0.6	0.6	0.5	0.7	0.8	0.1	0.3	0.5	0.4	0.2	0.3	0.4	5.2
Average relative humidity (%)	78	79	79	81	73	49	44	45	51	72	74	76	67
Percentage possible sunshine	80	80	80	83	83	87	80	87	87	87	87	80	83
Source 1: Arab Meteorology Book (average temperatures, humidity and precipitation), Deutscher Wetterdienst (precipitation days, 1908–1950 and extremes)
Source 2: Food and Agriculture Organization: Somalia Water and Land Management (percent sunshine)

== Coastline ==
Map of Somaliland with claimed territorial waters

Somaliland has a total coastline of 850 kilometres (530 mi), along the Gulf of Aden. In February 2017, Somaliland declared a 200 miles (320 km) Exclusive Economic Zone and a 24 nautical mile Contiguous Zone in addition to its claimed territorial waters. Internationally, however, the waters are still recognized as belonging to Somalia.

== See also ==
- Somaliland
- List of cities in Somaliland
