= List of protected areas of Somalia =

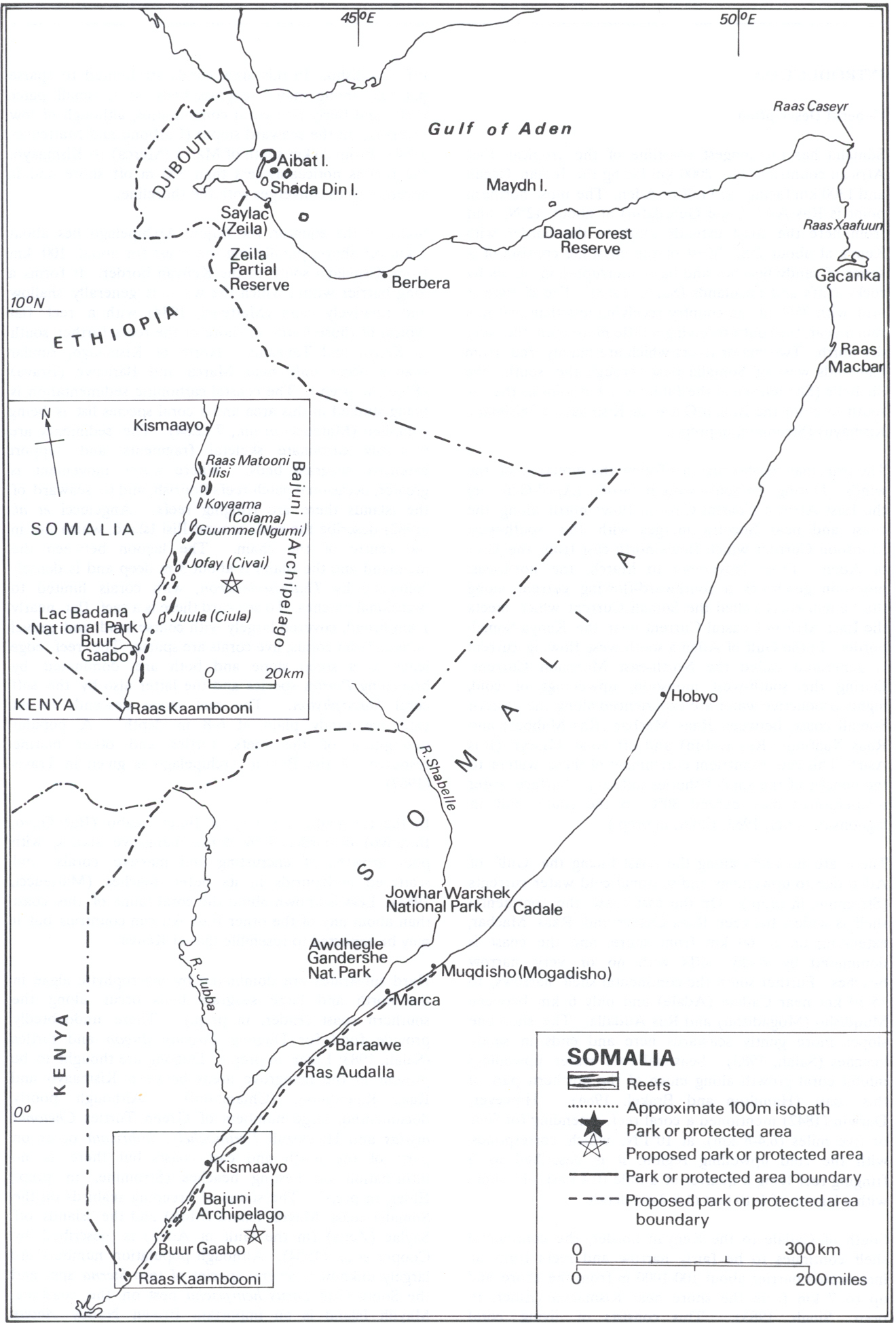
Somalia's ecological parks, coral reefs and protected areas.

This is a list of protected areas of Somalia. Protected areas include national parks and wildlife reserves. The boundaries and areas of Somalia's protected areas are not reported, and there has been little formal protection or management of most areas since the collapse of Somalia's central government in 1991.

== National parks ==
- Arbawerow National Park
- Baraako madow National Park
- Buloburto National Park
- Bushbushle National Park
- Daalo Mountain
- Ga'an Libah National Park
- Hobyo National Park
- las'anod National Park
- Ras Hafun National Park
- Shoonto National Park
- Taleh-El Chebet National Park
- Zayla National Park
- Jilib National Park
- Kismayo National Park
- Lag Badana National Park

== Wildlife reserves ==
- Awdhegle-G Wildlife Reserve
- Boja swamps Wildlife Reserve
- Dandoole Wildlife Reserve
- Eji Obaale Wildlife Reserve
- Far Wamo Wildlife Reserve
- Haradere Wildlife Reserve
- Jowhar Wildlife Reserve
- Lack Badana Wildlife Reserve
- Lack Dare Wildlife Reserve

== See also ==
- Cabdibille game reserve
- Waamo Idow national park
- Mataan Robley Gorges
- Calishoraa Ruins
- Robaa Galmo fortress
