= Geeldora =

Geeldora Road is the road that links between Badhan and the historical city of Laasqoray in Somaliland. The length of the road is 97 kilometres (60 mi), approximately 60 kilometres (37 mi) of which traverses the hilly terrains that forms the Cal Madow mountain range with breath-taking scenery.

The condition of the road is very poor. It was built by the locals in the late 1970s to link the towns of Badhan and Laasqoray.

After the civil war, the road was in bad state but, in late 2008, locals organized to fix some damaged sections.

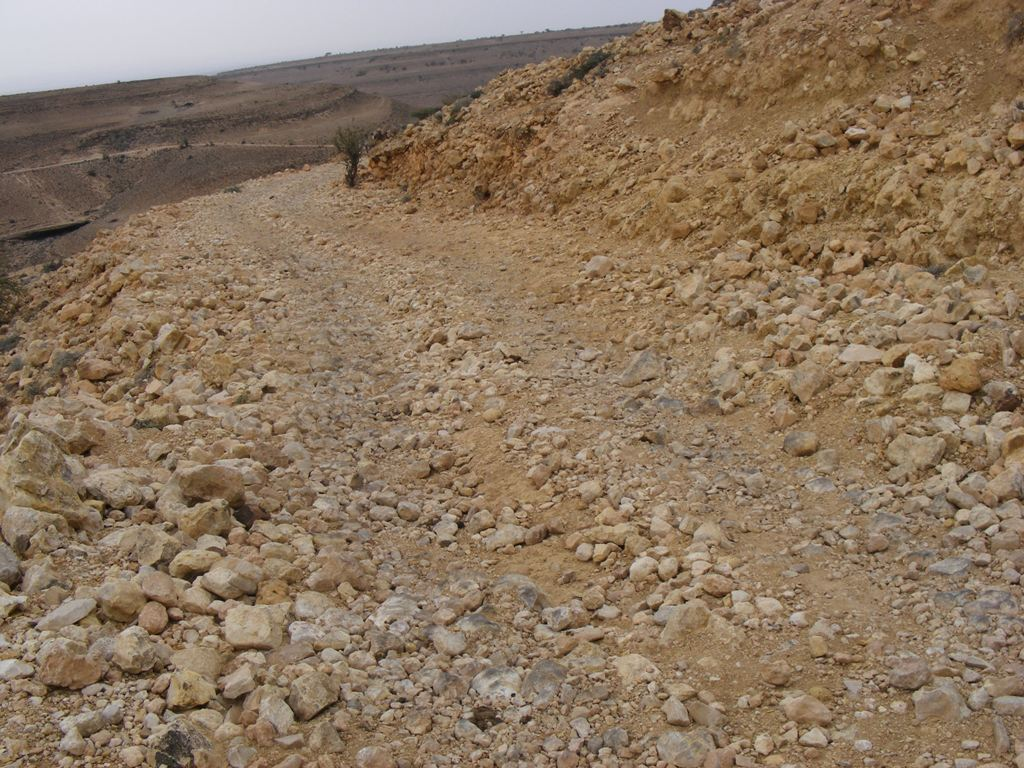
Hilly terrain of the road

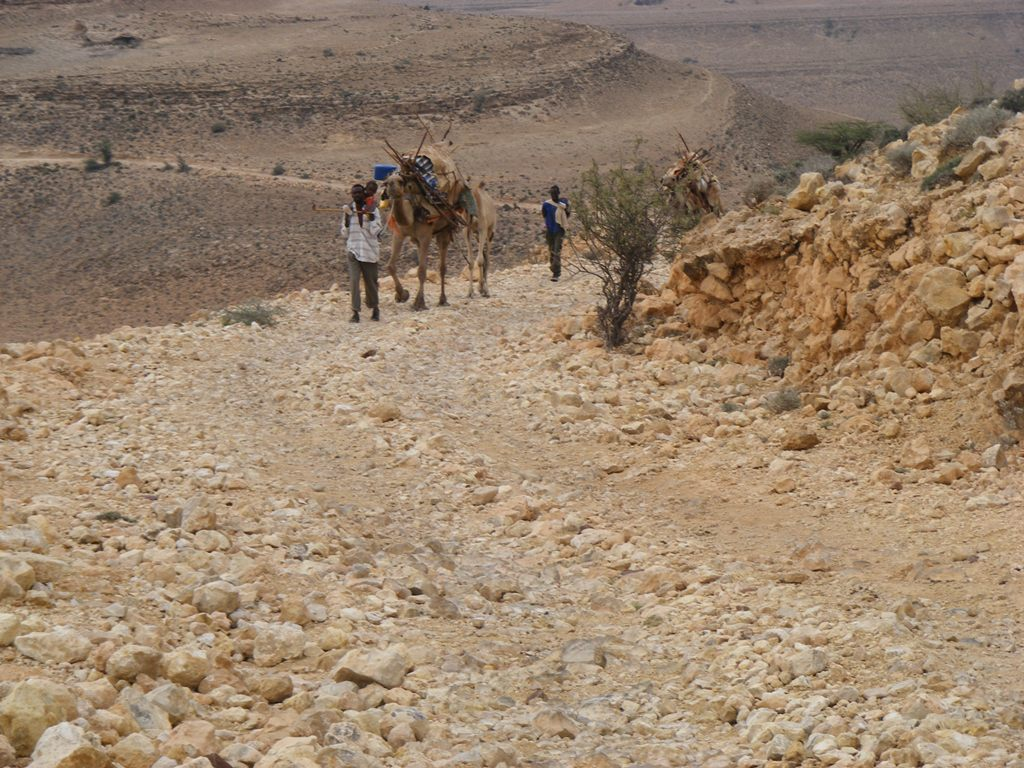
Nomads using the road

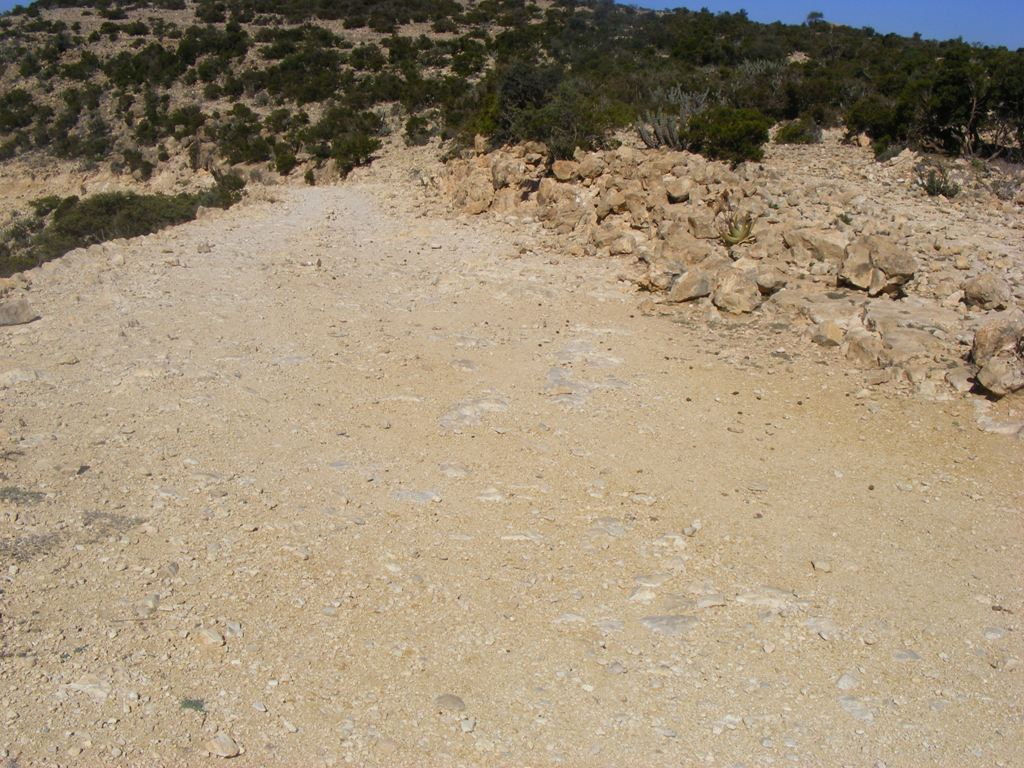
Hilly terrain of the road

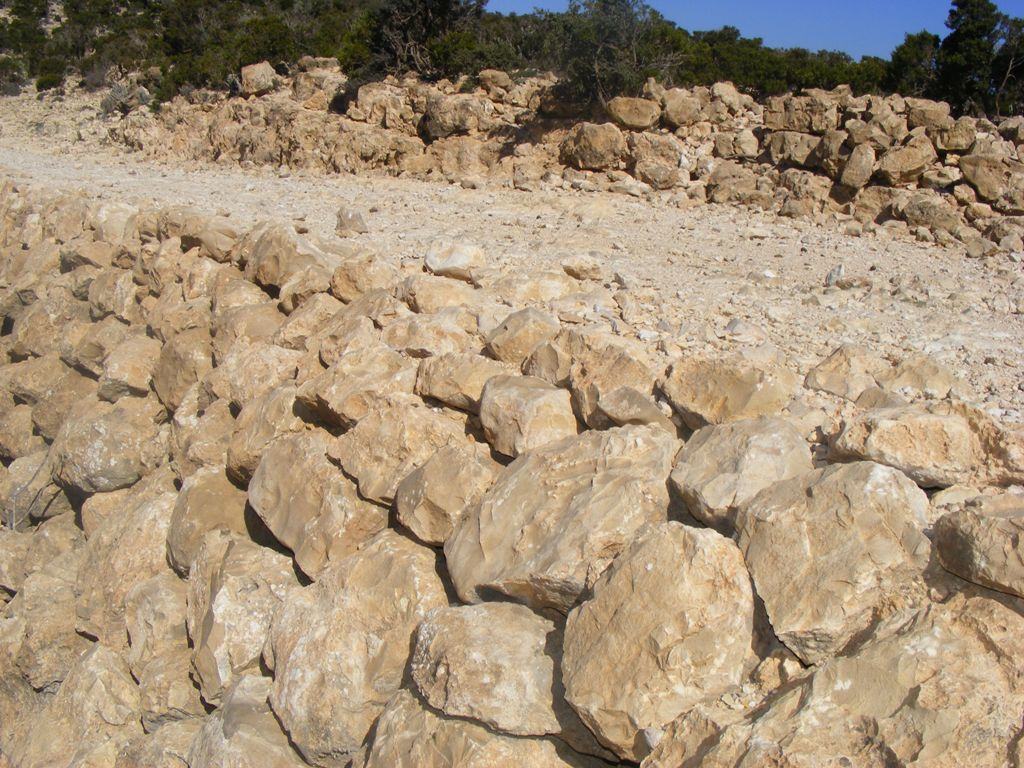
Hilly terrain of the road

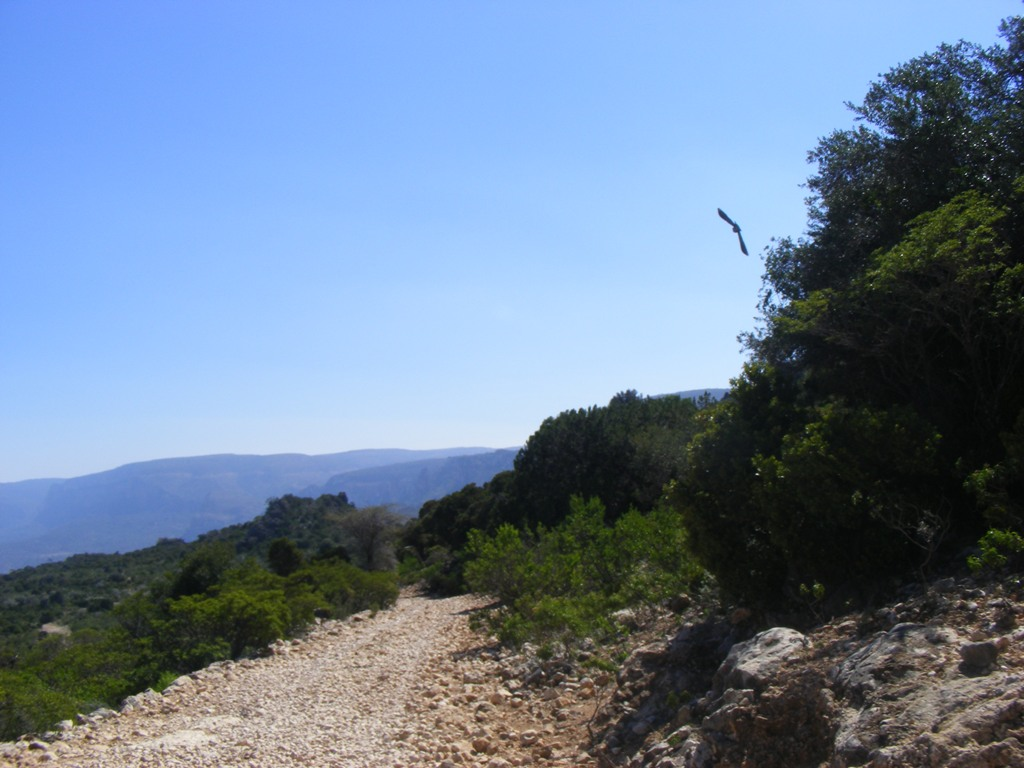
Hilly terrain of the road

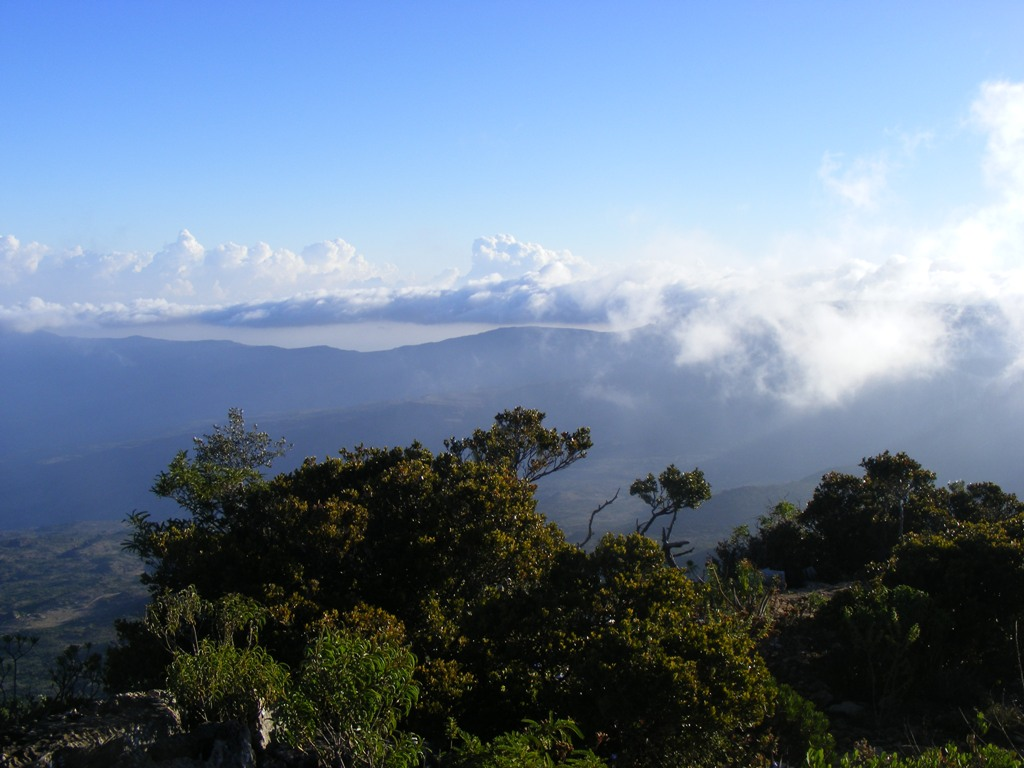
Overview of Almadow, which Geeldora Road goes through
