= Guban =

Coastal plain of Somalia

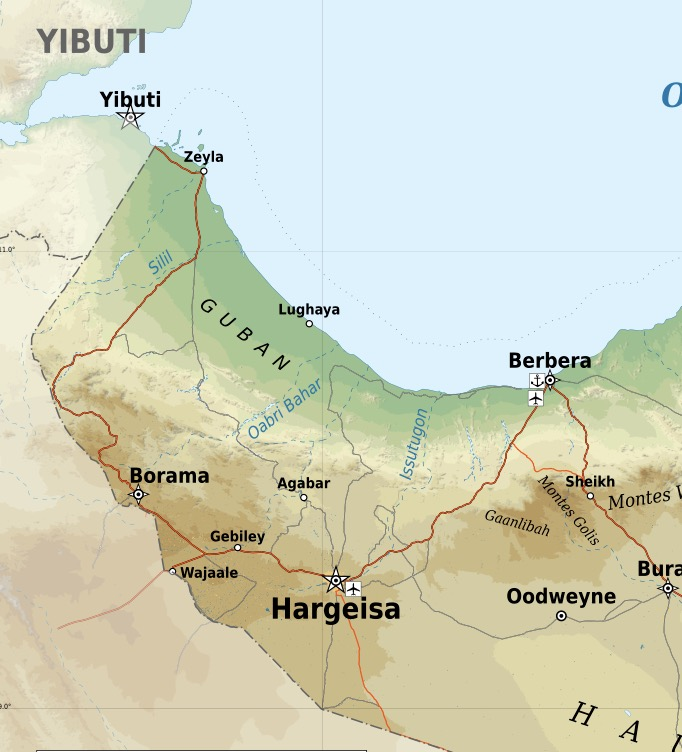
Guban coastal plain and the broader Guban land, a coastal strip forming the northwestern part of Somalia.

Guban (Somali: Guban), meaning "burnt" or "burned," is a vast coastal plain in Somaliland, stretching between the Awdal and Sahil regions. It runs parallel to the Gulf of Aden for about 240 km (150 miles), from Seylac in the west to Berbera in the east. The plain narrows gradually from approximately 56 km (35 miles) in the west to about 6 km (4 miles) in the east. Guban is sandy, low-lying, and lies mostly under 100 meters above sea level. The region experiences high temperatures, humid conditions, and minimal rainfall, averaging around 50 mm per year. Vegetation is sparse, mainly consisting of steppe plants. Seasonal rivers cross the plain, which gradually rises toward the Galgodon Highlands to the south, reaching approximately 1,980 meters in elevation. Ecologically, Guban lies within the Djibouti xeric shrublands, a semi-desert ecoregion along the southern Red Sea and northern Gulf of Aden coasts.

== Etymology ==
The term Guban derives from the Somali root gub, meaning "to burn" or "to scorch," a reference to the region's extreme heat and arid conditions. It refers to the desert coastal plain extending from Djibouti eastward along Somaliland. The plain reaches its widest extent inland at approximately 95 km, while in other areas particularly near Cape Guardafui, it narrows dramatically to only a few hundred meters.

== Climate and Hydrology ==
Climatically, the Guban is a dry and sparsely vegetated zone that receives limited and irregular rainfall, mainly during the relatively cooler months between October and March. Despite its aridity, the landscape is crossed by numerous tugs (seasonal dry riverbeds), which indicate occasional flooding caused by heavy rains in the adjacent highlands. These episodic floods recharge subsurface water reserves, making groundwater accessible through shallow wells dug beneath the sandy soil, and allowing limited human and animal habitation in the region.

== Geography ==
Physical map of Somaliland.

Somaliland is geographically divided into three main regions: Guban, Ogo (or Ogo Plateau/Highland), and the Haud. Guban forms the coastal lowlands in the northwest ( most of Somaliland excluding Togdheer), the Ogo constitutes the central plateau to the south of Guban (Sanaag and Togdheer), and the Haud forms the southern tip of Somaliland near the Ethiopia–Somaliland border in the south.

The Ogo highlands rise as a series of mountain ranges extending from the escarpments that border the Guban to the Ogaden frontier, and running roughly parallel to the northern Somali coast as far as Cape Guardafui. The highest elevations occur along the escarpment edge, reaching approximately 2,400 metres in the Erigavo area. Rainfall increases with altitude and, particularly in the western highlands, is sufficient to support limited agriculture. Overall, the Ogo highlands are relatively well watered throughout much of the year. Further south, the highlands gradually descend into the Haud Plateau, an extensive semi-arid region that forms one of the principal grazing zones of Somaliland. The Haud is characterized by red soils and the absence of permanent surface water; however, following the rainy seasons, it becomes covered with tall grasses that provide valuable pasture, especially for camels. The plateau is intersected by shallow valleys and natural depressions which temporarily hold rainwater, forming seasonal pools that persist for several months before drying out.

== Guban Desert ==
The Guban Desert, located along the northern Somali coast, extends to the easternmost tip of the region near Cape Guardafui. The desert is characterized by hot, dry plains, sparse steppe vegetation, and rocky outcrops, including blackened rocks near the coastline. The surrounding landscape includes mountainous regions and flat plains. The terrain is mainly sandy. Typical flora and fauna include cacti, desert lizards, and small mammals such as antelopes. The desert is sparsely populated.
