= HNP =

HNP may refer to:

== National parks ==
- Hargeisa National Park in Somalia
- Hustai National Park, in Mongolia

== Other uses ==
- Haranpur Junction railway station, in Pakistan
- Herenigde Nasionale Party, a defunct South African political party
- Herstigte Nasionale Party, a South African political party
- Hindeloopen railway station, in the Netherlands
- Host Negotiation Protocol, in the USB On-The-Go standard
- Huaneng Power International, a Chinese power company
- Hugpong ng Pagbabago, a political alliance in the Philippines
- Human neutrophil peptides or alpha defensins 1-4
