= Gaanlibah =

Mountainous area in Somaliland

Gaanlibah Gacan Libaax Ga'an Libah, Gan Libah
- Archaeological site
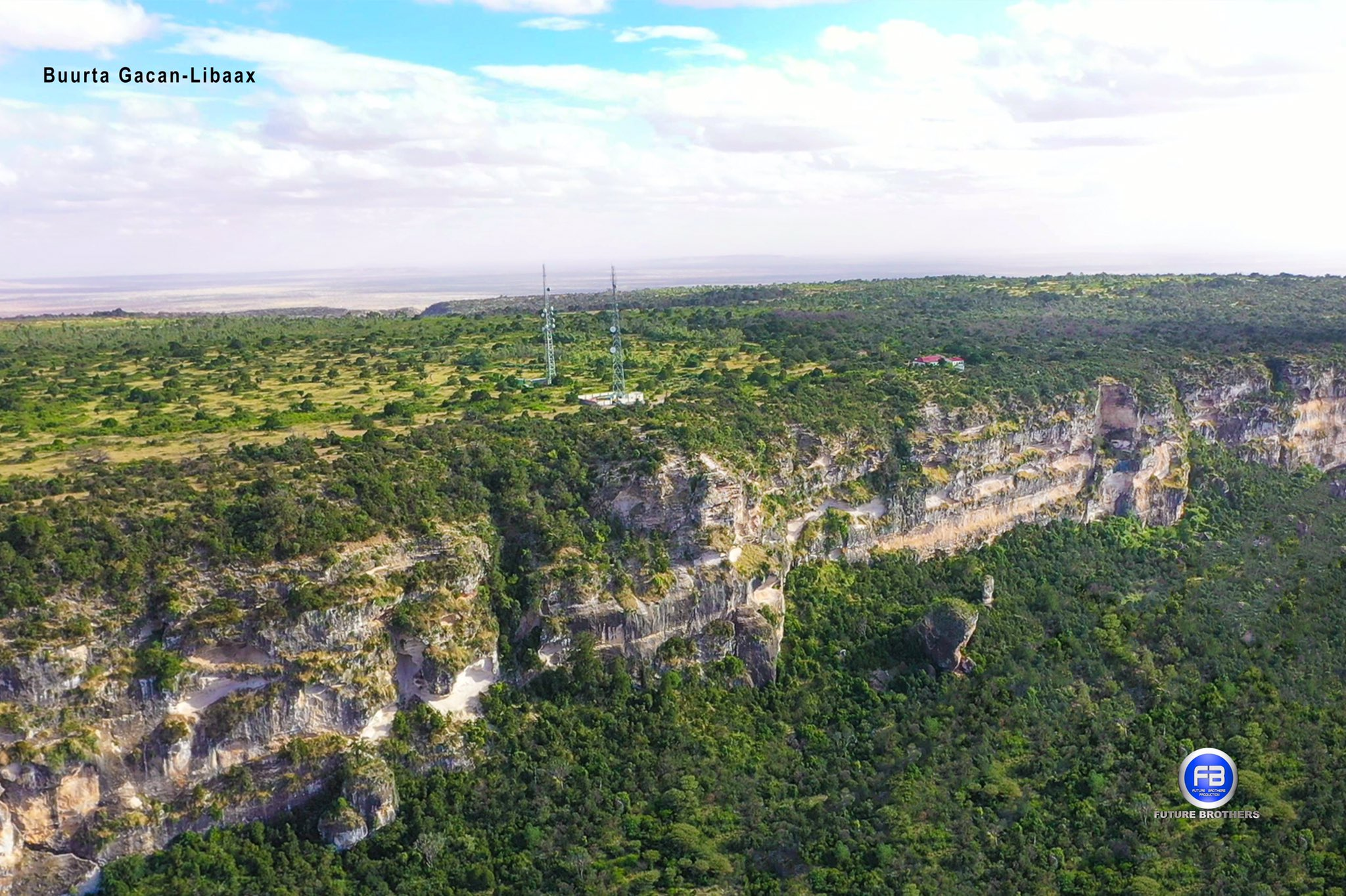
- Gaanlibah mountain range

- Location in the Horn of Africa Gaanlibah (Somaliland) Gaanlibah (Africa)
- Coordinates: 9.8613886°N 44.8148563°E
- Country: Somaliland
- Region: Maroodi Jeex & Hargeisa District
- Time zone: UTC+3 (EAT)

Gaanlibah or Ga'an Libah (Somali: Gacan Libaax) English : The lion's paw ) is a mountain range, archaeological site, and national park located in the Maroodi Jeex region of Somaliland.

== Geography ==
The site is near the Golis Mountains. Its upper slopes are the source of the seasonal Togdheer river that flows through the city of Burao into the Nugaal Valley. Gaanlibah is not far from Laas Geel and around 100 km (62 mi) east of the provincial capital Hargeisa. It is in the western part of the northern mountains, which extend east and west parallel to the northern coast of the Horn of Africa.

Gaanlibah is primarily inhabited by people from the Somali ethnic group, with the clan eponyms of Adam Isa and Abokor Isa of Isamusa especially well-represented.

== Flora and fauna ==
The natural vegetation includes evergreen and semi-evergreen bushland and thicket at lower elevations, dominated by the shrub Buxus hildebrandtii, which cover approximately 20,000 ha. Woodlands of African juniper and other Afromontane plant communities occur at higher elevations, and cover about 30,000 ha.

Mammals recorded here include hamadryas baboon, klipspringer, beira and dorcas gazelle.

The site has been designated an Important Bird Area (IBA) by BirdLife International. Native birds include the sombre rock chat, Gambaga flycatcher and Somali golden-winged grosbeak.

== Rock art ==
The site features a number of caves adorned with rock art of animals and other figures. As no major archaeological excavation has been conducted here, the Gaanlibah paintings are of uncertain origin, purpose and date.
