= Kismayo National Park =

National park in Somalia

- IUCN category II (national park)
- Location within Somalia
- Location: Lower Juba, Somalia
- Nearest city: Jamaame
- Coordinates: 0°21′29″S 42°32′43″E

Kismayo National Park (KNP) is a national park in Kismayo, Somalia, also known as Haabar Waalid.

The park is 17 miles from Kismayo town.

In this national park, many animals roam freely in their protected habitat. The park is home to indigenous animals from the region, like the Vervet monkey. This characteristic makes this park special and unique.

During the drought the previous government had built ponds or mini lakes to avoid migration, some says leopards and other predators and most impala and elephants never migrated due to availability of water all year round, the only time most migrated is when country was in war itself. Hyenas have been spotted as well as lions and few other predators.

== See also ==
- List of national parks of Somalia
