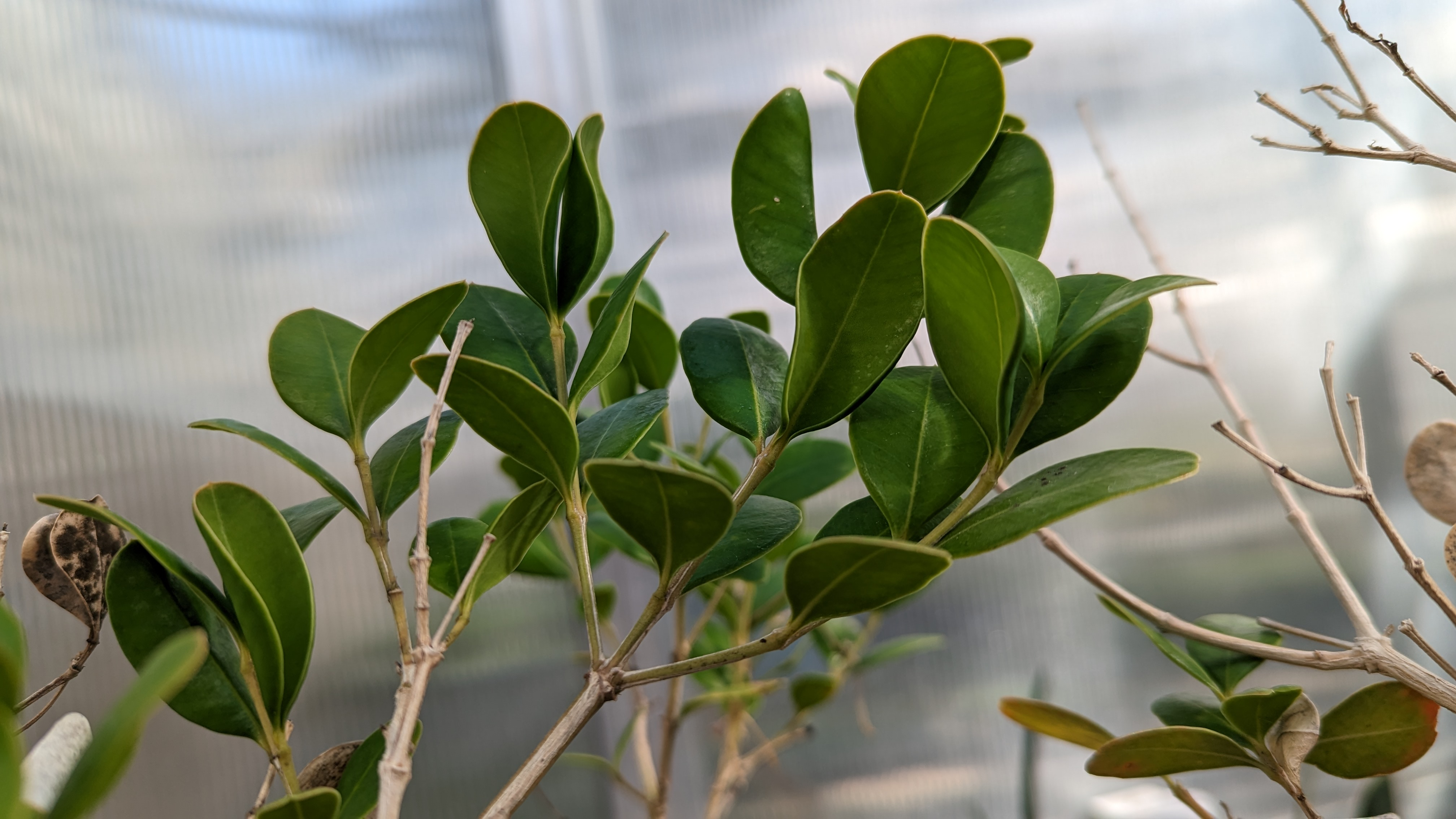

Conservation status
- Least Concern (IUCN 3.1)

Scientific classification
- Kingdom: Plantae
- Clade: Tracheophytes
- Clade: Angiosperms
- Clade: Eudicots
- Order: Buxales
- Family: Buxaceae
- Genus: Buxus
- Species: B. hildebrandtii

Binomial name
- Buxus hildebrandtii Baill.

Synonyms
- Buxanthus pedicellatus Tiegh.; Buxus calophylla Pax; Buxus pedicellata (Tiegh.) Hutch.; Garcinia buxifolia Chiov.

= Buxus hildebrandtii =

Species of shrub or small tree

Buxus hildebrandtii is a species of shrub or small tree native to the Horn of Africa.

== Description ==
Buxus hildebrandtii is a shrub or small tree. It is generally below 6 meters in height, but can grow up to 9 meters high and a trunk diameter up to 15 cm under favorable conditions. The leaves are oval in shape, leathery and olive-green, 2 to 5 cm long and 0.5 to 2.5 cm wide.

== Range and habitat ==
Buxus hildebrandtii is found in the foothills and mountains of eastern Ethiopia, Djibouti, Somaliland, northern and central Somalia, and on Socotra Island. It grows in semi-arid semi-evergreen or evergreen shrubland communities, generally between 600 and 2000 meters elevation, which lie between lowland Acacia-Commiphora bushlands and thickets and high-elevation juniper forests.

In coastal central Somalia, Buxus hildebrandtii is also found Hobyo grasslands and shrublands, where limestone gorges provide shelter and moisture which sustains shrubland plant communities at lower elevations.
