= Hargeisa National Park =

National park in Somalia

- IUCN category II (national park)
- Location within Somaliland
- Location: Maroodi Jeex, Somaliland
- Nearest city: Berbera
- Coordinates: 10°N 44.5°E

Hargeisa National Park (HNP) is a national park in Hargeisa, Somaliland. Located outside the city of Hargeisa in the north.

== See also ==
- Daallo Mountain
