= Lag Badana National Park =

National park in Somalia

- IUCN category II (national park)
- Location within Somalia
- Location: Lower Juba, Somalia
- Nearest city: Kismayo
- Coordinates: 1°23′S 41°35′E
- Area: 3,340 km^{2} (1,290 sq mi)

Lag Badana National Park (Bushbush National Park) is a national park of Somalia. It is located on the far southern coast, next to the border with Kenya.

== History ==
Lag Badana was the first national park to be established in the country. During the second half of the 1980s, the Ministry of Tourism under the Siad Barre administration sought to center the tourist industry in the vicinity of the park, with nearby coral reefs and offshore islands likewise envisioned as part of the development.

By 1989, newer legislation was drafted governing the establishment of national parks, game reserves and special reserves. The conservation of wildlife resources was at this time overseen by the Ministry of Livestock, Forestry and Range's National Range Agency. Its Department of Wildlife also operated an independent law-enforcement unit, which had been created through presidential decree.

Following the outbreak of the civil war in 1991, development of the national park came to a halt. In August 2014, President Hassan Sheikh Mohamud announced a number of new development projects aimed at Somalia's youth. Among these was an initiative to assign leadership of the national park to young managers so as to strengthen environmental preservation and potential tourism opportunities.

== Environment ==
The Lag Badana area contains over 200 vascular plant species and is home to rare small animals in the forests like the lesser kudu. Of the plants, around 20 are endemic. Since 2005, the protected area is considered a Lion Conservation Unit. The park has been designated an Important Bird Area (IBA) by BirdLife International.
