= Lamadaya =

- لَمَدايَ
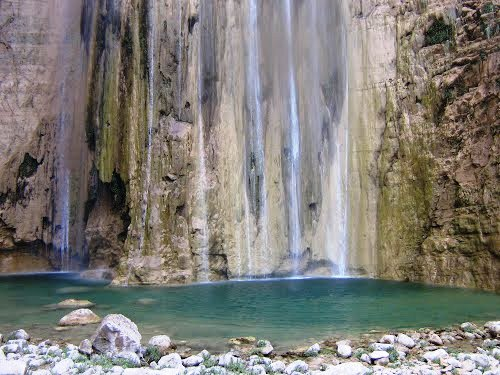
- Lamadaya water falls in Sanaag

- Location within Somaliland Location within Africa
- Location: Cal Madow, Ogo Mountains, Sanaag, Somaliland
- Coordinates: 10°44′09″N 47°14′42″E
- Elevation: 2,410 metres (7,907 ft)

Lamadaya (Somali: Lamadaaye, Arabic: لَمَدايَ, romanized: Lamādaya) are waterfalls that are located in the Cal Madow mountain range in the Sanaag region of Somaliland. The meaning of the word in the Somali language is "not to be looked at", owing to the waterfalls' steep incline atop a high hill. The nearest town to Lamadaya is Ulheed, which is situated towards the Red Sea coast. Warsengali clan

== Gallery ==
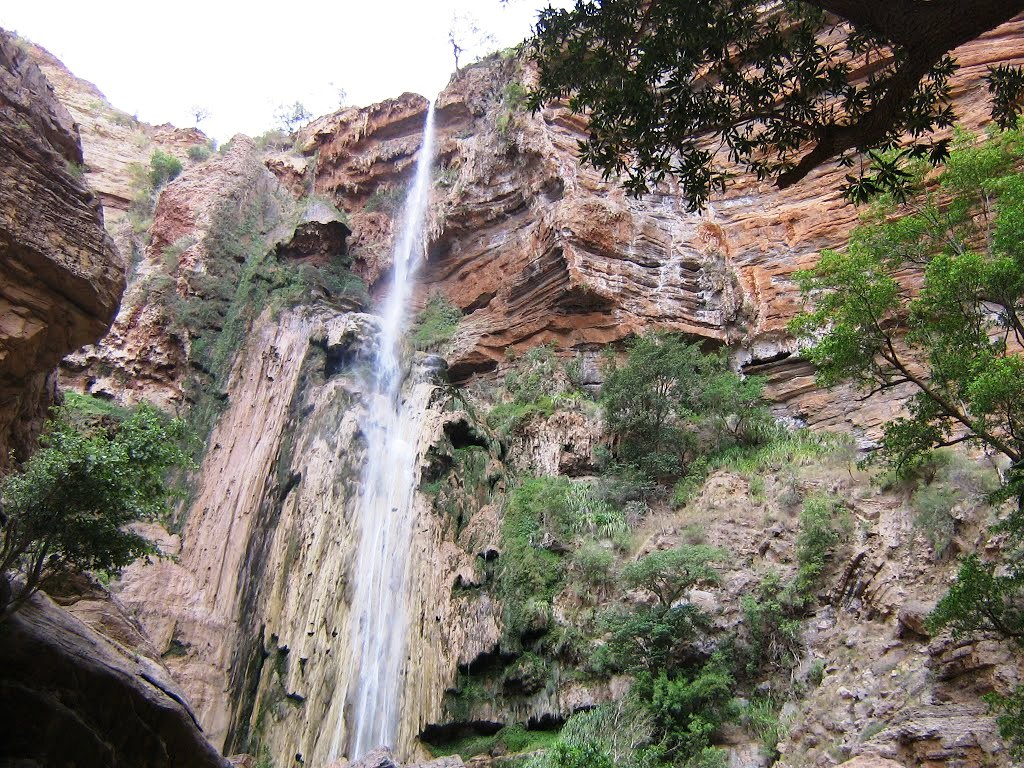

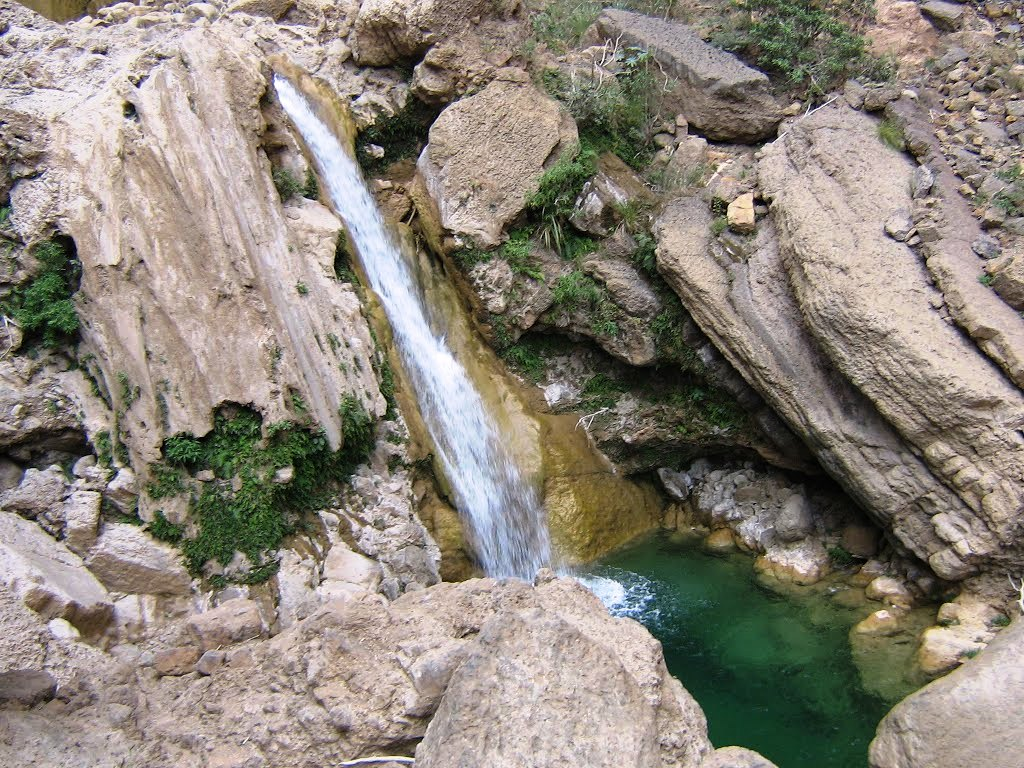

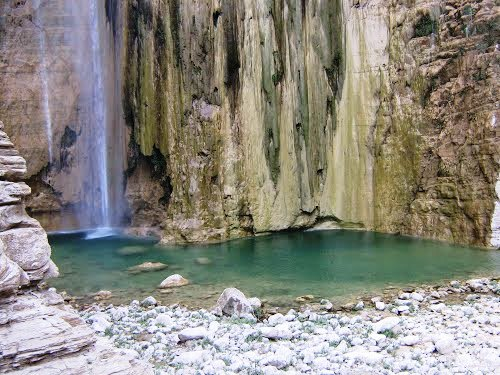

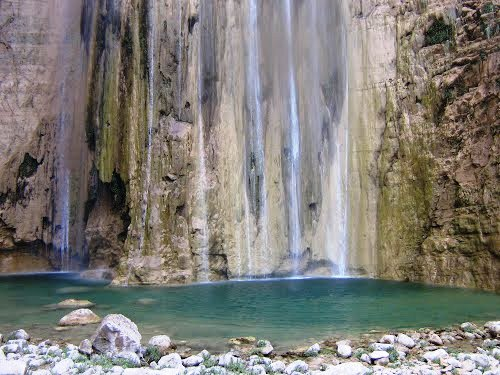

== See also ==
- List of waterfalls
