= Golis Mountains =

Mountains in Somaliland

Golis
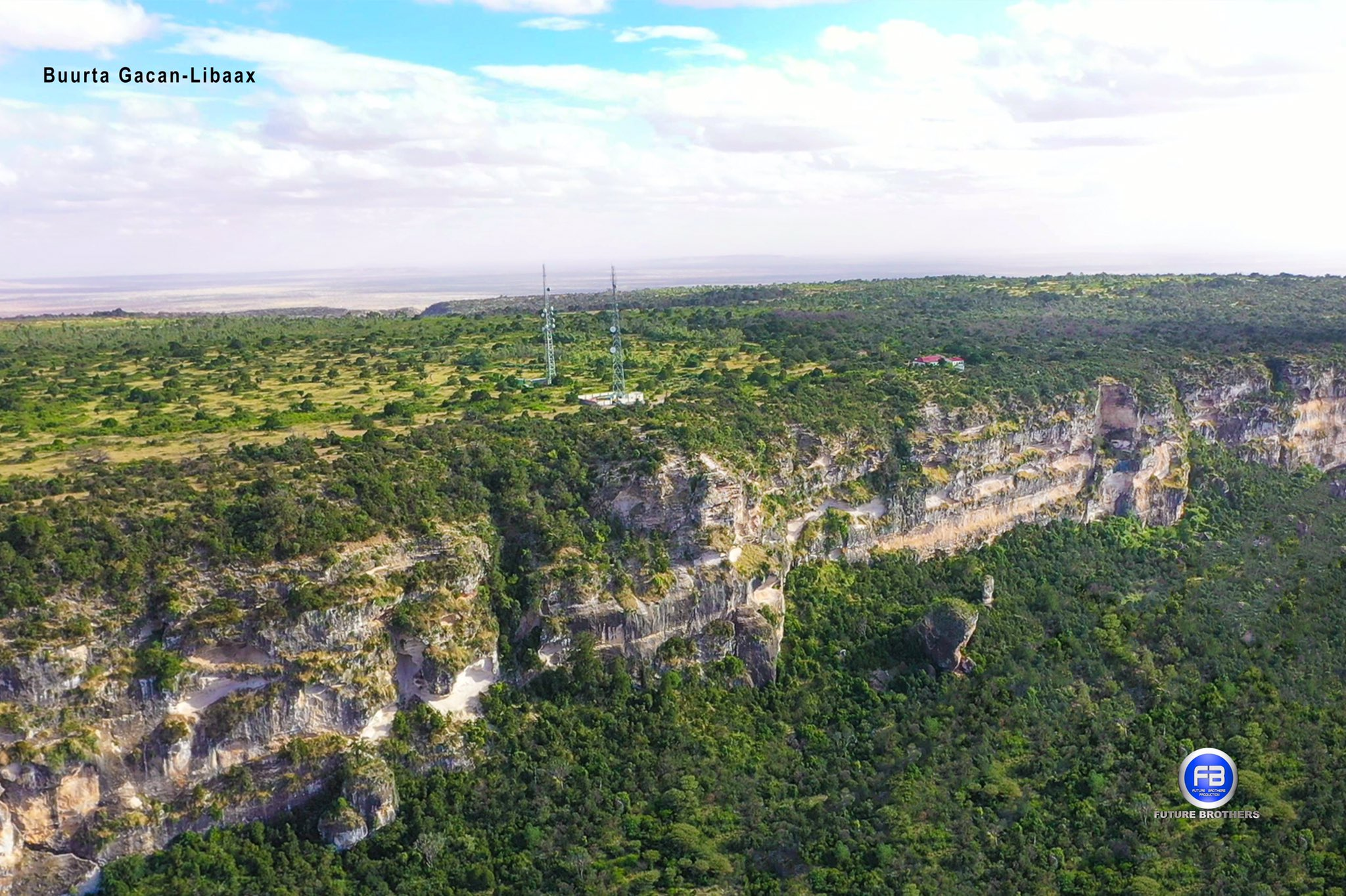
- Foothills of the mountain range

Highest point
- Elevation: 1,371 m (4,498 ft)
- Coordinates: 9°52′0″N 44°55′0″E

Geography
- Location within Somaliland Location within Africa
- Location: Somaliland/Somalia

The Golis Mountains (Golis range, Somali: Buuraleyda Golis) are a mountain range in Somaliland. Also known as Qar Golis, they cut through the Togdheer region, and end near the Gan Libah.

The original meaning of Golis Mountains is a mountain range near Golis mountain, but since the Somali Civil War, the entire so-called Karkaar mountains are often referred to as the Golis Mountains.

== Golis mountains in its original meaning ==
The mountain range near Sheikh is the Golis Mountains in its original sense, and also the Golis Mountains in today's narrower sense.

=== Area ===
In 1898, a map published in Two Recent Journeys in Northern Somaliland shows the Golis Range as being around 10 degrees north latitude and 44 degrees 30 minutes to 45 degrees 30 minutes east longitude.

The North-Eastern British Somaliland of 1931 lists the area from 45°E to 46°E as the "Golis mountains" and the area near the border with Italian Somaliland as the "Al hills".

A general survey of the Somaliland protectorate 1944-1950, a book published in 1951, refers to the combined topography of the Golis and Wogr mountains as the Golis-Wogr Range. The book says Golis Mountain is the name of a mountain east of Henweina and west of Sheikh. The town of Sheikh is located in the Sheikh Gorge between Golis Mountain to the west and Wogr Mountain to the east.

In The World Atlas published by Soviet Union in 1967, the Golis Mountains are only shown around Golis mountain, and the area around Wogr mountain just east of Golis mountain is called Wogr Mountains. The mountain ranges east of the Wogr mountains have no names written on them.

=== Jerato Pass ===
This range has a mountain pass known as the "Jerrato Pass".

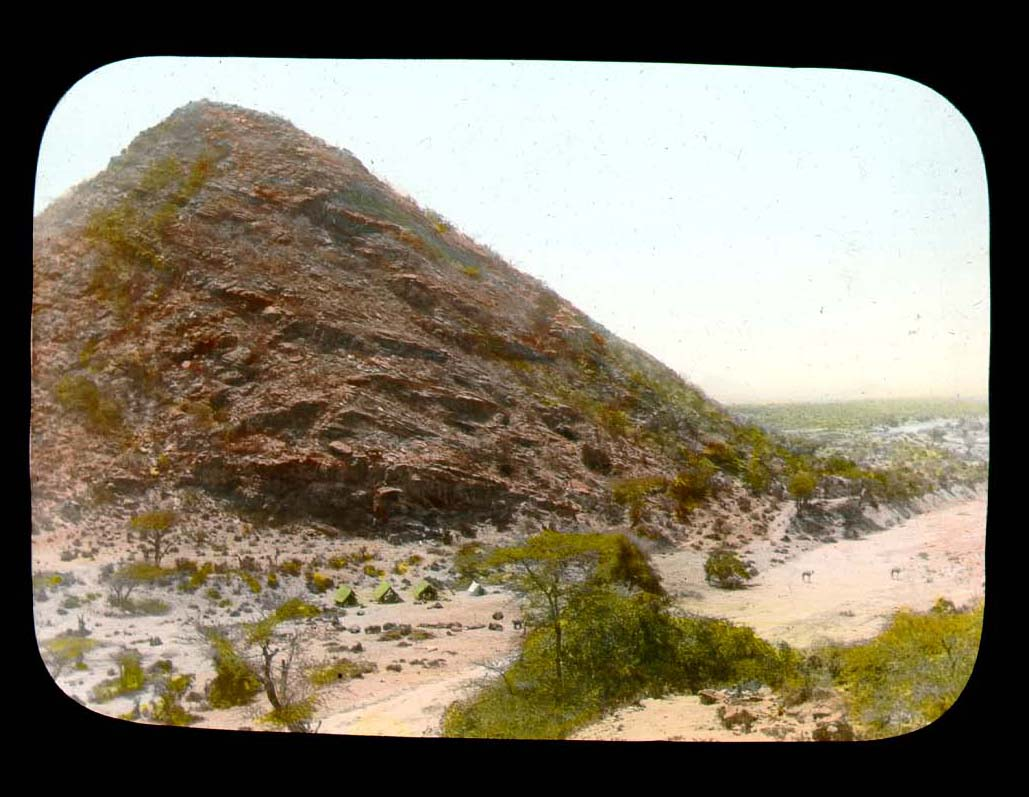
The Jerato or Gellato Pass, 1896

=== Outlook ===
The eastern part of the Golis mountains is sandy, with many mimosa trees, and in some places Aloe and Sansevieria ehrenbergii.

According to British Somaliland and Sokotra published in 1919, a large number of Zebu cattle were raised around the Golis Mountains for the purpose of making Ghee. The meat and Ghee were exported to Aden in Yemen and the hides to the United States.

== Names of mountain ranges on the northern coast of the Somali Peninsula ==
The original Golis Mountains is the name of a mountain range at the northwestern edge of the Togdheer region. However, there is an intermittent east-west mountain range on the northern coast of the Somali Peninsula, which is now often referred to as the Golis Mountains.

Especially after it was discovered that gold could be extracted near the village of Milho on the border of the Bari and Sanaag regions, pro-Islamic State militias and others made this location their base of operations, and the term "Golis Mountains" is often used to refer to the mountain range near the border between the Bari and Sanaag regions. However, it is mainly after the Somali civil war that this terminology has been used.

=== Before Somali civil war ===
In the article North-Eastern British Somaliland written in 1931, it distinguishes between the "Golis Range" west of Mount Shimbiris and the Al Hills to the east.

A map published by the US Army in 1968 lists the mountain range north of Sanaag as Al Mado; the Wagger Range is mentioned as a range near Sheikh, but the name Golis Range is not mentioned.

The Historical Dictionary of SOMALIA, published in 1975, states "GOLIS MOUNTAINS. In the north-central area of the Republic. Mountain peaks reach an altitude of almost 8,000 feet."

A map published in 1989, U.S. National Imagery and Mapping Agency, Series Y629, also shows the mountain range north of Sanaag as Buuraha Cal Madow.

=== After Somali civil war ===
In the 1996 book Constructing colonial hegemony in the Somaliland protectorate, 1941-1960, the Golis Mountains are described as "for three hundred miles runs parallel to the coastal plain", this corresponds to Sheikh to Bosaso in a straight line.

In the web edition of the Encyclopædia Britannica written in 1998, the mountain range on the north coast of the Somali Peninsula is referred to as the Galgodon Highlands or Ogo Highlands.

In 2002, ReliefWeb wrote that Gebi valley is located between Hadeed Plateau and Golis Mountains in Sanaag.

According to the CULTURAL ORIENTATION SOMALI published by the Defense Language Institute in 2020, the Golis Mountains is another name for the Galgala Hills, part of the Karkaar mountain range. and the Ogo Highlands are south of the Karkaar mountain range.

== Golis Mountains in Sanaag ==
Since around 2009, the Golis Mountains appear exclusively as a place name in Sanaag, especially the mountains near Galgala on the eastern edge. Both Al-Shabaab and the Islamic State (ISIS) operate from this mountain range and are fighting for territorial control.

=== Recent History ===
In 2009, the Golis Mountains experienced a highly religious insurgency led by Mohamed Said Atom.

In 2012, al-Shabaab replaced Atom as the leader of the Golis Mountains rebel group.

In 2015, Islamic State began working in Puntland.

In 2017, a large quantity of heavy ammunition was removed from African Union Mission to Somalia and Somali National Army bases. It is believed that these are still being stored at the Al-Shabaab base in the Golis Mountains as of 2022.

In 2019, al-Shabaab conducted a campaign of gold mining as a source of funding in the village of Milho near the Golis Mountains.

In 2019, According to the Armed Conflict Location and Event Data Project, U.S. forces conducted six airstrikes against ISIS and one against al-Shabaab in the Golis Mountains, killing a total of 32 people.

In August 2021, the Islamic State based in the Golis Mountains occupies Balidhidin in the Bari region.

In March 2022, Puntland forces kill several al-Shabaab soldiers in the Dhagah-dhaabur and Habar-hagoogan hills of the Golis range.

== See also ==
- Administrative divisions of Somaliland
- Regions of Somaliland
- Districts of Somaliland
