= Daallo Mountain =

National park in the eastern Sanaag region of Somaliland

Daallo Mountain/ Daalloarab Mountain
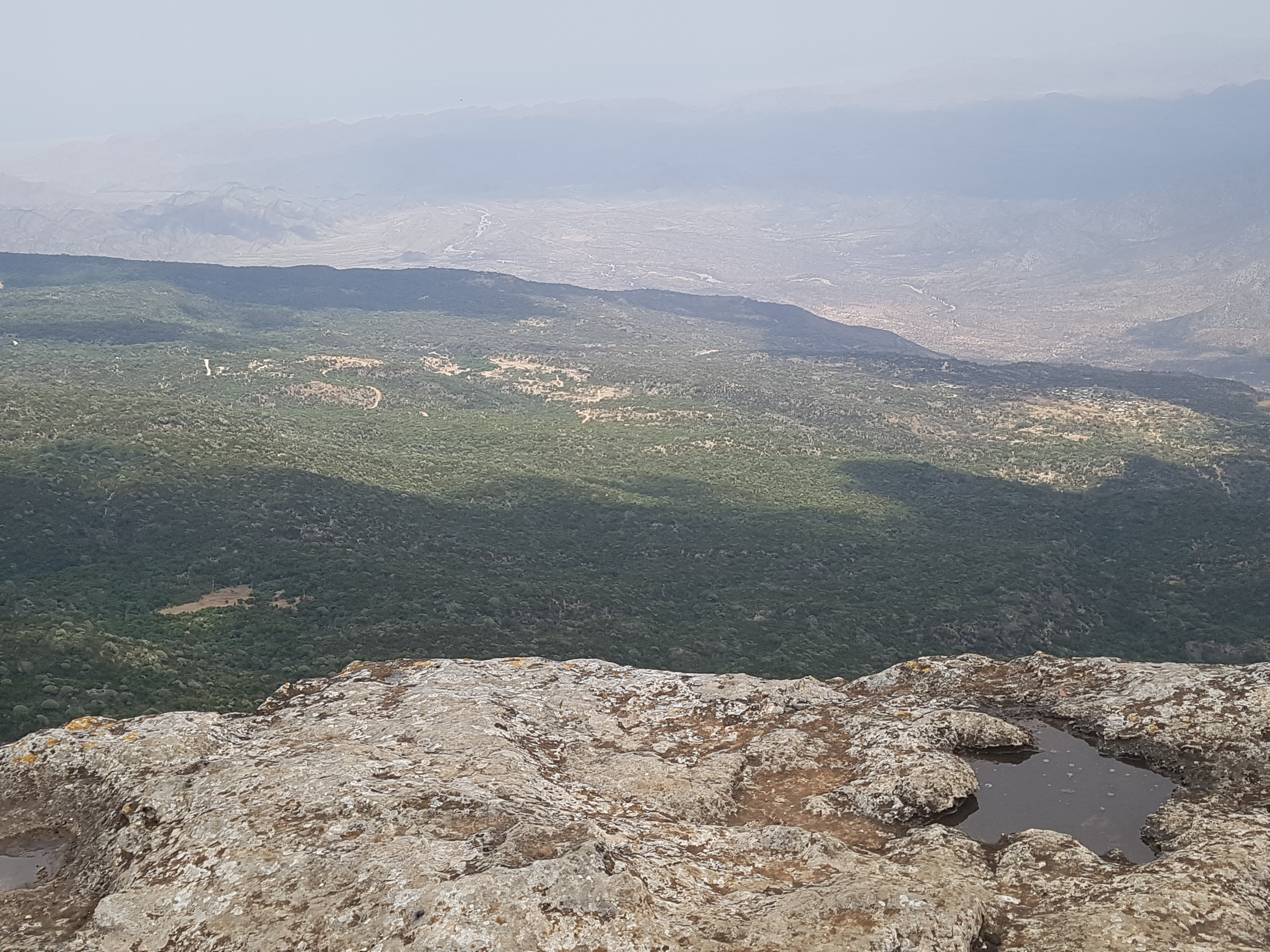

- Location within Somaliland
- Location: Sanaag, Somaliland
- Nearest city: Erigavo
- Coordinates: 10.8°N 47.35°E

Daallo Mountain (Somali: Buuraha Daalo) is a national park in the eastern Sanaag region of Somaliland. It is a part of the Ogo Mountains. Daallo has historically been inhabited by the ancient ancestors of most of the original Somali tribes.

== Geography ==
The reserve extends inland from the coast, rising steeply from the coastal plain to the top of the scarp of the limestone mountains. On the summit of the scarp, average annual rainfall is about 650 mm.

=== Environment ===
Daallo is a prime example of an unspoiled wilderness, a dense forest on a limestone and gypsum escarpment near to the base of Mount Shimbiris, Somaliland's tallest peak. Some of the trees in the park are over 1000 years old. Many plants from the park have medicinal value.

=== Fauna ===
The site has been designated an Important Bird Area (IBA) by BirdLife International. Notable bird species include the Warsangli linnet and Socotra golden-winged grosbeak. Mammals present include the dorcas gazelle, Somali wild ass and beira.

== See also ==
- Administrative divisions of Somaliland
- Regions of Somaliland
- Districts of Somaliland
- Somalia–Somaliland border
