= Cal Madow =

Mountain range in Sanaag, Somaliland

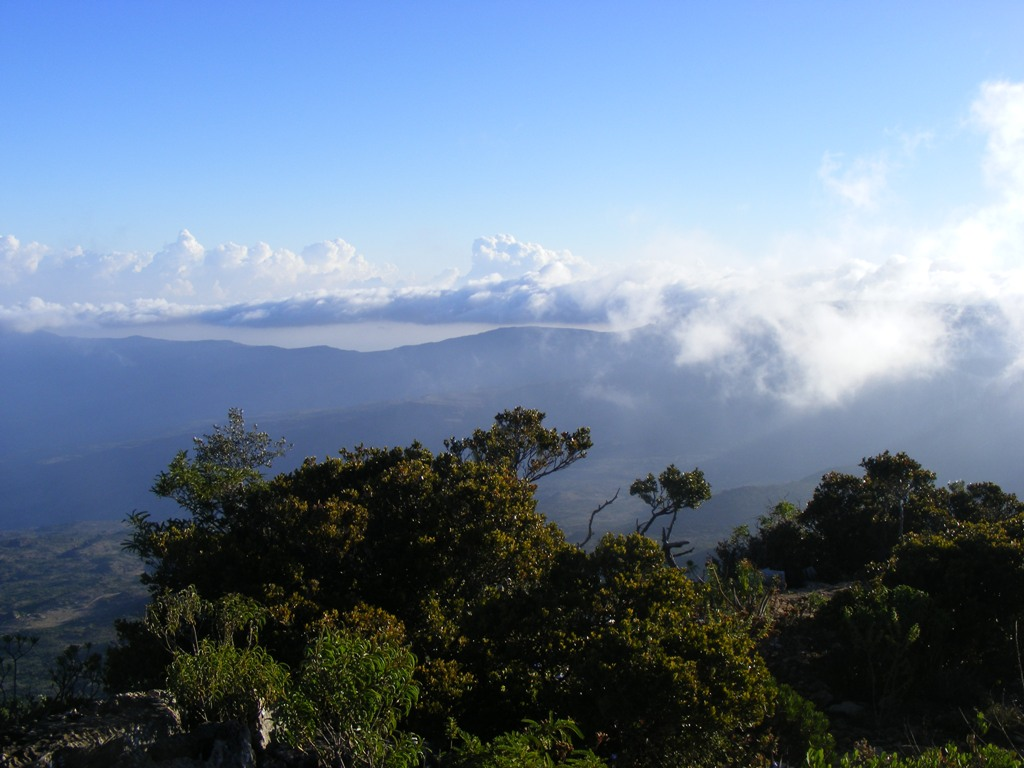
- Overview of the Cal Madow mountains

Highest point
- Elevation: 2,410 metres (7,907 ft)
- Coordinates: 10°44′09″N 47°14′42″E

Naming
- Native name: Buuraha Calmadow (Somali); عَلَمْدُو (Arabic)

Geography
- Location within Somaliland
- Location: Sanaag
- Countries: Somalia, Somaliland
- Parent range: Ogo Mountains

Climbing
- Easiest route: Hike

Cal Madow (also Calmadow, Al Madow, Al Medu, or Al Mado; Somali: Buuraha Calmadow; Arabic: عَلَمْدُو, romanized: ʿAlamdū) is a mountain range in Somaliland and Puntland. It stretches across the area of Sanaag all the way to western Bari. Its peak sits at almost 2,500 m (8,200 ft) in Shimbiris, northwest of Erigavo. Cal Madow was a tourist destination in the late 1980s. The local population of the Sanaag region is primarily responsible for preserving the habitat, which continues to face the risk of deforestation.

== Ecology ==
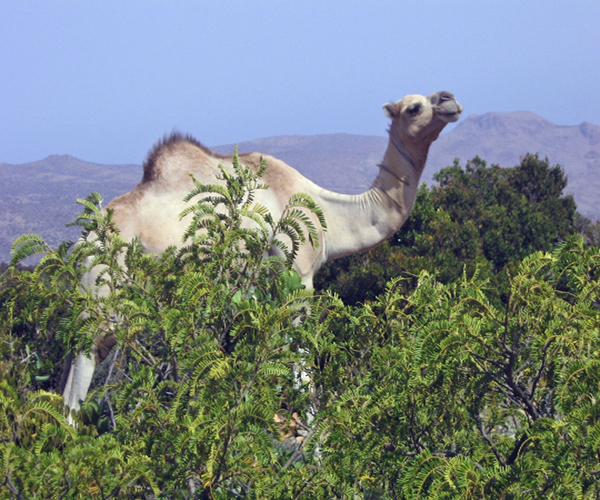
A camel peering over the leafier portions of Cal Madow

The dense mountain forest sits at an altitude of between 700–800 m (2,300–2,600 ft) above sea level, and has a mean annual rainfall of 750–850 mm (30–33 in). In addition to rainfall, Cal Madow receives additional precipitation in the form of fog and winter rains, which sustain isolated forests of Juniperus procera, Buxus hildebrandtii, and others. Mist also appears to be important in the distribution of juniperus (dayib), one of the species locals use for timber. For timber production, the buxus (dhoqos), buxus and celtis (boodaar) poles are cut from living trees in the evergreen forest. The discovery of the locust bean (Ceratonia oreothauma), lavenders and many other plant species has emphasized the many links the Cal Madow highlands have with the Mediterranean region. The Lamadaya waterfalls has one of the best-known sceneries in Cal Madow.

Despite the current changes in land use, Cal Madow has internationally valuable unexploited mineral deposits and unique natural habitats. It is considered a key area for oil exploration, and has a petroleum system identical to, and formerly contiguous with, those within the Republic of Yemen. Florally, Cal Madow has approximately 1,000 plant species, 200 of which are only found on this mountain range. The flora of Somalia, much of which constitutes unique genetic resources, contains more than 3000 species of vascular plants, and is thus much richer than that of the Sahel region in general. Of the 156 plant families observed in Somalia, about 21% are restricted to Somalia, while 11% are found in the south. Somalia houses a greater number of endemic plant species, many of which grow in the northern and eastern regions, notably in Cal Madow. Most of these species are herbs not found anywhere else in the world.

Cal Madow and adjacent areas also have richer fauna than many other parts of Horn of Africa, and harbor some of the rarest and most localized of Somali endemic animal species. Here, Warsangli linnet (Carduelis johannis), pigeons (acanthus olivae) and golden-winged grosbeaks can be observed, as can antelopes such as the beira (dorcatragus megalotis), and different subspecies of gazelles.

=== Botanical survey ===
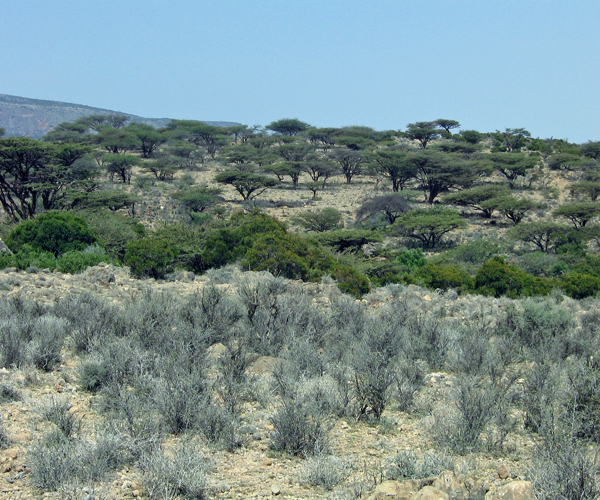
The unique flora of Cal Madow

In January 1995, a team of botanists led by Dr. Mats Thulin of Uppsala University in Sweden visited the Cal Madow range on behalf of the Flora of Somalia project based in Uppsala. The study they conducted under the guidance of Somali Prof. Ahmed Warfa (Department of Botany and Range, Somali National University) constituted the most extensive botanical survey ever done in the area, with about eight new species of plants discovered in the process .

Furthermore, the area houses an important germplasm, which requires protection from overexploitation and destruction by humans. On the basis of the recent botanical survey in Cal Madow, the team recommended that the local forest should be conserved as a national monument, as it plays an important role in the mountain range's ecosystem and represents a valuable natural resource.

== See also ==
- Golis Mountains
- Cal Miskaad
