= Mount Shimbiris =

Highest mountain in Somaliland

- Shimbeeris

Highest point
- Elevation: 2,460 m (8,070 ft)
- Prominence: 1,495 m (4,905 ft)
- Listing: Country high point
- Coordinates: 10°44′05″N 47°14′46″E

Geography
- Location: Sanaag, Somalia
- Parent range: Ogo Mountains (part of the Cal Madow range)

Mount Shimbiris (also spelled Shimbeeris) is the highest peak in Somalia. It is also the highest peak in any somali territory. It has an elevation of 2,460 metres (8,071 ft) above sea level. It is located in the Ogo Mountains range, which forms part of the Cal Madow mountain system in the Sanaag region of Somaliland.

Data from the Shuttle Radar Topography Mission (SRTM) indicates that the often-quoted elevation of 2,416 metres (7,927 ft) may be slightly understated. The mountain rises prominently above the surrounding escarpments overlooking the Gulf of Aden.

== Geography ==
Mount Shimbiris is situated near the town of Erigavo, the regional capital of Sanaag. The surrounding Cal Madow range extends parallel to the Gulf of Aden coastline and is characterized by steep ridges, plateaus, and deep valleys. The range forms part of the broader northern Somali highlands.

== Climate ==
Due to its elevation, Mount Shimbiris experiences cooler temperatures compared to much of Somalia’s lowland desert geography. The Cal Madow mountains receive relatively higher rainfall, particularly during seasonal monsoons, supporting forested areas uncommon in much of the country.

== Flora and fauna ==
The mountain and its surrounding areas are part of an ecologically significant zone. The Cal Madow range contains juniper forests and hosts a number of endemic plant species. Wildlife includes various bird species, small mammals, and antelope adapted to mountainous environments.

== Access ==
There is no established vehicle access route to the summit. The mountain is typically reached by foot, and camping is possible for visitors.
