= Ogo Mountains =

Mountain range in Somalia

Ogo Mountains Galgodon Highlands Buuraha Oogo جَبَل أوغو
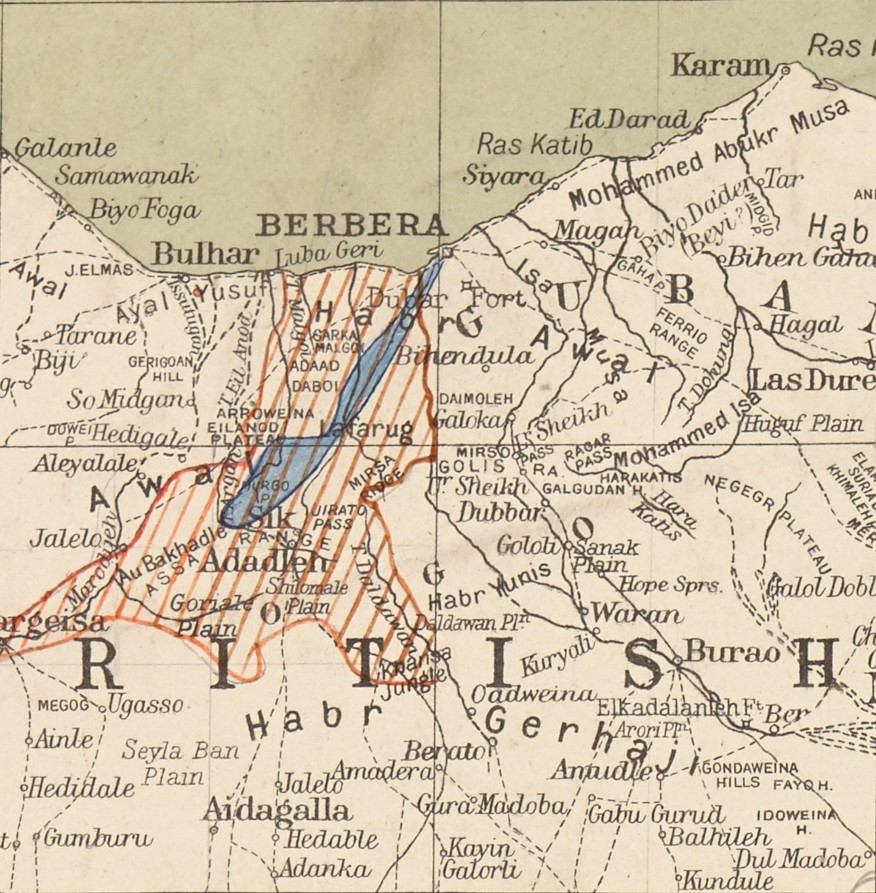
- Map of the Horn of Africa in 1907, from 9–11°N to 44–46°E. The letter Ogo can be seen in the south of Berbera, around 9°40'N 45°E.

Highest point
- Peak: Shimbiris (various theories exist)
- Elevation: 2,450 m (8,040 ft)

Geography
- Country: Somalia
- States: Somaliland, North East State, and Puntland

The Ogo Mountains (Ogo Highlands), also known as the Galgodon Highlands, (Somali: Buuraha Oogo, Arabic: جبل أوغو) are a mountain range in Somalia. They cross the Sanaag–Sahil and Togdheer–Maroodi Jeh regions. However, there is some fluctuation in the literature as to which range is being referred to.

== Etymology and Area ==
Relation map.
Be=Berbera, Bo=Borama, Bu=Burao, Ca=Cape Guardafui, Er=Erigavo, Gu=Gudaado, Ma=Maydh, Mo=Mount Shimbiris, Sh=Sheikh, Ze=Zeila

Ogo is a general term in Somali that means plateau.

In this sense, the coastal lowlands of northern Somalia are Guban, the central plateau is Ogo, and the southern grasslands are Haud.

According to Encyclopædia Britannica, this is a mountain range that runs parallel to the Gulf of Aden, and extends from the western side of Cape Guardafui in the east to the Ethiopian border in the west. There is a gap between Maydh and Erigavo, and between Berbera and Burao via Sheikh.

=== Around Sheikh ===
However, the British who ruled this area from 1884 called the relatively small area the Ogo mountains.

For example, a paper written in 1949 refers to the area around the northern part of Borama as the Ogo mountains. There are depictions such as The mountains of the Ogo, inland from Zeila, reach an average height of about 5000 feet and are continuous with the Wagar and Golis mountains, inland from Berbera, which reach an average height of 6-7000 feet and mountains of the Ogo and adjacent areas in the Haud west of 46°E., i.e., in the higher rainfall areas, etc. Examples of coordinates include 10°10'N 42°50'E, 10°N 43°E, and 9°55'N 43°E.

=== Around Shimbiris ===
On the other hand, the mountain range in the eastern part of Somaliland, as well as the north and west parts of Khatumo State is sometimes called the Ogo Mountains. However, according to a paper written in 1931, the mountain range in the northeast part of Somalia is Cal Madow.

According to the CULTURAL ORIENTATION SOMALI published by the Defense Language Institute in 2020, the Golis Mountains is another name for the Galgala Hills, part of the Karkaar mountain range, and the Ogo Highlands are south of the Karkaar mountain range.

A paper written in 2022 refers to the mountain range in the western half of Somaliland as the Goris mountains and the mountain range in the eastern half as the Ogo mountains.

== Climate ==
As mentioned above, the range of the Ogo mountains is unclear and very wide. So, the climate of the village of Gudaado, which is near Mount Shimbiris, sometimes considered to be the highest peak of the Ogo Mountains, is discussed below.

Due to the Ogo Mountains' elevated highland location, the range has an unexpectedly temperate climate.

The average annual temperature in the Gudaado is 20 to 26 °C (68 to 79 °F). Precipitation reaches a maximum in March, with a minimum of rainfall in August. The average annual precipitation around 500–700 mm (20–28 in).

The data provided below derives from the Gudaado station. It illustrates a subtropical highland climate with strong continental Mediterranean characteristics (Köppen: "Cwb"), given the two marked wet seasons that span between March–May and September–November, albeit the latter being briefer and more subtle. The climatic situation here is most similar to the Altiplano region, due to its semi-arid patterns of rain, huge diurnal temperature variations, adjacence to the Somali desert, and seasonal variations that are neither too cold nor too hot in the extremes.

Climate data for Gudaado (10°44'03.3"N 47°13'56.6"E) (elev. 2239 metres above sea level)
Month	Jan	Feb	Mar	Apr	May	Jun	Jul	Aug	Sep	Oct	Nov	Dec	Year
Mean daily maximum °C (°F)	22.6 (72.7)	23.7 (74.7)	24.1 (75.4)	23.8 (74.8)	24.6 (76.3)	27.1 (80.8)	27.1 (80.8)	26.9 (80.4)	26.4 (79.5)	23.0 (73.4)	22.3 (72.1)	22.2 (72.0)	24.5 (76.1)
Daily mean °C (°F)	16.7 (62.1)	17.8 (64.0)	19.0 (66.2)	19.6 (67.3)	20.0 (68.0)	22.0 (71.6)	22.3 (72.1)	22.1 (71.8)	21.3 (70.3)	18.1 (64.6)	17.0 (62.6)	16.4 (61.5)	19.4 (66.8)
Mean daily minimum °C (°F)	11.7 (53.1)	12.8 (55.0)	14.3 (57.7)	15.6 (60.1)	16.1 (61.0)	17.3 (63.1)	17.8 (64.0)	17.8 (64.0)	17.1 (62.8)	13.9 (57.0)	12.5 (54.5)	11.6 (52.9)	14.9 (58.8)
Average rainfall mm (inches)	9 (0.4)	17 (0.7)	58 (2.3)	160 (6.3)	140 (5.5)	6 (0.2)	1 (0.0)	3 (0.1)	22 (0.9)	90 (3.5)	35 (1.4)	12 (0.5)	553 (21.8)
Source: Climate Data

== See also ==
- Lamadaya waterfalls
