= List of national parks of Gabon =

List of national parks located in gabon

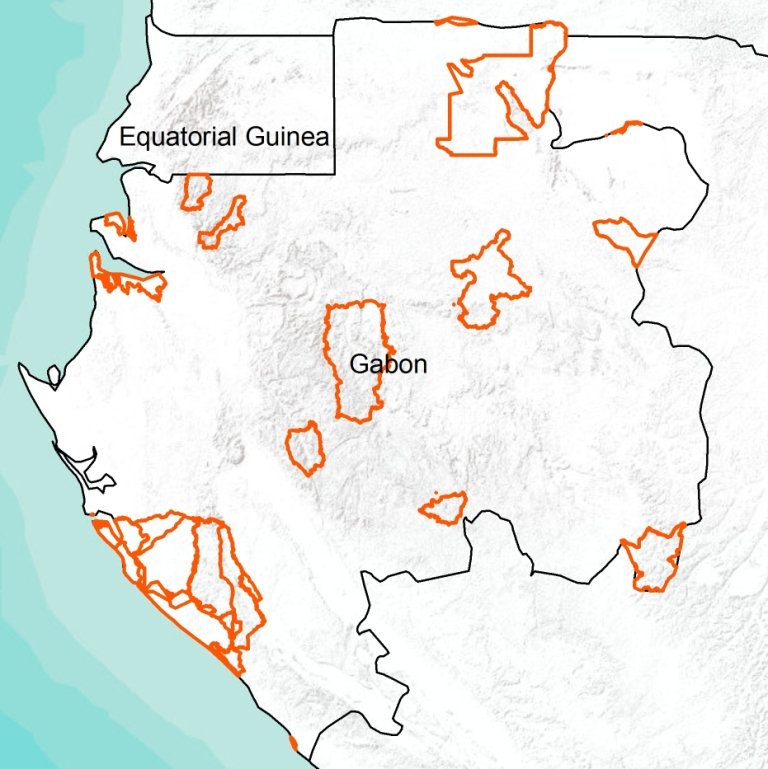
National parks of Gabon

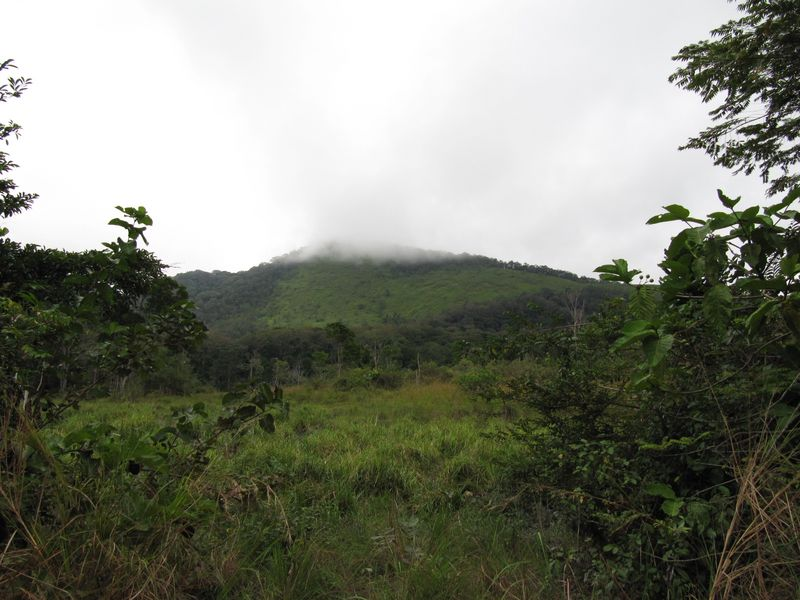
Lopé National Park

There are 13 national parks in Gabon, all created in 2002 when President Omar Bongo established Gabon's National Agency for National Parks (French: Agence Nationale des Parcs Nationaux, ANPN). The national parks cover 10% of the country.

== National parks ==
Name	Area
Akanda National Park	540 km^{2} (210 sq mi)
Batéké Plateau National Park	2,034 km^{2} (785 sq mi)
Birougou National Park	690 km^{2} (270 sq mi)
Crystal Mountains National Park	1,200 km^{2} (460 sq mi)
Ivindo National Park	3,000 km^{2} (1,200 sq mi)
Loango National Park	1,550 km^{2} (600 sq mi)
Lopé National Park	4,910 km^{2} (1,900 sq mi)
Mayumba National Park	870 km^{2} (340 sq mi)
Minkébé National Park	7,570 km^{2} (2,920 sq mi)
Moukalaba-Doudou National Park	4,500 km^{2} (1,700 sq mi)
Mwangné National Park	1,160 km^{2} (450 sq mi)
Pongara National Park	929 km^{2} (359 sq mi)
Waka National Park	1,060 km^{2} (410 sq mi)

== Hunting areas ==
- Iguela Hunting Area
