= Central African mangroves =

Ecoregion in Africa

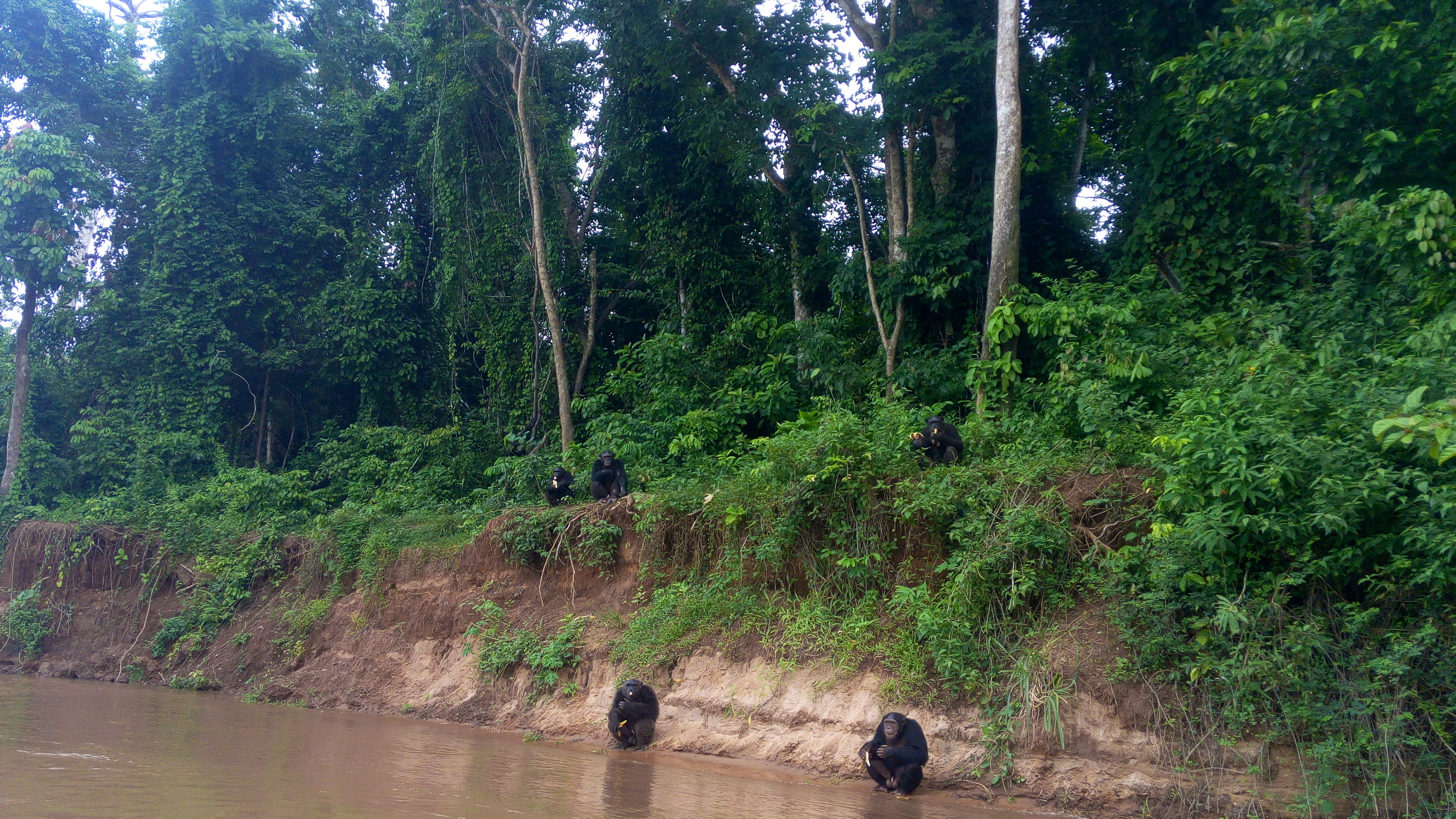
- Douala Edéa National Park

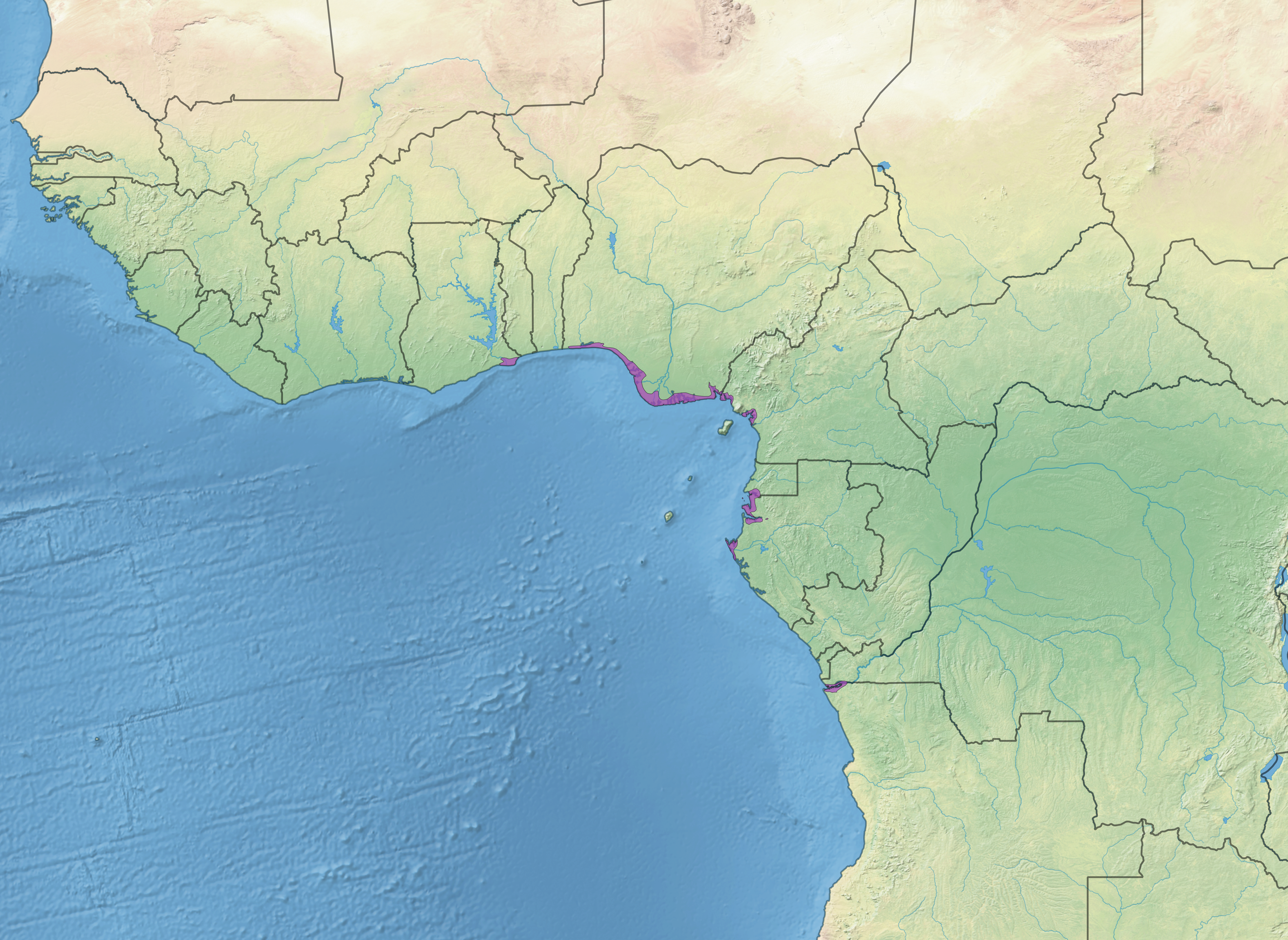
- Map of the Central African mangroves

Ecology
- Realm: Afrotropical
- Biome: mangrove
- Borders: List: Angolan Scarp savanna and woodlands; Atlantic Equatorial coastal forests; Cross–Niger transition forests; Cross–Sanaga–Bioko coastal forests; Guinean forest–savanna mosaic; Niger Delta swamp forests; Nigerian lowland forests; Western Congolian forest–savanna mosaic

Geography
- Area: 27,570 km^{2} (10,640 mi^{2})
- Countries: List: Angola; Cameroon; Democratic Republic of the Congo; Equatorial Guinea; Gabon; Ghana; Nigeria

Conservation
- Conservation status: Critical/endangered
- Protected: 7,261 km^{2} (26%)

The Central African mangroves ecoregion consists of the largest area of mangrove swamp in Africa, located on the coasts of West Africa, mainly in Nigeria.

== Location and description ==
These mangroves are found in fertile rivermouths and lagoons and contain trees up to 45m tall. Most are in Nigeria, with important areas found in Cameroon and Equatorial Guinea/Gabon and patches in Ghana, Democratic Republic of Congo, and northern Angola. The largest area in the region is on the delta of the Niger River on the Gulf of Guinea, while others include the eastern side of the Cross River delta in Nigeria and Cameroon, the Wouri estuary in Cameroon, and the Muni River estuary on the border of Equatorial Guinea and Gabon, and the mouth of the Congo River. As well as being home to much wildlife the mangroves hold rivers in place, filter the waters and create build-ups of nutrient-rich soil on the banks. Mangroves thrive in humid tropical climates where the sea is warm, and where high tides flood into the rivers. Therefore, there is less on the coast of the Congo, where the Benguela Current brings cool seas, but there are patches here and further south in Angola.

== Flora ==
There are five main species of mangrove trees in the ecoregion: red mangrove (Rhizophora mangle), Rhizophora racemosa, and Rhizophora harrisonii, black mangrove (Avicennia germinans) and white mangrove (Laguncularia racemosa), while the palm Nypa fruticans has been introduced from Asia.

== Fauna ==
The rich communities of oysters, crabs, invertebrates and the great variety of fish sheltering and spawning in the mangroves sustain animal life including monkeys, African manatee (Trichechus senegalensis), and turtles like the African softshell turtle (Trionyx triunguis). Birds include breeding waterbirds such as striated heron and reed cormorant and large flocks of others during migration.

== Services related to mangrove ==
Example of services related mangrove services include regulatory, provisional, cultural and supportive.

== Ecological importance ==
=== Biodiversity ===
African mangroves are very rich in biodiversity which helps in providing habitat for different kind of species like fish, birds and crustaceans and they also act as a breathing grounds for many marine/aquatic species.

=== Livelihood ===
The mangroves are very important to local communities. Many living in the Niger Delta rely on the natural resources for their livelihoods. The mangrove forests in this region also provide a breeding ground for fish, protection against floods, and the sequestration of carbon.

== Threats and preservation ==
Nigeria is the most densely populated country in Africa, which puts a strain on the largest remaining areas of these fertile coastal habitats. Much has been cleared for urban and industrial development, such as the oil refineries of the Niger Delta which have also caused the rivers and swamps to become polluted. Urban areas in originally mangrove areas include Lagos in Nigeria and Douala in Cameroon. Other strains on the ecoregion include clearance for salt panning and agriculture. However mangrove is a resilient habitat and small clumps of mangrove remain in isolation all along the coast of west and central Africa.

19.86% of the Central African mangroves are in protected areas. National protected areas include Douala Edéa National Park in Cameroon, Monte Alén National Park in Equatorial Guinea, Akanda and Pongara national parks in Gabon, and Mangroves National Park in Democratic Republic of the Congo. There are several Ramsar Sites (internationally designated wetlands of international importance) including Songor and Keta lagoons in Ghana.
