= Minkébé National Park =

National park in Gabon

- IUCN category II (national park)
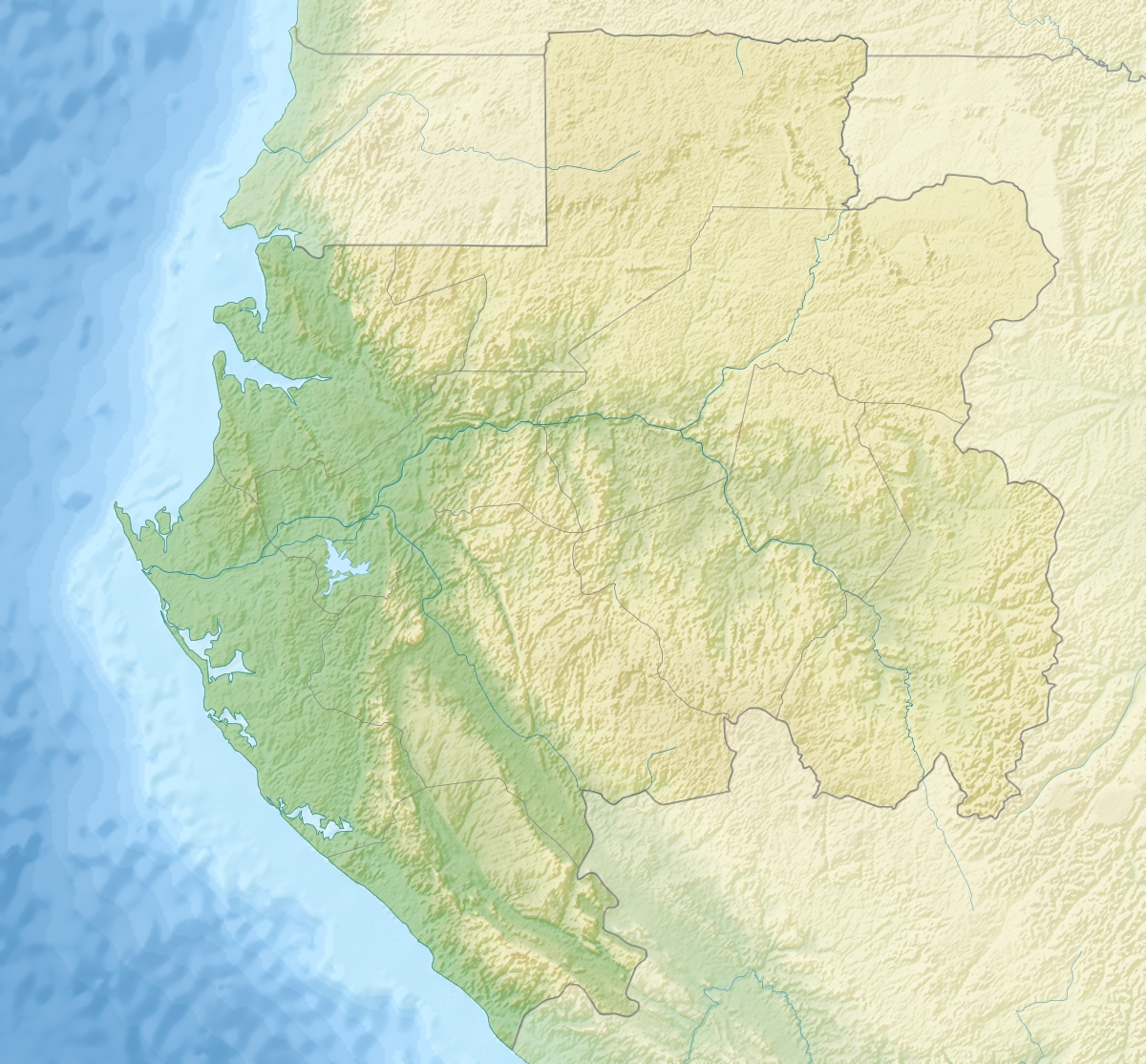
- Location within Gabon
- Location: Gabon
- Coordinates: 1°40′47.18″N 12°45′34.21″E
- Area: 7,570 km^{2} (2,920 sq mi)
- Established: 2000 (provisional); August 2002 (National Park)
- Governing body: National Agency for National Parks

Minkébé National Park (French: Parc National de Minkébé) is a national park in the extreme northeast of Gabon. It covers an area of 7,570 km^{2}. The World Wide Fund for Nature (WWF) said it was an area needing protection in 1989 and began working to protect the forest in 1997. The park was established as a provisional reserve in 2000 and was officially recognized and established by the Gabonese government in August 2002.

It covers 30,000 km².

== History and management ==
In 1997, the WWF initiated a management program and established two main centres of forest command, one at Oyem, the other at Makokou. A central camp was also installed at the mouth of the river Nouna to manage the protected area.

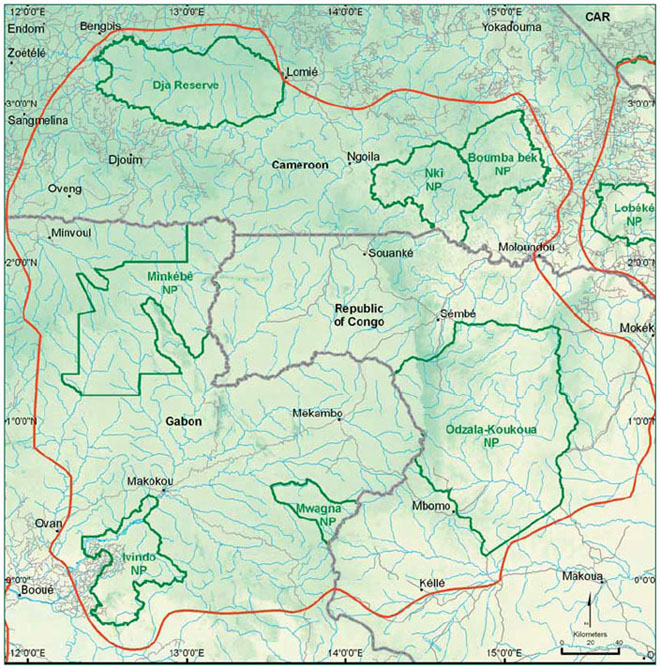
The Congo forest basin under the TRIDOM interzone of protection. Minkébé National Park is shown in the west

The WWF has attempted to create a complex of protected areas in the interzone between Gabon, Republic of the Congo and Cameroon and the Minkebe was intended to become a part of a conservation process on a much broader geographical scale. This interzone is considered one of the most biologically rich forests in Africa and is ecologically a part of the Northwest Congolian Lowland Forest ecoregion, one of WWF's main global ecoregions. This work at a regional level in the interzone between Cameroon, Republic of the Congo and Gabon is known as the Dja- Odzala-Minkébé Tri-National (TRIDOM), where each of the countries have committed themselves to cooperating, implementing and managing the interzone in order to promote conservation and sustainable development. The TRIDOM zone covers 140,000 km^{2} which equates to approximately 7.5% of the Congo Basin's forests.

Although much of the protected area is unspoiled with human intervention, logging of Gabonese redwood trees has increased considerably in recent years where roads have been built and there are two logging concessions in the area which could threaten the park in the future. Other threats to the park include low scale gold mining and hunting for crocodile skin, ivory or meat to sell in the cities of Gabon although this is relatively low. Hunting management is being implemented by a protocol signed within Gabon, between the Gabonese Ministry of Forestry Economy, the Governorate of the Woleu-Ntem Province, Bordamur and the villages in which are directly involved. The protocol acknowledges the interests of conservationists, loggers and local communities on matters relating to hunting and fishing. There is also a management strategy towards hunting activities in the north-eastern periphery of the park between the Ministry of Forestry Economy, the Ministry of Mines, and local representatives.

In 2007, it was reported that a Chinese company had filed to exploit the second-largest iron ore deposit in the world, near the Minkebe National Park. To clear for the mining, it would involve removing a large area of the surrounding forest, and an estimated 350 miles (560 km) of railway, up to 40,000 Chinese laborers, and a hydroelectric dam would be needed to make it possible. This could seriously threaten the future of the conservation area, and the WWF are working with the Chinese and other mining companies in Gabon to attempt to provide a solution.

== Wildlife ==
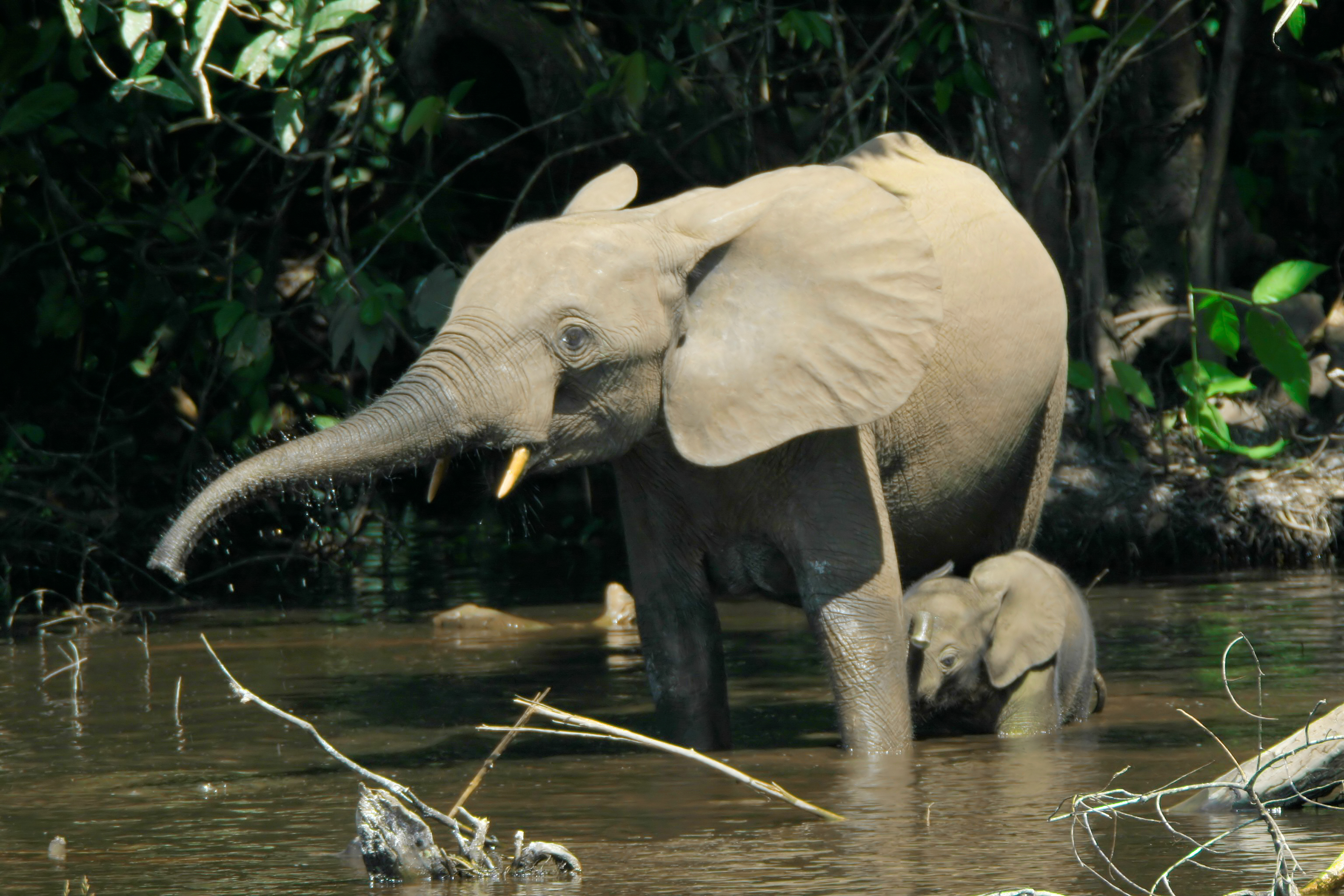
The forest elephant population is believed by the WWF to be one of the largest in Africa

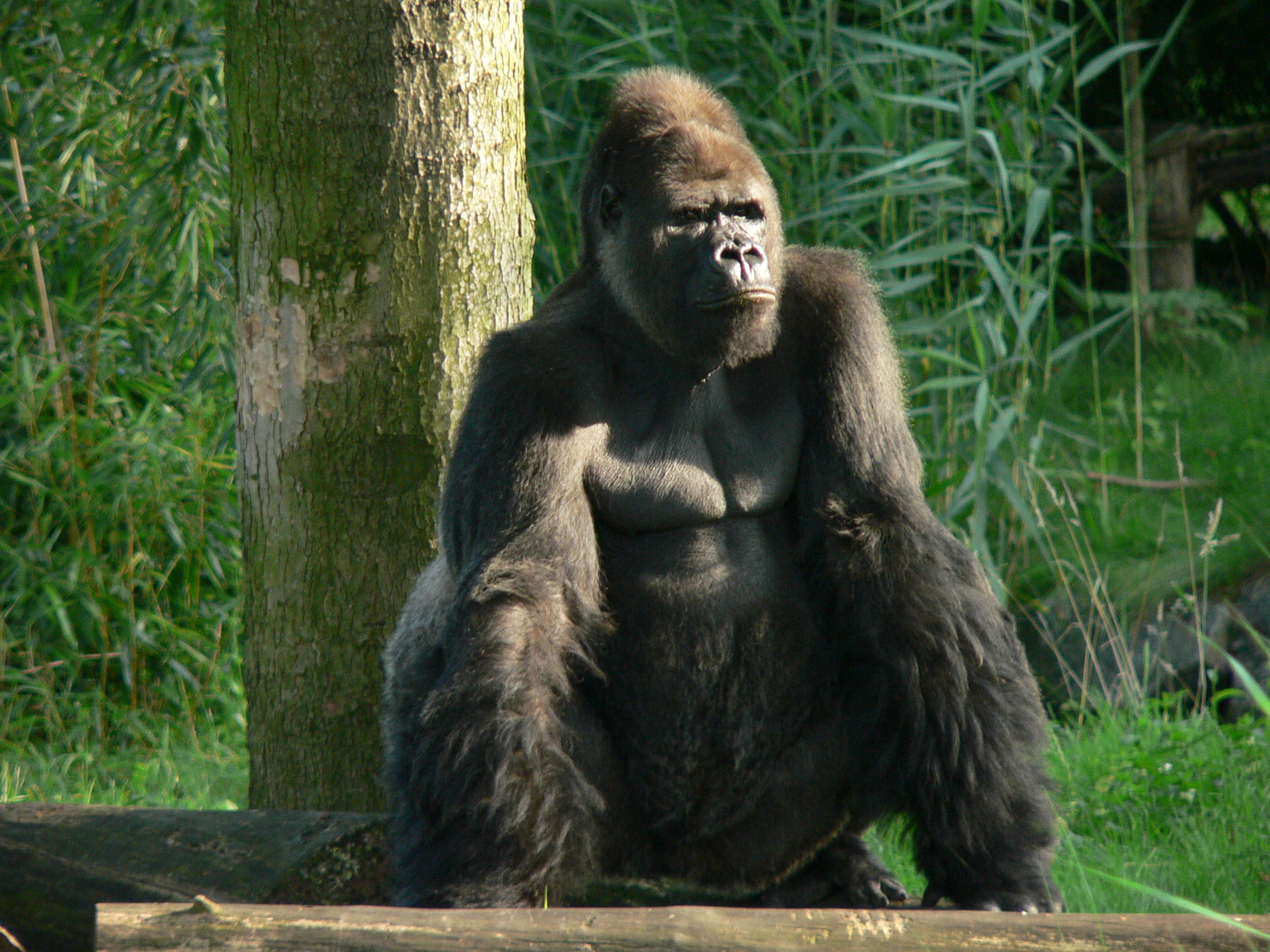
The western lowland gorilla in the park has been listed in the IUCN Red List

The forest elephant is particularly important to the park and is believed by the WWF to contain one of the largest populations in Africa. The lesser forest in the park is inhabited by elephants, gorillas, and various small carnivores, porcupines, squirrels, african golden cats, leopards, giant pangolins, duikers and red river hog. The primary forest is inhabited by creatures such as mandrill, black colobus and chimpanzee. The western lowland gorilla, chimpanzee, black colobus, mandrill and golden potto have all been listed on the IUCN Red List.

The riparian areas of the Minkébé forest provide for creatures who require a water habitat, including the dwarf crocodile, spotted-necked otter, crested mangabey, sitatunga, and water chevrotain. The swampy areas interspersed with vegetation also include habitat for parrots and pythons. The park contains some animals which are rare in Gabon including the bongo and the giant forest hog.

Birds, including the spot-breasted ibis and Rachel's malimbe (Malimbus racheliae), are numerous. The park has been designated an Important Bird Area (IBA) by BirdLife International because it supports significant populations of many bird species.

== See also ==
- List of national parks of Gabon
