= Akanda National Park =

National park in Gabon

- IUCN category II (national park)
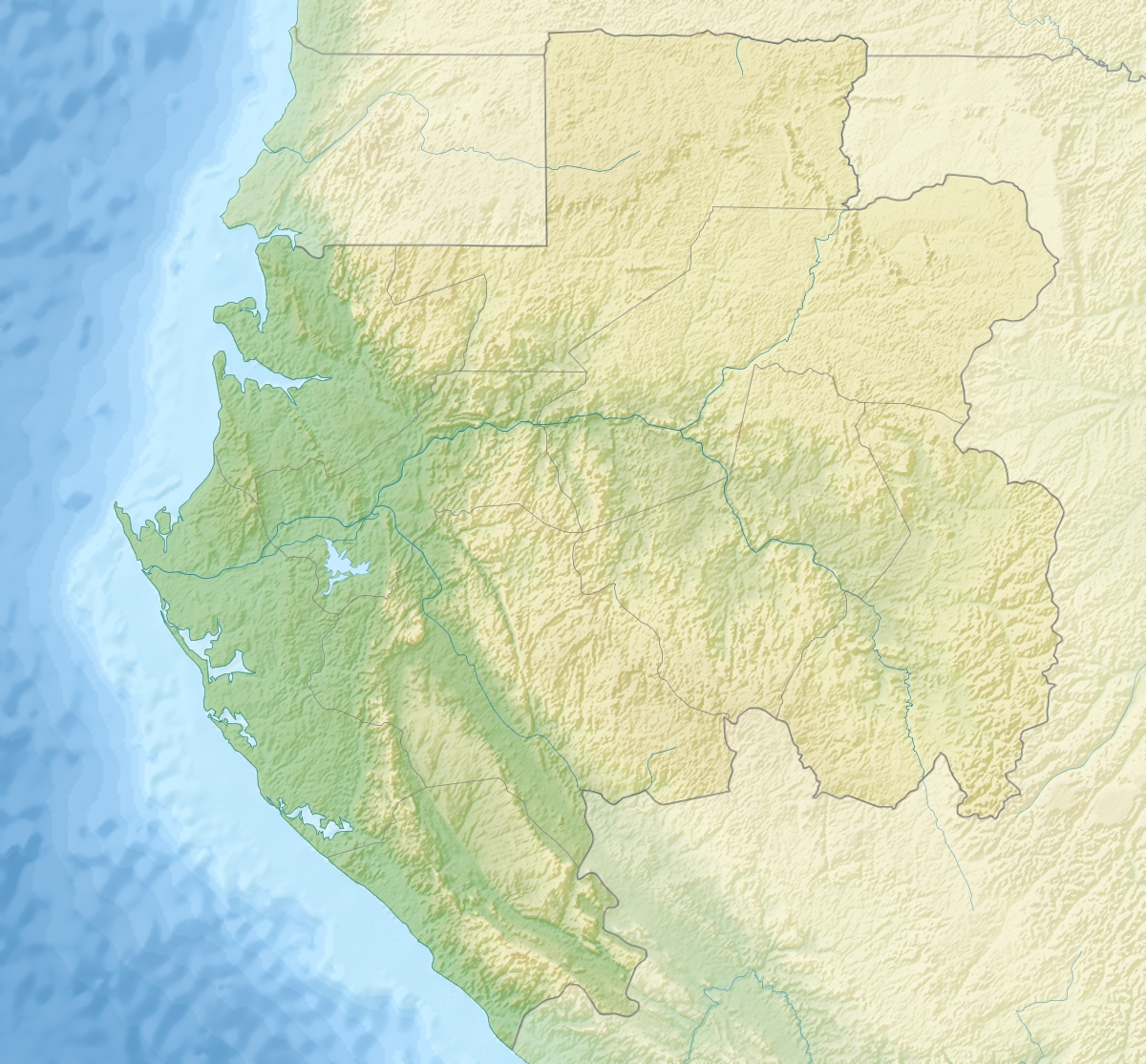
- Location within Gabon
- Location: Gabon
- Nearest city: Libreville
- Coordinates: 0°37′N 9°33′E
- Area: 540 km^{2} (210 sq mi)
- Established: 2002
- Governing body: National Agency for National Parks

Ramsar Wetland
- Official name: Parc National Akanda
- Designated: 2 February 2007
- Reference no.: 1652

Akanda National Park (French: Parc national d'Akanda) is located just north of Libreville, Gabon's capital city. It is also one of 13 National Parks in Gabon set up in 2002 by President Omar Bongo after a two-year study by the Directorate of Widlife and Hunting, WCS and WWF. The 13 national parks are designed to represent the biodiversity of the country and encourage tourism. Akanda National Park is located in the north-west of the country, near Libreville, with coastline along the Mondah and Corisco bays.

== Environment ==
The national park is composed chiefly of mangrove and tidal beach habitats. Gabon has only 2.5% of the total mangrove swamp in Africa, but Akanda together with the nearby Pongara National Park comprise 25% of the total protected mangrove in the continent. They play an important role in the ecosystem and help stabilise the coastline around Libreville. Human encroachment from both building and crop planting are a threat to both parks.

Both of the bays are rich in marine life, and Corisco bay provides an important feeding area for turtles. Akanda is internationally important as a site for migratory birds and is home to the largest populations of such birds in Gabon. The site has been designated an Important Bird Area (IBA) by BirdLife International because it supports significant populations of many bird species.
