= Moukalaba-Doudou National Park =

National park in Gabon

- IUCN category II (national park)
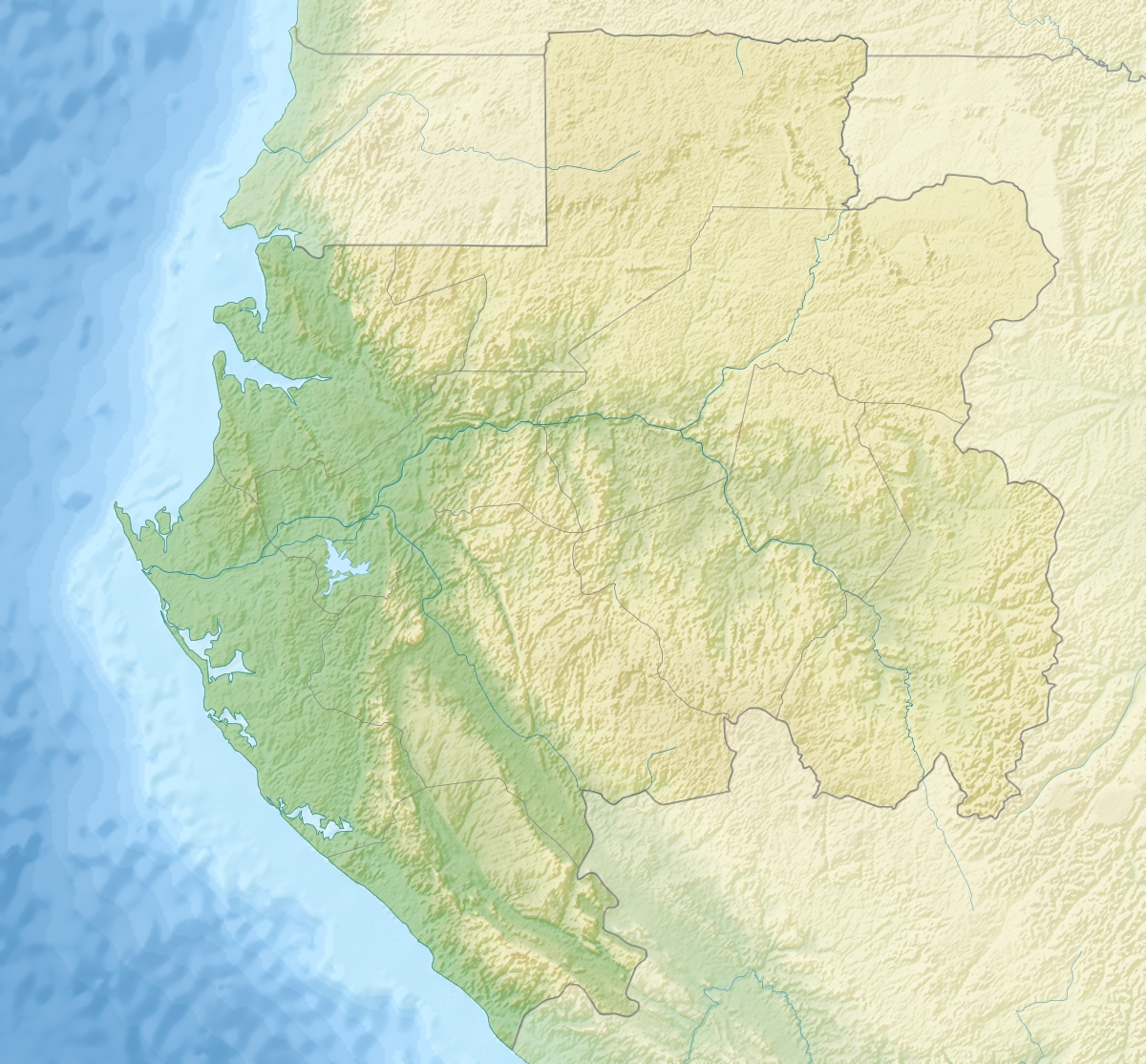
- Location within Gabon
- Location: Nyanga, Ogooué-Maritime, Gabon
- Coordinates: 2°26′S 10°25′E
- Area: 4,500 km^{2} (1,700 mi^{2})
- Governing body: National Agency for National Parks

Moukalaba-Doudou National Park (French: Parc national de Moukalaba-Doudou) is a national park in Gabon. It covers an area of 4,500 km^{2} (1,700 mi^{2}). The national park includes various habitat types, including humid rain forest and savannah grasslands.

The World Wildlife Fund started a development programme in the park in 1996.

== World Heritage Status ==
This site was added to the UNESCO World Heritage Tentative List on October 20, 2005, in the Mixed (Cultural & Natural) category.
