= Lopé National Park =

National park in Gabon

- IUCN category II (national park)
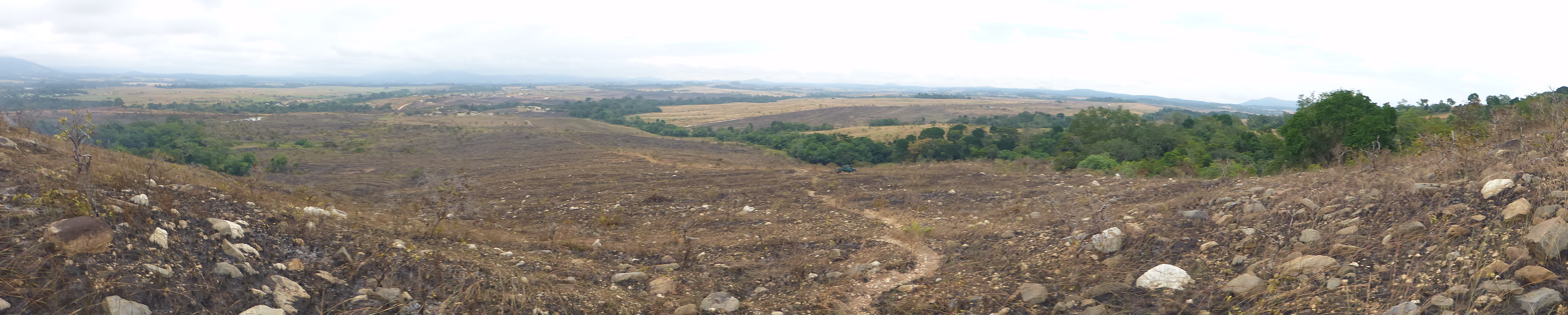
- Panorama of the northern savanna-dominated part Lopé National Park, shortly after the annual burning of the grasses
- Interactive map of Lopé National Park
- Location: Gabon
- Coordinates: 0°30′00″S 11°30′00″E
- Area: 4,910 km^{2} (1,900 sq mi)
- Established: 2002
- Governing body: National Agency for National Parks

UNESCO World Heritage Site
- Official name: Ecosystem and Relict Cultural Landscape of Lopé-Okanda
- Type: Mixed
- Criteria: iii, iv, ix, x
- Designated: 2007 (31st session)
- Reference no.: 1147
- Region: Africa

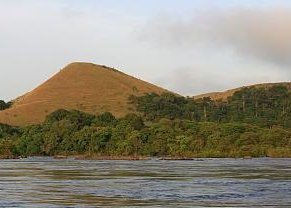
Lopé and the Ogooué River.

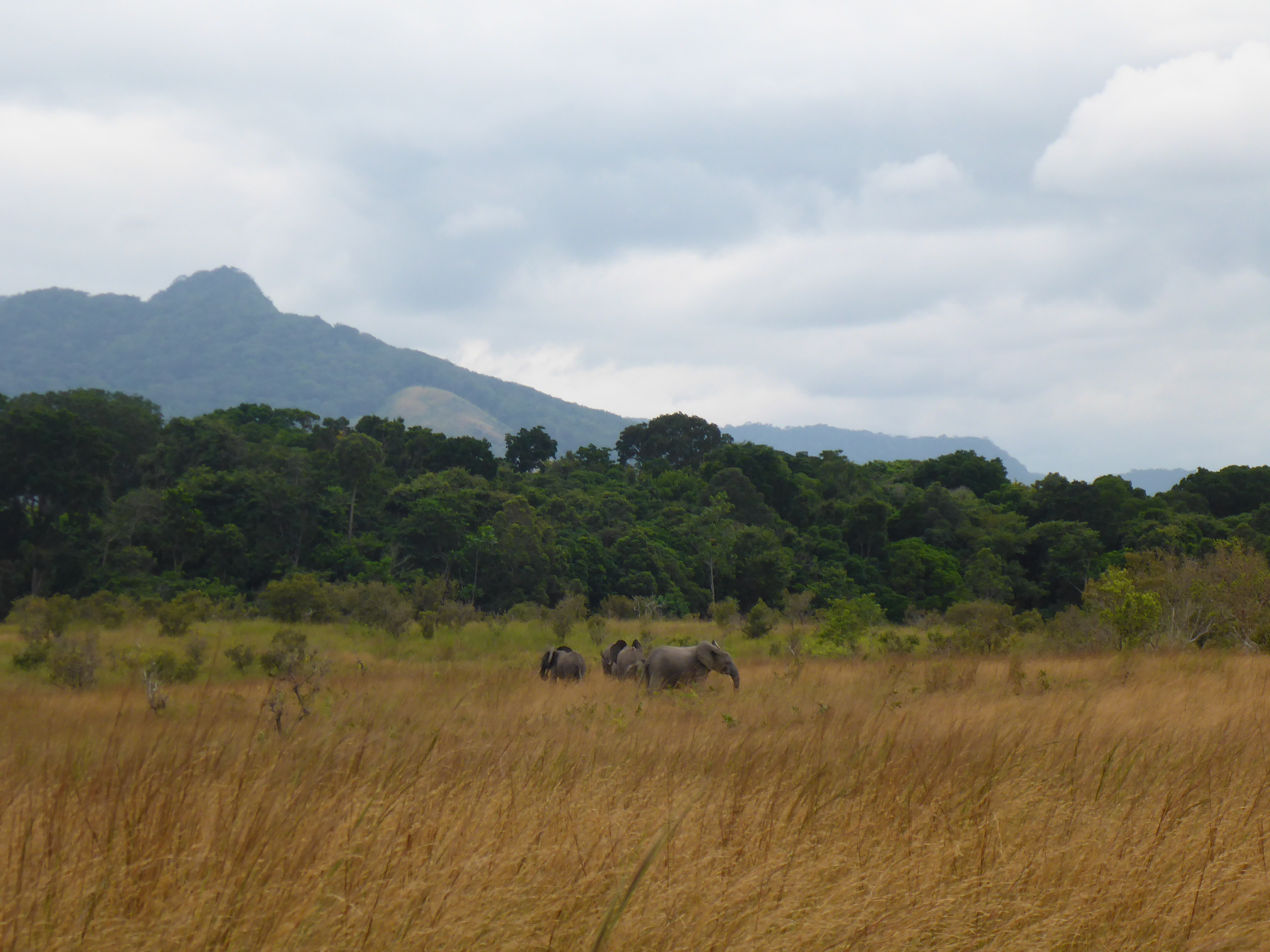
Forest elephants in park savannah

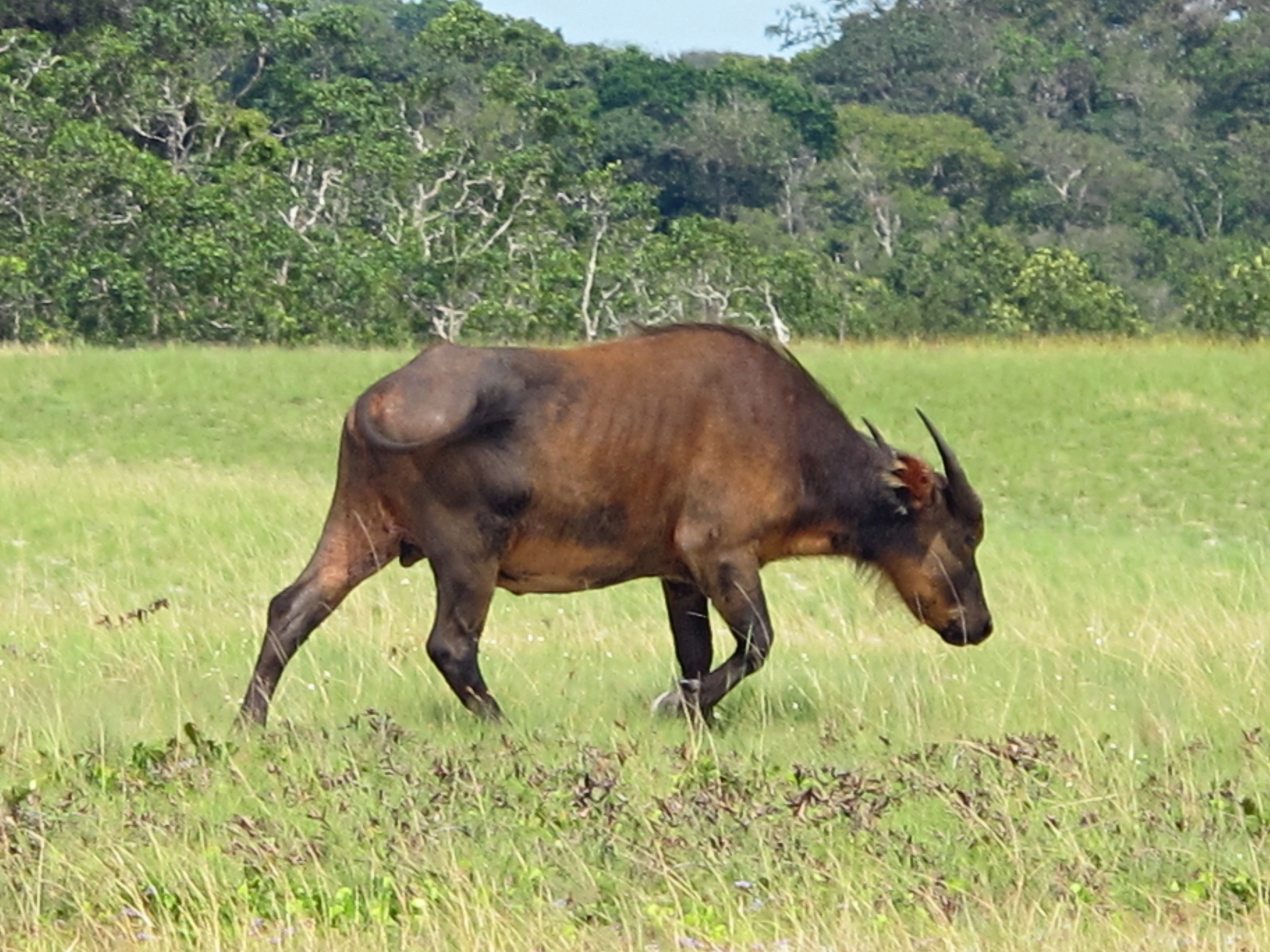
Forest buffalo

Lopé National Park (French: Parc national de la Lopé) is a national park in central Gabon. Bordered by the Ogooué River to the north and the Chaillu Massif to the south, the park has an area of 4,912 km^{2} (1,897 sq mi).

== History ==
Lopé National Park and its surroundings contain evidence of almost continual human occupation over the last 400,000 years. The Ogooué River Valley is much less forested than its surroundings, making an open landscape that may have been used as a corridor and migration route from the coast to the interior of Africa. The oldest Stone Age tools currently known were discovered at Elarmékora in the central region of the valley, in addition to several other Stone Age archeological sites.

In the Neolithic, between 3,500 and 2,000 years ago, the Bantu people may have used the valley during the Bantu expansion, leaving behind remains of polished stone axes and pottery. During that time, small villages were constructed on the hilltops with large rubbish pits.

Later, when iron-working appeared in the valley around 2,000 years ago, the hilltop villages became larger, with nearby iron furnaces, and agriculture began to flourish. Although over 1600 petroglyphs have been discovered dating from around the time of the beginning of iron-working, it appears that the valley was abandoned sometime between 600 and 1200 AD, before being repopulated by the present-day Okanda people in the 14th and 15th centuries.

The park was the first protected area in Gabon when the Lopé-Okanda Wildlife Reserve was created in 1946, and in 2007, the national park and surrounding Lopé-Okanda landscape were added to the World Heritage List by UNESCO because of its biodiversity, unique savanna-forest transitional zone, and the spectacular petroglyphs in the region.

== Ecology ==
Lopé National Park has dry weather compared to the rest of Gabon, being located in the rain shadow of the Chaillu Massif. In addition, there is a band of low rainfall along the Ogooué River. As a result, the landscape contains a complex mosaic of dense tropical rainforests and savannas. Although the terrain is mostly monsoon forest, in the north the park contains the last remnants of grass savannas created in Central Africa during the last ice age, 15,000 years ago. The transition zone between the two habitats has shifted since the last ice age, with the rainforest expanding into the savanna, although the dry climate has allowed the savanna ecosystem to persist in the north of the park.

=== Flora and fauna ===
Because of the complex environment, the national park contains unusually high biodiversity across many taxa. Over 1,550 plant species have been recorded to date, with many regions of the park yet to be explored fully.

In a survey of land snails in the park, 74 species were found from 12 different families.

The park also provides critical habitat for the leopard, protecting healthy populations of its prey species including the red river hog, African forest buffalo, and cane rat. Other mammal species found in the part include the endangered giant pangolin and tree pangolin, often sharing nests with microbats.

The park includes one of the world's largest concentrations of primates in the wild (over 1000 individuals) and the only significant populations of sun-tailed monkey in a protected area in the world. The density of forest elephants in the northern part of the site is seasonally among the highest in the world (1.5/km²).

The park has been designated an Important Bird Area (IBA) by BirdLife International because it supports significant populations of many bird species.

== Tourism and conservation ==
The park contains a small research station, named as Mikongo and run by the Zoological Society London, based in the village known as Mikongo, from which it gets its name. There exists infrastructure to cater for tourists at the base, including several chalets and a large open air dining room, from which the rainforest is only five metres away. The park also hosts CEDAMM Training Centre, a Wildlife Conservation Society-run international conservation education center.

Because of global climate change, the dense forest ecosystem is expanding into the savanna ecosystem in the north, leading to the loss of habitat diversity in the park. As a result, annual controlled burns of the savanna have been conducted in the park to reduce the encroachment of the forest vegetation and to provide the required vegetation for the diet of the forest buffalo.
