= Birougou National Park =

National park in Gabon

- IUCN category II (national park)
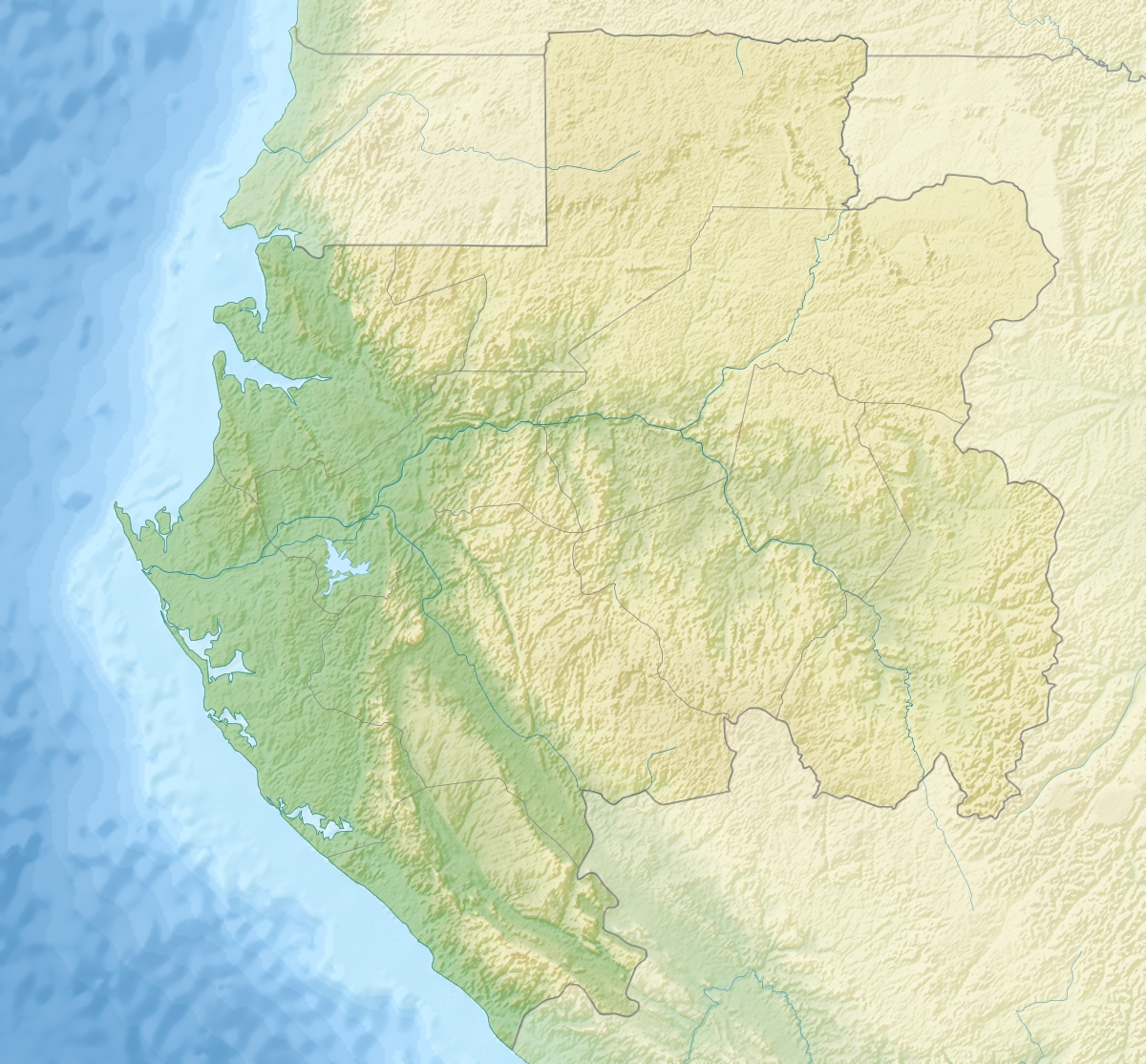
- Location within Gabon
- Location: Gabon
- Coordinates: 1°46′S 12°16′E
- Area: 690 km^{2} (270 sq mi)
- Established: 2002
- Governing body: National Agency for National Parks

Ramsar Wetland
- Official name: Site Ramsar des Monts Birougou
- Designated: 2 February 2007
- Reference no.: 1654

Birougou National Park, also known as the Monts Birougou Wetlands (French: Marais des monts Birougou) is a national park in central Gabon. It contains extremely dense rain forest in the Chaillu Mountains and is one of the two parks where the endemic sun-tailed guenon, a monkey first described in 1988, can be found. It is named after Mount Birougou,1.83816°S 12.31702°E, 975 metres in altitude, one of the highest peaks in the country.

Due to its purported universal cultural and natural significance, it was added onto the UNESCO World Heritage Tentative List on October 20, 2005. Portions of the park have been designated as a Ramsar site since 2007.
