= Iguela Hunting Area =

Hunting area in gabon

The Iguela Hunting Area is a Hunting Area in Gabon. It was established in 1966 and covers 798.16 square kilometres (308.17 sq mi).

This reserve belongs to group IV according to the IUCN classification.
