= Niger Delta mangroves =

Nigeria has extensive mangrove forests in the coastal region of the Niger Delta. Considered one of the most ecologically sensitive regions in the world, the Niger Delta mangrove forest is situated within a deltaic depositional environment. These mangrove forests serve a critical role in regional ecological and landscape composition, and support subsistence gathering practices, and market-based income opportunities.

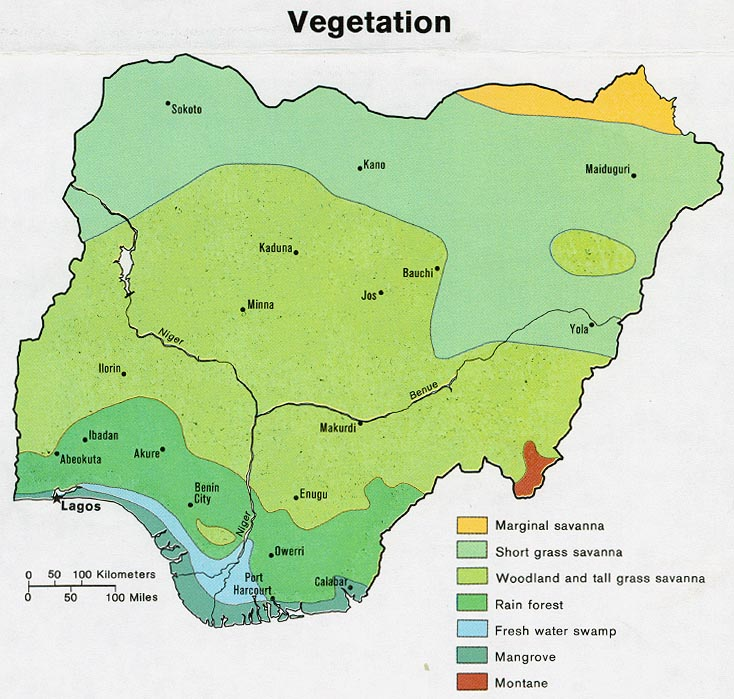
Map of Nigeria's vegetation zones

== Overview ==
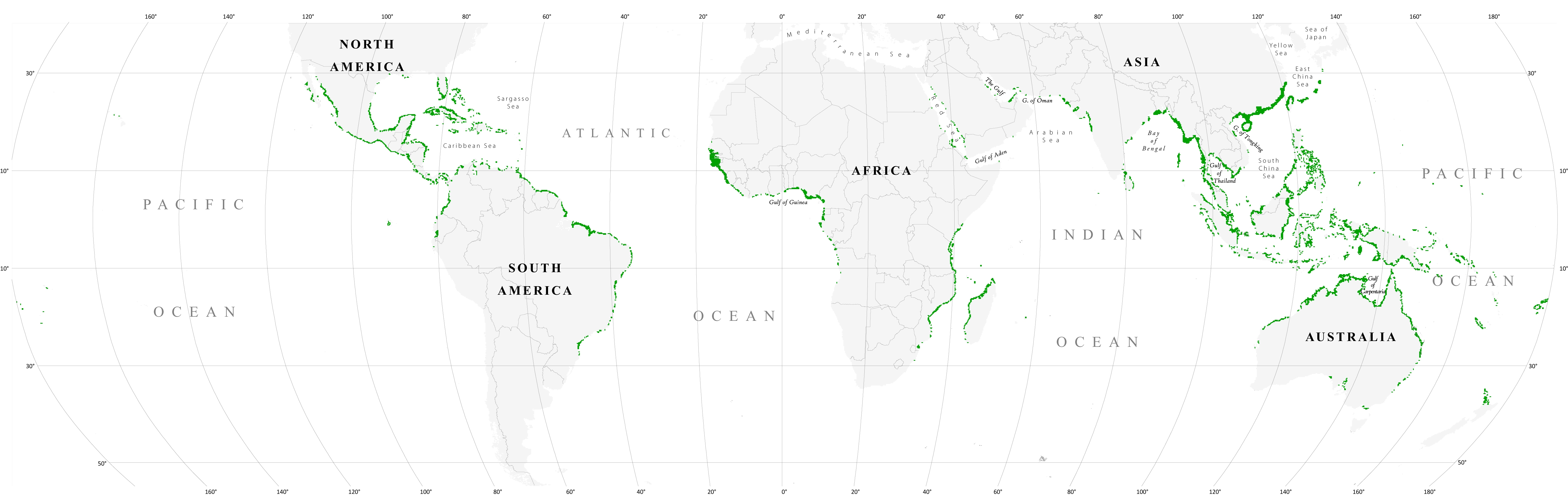
World map of mangrove distribution

Mangrove forests are found in 118 countries and territories worldwide, 75% of mangrove vegetation zones are located in intertidal tropic and sub-tropic habitats situated between 25° N and 25° S . Typically surrounding salient river deltas, mangrove regions support a variety of halophytes. These robust shrubs and trees, which have adapted to changing coastal conditions (such as inundation, sun exposure, anaerobic soil, and salinity concentration), play a substantive role in cultivating the biodiversity and wellbeing of the surrounding landscape.

The Niger Delta mangrove is the third largest in the world and the largest in Africa. Since the 1960s oil and gas exploration has become an important economic activity, resulting in significant alteration of the landscape via pollution, urbanization and invasion.

African mangroves have faced significant challenges in recent times, experiencing substantial losses. The decline, devastation, and deterioration of mangrove forests can be linked to several factors such as urbanization, quarrying, salt and sand extraction, pollution from industries and agro-industrial chemicals, as well as petroleum and gas exploitation. Additionally, the absence of adequate legislation and deforestation for fish smoking contribute to this issue. The mangrove forest zone in Nigeria not only enhances the socio-economic prosperity of rural coastal communities but also holds promise in shielding them from severe weather occurrences intensified by climate change. The anticipated rise in sea levels is expected to heighten flooding in coastal areas at lower altitudes, subsequently amplifying the physical and socio-economic susceptibilities of coastal urban centers. Nigeria has been acknowledged as one of the most susceptible African nations to climate change, and its impacts are currently manifesting in various regions of the country.

In Nigeria, there are more than 2,000 industrial facilities, with approximately 80% of them concentrated in the coastal areas, particularly in urban hubs like Lagos, Port Harcourt, and nearby regions. The industries in Nigeria's coastal zone encompass a range of sectors including oil and gas, petrochemicals, iron and steel, fertilizer plants, aluminum smelting plants, as well as diverse manufacturing industries such as textiles, food processing, plastics, pharmaceuticals, cement production, soap and detergent manufacturing, paint production, brewing, and wood pulp and paper production.

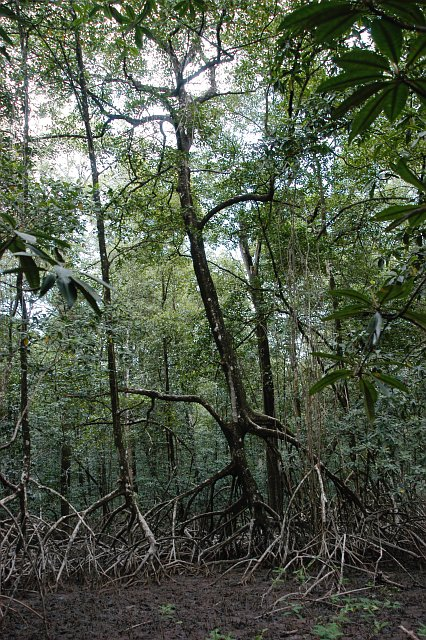
Rhizophora racemosa

== Biological composition ==
Biologically, six mangrove species make up these forests, including three species in the family Rhizophoraceae (Rhizophora racemosa (red mangrove; tall), Rhizophora harrisonii (red mangrove; dwarf), Rhizophora mangle (red mangrove; dwarf)), and species in the family Avicenniaceae (white mangrove) and Combretaceae. Of these species, Rhizophora racemosa occupies the greatest density of the forest, accounting for approximately 90% of all mangrove biota. Despite expansive geographic coverage, the Niger Delta mangrove forest has approximately 80% of its vegetation distributed in three states (Bayelsa, Delta, and River states).

Although the forest is composed of six mangrove species, mangrove growth is primarily situated in brackish muddy creek banks. Studies have indicated that Rhizophora racemosa (which is the tallest mangrove species) reaches its optimized growth potential when exposed to brackish water and soft mud, whereas R. racemosa's relatives, R. mangle and R. harrisonii, favor higher salinity and hard mud. In its natural state, mangrove soil or "chikoko" (a mixture of acid sulphate, silty clay, clay loam and peat), has a pH of 4 and 6 for mangroves inhabiting low-tide and high-tide locations, respectively. If salinity levels shift too much from these levels, mudflats become unsuitable for mangrove production, and the process of mangrove reforestation (from infertile mangrove land to productive mangrove mudflat) can take upwards of one century.

== Distribution of mangroves in Nigeria ==
In the coastal areas of Nigeria, the mangrove forest is distributed as follows:

- Lagos, a coastal area in Nigeria, has a total expanse of 42.20 square kilometers. Within this area, specifically 3.13 square kilometers, are designated as forest reserves. This portion within the forest reserves represents 7.42% of the overall area of Lagos. Essentially, this signifies that a small but significant part of Lagos is designated as a forest reserve, contributing to the preservation and conservation of the region's natural habitats and ecosystems.
- In Ogun, a region in Nigeria, the total area covered by mangroves is 12.18 square kilometers. Interestingly, unlike some other areas, there are no mangrove areas specifically designated within forest reserves in this region. This implies that all the mangroves in Ogun are in non-reserve areas, lacking the protective designation of a forest reserve. This situation could have implications for conservation efforts and suggests that mangrove preservation and management in Ogun may need to rely on other forms of protection and sustainability initiatives beyond designated reserves.
- In the region of Ondo, Nigeria, mangroves cover an area of 40.62 square kilometers. However, unlike some other regions where mangroves may be allocated within forest reserves for protection and management, Ondo does not have any mangrove areas designated within forest reserves. This means that all the mangroves in Ondo are situated outside of the officially designated forest reserve areas. This lack of mangroves within forest reserves can influence the conservation and management approach for these important ecosystems in Ondo. Preserving mangroves in this region would likely necessitate alternative strategies and efforts aimed at safeguarding them outside of formal reserve designations. It underscores the importance of comprehensive conservation measures and sustainable practices to ensure the continued health and vitality of the mangroves in Ondo.
- In the Edo/Delta region of Nigeria, the mangrove forest area covers a substantial 3,470.32 square kilometers. Within this extensive area, 143.75 square kilometers of mangroves are located within designated forest reserves. This signifies that approximately 4.14% of the total mangrove area is officially protected within these forest reserves. Having a portion of the mangrove area within forest reserves is vital for their preservation and sustainable management. The forest reserves serve as protected zones where activities detrimental to the mangroves, such as indiscriminate logging or habitat destruction, are regulated or prohibited. This helps maintain the ecological balance and the diverse array of flora and fauna that depend on mangrove ecosystems.
- In the Rivers/Bayelsa region of Nigeria, the mangrove forest area spans a vast 5,435.96 square kilometers. Within this extensive expanse, 90.62 square kilometers of mangroves are designated within forest reserves. This indicates that approximately 1.67% of the total mangrove area is safeguarded within these specific forest reserves.
- In the Cross River/Akwa Ibom region, the mangrove forest spans an expansive area of 721.86 square kilometers, and within this expanse, 67.19 square kilometers fall under the protection of forest reserves, accounting for a notable 9.31%. Altogether, considering all regions, the total mangrove forest area amounts to an impressive 9,723.14 square kilometers, with 304.69 square kilometers nestled within designated forest reserves.

== Socio-ecological vitality ==
The Niger Delta mangrove forests play critical roles for 60% of local peoples who rely on the land and sea for survival. The forests contribute local therapeutic, amenity, heritage, spiritual, and existence values. Responses from a survey conducted in 2007 and 2008 evaluating mangrove social value in three Niger Delta communities indicated approximately 85% of participant households had previously utilized mangrove vegetation as a medicinal remedy and between 65% and 71% of villagers recognized the mangrove forests as a place of repose. The Niger Delta mangrove forests directly (through raw materials) and indirectly (through forest-based products) offer economically beneficial resources for Nigerian rural and urban communities alike, with eight out of the ten most lucrative vocations dependent on thriving mangrove populations. These occupations include canoe carving, logging, timber harvesting, building, fishing, sawmilling, traditional medicine, and trading.

== Threats to mangrove survival ==
There are many environmental threats to the mangrove forests in the Niger Delta.

Oil extraction is the largest threat to Nigeria's mangrove forests. Comprising 97 percent of Nigeria's total exports, the oil-rich Niger Delta produces up to two million barrels of crude oil a day, which has placed Nigeria as the 9th oil producing country in the world. Such extensive oil extraction has come at great environmental and social cost. Since 1958, the Nigerian Federal Ministry of Environment has estimated 13 million barrels of oil have been spilled during extraction processes. These spills are the product of many factors, which include: unenforced drilling regulations, refinery leaks, pipeline corrosion, vandalism, and human error. The total number of annual spills has gradually increased since 1958, from approximately 250 spills per year to 500 spills per year. The Nigerian Oil Industry, which primarily extracts oil amongst the Niger Delta mangrove forests, has consequently deforested mangrove ecological zones for drilling purposes, and deteriorated the health of the surrounding mangroves. Petroleum has toxicological impacts on mangrove trees, but also causes direct physical damage. The toxic effects of both surface-level and sediment deposit oil exposure on mangrove health has been repeatedly scientifically documented. In 1986, scientists analyzing the impact of the Bahía las Minas oil spill on coastal vegetation reported clusters of dying mangroves in proximity to where oil had washed ashore. On average, studies revealed mangrove fatality rates were highest during the first six-months of a spill; thus, fresh crude oil spills had greater toxicity than "weathered" oil. Other natural experiments noted that factors such as mangrove exposure to water currents and spill contamination control plays a substantive role in predicting the extent of oil damage on a mangrove population. Oil contact with mangrove seedlings also revealed extensive damage; when placed in the presence of crude, greater than 96 percent of mangrove seedlings died.

Petroleum, which comprises hydrocarbon compound contaminants such as PAHs (Polycyclic aromatic hydrocarbons), has been connected to plant chlorophyll damage. As a result of PAH root absorption, mangrove leaf pigmentation is altered, limiting photosynthesis. Regardless of oil toxicity or soil absorption capacity, mangroves can be fatally damaged from surface-oil spills as oil coats cells that allow oxygen to reach the roots, resulting in oxygen deprivation and incapacity of necessary biological processes.

Historically, petroleum's detrimental impact on delta biodiversity (including threatening mangrove existence) has sparked non-violent and violent citizen responses. Communities facing threats to health, livelihoods and prosperity from the economic, environmental, and structural injustice resulting from local oil extraction have reacted together to fight for the indigenous right to existence and Niger Delta resource autonomy. While some movements such as the Movement for the Survival of the Ogoni People (MOSOP) relayed demands through non-violent protest, other organizations have responded to repeated degradative practices and governmentally unenforced industry regulations through violence. Established in 2006, the Movement for the Emancipation of the Niger Delta (MEND) is a rebel militant group challenging wealth polarization, environmental disregard, and economic instability brought about by delta oil production. Through monkeywrenching industry equipment, blowing-up pipelines, and kidnapping oil workers, MEND seeks to fracture Nigeria's oil economy. Despite justifying their violent actions by the need to obtain justice, MEND is recognized by various international governing bodies as a terrorist organization.

In addition to mangrove degradation from regional oil extraction practices, mass deforestation has threatened Niger Delta mangrove populations. A study published in 2011 by Oluseyi Fabiyi revealed that anthropogenic development was the chief agent driving deforestation in Southwestern Nigeria. These anthropogenic factors included agricultural growth and urban expansion. Fabiyi argued these variables led to greater deforestation rates than forest clearing resulting from oil extraction.

In a GIS analysis of deforestation patterns of Niger Delta wetlands conducted by Glory Enaruvbe and Ozien Atafo in 2014, water body area in the target location decreased by 7 percent in 11 years (between 2002 and 2013), and forest area decreased by four percent. Enaruvbe and Atafo noted that locals' perceptions of economic opportunity and increased demand for ecological services guided increased deforestation patterns.

== Causes of mangrove deforestation in Niger Delta Region ==
Numerous elements contribute to the depletion and deterioration of the mangrove forest within the Niger Delta Region of Nigeria. These encompass reclaiming land for constructing settlements, establishing fish farms, building roads and electrical infrastructure, timber logging, gathering fuelwood, engaging in oil exploration/exploitation, along with activities linked to it, improper waste disposal, and the invasion of Nypa fruticans.

=== Infrastructure development ===
The development of infrastructure stands as a primary factor driving mangrove deforestation in the Niger Delta Region of Nigeria. In recent times, particularly with the establishment of the Niger Delta Development Commission (NDDC) after extensive years of advocating against the marginalization of the Niger Delta Region (where Nigeria's primary crude oil reserves are located), endeavors to enhance infrastructure have been initiated. However, these initiatives occasionally lead to mangrove destruction. Land reclamation for residential and public infrastructure construction represents a significant danger to the mangrove ecosystem in the Niger Delta region of Nigeria. In various regions of the area, mangrove forests are being cleared to make way for housing and public amenities, such as schools, especially in mangrove areas adjacent to access roads.

=== Fish farming ===
Massive fish farming operations constitute a significant factor contributing to the deforestation and degradation of mangroves in the Niger Delta region of Nigeria. An illustrative instance is evident in Buguma, Rivers State, where ONIDA, an Israeli company, engages in extensive fish farming. The establishment of this fish farm, boasting over forty ponds, resulted in the devastation and filling of a substantial area of the mangrove forest, crucial for the livelihoods of the local population. The primary motivation for situating the farm near the mangrove is to ensure a consistent supply of brackish water necessary for cultivating the targeted fish species, particularly the Barramundi, which is cultivated and imported from Australia. However, the overall contributions of such endeavors to the rural economy, considering the importation of nearly all farm necessities, including fish feed from Israel or Australia, raise significant questions.

=== Timber and fuel wood gathering ===
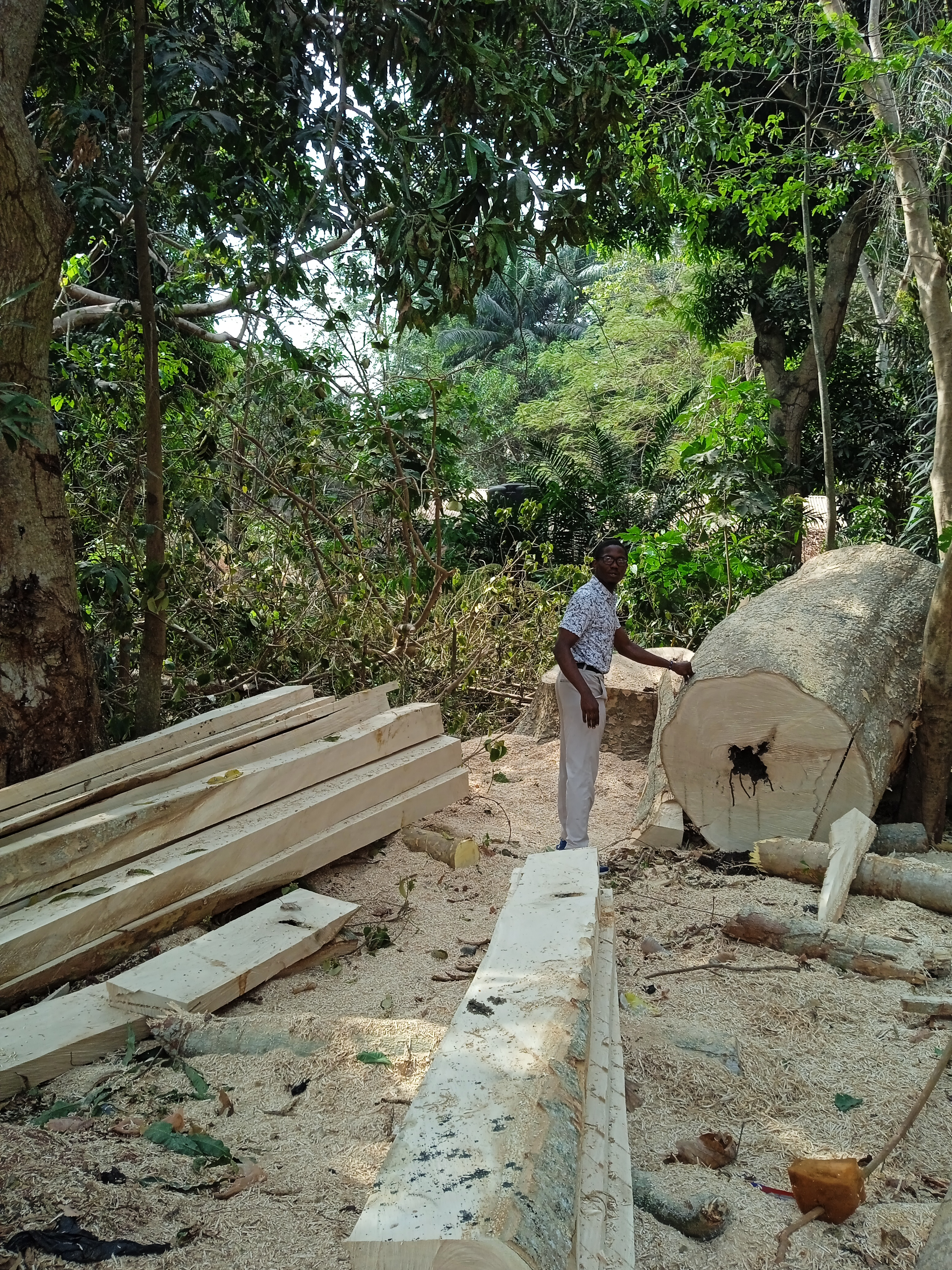
Fuel Wood Gathering in Nigeria Leading to Deforestation

The mangrove forest serves as a timber source, with its species being extensively utilized as fuel for small-scale industrial boilers due to their high thermal capacity. The red mangrove, specifically Rhizophora racemosa, stands as the most heavily exploited species, employed for various purposes including firewood, poles, and timber. The escalating demand for fuelwood prompts the depletion of mangroves in multiple regions of the Niger Delta, driven by the necessity to fulfill household energy requirements and generate income.

=== Oil exploration/exploitation and related activities ===
The oil and gas industry significantly contributes to mangrove fragmentation, deforestation, and degradation in the Niger Delta. Activities such as oil drilling, spillage, dredging of canals, and the construction of housing for oil workers pose substantial threats to the survival and effective functioning of the mangrove ecosystem in this region. Oil spills and leakages have inflicted significant damage on Nigeria's mangrove areas, affecting not only the mangroves themselves but also the fishing economy and overall water quality.

=== Nipa palm ===
Nypa fruticans (Nipa palm) – an invasive alien species, is another major threat to the mangrove ecosystem in the Niger Delta Region. The species which was introduced in Nigeria for the control of riverbank erosion has become a big menace to the mangrove ecosystem. The deforestation and degradation of the mangroves for firewood gathering, the construction of navigational canals, villages, and the activities of oil companies, encourage their replacement by this fast colonizer (Nypa fruticans) which does not provide the enormous ecological services provided by mangroves. Tackling the menace of Nipa palm invasion of the mangrove ecosystem requires a holistic approach that will discourage mangrove deforestation and degradation, complete removal of the species in invaded areas, and massive regeneration of degraded mangroves. The Secretariat of the Convention on Biological Diversity observed that restoration of degraded habitats in addition to reintroduction of native species can enhance biological diversity and also enhance the resilience of ecosystems against future invasions. Efforts should also be made towards discovering other uses of the Nipa palm that will be beneficial to man.

=== Other factors ===
Defecation, improper waste disposal, and the unsustainable use of non-timber resources are additional contributors to mangrove degradation in the Niger Delta region. Instances of constructing public toilets that discharge waste directly into the mangroves and disposing of waste in their vicinity have become prevalent in the area. Equally concerning is the unsustainable utilization of non-timber resources such as fish, periwinkle, crab, and others.

A significant factor contributing to the loss and deterioration of mangrove forests in the Niger Delta is the noticeable inadequacy in enforcing the environmental impact assessment (EIA) regulations. Often, projects are carried out prior to conducting the EIA, and even when the assessment is conducted before project execution, the process is frequently marred by irregularities tolerated by representatives of pertinent agencies responsible for ensuring due process and upholding standards. In certain instances, approval is granted for projects with substantial potential negative environmental impacts. In the Niger Delta Region, multinational oil corporations frequently evade accountability for pollution and spills, particularly in marine and coastal ecosystems, unlike the stringent regulations observed in many developed countries. Strict adherence to and rigorous compliance with the stipulations of the EIA regulations are imperative for ensuring sustainable development.

== Conservation efforts ==
Despite exploitation, fragmentation, and degradation, no policy has been enacted in Nigeria with the sole purpose to conserve endangered mangrove forests. Although neither federal or state institutions have ratified protection efforts, citizens of the Niger Delta states have banded together in attempt to defend the depreciating mangrove populations. One coalition, the Mangrove Forest Conservation Society of Nigeria, established in 1995, has spread its vision of establishing peaceful and sustainable coexistence between regional rural development and mangrove ecosystems across numerous Niger Delta cities (such as Asaba, Benin, Calabar, Lagos, Port Harcourt, Uyo, and Yenegoa).

Unintentionally affecting mangrove conservation, in 1989, the National Policy on Environment was developed in Nigeria. This policy resulted in 14.2% of Nigeria's land mass qualifying as protected area, securing 988 nationally protected reserves and 12 protected areas under international conventions. According to the Nigerian Department of National Parks, the reserves collectively represent a variety of Nigeria's most essential ecological zones; among these signified zones are tropical and wetland forests. Despite federally declaring these 1,000 sites protected, under-regulation and mismanagement has resulted in anthropogenic exploitation of reserve resources. Deforestation has been propelled by demand for bushmeat, timber, and vegetation.

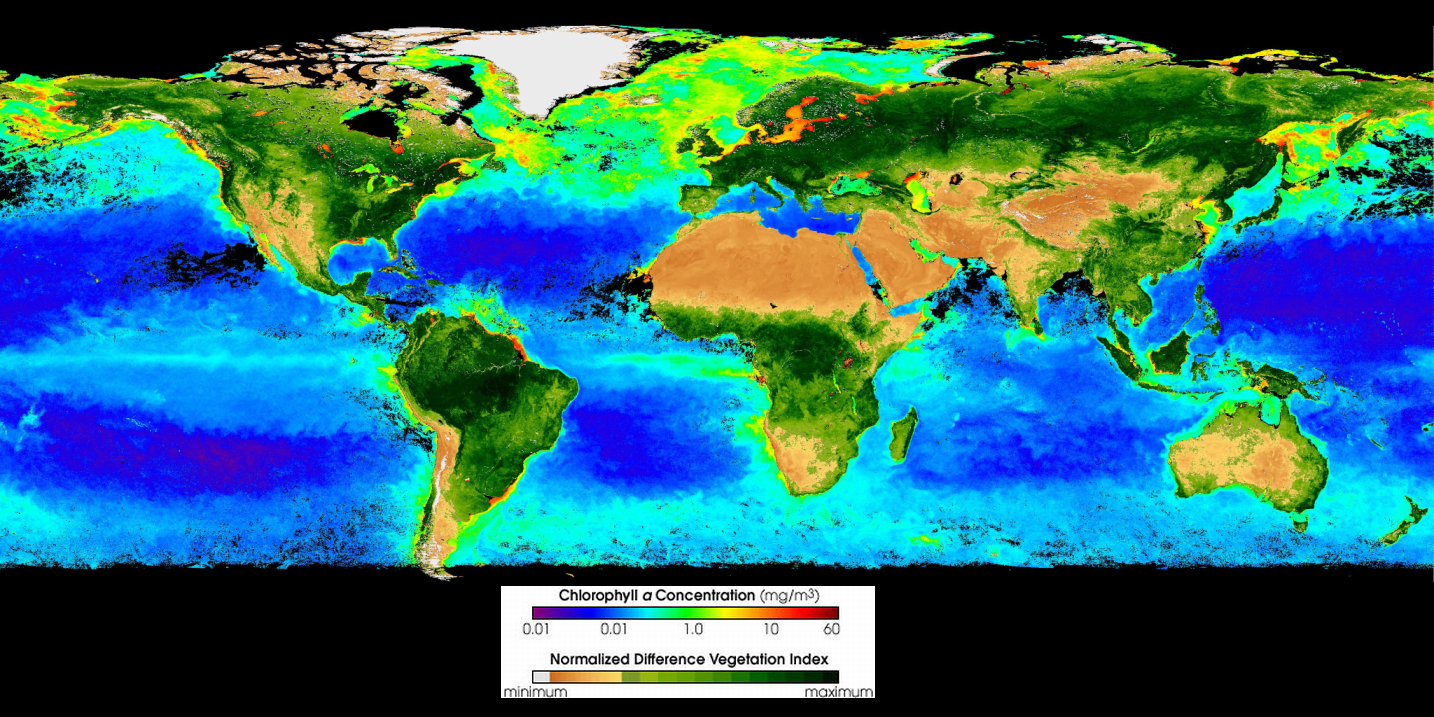
Example of NDVI global biosphere measurement (2002)

Although mangrove conservation policy has yet to be established in Nigeria, published studies have demonstrated the affirmative prospective impact human intervention can have on remediating and protecting mangrove forests. A 2013 GIS study conducted by Oluwagbenga Ol Orimoogunje and Opeyemi Ajibola- James analyzed the recovery capability of oil exposed mangroves in two polluted Niger Delta sites. Both sites contained contaminated areas greater than 20 km ^{2} in size, but one site was remediated whereas the other was not. Mangrove health was monitored for four time periods via RENA and GPS imagery spanning 1986 to 2007. In 1986 (pre-spill), both locations contained a Normalized Difference Vegetation Index (NDVI) value of .32. NDVI, which measures the amount of infrared energy produced by a plant, allowed researchers to determine the health of the mangrove study population based on the infrared levels reflected off the canopy surface. This number served as starting point to determine the quantitative impact oil pollution had on mangrove health. In 2000, six years after the spill, NDVI values had changed. The remediated site contained a NDVI of .30 where the non-remediated site was evaluated at .27. After 2000, NDVI values began to increase in both fields, but the remediated site's NDVI remained higher than the non-remediated site (2007 remediated site had a NDVI of .36 whereas the non-remediated site's was .34). This study suggested that oil caused a decline in vegetation area and health, but that with remediation, health was mostly recovered, compared to sites that were not remediated.

=== Implications for climate change mitigation ===
The crucial role of mangrove forests in mitigating climate change is widely acknowledged globally. These forests are highly carbon-rich among tropical forests, primarily due to their abundant plant production and sedimentation from rivers and tides. Studies have shown that mangroves exceed the annual mean carbon sequestration rates of various terrestrial forest ecosystems, including tropical rainforests, temperate rainforests, and boreal forests. Remarkably, a significant portion of mangroves' carbon, about 50-90%, is stored below ground, providing long-term sequestration. When compared to terrestrial ecosystems, mangroves release more carbon to the atmosphere and oceans when they undergo degradation or conversion to other land uses. For instance, deforestation of mangroves results in substantial carbon emissions, amounting to about 0.02-0.12 Pg carbon per year, approximately 10% of global deforestation emissions, despite mangroves covering only 0.7% of tropical forest area. Consequently, the destruction of mangrove forests in the Niger Delta Region not only releases stored carbon but also diminishes their potential to sequester future carbon.

=== Implications for climate change adaptation ===
It has been well-documented that coastal regions are vulnerable to significant impacts from climate change, including issues like beach and dune erosion caused by rising sea levels, extreme weather events, changes in runoff patterns, and increased flooding. Communities along coastlines worldwide are already witnessing the consequences of these impacts, resulting in extensive damages and losses.

However, mangrove forests and other marine and coastal ecosystems such as seagrass meadows play a vital role in helping coastal areas adapt to the effects of climate change. These ecosystems offer a range of services that aid in climate change adaptation, including the prevention of shoreline erosion, protection against storms and sea-level rise, maintenance of coastal water quality, and the provision of food security for many coastal communities globally. Additionally, they serve to shield adjacent marine ecosystems, including coral reefs, from land-based pollution, while also serving as habitats for various fish and invertebrates, some of which have significant commercial value.

Consequently, the ongoing pace of mangrove deforestation and degradation in the Niger Delta Region, with no efforts towards restoration, will undeniably heighten the susceptibility of coastal communities in the area to extreme weather events. There is substantial evidence from various parts of the world that supports this argument. Instances from nations affected by the 2004 Tsunami affirmed the critical roles mangrove forests played in safeguarding lives and property. The waves infiltrated significantly inland where mangroves and other coastal ecosystems had been decimated, leading to widespread flooding of farms, destruction of homes, and loss of livelihoods. The four countries most severely impacted by the 2004 Tsunami—Indonesia, Sri Lanka, India, and Thailand—saw a 28% reduction in their mangrove forests between 1980 and 2000. It is also widely accepted that the destruction of mangroves and reefs intensified the devastation caused by the 2005 Hurricane Katrina in the coastal states of the United States.

=== Socio-economic implications ===
The economic and social impacts of mangrove deforestation and degradation are significant. While specific figures for Nigeria are not available, according to, mangrove forests contribute an estimated US$33–57,000 per hectare per year in goods and services to the economies of developing countries with mangroves. Furthermore, over 100 million people residing within 10 kilometers of large mangrove forests derive benefits from them. The emissions resulting from mangrove loss constitute nearly one fifth of global emissions from deforestation, resulting in economic losses ranging from US$6–42 billion annually. Additional socio-economic consequences may encompass effects on public health, employment, income generation, shifts in population and ethnic patterns, and the necessity for relocating families impacted by extreme weather events.

Although there have been no specific assessments measuring the monetary contributions of mangroves, in terms of the services and products they provide, to the Nigerian economy, mangroves yield tangible benefits such as fuelwood, crabs, shrimps, honey, medicine, dyes, thatch, salt, and periwinkles. These resources are essential for sustaining rural livelihoods and represent significant sources of income for rural inhabitants, particularly those residing in coastal communities. Apart from these evident goods, mangroves offer intangible services by acting as a protective barrier for coastal communities and serving as important breeding grounds for fish.

The economic repercussions of mangrove deforestation and degradation in the Niger Delta Region are profoundly significant, especially given that the region houses the oil industry, a major contributor to Nigeria's wealth. Lubeck et al. (2007)A considerable presence of oil infrastructure, including over 600 oil fields, 5,284 on- and off-shore oil wells, 10 export terminals, 275 flow stations, 4 refineries, and an LNG project, all situated in the Niger Delta Region. Additionally, there are numerous subsidiary companies, investments, and a substantial human population in the area. Consequently, the current extensive mangrove destruction, coupled with extreme weather events induced by climate change, is poised to result in substantial and profound economic losses.
