= Pongara National Park =

National park in Gabon

- IUCN category II (national park)
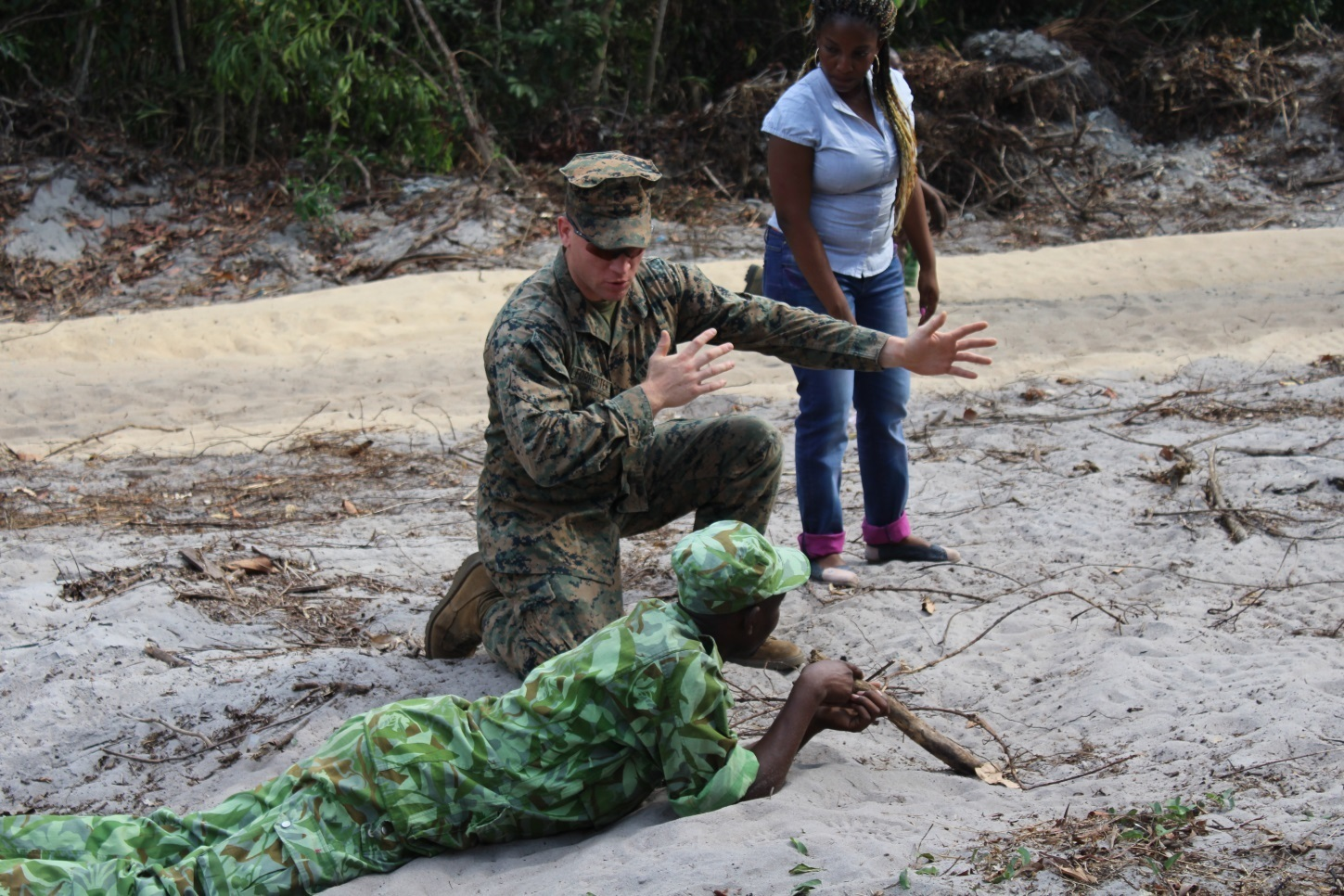
- A ranger of the National Agency for National Parks and a US Marine in the Pongara National Forest

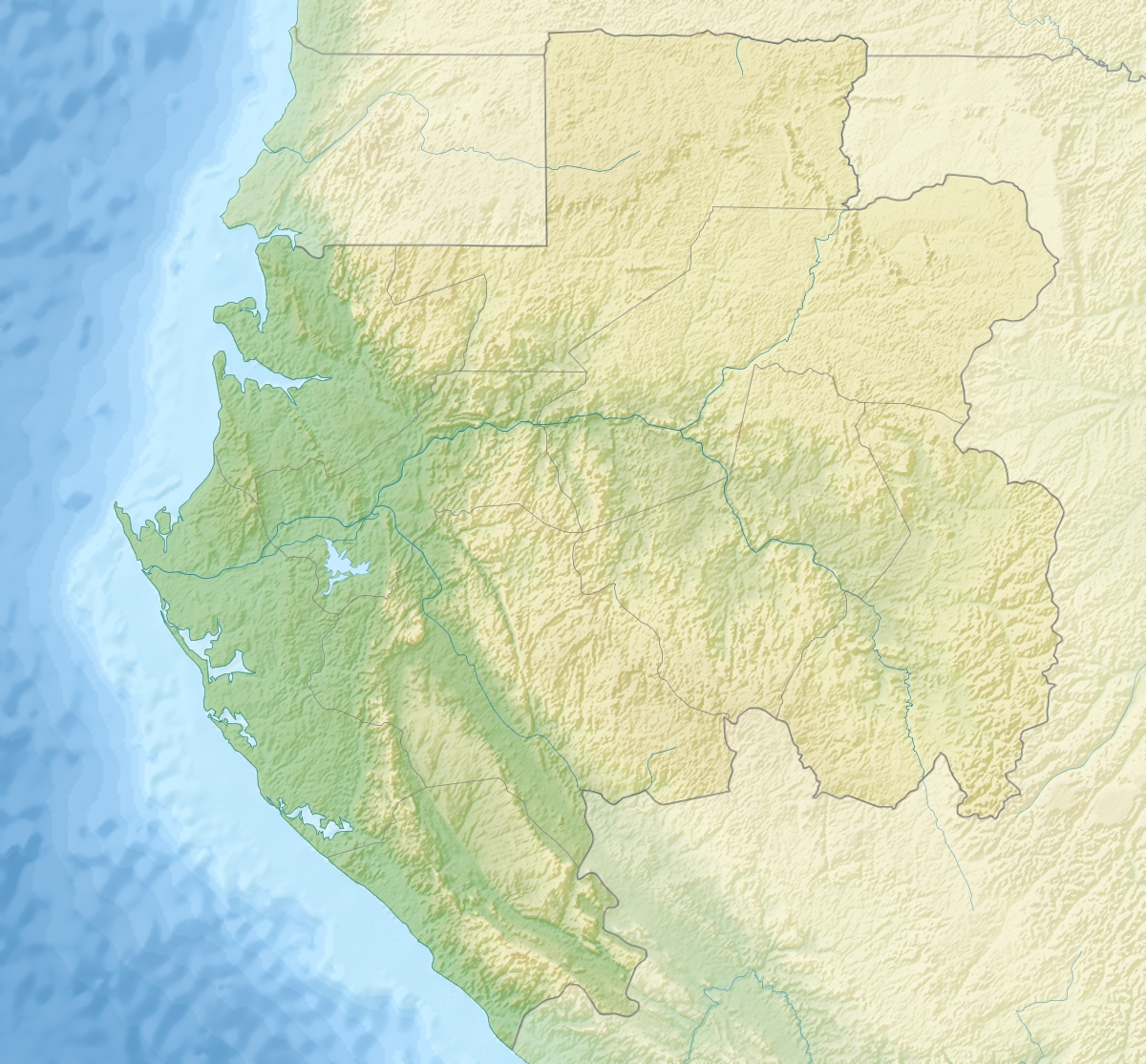
- Location within Gabon
- Location: Gabon
- Coordinates: 0°07′N 9°38′E
- Area: 929 km^{2} (359 sq mi)
- Governing body: National Agency for National Parks

Ramsar Wetland
- Official name: Parc National Pongara
- Designated: 2 February 2007
- Reference no.: 1653

Pongara National Park (French: Parc national de Pongara) is a national park in Gabon, located near the capital, Libreville, on the south side of the Gabon Estuary and the Atlantic Ocean. Covering an area of 929km^{2}, the national park is composed chiefly of moist tropical forests and mangrove forests.

== Description ==
Pongara National Park is situated on the southern side of the Gabon Estuary and covers an area of 96,302 hectares (371.82 mi^{2}). The site is predominantly forested and encompasses various habitats, including mangrove forest, swamp forest, riverine forest, and seasonally-inundated forest. Additionally, there is a long strip of sandy beach area and some grassy savanna within the park. Several rivers, such as the River Remboué, the River Igombiné, and the River Gomgoué, flow through the park and empty into the estuary

== Flora ==
The mangrove forests are dominated by Avicennia and Rhizophora species, and these and the golden leather fern (Acrostichum aureum) help stabilise the habitat and slow down water flow. People have been living here since at least the Neolithic era and gather timber, grow cassava and banana, and hunt and fish.

== Fauna ==
Elephants, gorillas, monkeys, buffaloes, duikers and chimpanzees are present in the rainforest, Hawksbill sea turtles (Eretmochelys imbricata), green sea turtles (Chelonia mydas) and olive ridley sea turtle (Lepidochelys olivacea) visit the estuary and the beaches are used by leatherback sea turtles for breeding. A local conservation organisation monitors the female leatherback turtles as they come ashore to lay their eggs, tags them, guards the nests, operates a turtle hatchery and provides ecological education for the local populace. Many migratory birds visit the estuary and up to 10,000 waders overwinter there.
