= National Agency for National Parks =

Gabon's national park administration

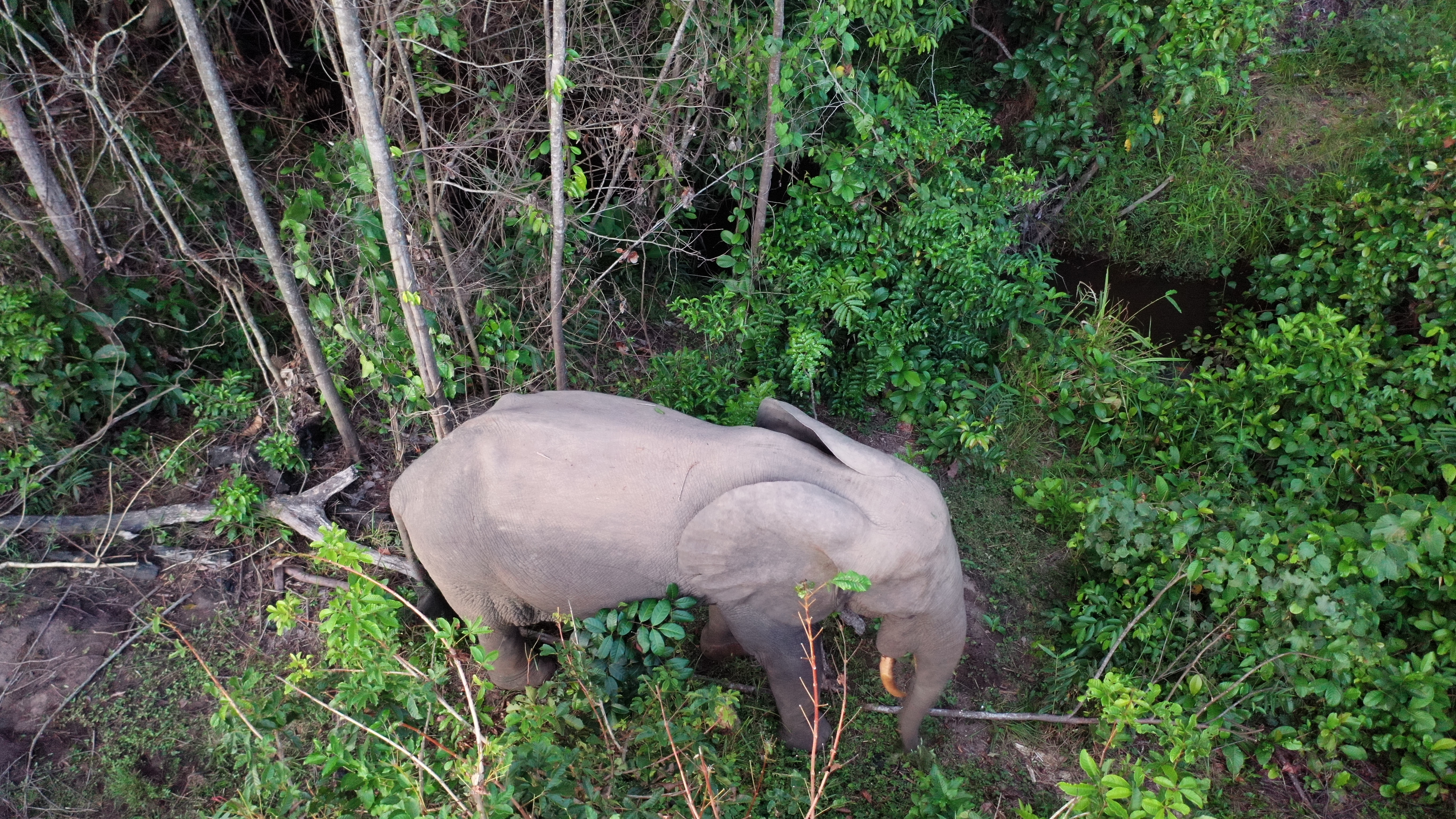
Elephant in Ivindo National Park

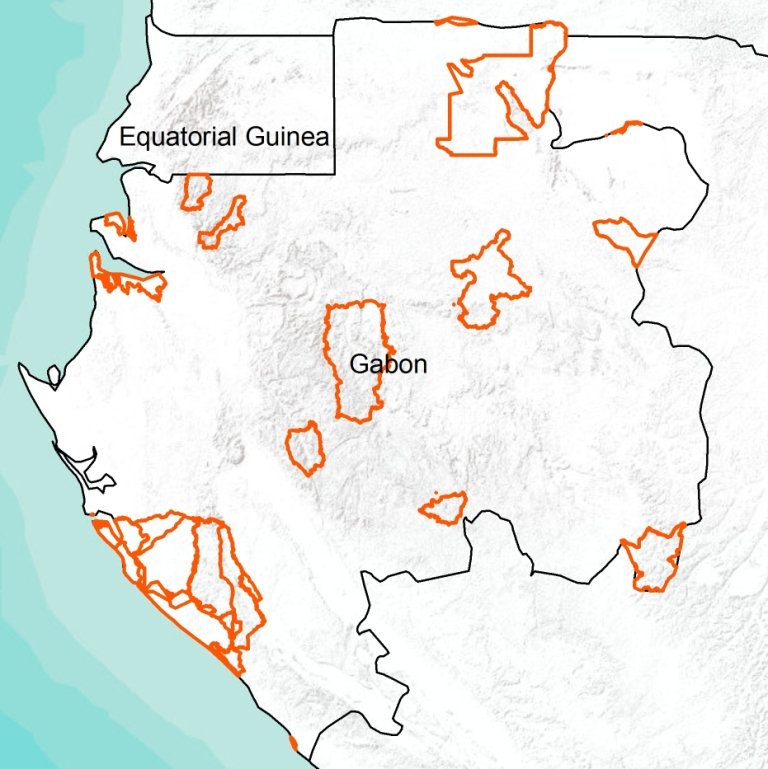
Map of national parks

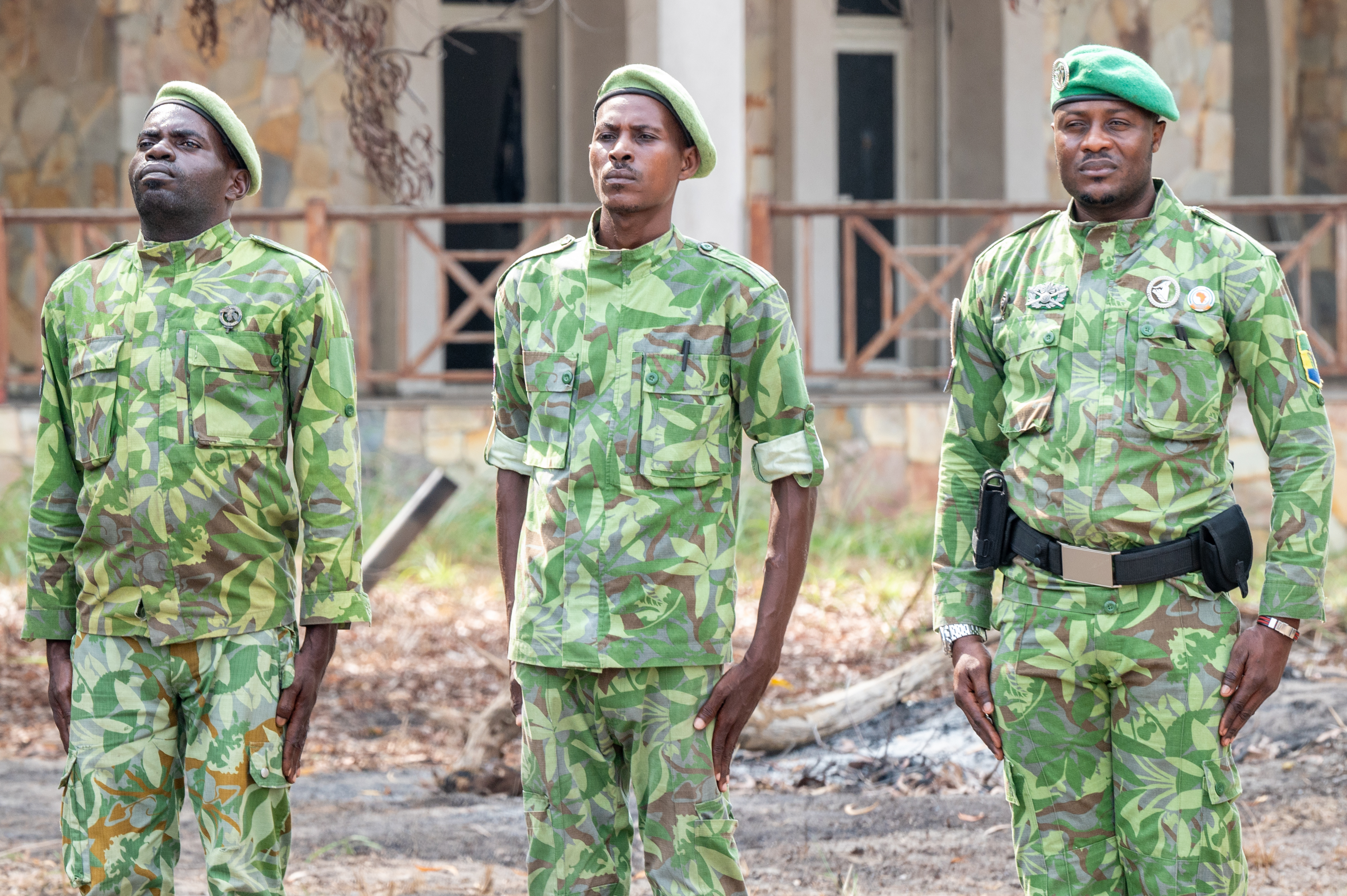
Agence Nationale des Parcs Nationaux park rangers

The National Agency for National Parks (French: Agence Nationale des Parcs Nationaux) is the authority in Gabon charged with overseeing the national park system and with protecting their resources and wildlife. The agency coordinates research activities, license concessionaires, promote tourism, and have police powers.

== History ==
On 30 August 2002, the President Omar Bongo created 13 national parks containing 2,837,128 hectares (7,010,700 acres), almost 11% of the total land area of the country. In addition, these parks include 129,307 hectares (319,520 acres) of marine territory. The National Council for National Parks (CNPN) was an interdepartmental body created to establish the National Parks. In 2007 the National Agency for National Parks was established by the laws adopted as the legal framework of the park system.

== See also ==
- List of national parks of Gabon
