= Bab Boudir =

Bab Boudir ⴱⴰⴱ ⴱⵓⴷⵉⵔ
- commune
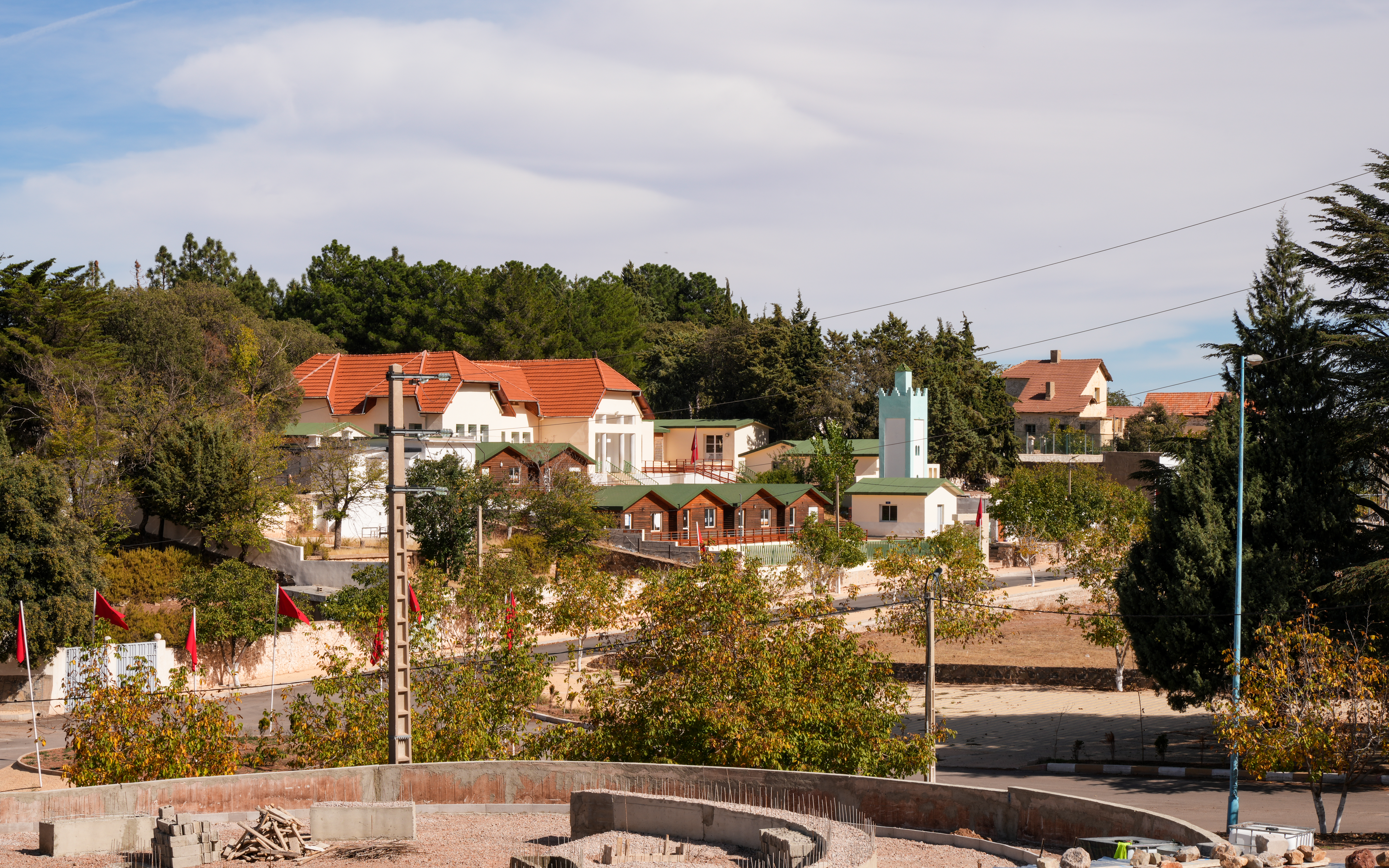
- Central Bab Boudir

- Location in Morocco
- Coordinates: 34°04′10″N 4°07′15″W
- Country: Morocco
- Region: Fès-Meknès
- Province: Taza
- Elevation: 1,289 m (4,229 ft)

Population (2024)
  - Total: 4,209
- Time zone: UTC+0 (GMT)

Bab Boudir is a rural commune in the Taza Province of the Fès-Meknès administrative region of Morocco. At the time of the 2024 census, the commune had a total population of 4,209 in 1,013 households.

== Geography ==
Bab Boudir commune is located in the northern slopes of the Middle Atlas in Taza Province of the Fès-Meknès region. The village of Bab Boudir is on RP5420 at a distance of 34 km (21 mi) from the provincial capital Taza. The commune includes a number of hamlets. Part of the Daya Chiker polje depression is within the boundaries of the commune. Part of the commune is within the Tazekka National Park, including the extensive Friuato cave system.

== Demographics ==
In 2004, the commune had a total population of 6,100 in 898 households. By the time of the 2024 census, the total population had declined to 4,209 in 1,013 households.

== Amenities ==
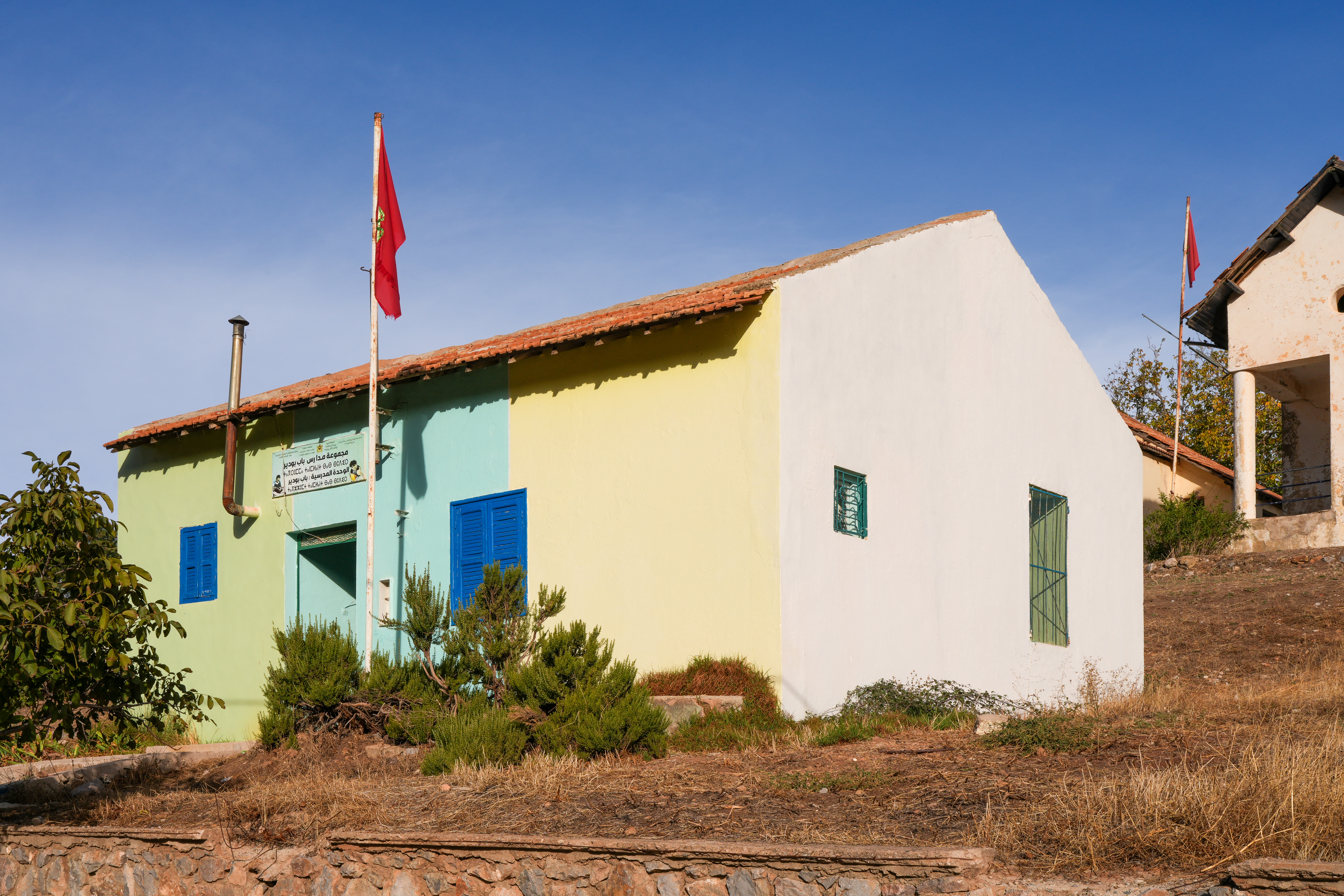
Public primary school, Bab Boudir village

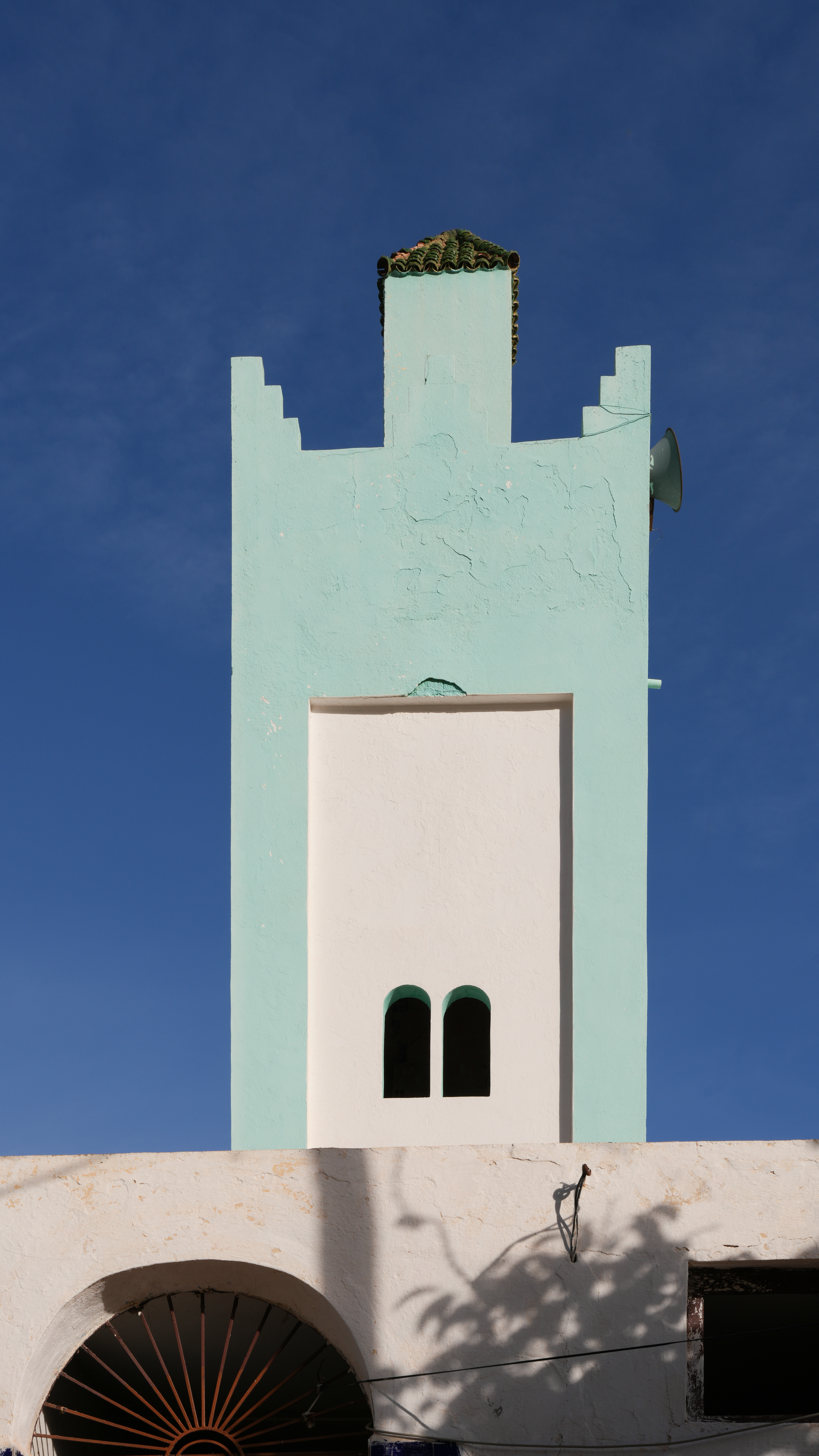
Mosque, Bab Boudir village

Bab Boudir has two public primary schools, one located in Bab Boudir village, the other in Sidi Majbar village. The village has a level 1 rural health centre., a mosque, a swimming pool and tourist accommodation.

== Tourism ==
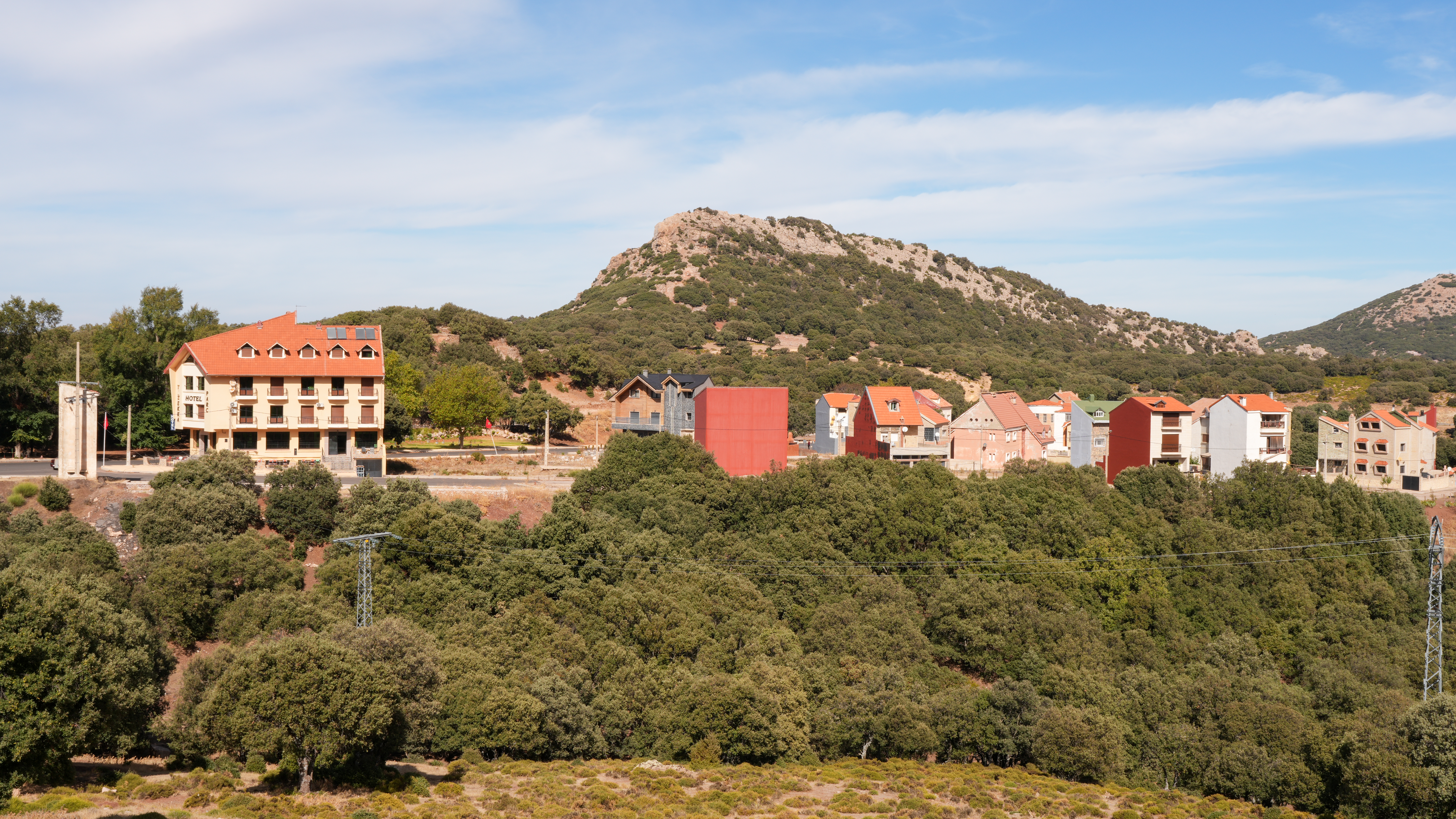
Tazekka Parc Hotel and other buildings

Bab Boudir is located in the Tazekka National Park. The village of Bab Boudir has a campsite and hotels. It is occupied during the summer.
