= Tazekka National Park =

National park in Morocco

- IUCN category II (national park)

- Location within Morocco
- Location: Morocco
- Nearest city: Taza
- Coordinates: 34°6′0″N 4°11′0″W
- Area: 120 km^{2} (46 sq mi)
- Established: 1950

Tazekka National Park is a national park of Morocco. It is located in the Middle Atlas, near the city of Taza.

== History ==
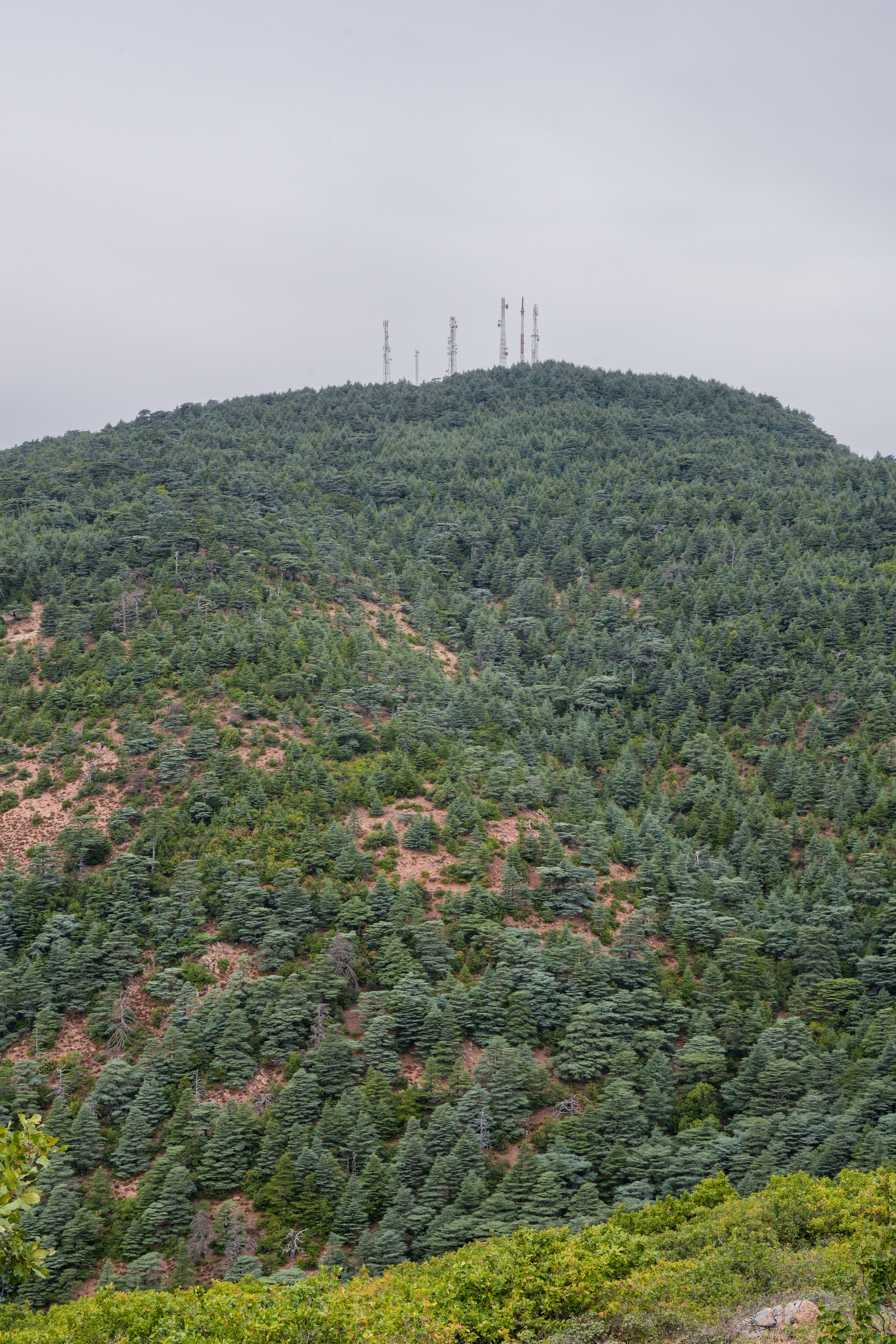
Jbel Tazekka cloaked with Atlas cedars

The park was created in 1950 with an initial area of 6.8 km^{2} to protect the natural resources around Jbel Tazekka (elevation 1,980 m), particularly the grove of cedars (Cedrus atlantica), which are isolated on this peak in the Middle Atlas range.

In 1989, the park was extended to include nearly 120 km^{2} of ecologically important areas, including forests of cork oak and holm oak, as well as canyons, caves, cascades, and rural landscapes.

== Geography ==
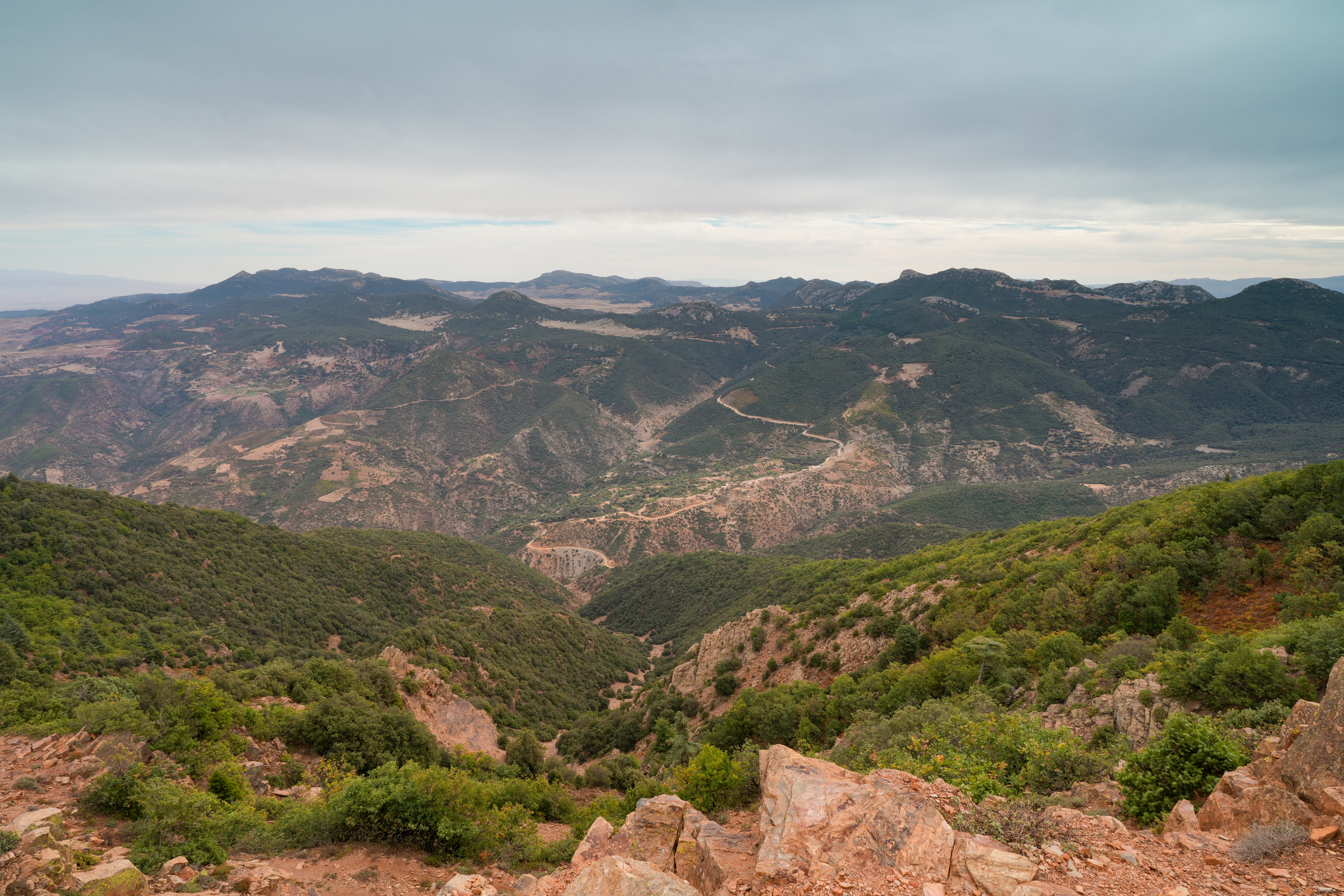
Northeast part of Tazekka Park, from Tazekka mountain. Rugged terrain, live oak shrubs and some habitations.

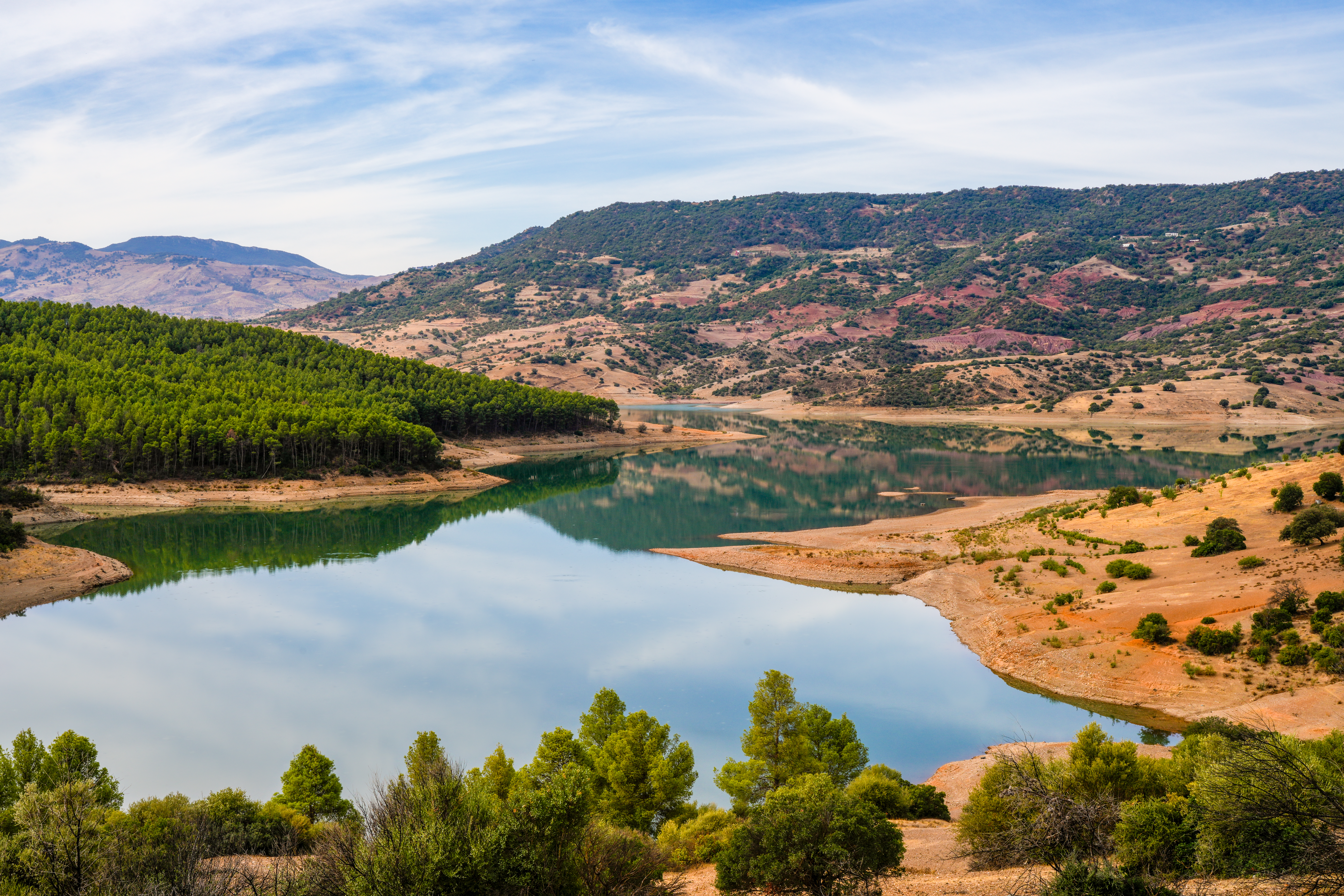
Bab Louta reservoir

=== Climate ===
Atmospheric moisture condenses as it is orographically lifted over the mountain. As a result, the mountain frequently shows a cap cloud and annually receives approximately 180 cm of precipitation, particularly in the form of snow.

=== Fauna ===
Mammals are represented by North African boars, porcupines, otters, small-spotted genets, hares, African wolves, and red foxes. Barbary leopards, striped hyenas and caracals, which were found once in the area, are extinct. The Barbary stag was extinct as well, but has been reintroduced.

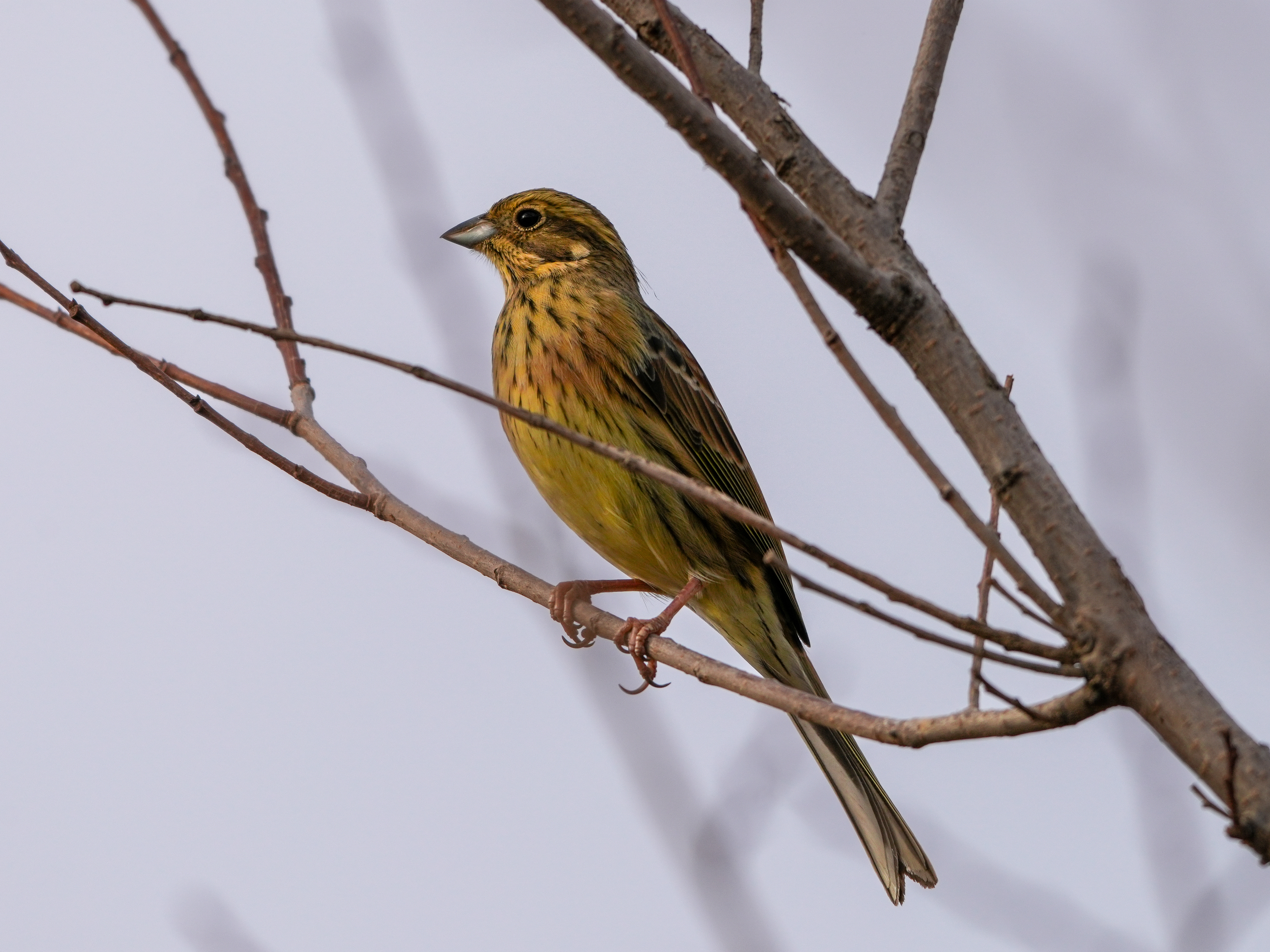
Cirl bunting, Daya Chiker

The park has been designated an Important Bird Area (IBA) by BirdLife International because it supports significant populations of Barbary partridges, Levaillant's woodpeckers, subalpine and Sardinian warblers, spotless starlings, Moussier's redstarts, and black-eared and black wheatears.

=== Geology ===
The northern part of the park is adjacent to the Daya Chiker polje. This depression is bordered by a limestone range that contains the Friuato Caves. At 272 m (892 ft) deep, the cave system has a rich collection of chambers, narrow tunnels, and natural bridges, full of stalactites and stalagmites. An underground river about 3.8 km (2.4 mi) long flows through the cave system. The 100 m (330 ft) deep vertical entrance has concrete steps and a ramp. This leads the visitor into the system of vast chambers connected by narrow tunnels. At lower levels, the temperature is constant between 12–14 °C (54–57 °F) and the high humidity results in condensation on the walls.
