= List of national parks of Morocco =

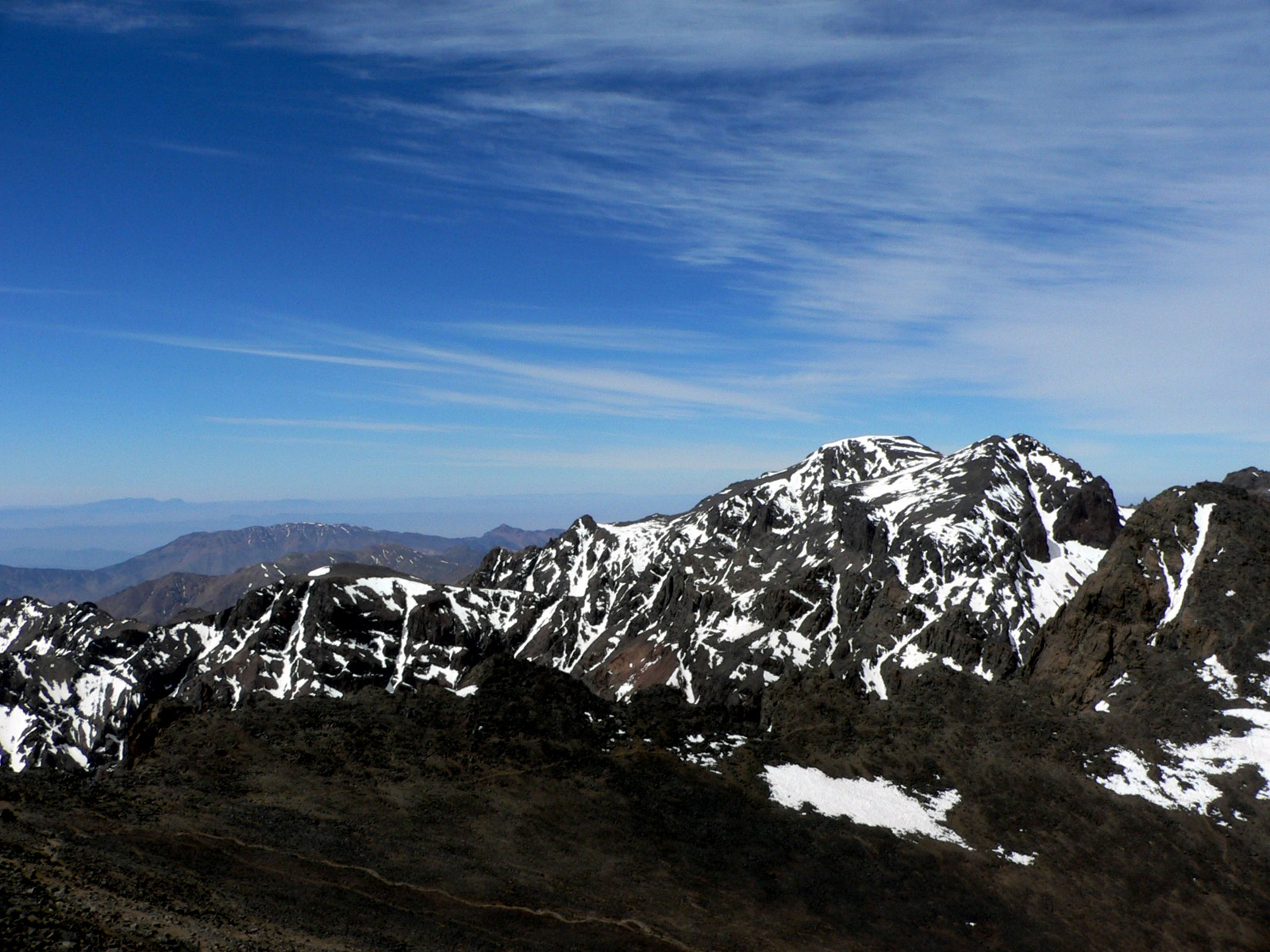
Toubkal, at 4,167 metres (13,671 ft), in Toubkal National Park

There are 11 national parks in Morocco. Toubkal National Park, established in 1942, is the oldest and by far the most visited. The parks are situated rather well in-line, so it already allows wildlife migration to some extent. The only missing component in this wildlife corridor is a gap between Al-Hoceima and Seghir (so roughly at the location of Hakkama). Closing this gap would facilitate wildlife passage (of mainly birds) to the Spanish park of Los Alcornocales.

== National parks ==
- Al Hoceima National Park
- Dakhla National Park (see Dakhla)
- Haut Atlas Oriental National Park
- Ifrane National Park
- Iriqui National Park
- Khenifiss National Park
- Khenifra National Park
- Souss-Massa National Park
- Talassemtane National Park
- Tazekka National Park
- Toubkal National Park
- Merdja Zerka National Park (Permanent Biological Reserve)

== See also ==
- List of national parks
- List of national parks in Africa
