= Salmo pallaryi =

Conservation status
- Extinct (1930s) (IUCN 3.1)

Scientific classification
- Kingdom: Animalia
- Phylum: Chordata
- Class: Actinopterygii
- Division: Teleostei
- Order: Salmoniformes
- Family: Salmonidae
- Genus: Salmo
- Species: †S. pallaryi

Binomial name
- †Salmo pallaryi Pellegrin, 1924

Extinct species of fish

The Lake Sidi Ali trout (Salmo pallaryi) is an extinct species of salmonid fish that inhabited a single lake in the Atlas Mountains of northern Morocco, at higher than 2,000 metres (6,560 ft) elevation. It went extinct in the 1930s, probably because of introduction of common carp in the lake. Only two individuals remain in museum collections.
