= Lake Aguelmame Sidi Ali =

Lake in Morocco

Aguelmame Sidi Ali
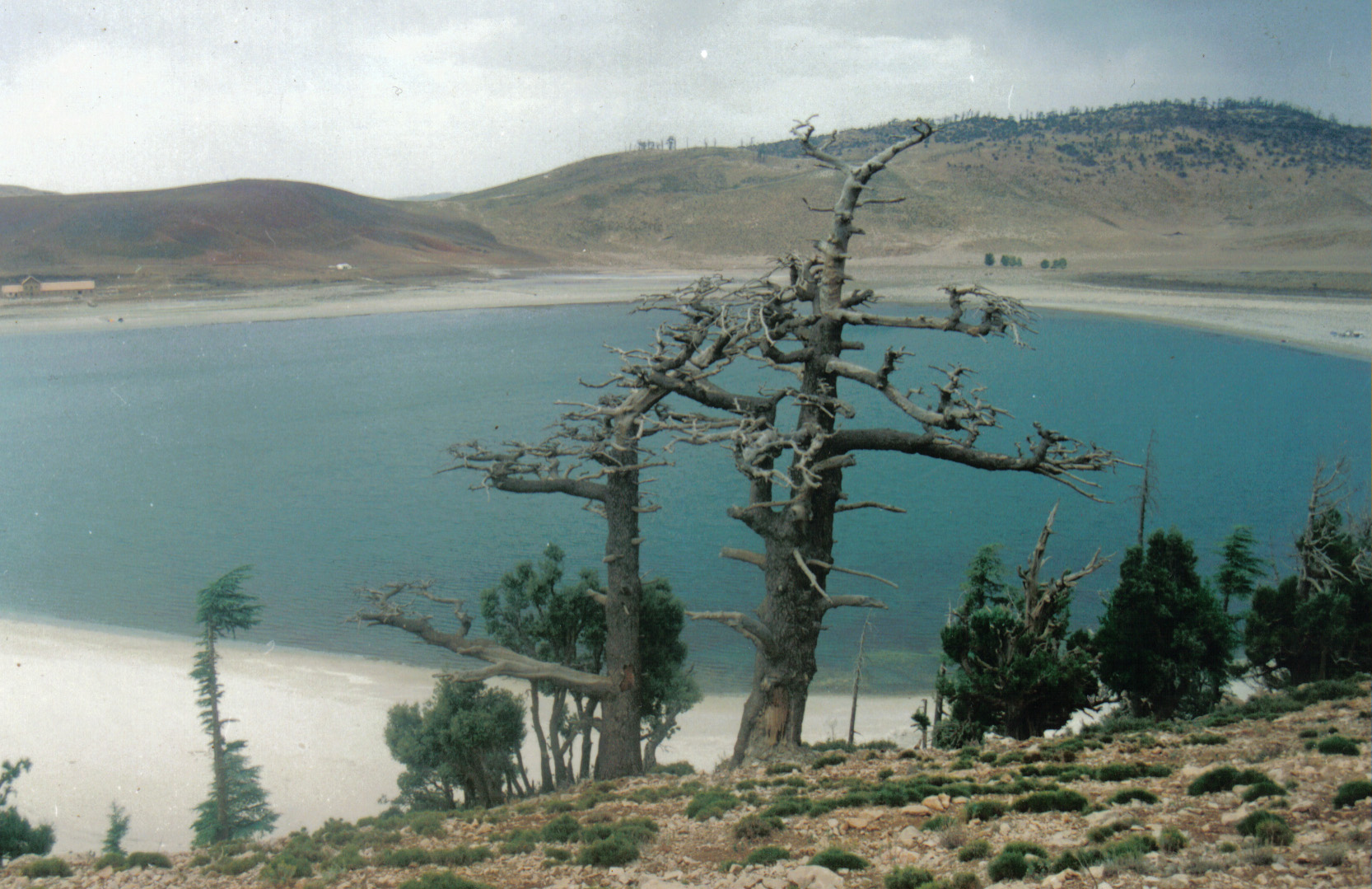
- A view of the lake
- Interactive map of Aguelmame Sidi Ali
- Location: Khenifra National Park, Morocco
- Coordinates: 33°04′18″N 04°59′52″W; Google satellite map
- Basin countries: Morocco
- Surface area: 40 km^{2} (15 sq mi)
- Max. depth: 36 m (118 ft)

Ramsar Wetland
- Official name: Aguelmams Sidi Ali – Tifounassine
- Designated: 15 January 2005
- Reference no.: 1468

Aguelmame Sidi Ali is a lake in Khénifra Province, Béni Mellal-Khénifra, Morocco. Located at an altitude of 2,080 metres, Aguelmame Sidi Ali has a surface area of approximately 500 hectares (1,200 acres) and a depth of 36 m (118 ft). It is near the boundary of the province of Ifrane in the Middle Atlas mountains. It is part of Khenifra National Park, a 842 km^{2} (325 mi^{2}) protected area created in 2008.

== Description ==
The lake is located in the Middle Atlas mountains at an altitude of 2,080 m (6,824 ft) and has a catchment area of about 15.6 km^{2} (6 mi^{2}). It was formed in the Upper Miocene/Quaternary at the intersection of two faults. It is located in a natural hollow in the basalt rock and is formed from two basins, separated by a basal ridge which is exposed when the water level falls. It is fed by runoff, snowmelt and karst springs. The pH is 9.1 and the mineral content is relatively low with a conductivity of 1200–1600 uScm-1.

== Ecology ==
The area surrounding the lake was once well-forested with Atlas cedar (Cedrus atlantica), but more recently, this forest has become degraded and the area around the lake has become dry, thorny scrubland dominated by Spanish juniper (Juniperus thurifera). The plankton and sediment in the lake is rich in diatoms, particularly of the genus Cyclotella, and these have been used to provide evidence of the paleohydrology and related hydroclimatic changes the lake has undergone over the aeons.

In 2005, the Aguelmams Sidi Ali / Tifounassine complex, three mountain wetlands at altitudes between 1,900 and 2,100 m (6,234 and 6,890 ft), have been designated as a Ramsar site; they provide important over-wintering sites for migratory wetland birds including the ruddy shelduck (Tadorna ferruginea) and the crested coot (Fulica cristata). A decreasing trend in precipitation has lowered the water level of the lake, and a marsh that used to be at the southwest end no longer exists. The grazing of flocks of sheep and goats by nomadic herdsmen in the spring and summer has all but eliminated the aquatic vegetation at the edge of the lake. A reduced number of water birds visit the lake in winter and the great crested grebe no longer breeds here. Despite being protected, the ruddy shelduck and other wildfowl suffer from poaching.

The lake used to be the only place in the world where Salmo pallaryi, a native species of trout, lived but that fish became extinct after the common carp (Cyprinus carpio) was released into the lake in 1934. The northern pike (Esox lucius) and the zander (Sander lucioperca), are other non-native fish species also introduced in the lake.
