= Khenifra National Park =

National park in Morocco

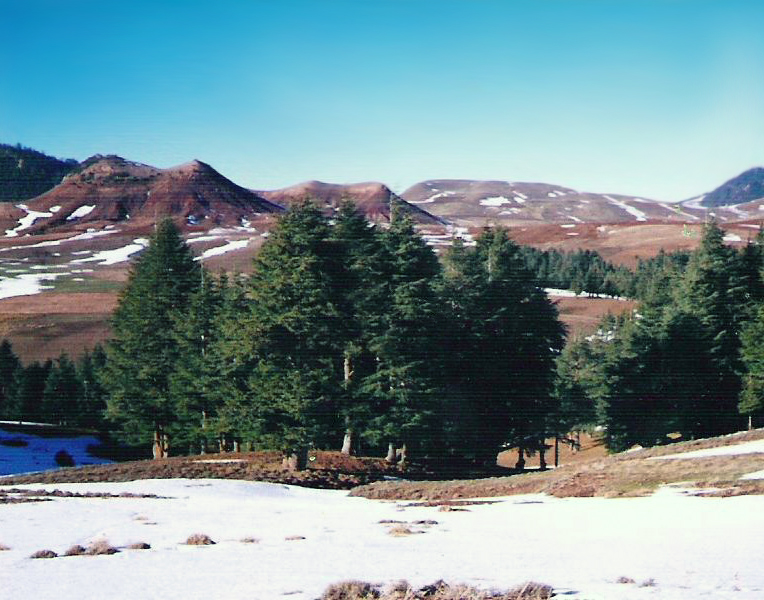
- Cedrus libani var. atlantica (Atlas Cedar); syn: Cedrus atlantica - in a native habitat in the Middle Atlas Mountains, Morocco.

- Location within Morocco
- Location: Morocco
- Coordinates: 32.935505°N 5.429707°W
- Area: 842 km^{2} (325 sq mi)
- Established: 2008

Khenifra National Park is a national park in central Morocco, east of the city of the same name. The park was created in 2008 and is 842 square kilometres (325 sq mi) in size. Extending across the middle Atlas Mountains, the park is home to a wealth of fauna and flora. Lake Aguelmame Aziza and Lake Aguelmame Sidi Ali are located within its borders.

Some of the wildlife that can be found within the park include the rare Barbary macaque, Barbary stag, Barbary sheep, Cuvier's gazelle, Barbary wild boar, and European polecat. The most notable birds located in Khenifra are the Algerian nuthatch, red-knobbed coot, ruddy shelduck, alpine swift, osprey, and golden eagle.

High and Middle Atlas; the park is at the top center
