= Daya Chiker =

Limestone depression in northeast Morocco

Daya Chiker Daïa Chiker
- Polje
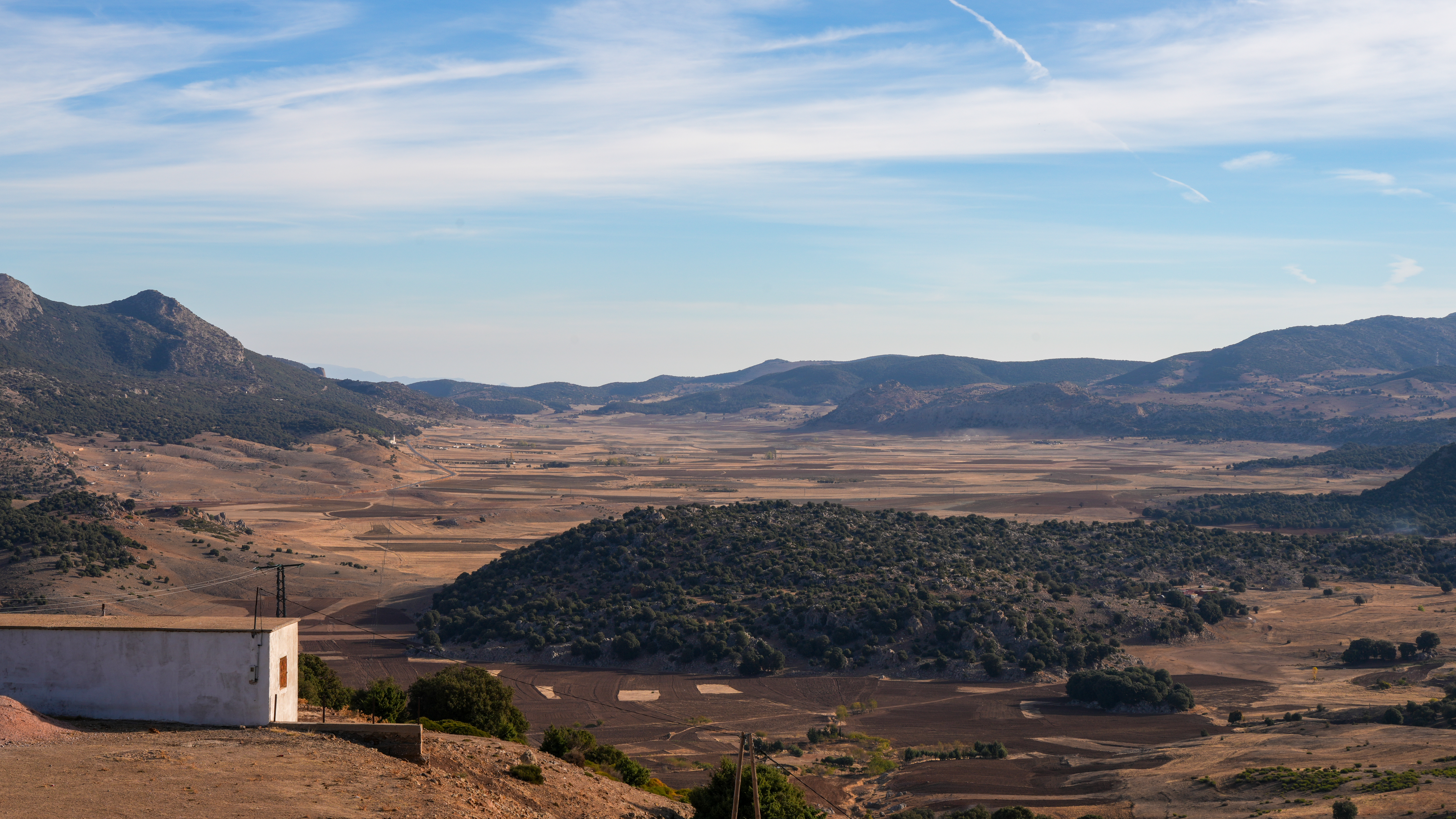
- View from the southwest

- Location within Morocco
- Coordinates: 34.1°N 4.06°W
- Location: Fez-Meknes
- Elevation: 1,348 m

Daya Chiker is a polje depression in Morocco. It is located in the Fez-Meknes region in the northeast. The climate is Mediterranean. Agriculture has been practiced since the late Neolithic period. Tourism is growing due to the adjacent Tazekka National Park.

== History ==
Archaeological artifacts dating from the late Neolithic period (ca. 3800-2200 BC) have been found in Daya Chiker, indicating intensive agriculture in the area. The artifacts include handmade pottery, chipped stone, several polished axes, querns and other hand tools.

== Geography ==
The Daya Chiker polje is located on the northern slopes of the Middle Atlas in the Fez-Meknes region, in the northeast of the country. The depression is the bed of a former lake. By road, Daya Chiker is 260 km (160 mi) east of Rabat, the capital, and 25 km (16 mi) from the city of Taza.

=== Geology ===
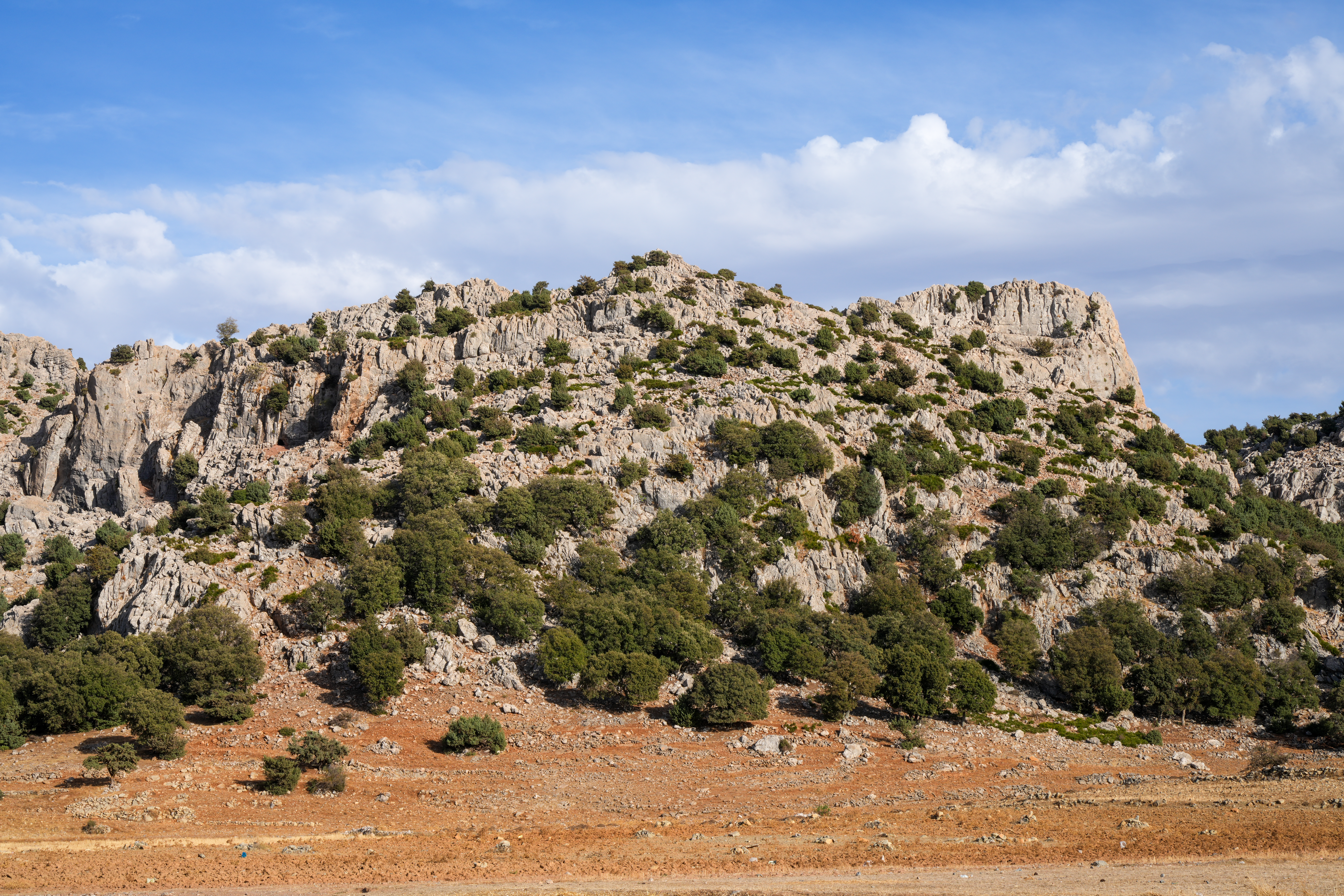
Dolomite cliffs on east edge

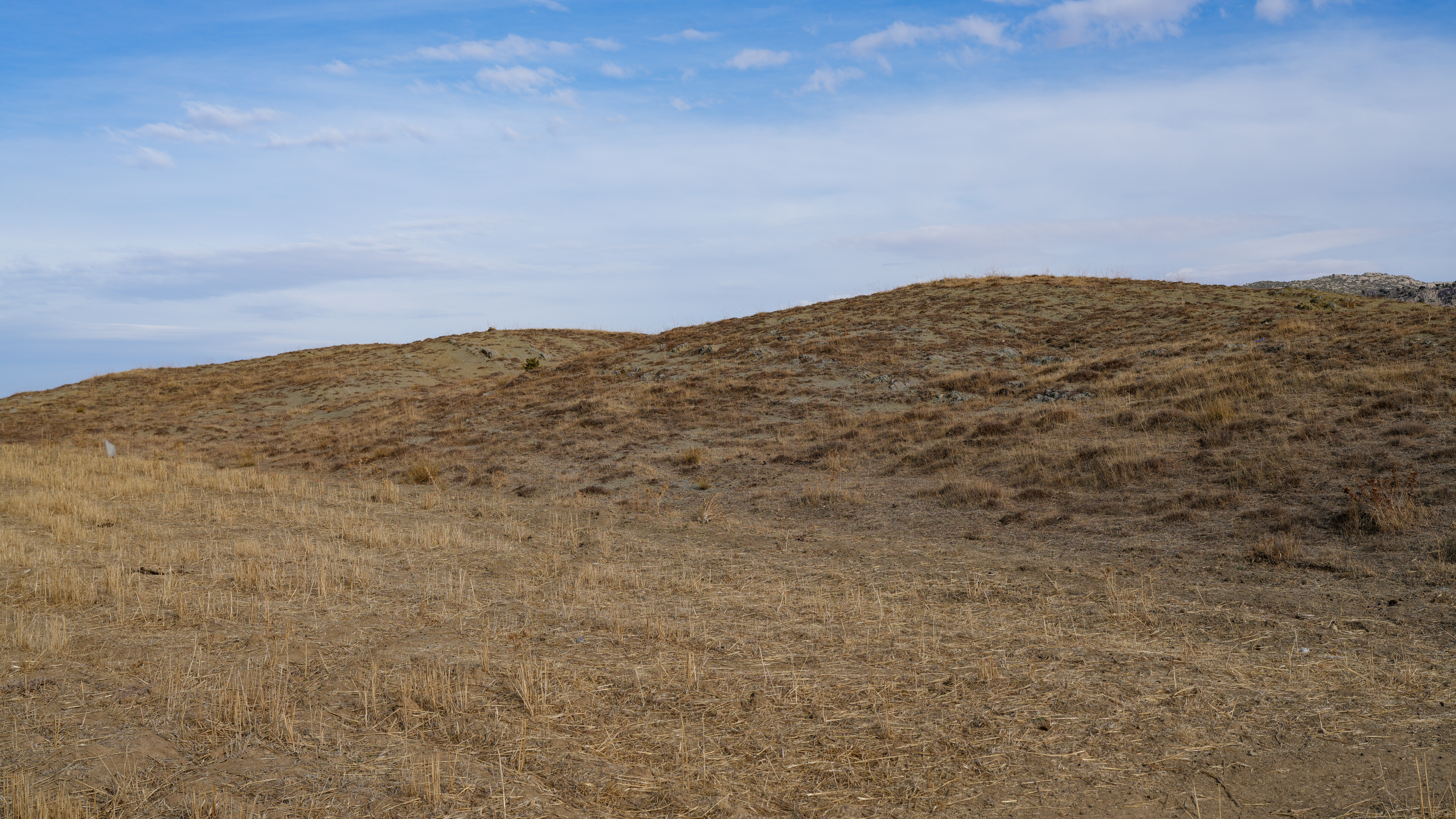
Low schist ridge aligned southwest-northeast

The Daya Chiker polje is a limestone karst formation. It is about 8.7 km (5.4 mi) long in the southwest-northeast direction and 2.2 km (1.4 mi) wide. The large flat depression at an elevation of 1,350 m (4,430 ft) consists of Toarcian schists, a metamorphic rock formed from sedimentary limestone strata. The flat bottom is surrounded on the east, north and west by gray cliffs consisting of hard dolomite. These are covered with open live oak forests. The peaks range between 1,600 to 1,835 m (5,249 to 6,020 ft). The south side, has outcrops of Triassic clays and basalts. The flat bottom has a few low schist hills aligned along the long southwest-northeast axis.

==== Underground grottos ====
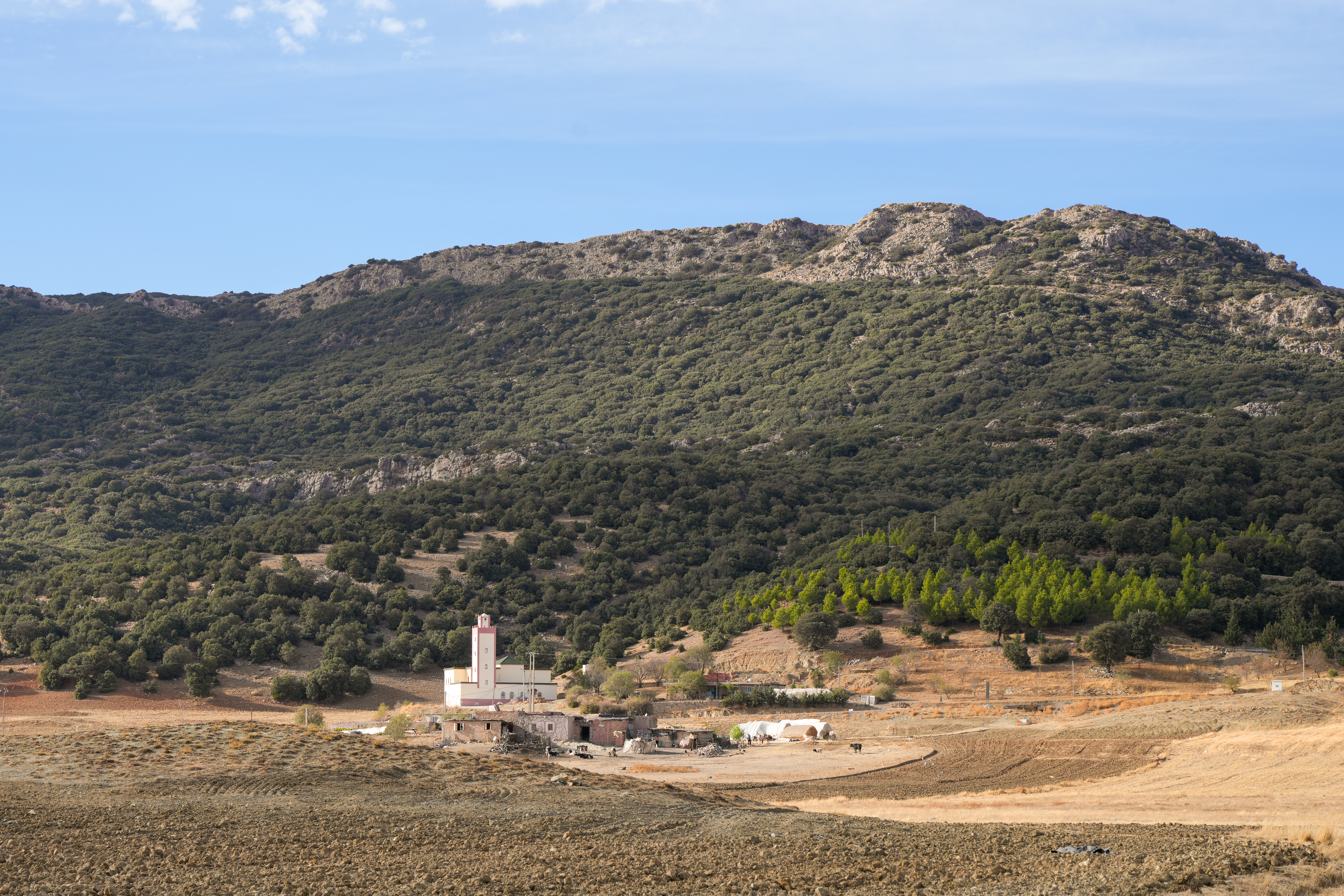
Farmhouse-cum-guest house near the northwest edge. Friuato cave system is beneath the forested ridge.

Karst phenomena including leaching by underground streams and seasonal floods have resulted in a number of sinkholes, caves and grottos along the edges of the Daya Chiker depression. Major underground chasms are the Chiker Grotto and the Friuato Caves, located along the northwest ridge.

The Chiker cave has a depth of 146 m (479 ft) and a length of 3,865 m (12,680 ft). At 272 m (892 ft) deep, the Friuato cave has a rich collection of chambers, narrow tunnels, and natural bridges, full of stalactites and stalagmites. An underground river about 3.8 km (2.4 mi) long flows through the cave system. It is speculated that this river connected with the Chiker cave in the past.

=== Climate ===
The climate is Mediterranean. The average temperature is 16 °C. The hottest month is July, at 28 °C, and the coldest is January, at 7 °C. The average annual rainfall is 595 mm. The wettest month is November, with 135 mm of rain, and the driest is July, with 5 mm.

Daya Chiker

Climate chart (precipitation, max. and min. temperature)
J	F	M	A	M	J	J	A	S	O	N	D
77 11 3	52 14 4	75 18 5	62 23 7	25 26 10	11 32 15	5 38 17	6 37 18	40 31 15	55 24 11	135 16 5	52 12 3
- █ Average max. and min. temperatures in °C
- █ Precipitation totals in mm
Imperial conversion
J	F	M	A	M	J	J	A	S	O	N	D
3 52 37	2 57 39	3 64 41	2.4 73 45	1 79 50	0.4 90 59	0.2 100 63	0.2 99 64	1.6 88 59	2.2 75 52	5.3 61 41	2 54 37
- █ Average max. and min. temperatures in °F
- █ Precipitation totals in inches

== Flora and fauna ==
Several plant species are common here. These include Astragalus maurus, Lathyrussetifolius, Juncus bufonius, Poa alpina, Scrophularia sambucifolia, Carum verticillatum, Artemisia ifranensis, Calendula arvensis and Evax crocidion.

== Habitations ==
Ploughed fields, backed by dolomite cliffs and live oak forests on the southeast edge of Daya Chiker

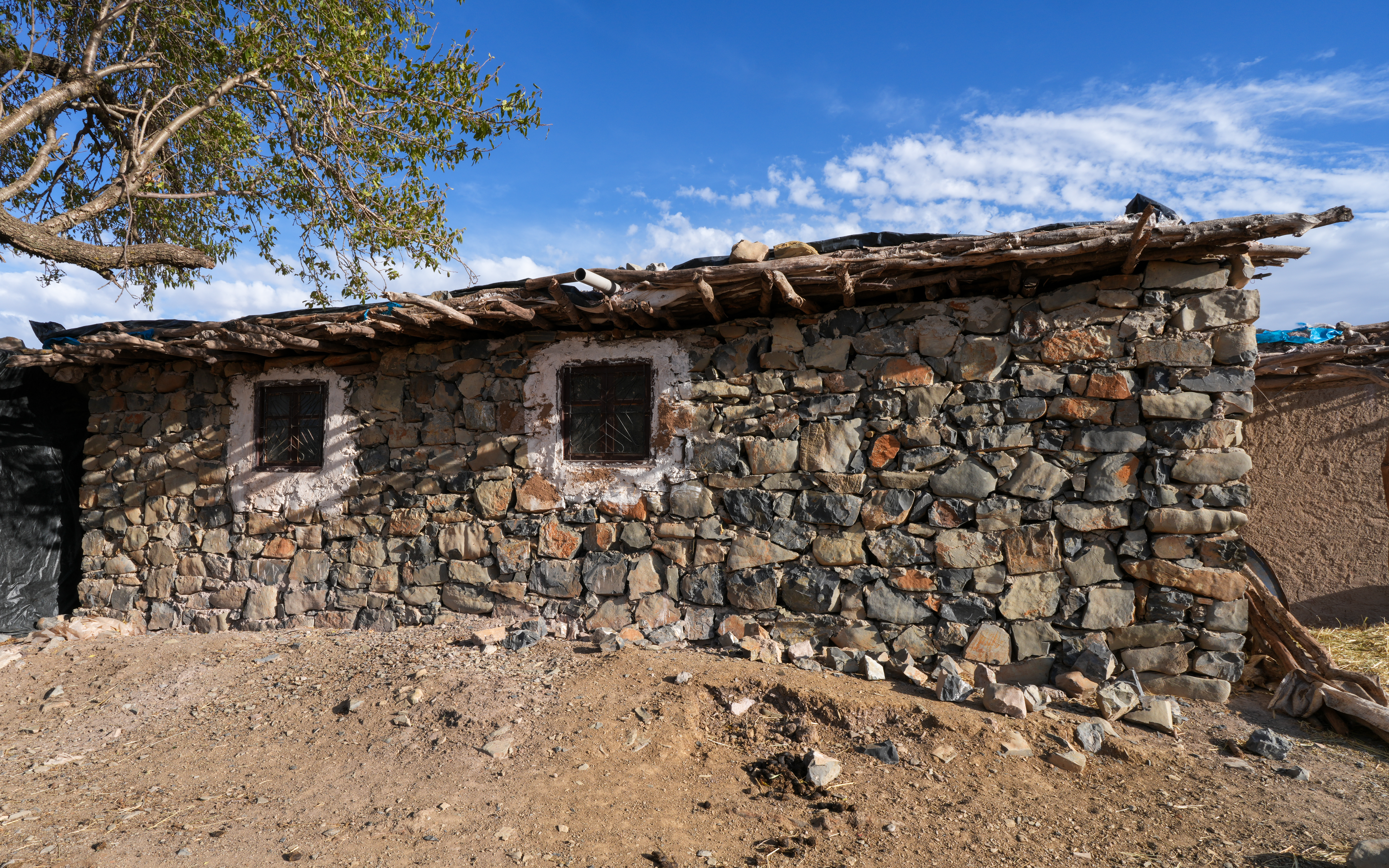
Stone building in a hamlet

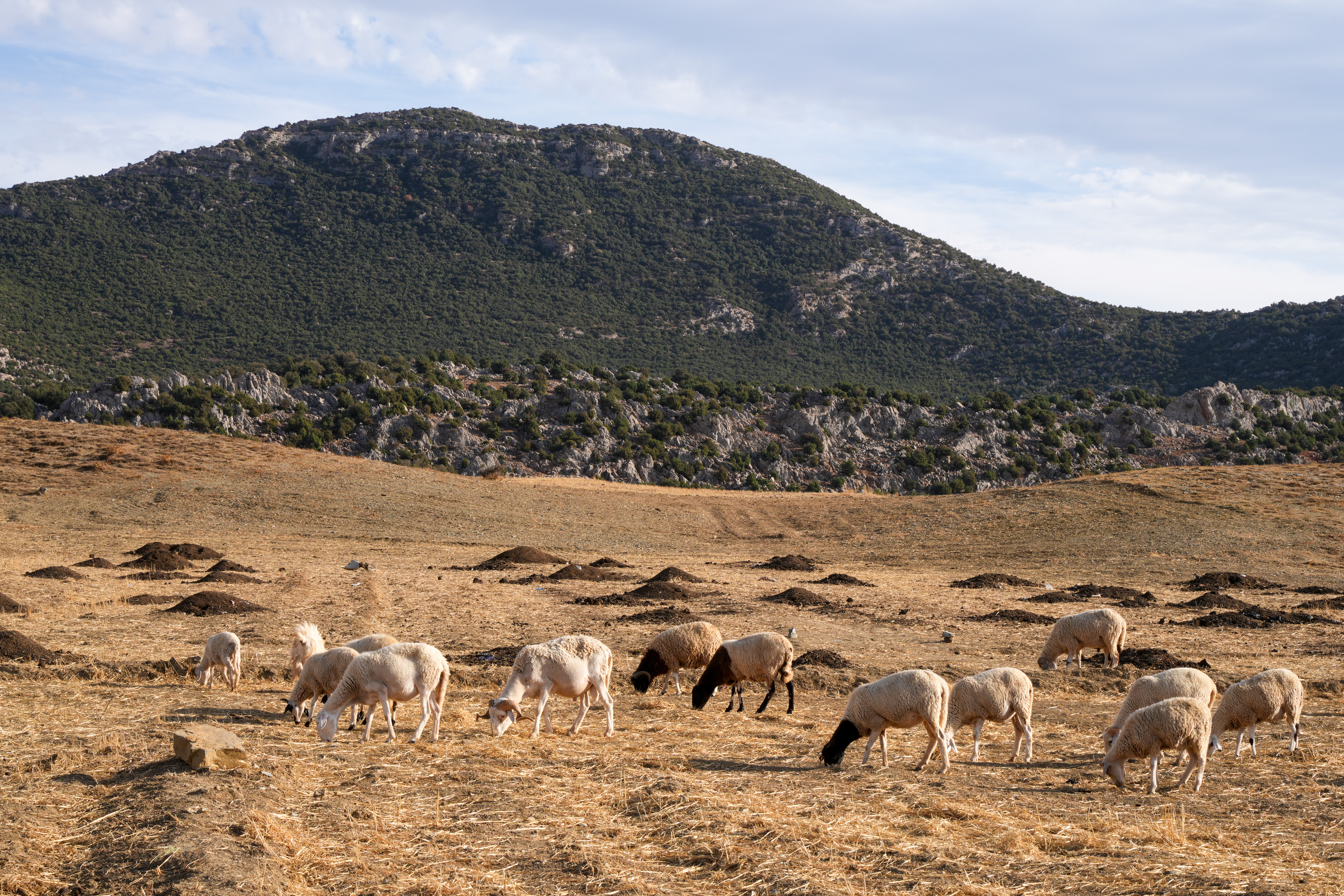
Grazing sheep near southeast dolomite cliffs

Daya Chiker has a few hamlets, with the main activities being agriculture and sheep herding.

== Tourism ==
The Friuato Cave is one of the attractions of the Tazekka National Park, adjacent to Daya Chiker. The 100 m (330 ft) deep vertical entrance has concrete steps and a ramp. This leads the visitor into the system of vast chambers connected by narrow tunnels. At lower levels, the temperature is constant between 12–14 °C (54–57 °F) and the high humidity results in condensation on the walls. A few guest houses in farms offer a rustic experience to tourists.

== Gallery ==
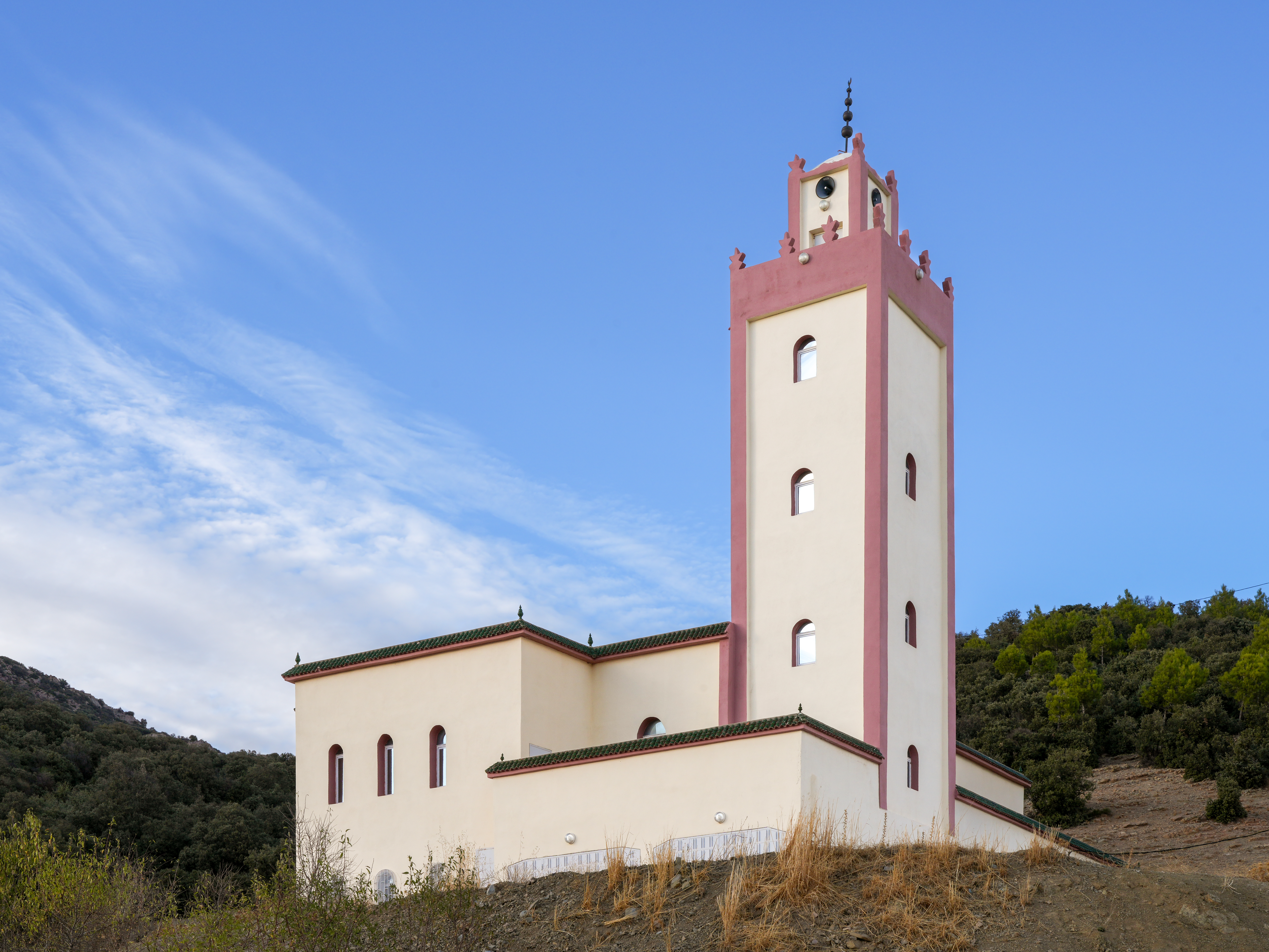
Sheker Mosque

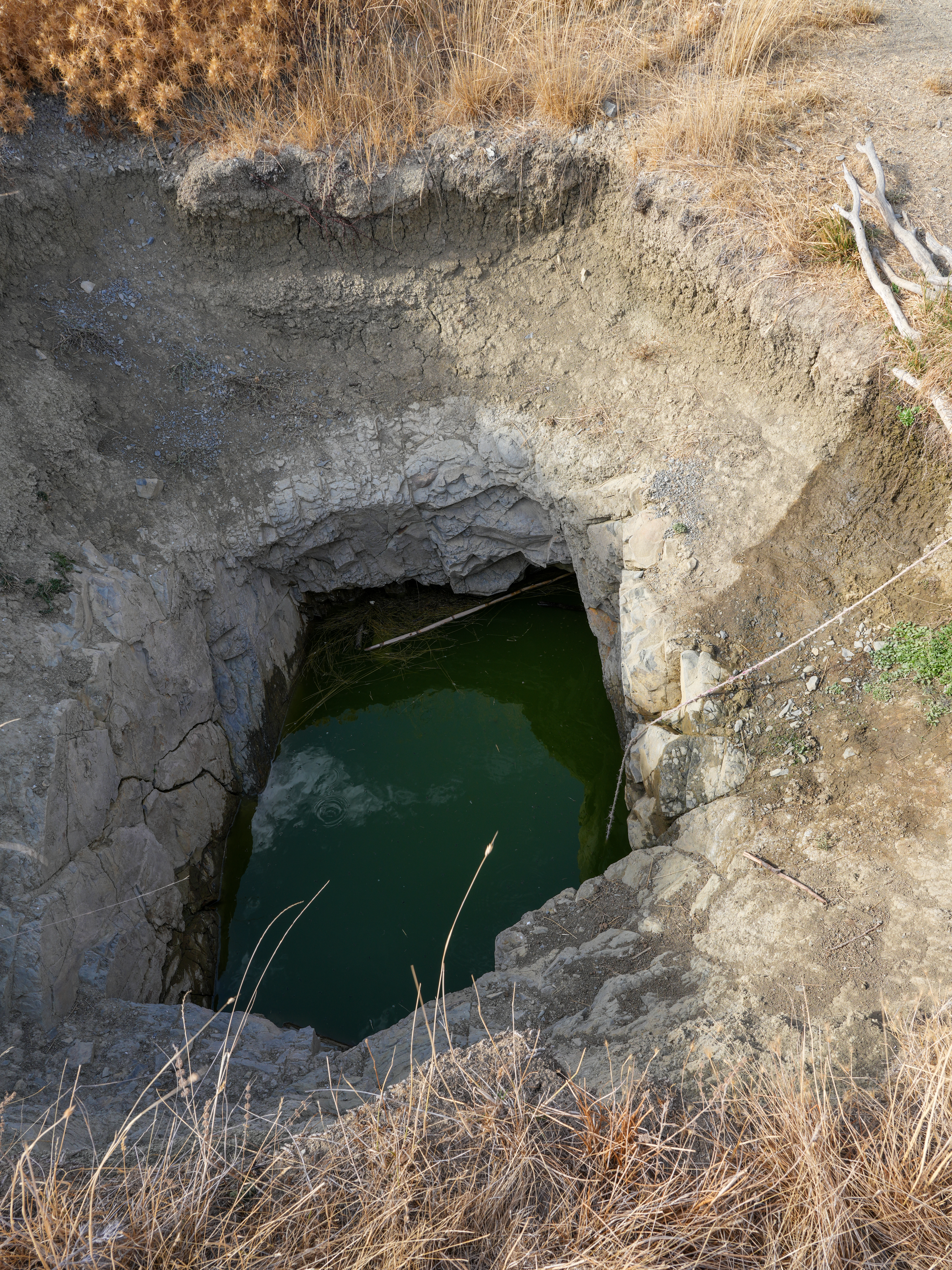
Artisan well for irrigation

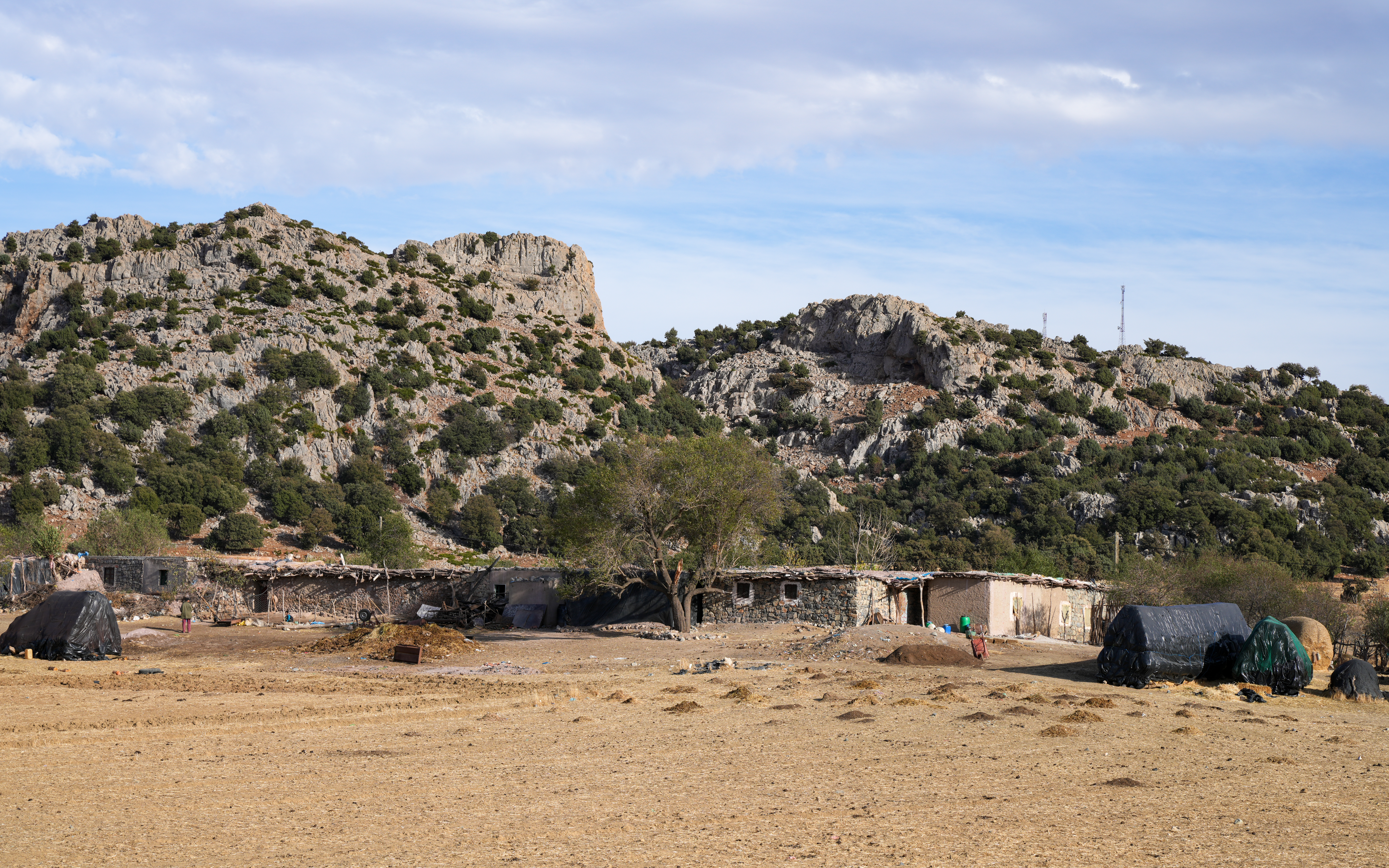
Hamlet near southeast dolomite cliffs

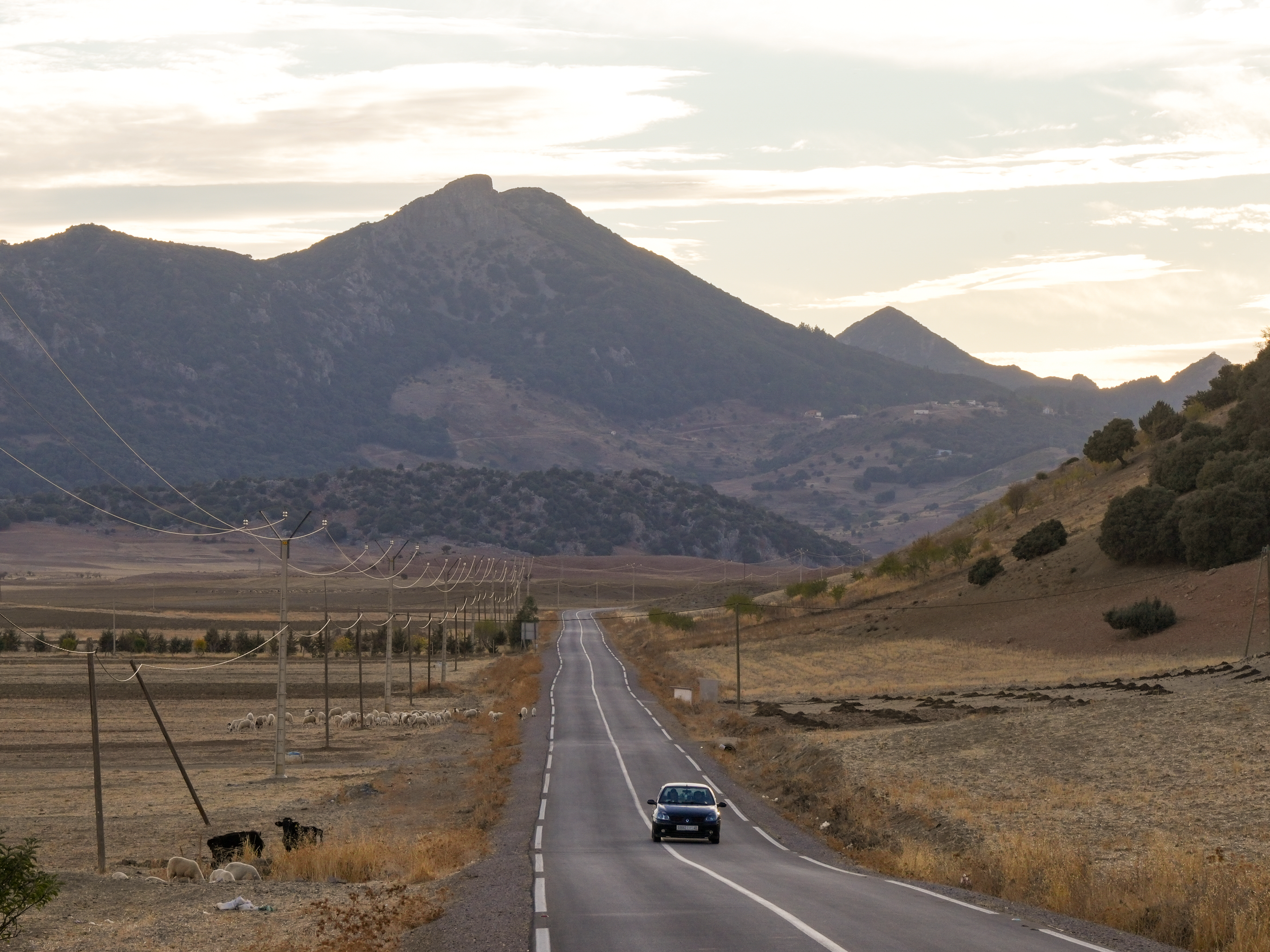
Highway P5420 southeast towards Tazekka Nat'l Park

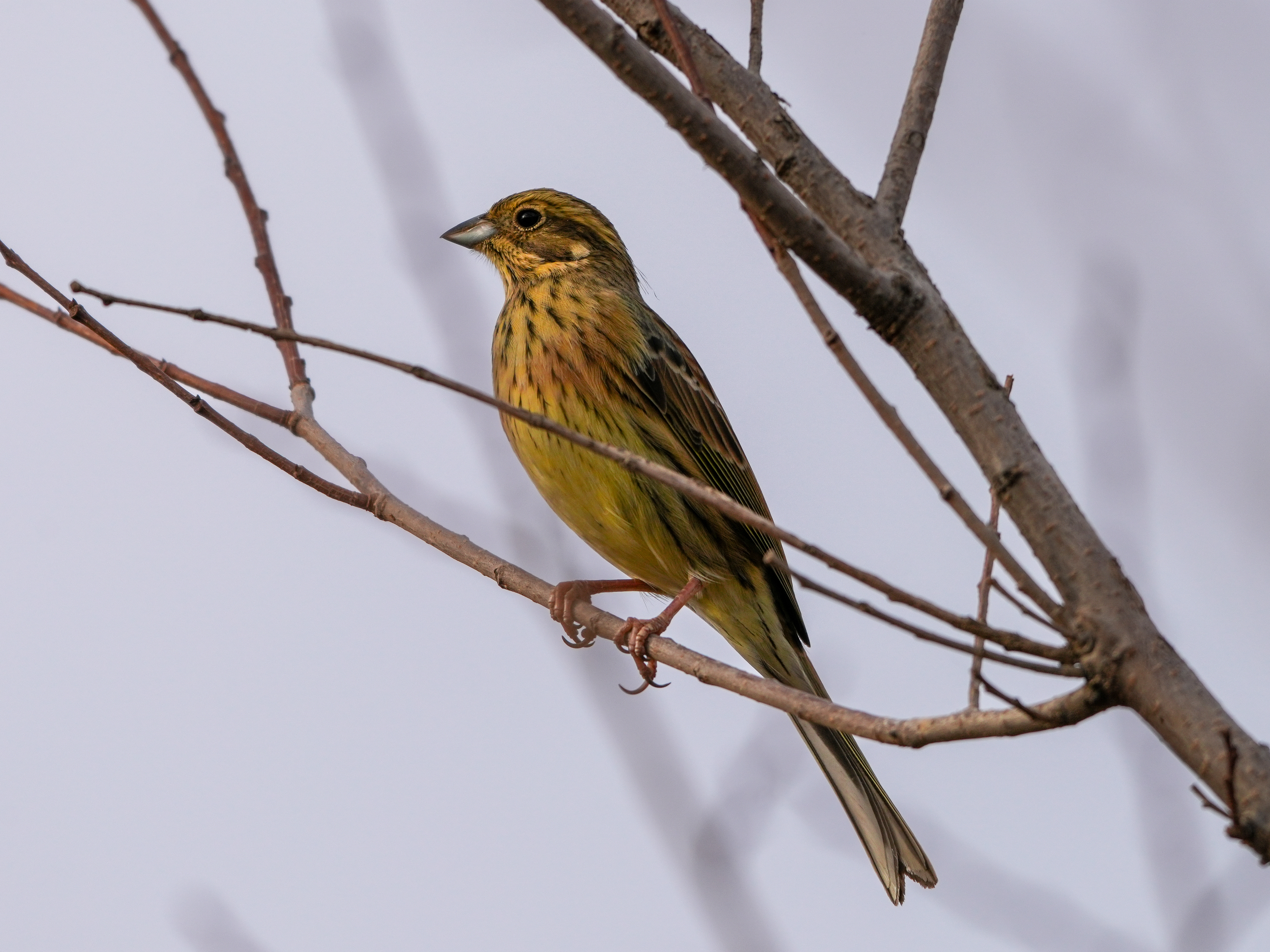
Cirl bunting (Emberiza cirlus) female

== See also ==
- Tazekka National Park
