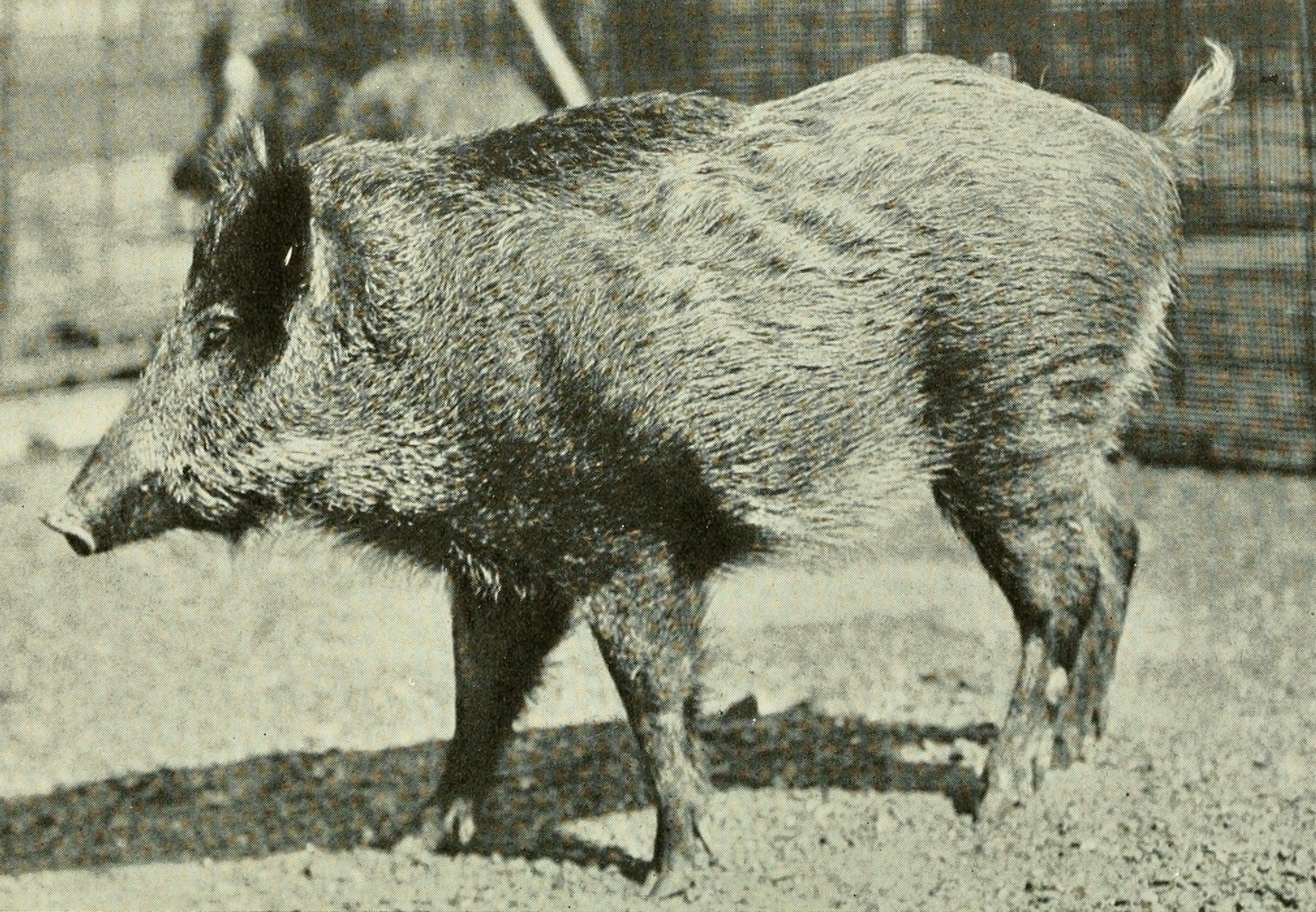

Scientific classification
- Kingdom: Animalia
- Phylum: Chordata
- Class: Mammalia
- Order: Artiodactyla
- Family: Suidae
- Genus: Sus
- Species: S. scrofa
- Subspecies: S. s. algira

Trinomial name
- Sus scrofa algira Loche, 1867

Synonyms
- Species synonymy: Sus scrofa barbarus (Sclater, 1860); Sus scrofa sahariensis (Heim de Balzac, 1937)

= North African boar =

Barbary wild boar

Species of wild boar

The Barbary wild boar (Sus scrofa algira) is a smaller subspecies of wild boar native to North Africa including Morocco, Algeria and Tunisia. It is a prey animal for past and present predators of the Atlas Mountains, such as striped hyenas, Atlas bears, African leopards and Barbary lions.

Genetically, it is closely related to European wild boars. It is speculated to have arrived in North Africa from Europe through the Strait of Gibraltar either naturally or through anthropogenic means sometime during the Late Pleistocene when the distance between the two landmasses was shorter, islands were present in between, and ocean currents were calmer.

== See also ==
- Sus scrofa
