= Friouato Caves =

Caves near the city of Taza, Morocco

Coordinates: 34°13′N 4°01′W

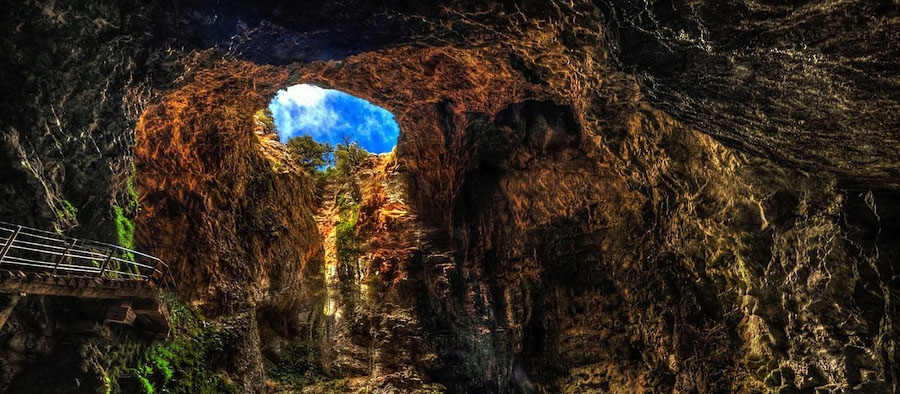

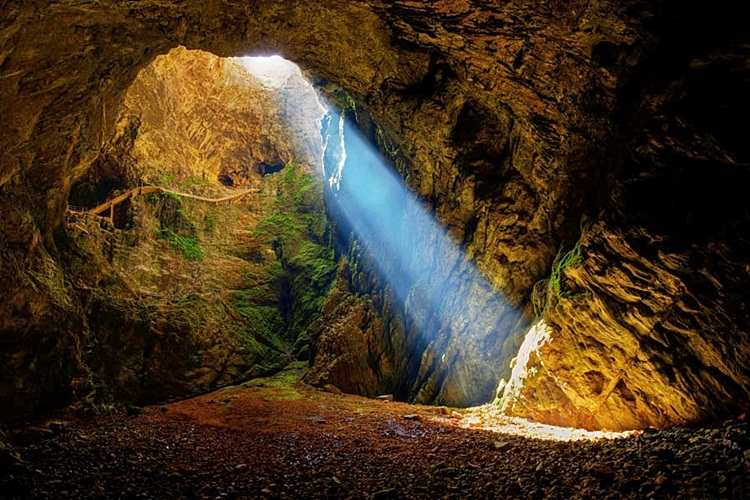
Cave interior

The Friouato Caves (Arabic: مغارة فريواطو), also known as Gouffre de Friouato, are located about 30 km south of the city of Taza, Morocco. The furthest explored known point is about 271 m (889 ft) deep, with a length of 2,178 m (7,146 ft). The cave system has a rich collection of chambers, narrow tunnels, and natural bridges, full of stalactites and stalagmites.. There are signs of an underground river believed to flow near the Grottes of Chiker. People of the nearby village say that there have been multiple explorers visiting the cave, some of whom never came back. A cave diving expedition by Exeter University Speleological Society passed two static sumps in 1969 to discover more large chambers and shafts. The system ends in a massive choke of boulders. This may well be the same massive choke of boulders that can be seen at the end of the upstream passages of the nearby Grotte du Chiker; this choke was also discovered in 1969 by the same group of cavers. Images of both cave systems were taken in 1976 during an expedition by the Cerberus Speleological Society from the UK.

At lower levels, the temperature is constant between 12–14 °C (54–57 °F) and the high humidity results in condensation on the walls. These climatic conditions support rare plant and animal species in the chasm.

Since spring 2016, the cave has been closed to visitors due to safety reasons.

== Explorers ==
Although many have come to explore and visit this cave, it is worth noting that the youngest explorer, according to the official guide there, is the girl Oumaima Ouballa at the age of 8 around the year 2010.
