= Tourism in South Sudan =

Despite high potential for tourism, especially ecotourism, tourism in South Sudan remains a small industry. The country is home to the world's second largest animal migration, six national parks, and 10 game reserves.

== Industry ==
The tourism industry makes up a small share of the GDP of South Sudan, only 1.8% as of 2013. According to a report by the World Travel and Tourism Council, the contribution of the travel and tourism in GDP is expected to grow to 4.1% by the year 2024. Juba International Airport, the largest airport in South Sudan, has expanded from no international airlines operating in it in 2005 to 32 operating there in 2015.

== Advisories ==
The US State Department warns US citizens against visiting South Sudan due to continued armed conflicts in the country. As per an advisory published in December 2015, the US embassy in South Sudan is unable to provide any required assistance to US citizens in or outside Juba due to lack of the basic infrastructure and security threats outside the embassy. Canadian and British advisories also recommend to avoid all travel to South Sudan and border areas, and they also warn about their inability to provide assistance to their citizens in South Sudan.

== Attractions ==
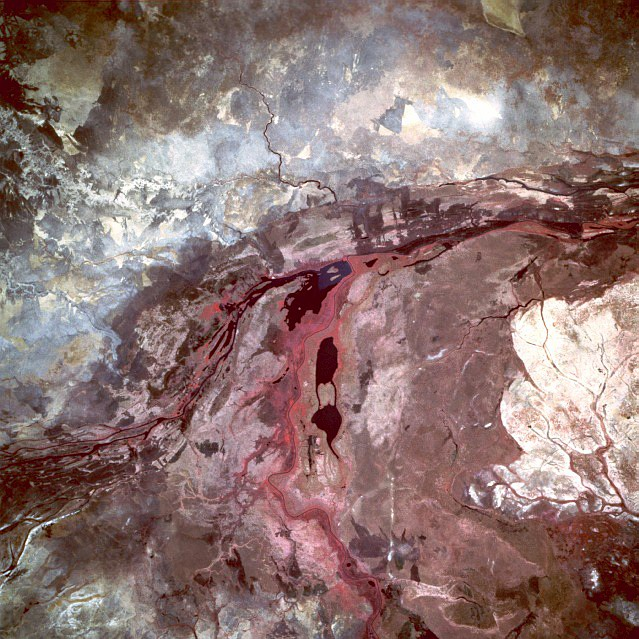
Sudd Swamp from space, May 1993.

There is no UNESCO recognized World Heritage Site in South Sudan. However, South Sudan has 14 national parks/protected areas and the world's second largest animal migration. According to the Times of Malta, "South Sudan has the world's second largest animal migration, an epic migration of the antelopes, but there is not a single tourist to see it". Boma National Park is as big as Rwanda. Other major parks includes, Bandingilo National Park, Lantoto National Park, Nimule National Park, Shambe National Park, and Southern National Park. There are also several game reserves including Ez Zeraf Game Reserve, Ashana Game Reserve, Bengangai Game Reserve, Bire Kpatuos Game Reserve, Chelkou Game Reserve, Fanyikang Game Reserve, Juba Game Reserve, Kidepo Game Reserve, Mbarizunga Game Reserve, and Numatina Game Reserve.

South Sudan is also known for its vast swamp region of the Sudd, an area 320 km wide and 400 km long. It is known as one of the largest wetlands in the world and nearly 400 species of birds can be found there.

Fine dining is primarily found in the capital city, Juba, and within hotels.

== See also ==
- Visa policy of South Sudan
- Wildlife of South Sudan
- Culture of South Sudan
