= Wildlife of South Sudan =

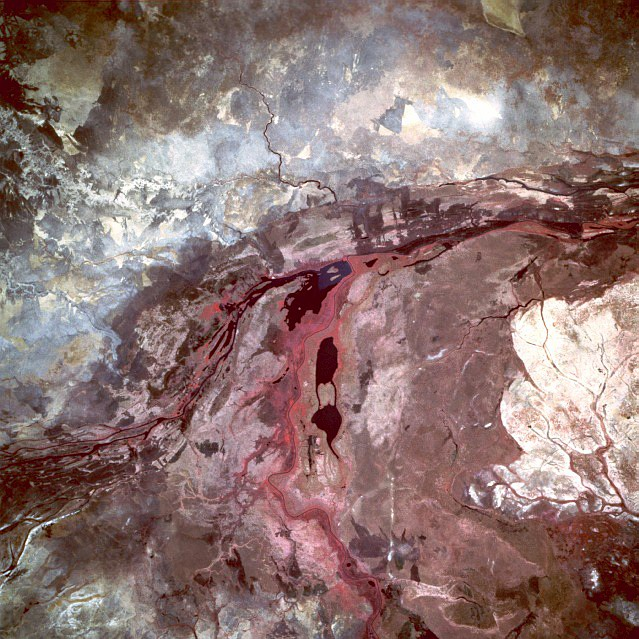
Sudd swamps observed from space

The wildlife of South Sudan refers to the natural flora and fauna of South Sudan. South Sudan includes the Sudd, one of the world's largest wetlands. According to the American biologist and conservationist, J. Michael Fay, South Sudan "could present the biggest migration of large mammals on earth", while Wildlife Conservation Society (WCS) reports southeast Sudan has a migration of 1.3 million antelopes. The region has a low density human population, with approximately 7 million people spread over approximately 619,745 km^{2} (239,285 sq mi).

== Avifauna ==
Bird species recorded in the flooded grasslands of Southern Sudan are the black crowned crane (Balearica pavonina), pink-backed pelican (Pelecanus rufescens), cattle egret (Bubulcus ibis) and saddle-billed stork (Ephippiorhynchus senegalensis).

== Conservation ==
In 2005, the Wildlife Conservation Society, an international NGO, established a collaborative project with the Government of Southern Sudan to create a workforce for the purpose for specific projects. The first initiative undertaken in 2007 was an aerial survey to assess the wildlife population in Southern Sudan.

Map of conservation areas of South Sudan

The UNEP has concluded that putting an end to bushmeat hunting is not workable, and proposed the establishment of a system of sustainable harvesting that would involve the local communities who would have the major responsibility caring for these resources.

=== Protected areas ===
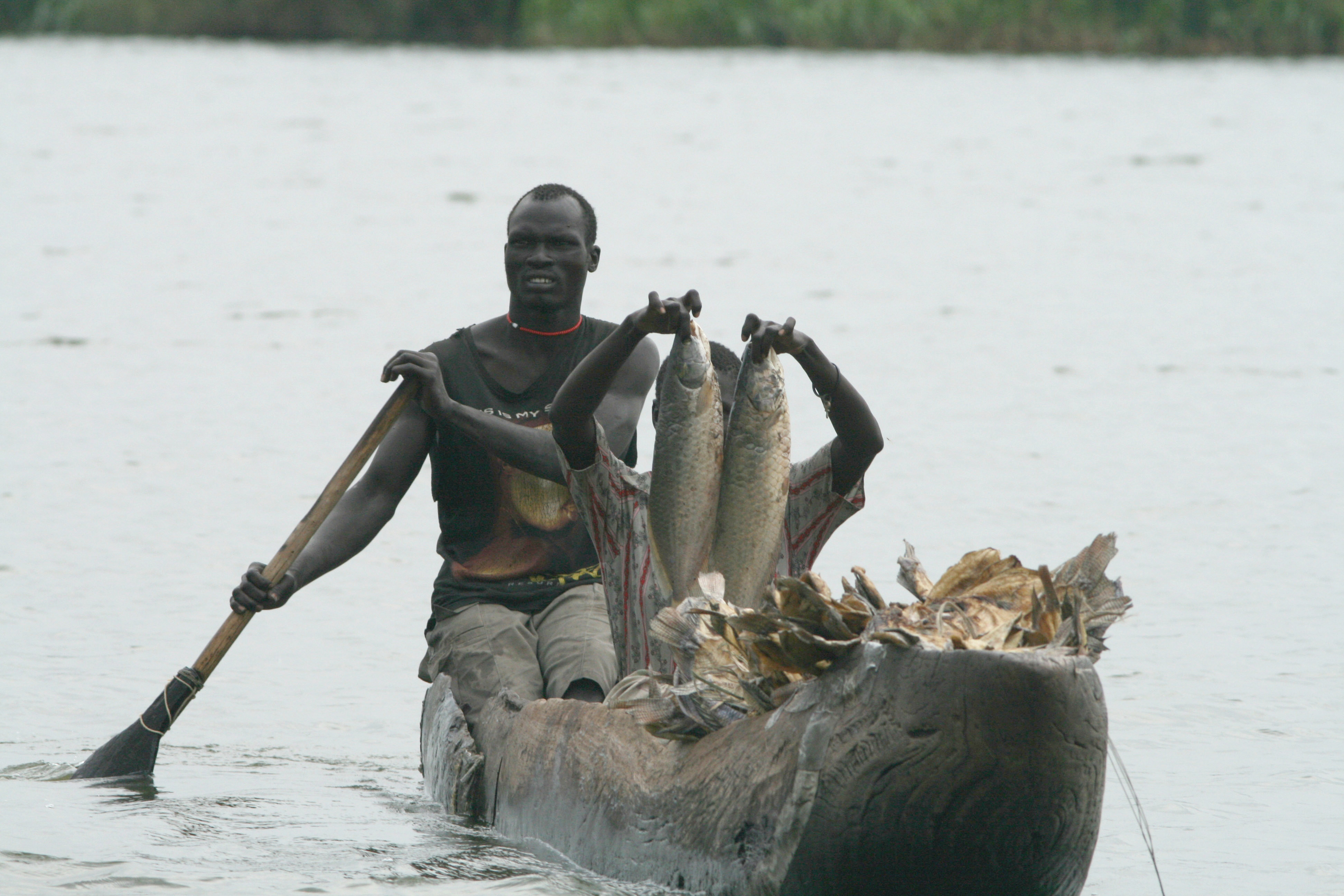
Fishing in the Sudd Wetland, one of the largest wetlands in the world

The total area under protection is around 143,000 km^{2} (55,000 sq mi) spread over 23 protected areas which account for 15% of the South Sudanese territory. The largest protected area is the Sudd Wetland, which is an important bird life area covering 57,000 km^{2} (22,000 sq mi). It is also a Ramsar Site with over 400 bird species, 100 mammal species, and 100 fish species. Many of the protected areas are exploited for illegal hunting and rearing of livestock.

South Sudan's protected areas are in the flood plains of the Nile River. The habitat predominantly comprises grasslands, high-altitude plateaus and escarpments, wooded and grassy savannas, floodplains and wetlands. Some of the other protected areas are the Boma National Park in the Boma-Jonglei Landscape region, an oil rich area on the eastern border with Ethiopia; the Southern National Park bordering Democratic Republic of the Congo; the Bandingilo National Park (including Mongalla)–8,400 km^{2} (3,200 sq mi); Nimule National Park–410 km^{2} (160 sq mi); and Shambe National Park, an important bird area–620 km^{2} (240 sq mi).

There are several protected game reserves. The Ez Zeraf Game Reserve (9,700 km^{2} (3,700 sq mi)) is located in the expansive swamplands and the seasonally flooded grasslands. Other game reserves are: Ashana Game Reserve–900 km^{2} (350 sq mi); Bengangai Game Reserve, an important bird area–170 km^{2} (66 sq mi); Bire Kpatuos Game Reserve–5,000 km^{2} (1,900 sq mi); Chelkou Game Reserve–5,500 km^{2} (2,100 sq mi); Fanyikang Game Reserve (part of Ramsar Site)–480 km^{2} (190 sq mi); Juba Game Reserve–200 km^{2} (77 sq mi); Kidepo Game Reserve–1,200 km^{2} (460 sq mi); Mbarizunga Game Reserve–10 km^{2} (3.9 sq mi); and Numatina Game Reserve–2,100 km^{2} (810 sq mi).

Other protected areas include

- Imatong Mountains, an important bird and natural conservation area–1,000 km^{2} (390 sq mi)
- Lake Ambadi, a natural conservation area–1,500 km^{2} (580 sq mi)
- Lake No, a natural conservation area–1,000 km^{2} (390 sq mi).

There are at least three proposed protected areas: Lantoto National Park–760 km^{2} (290 sq mi), Mashra Game Reserve–4,500 km^{2} (1,700 sq mi), and Boro Game Reserve–1,500 km^{2} (580 sq mi).

=== Threats ===
Bushmeat is cheaper than beef, fish or chicken in many wildlife areas of South Sudan, and hence is exploited as a food source and also for trading. As a result, wild animals such as white-eared kob, tiang and Mongalla gazelle are hunted in large numbers (according to an evaluation of results from a sample survey of a few villages in the Boma National Park). This has created pressure on the wildlife of the park that necessitates effective conservation measures. Internal wars which lasted for two decades have also been a cause for lack of effective management of the protected areas. Even though the military control of the area provided some degree of protection, hunting for bushmeat continued. The wildlife protection forces were reported to be hardly adequate considering the large number of protected areas which has resulted in extensive exploitation of wildlife by poaching; extensive surveys carried out in the Boma National Park confirmed this situation. Another factor that poses threat to wildlife in South Sudan is encroachment on the savannah land areas for cultivation.

Planned development activities, particularly those for roads in the protected areas, are infringing on the migration routes of the white-eared kob. Wildlife rangers (a force of 7,300 men which was created from the disbanded armed men after the conflict ended, as of 2006) are also in conflict with the local pastoralists and poachers; this has been particularly noted in the Boma National Park.

=== Legislation ===
The Wildlife Conservation Directorate of the Government of South Sudan (GOSS) and the Ministry of Environment, Wildlife Conservation and Tourism share the mandate for the management of the wildlife and the protected areas South Sudan. As of 2011, there is no legislation on wildlife and protected area management from GOSS as, although there is some funding available, the fledgling government departments suffer from shortages of facilities, materials and skilled workers. A Commission on Wildlife set up by the Sudan People's Liberation Movement had formerly provided some direction to areas under its control.

== Bibliography ==
- UNEP. "Wildlife and Protected Area Management" (PDF). Archived from the original (pdf) on 18 September 2017.
