= List of protected areas of South Sudan =

The protected areas of South Sudan include national parks, game reserves, forest reserves, nature conservation areas, and bird sanctuaries. Protected areas cover 15.5% of the country's land area.

== National parks ==
- Bandingilo National Park
- Boma National Park
- Lantoto National Park
- Nimule National Park
- Shambe National Park
- Southern National Park

== Game reserves ==
- Ashana Game Reserve
- Bengangai Game Reserve
- Bire Kpatuos Game Reserve
- Chelkou Game Reserve
- Ez Zeraf Game Reserve
- Fanyikang Game Reserve
- Juba Game Reserve
- Kidepo Game Reserve
- Mbarizunga Game Reserve
- Numatina Game Reserve

== Forest reserves ==
- Imatong Forest Reserve

== Bird sanctuaries ==
- Lake Abiad Bird Sanctuary

== International designations ==
=== Ramsar Sites ===
- Sudd
