= L. niloticus =

L. niloticus may refer to:

- Labeo niloticus, the Nile carp, a fish species distributed along the entire Nile valley
- Lates niloticus, the Nile perch, a freshwater fish species found in Africa
