= Zufari: Ride into Africa! =

Off-road safari trail Jeep ride

ZUFARI: Ride into Africa!

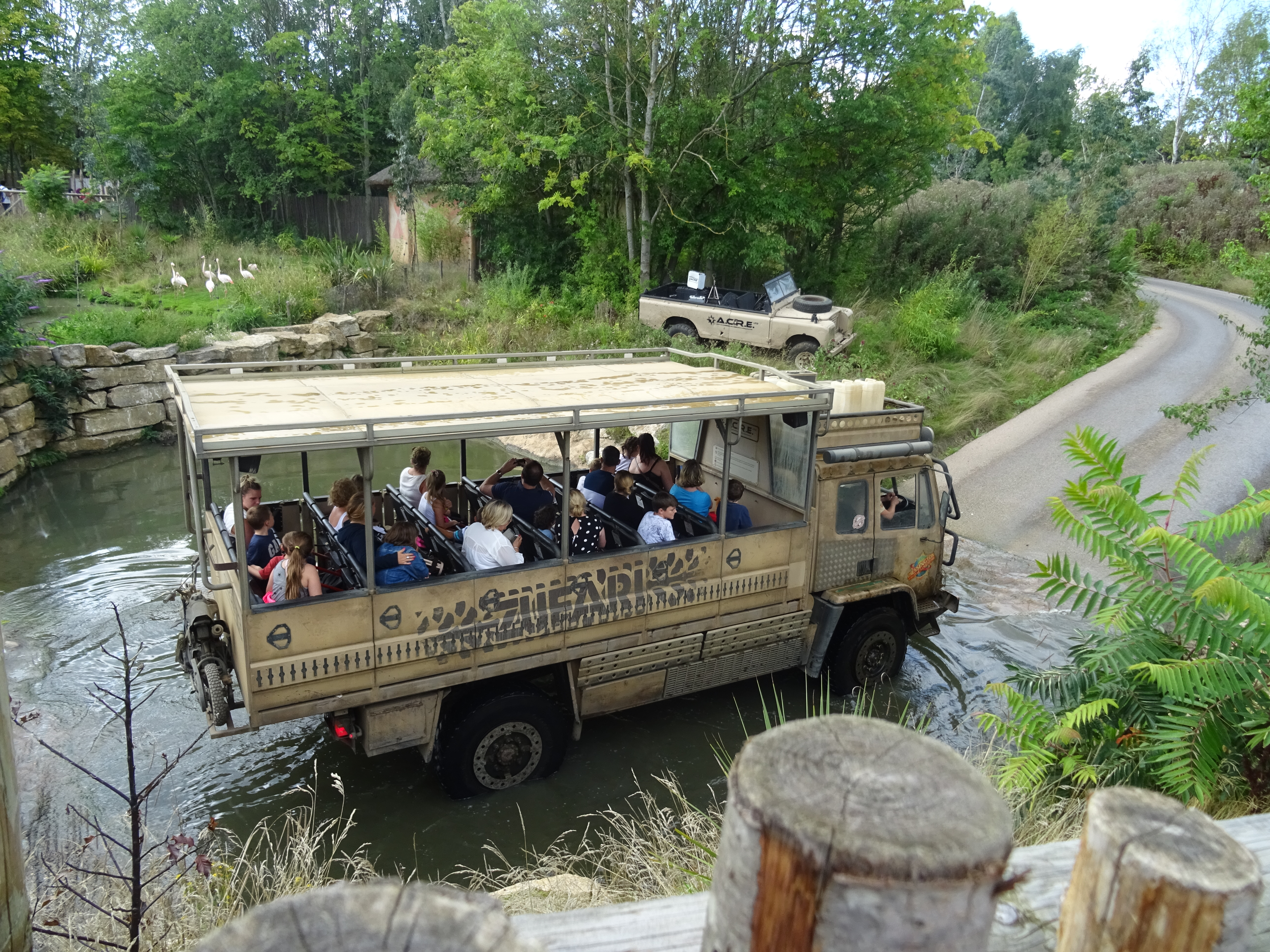

Chessington World of Adventures
- Area: ZUFARI
- Coordinates: 51.3502°N 0.3178°W
- Status: Operating
- Cost: £8,000,000
- Opening date: 27 March 2013

Ride statistics
- Designer: Merlin Magic Making
- Capacity: 1,120 riders per hour
- Vehicles: 5
- Rows: 6
- Riders per row: 5
- Duration: 8 minutes
- Height restriction: 100 cm (3 ft 3 in)
- Reserve and Ride available
- Wheelchair accessible
- Must transfer from wheelchair

Zufari: Ride into Africa (officially stylized as ZUFARI: Ride into Africa!) is an off-road safari attraction located at Chessington World of Adventures in Greater London, United Kingdom. The ride traverses a 22-acre site meticulously landscaped to replicate an African reserve, where guests board off-road vehicles to view a variety of species, including giraffes, white rhinos, ostriches, blesbok, and Nile lechwe.

== Ride history ==
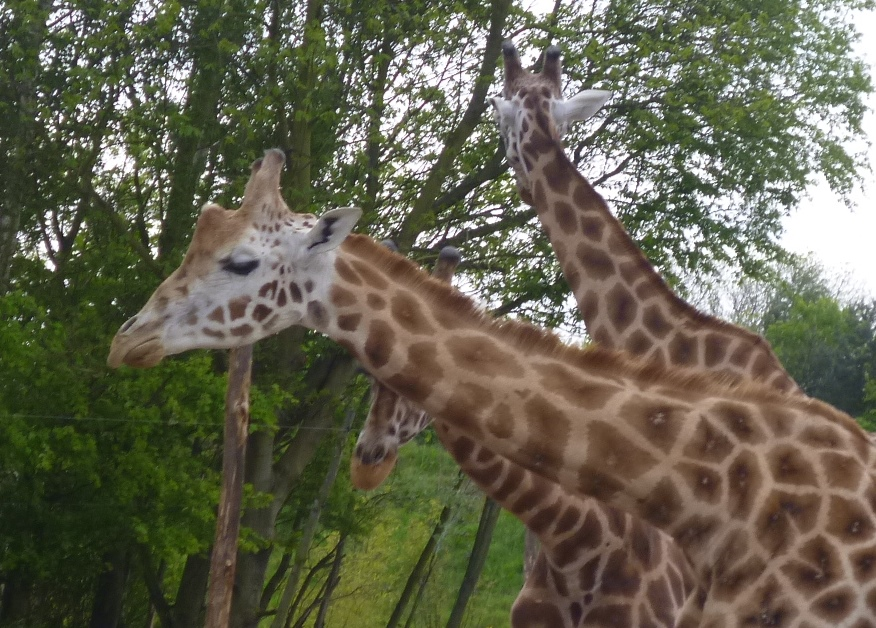
Giraffe on Zufari

=== Construction ===
In 2009, development began on a five-year strategic plan designed to establish a "Wild Adventure" brand identity for the resort. Scheduled to run from 2010 through 2015, the initiative featured a centerpiece safari attraction situated behind the onsite hotels. The rebranding launched in 2010 with the opening of Wild Asia, followed by the retheming of ToyTown in 2012. Plans for Zufari were submitted and approved that same year, with landscape construction commencing in September 2012.

As part of the investment, the pre-existing Flying Jumbos were relocated to the area to add attractions to the new themed land.

Development of the Zufari site began in June 2010 with the opening of the Wanyama Reserve, an African-themed zoological area. In March 2013, Chessington officially launched the Zufari attraction and its expanded African landscape, effectively merging the pre-existing Wanyama Reserve into the new, unified territory.

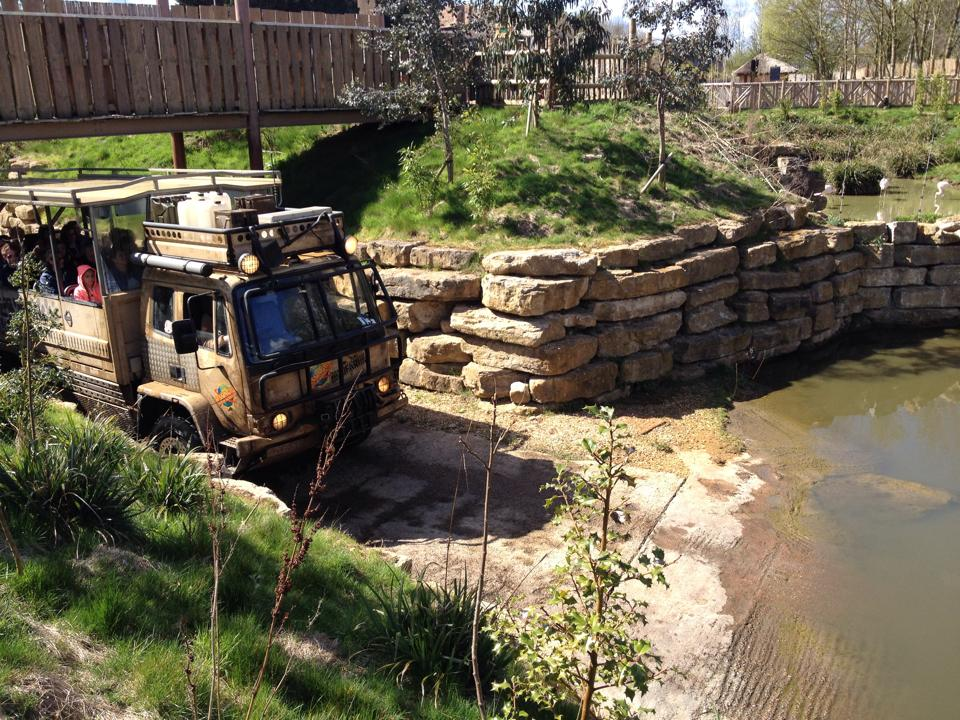
Ride Truck

=== Promotion ===
Zufari served as the central focus of the park’s marketing throughout 2013, supported by a national television advertising campaign that ran for the duration of the season. During the construction phase, a dedicated promotional mini-site was launched to provide details on the attraction's layout and the featured animal species. Leading up to the official opening, the park hosted an "African Adventures" event where one of the off-road transport vehicles was displayed in the zoo alongside signage encouraging guests to "embark in 2013." Promotional efforts also included the release of several online videos documenting the transportation of animals and the large-scale landscaping of the site.

In the Summer of 2013, Chessington created a PR stunt to gain the ride more attention. It involved banning animal print clothing being worn by guests on Zufari. The stunt proved successful, and the summer season was one of the busiest since 2008. The banning rule was not enforced.

== Description ==
The attraction is themed around the African Conservation Research and Exploration (A.C.R.E.) team, a fictional organisation that has discovered a previously unknown region dubbed "ZUFARI."

Guests traverse the reserve’s terrain to observe various animal species while listening to an educational commentary provided by A.C.R.E. researcher Chase Van-Driver. The experience concludes with a scripted encounter near the rhino habitat, where a fallen tree obstructs the primary path, forcing the transport vehicle to divert through a "dangerous cave." This finale incorporates water effects, including a passage through a waterfall; although the vehicles are roofed, passengers seated at the ends of each row may be splashed during this sequence.

== Gallery ==
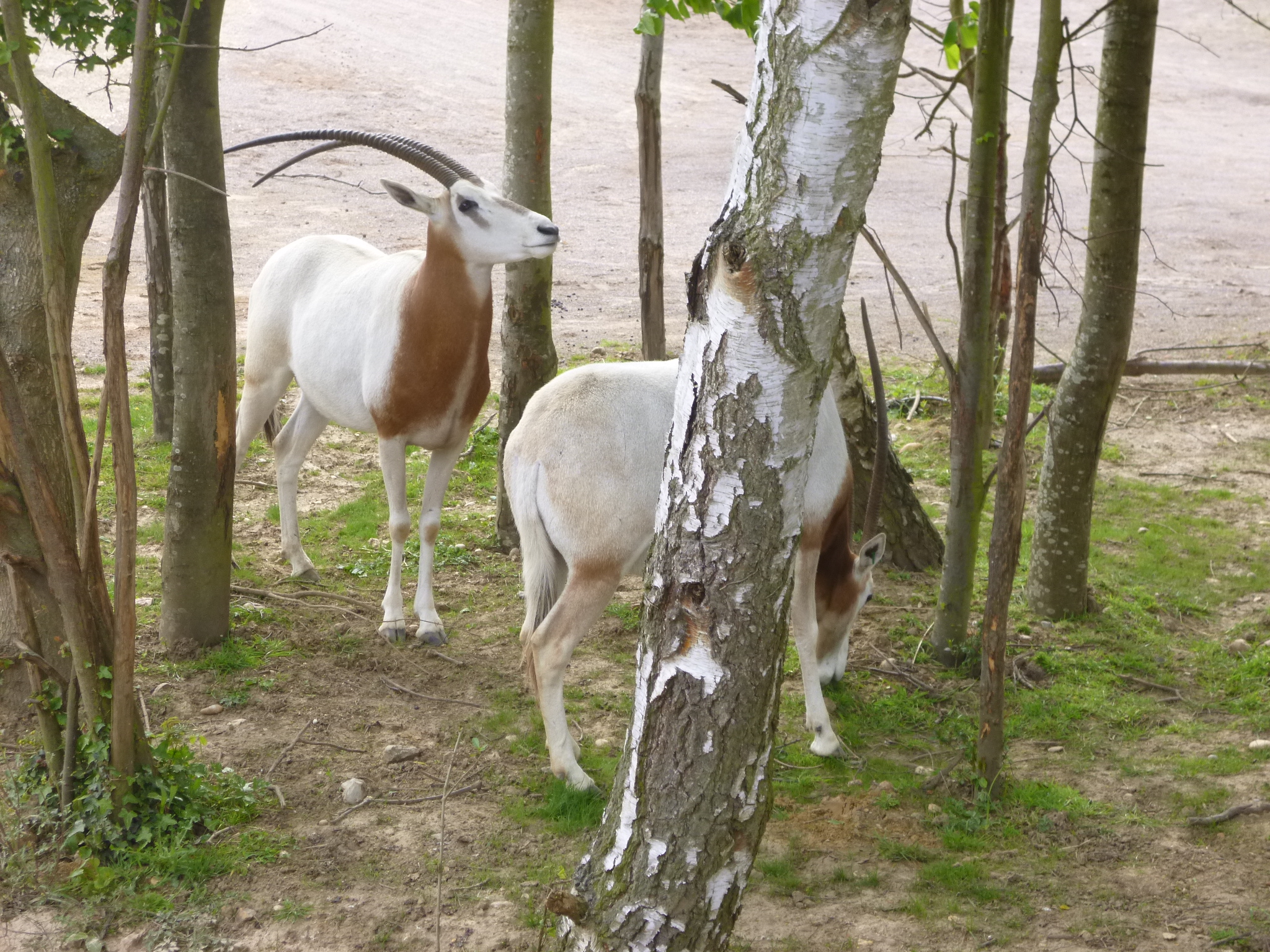
Scimitar Horned Oryx on Zufari

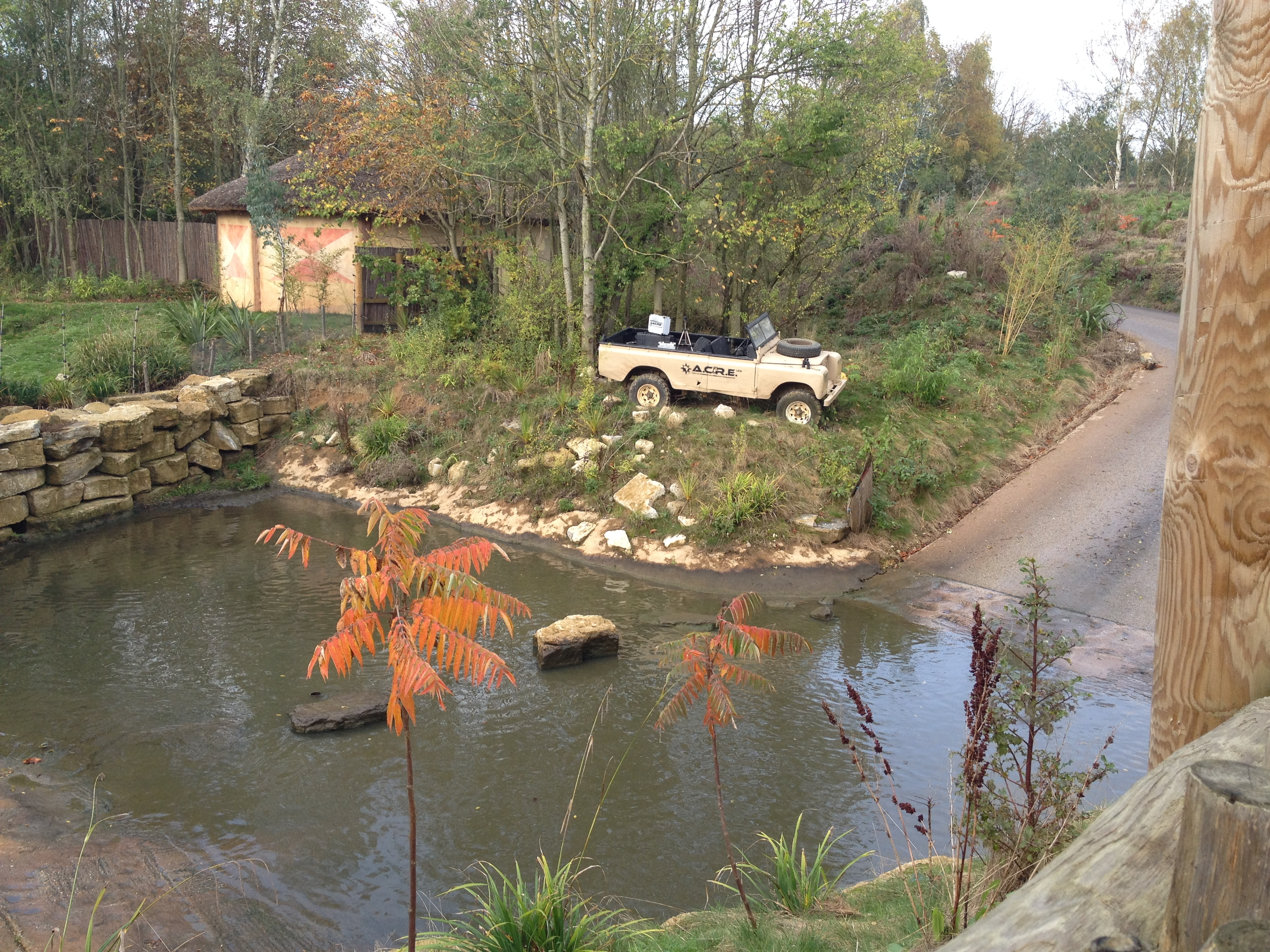
Flamingo enclosure landscaping

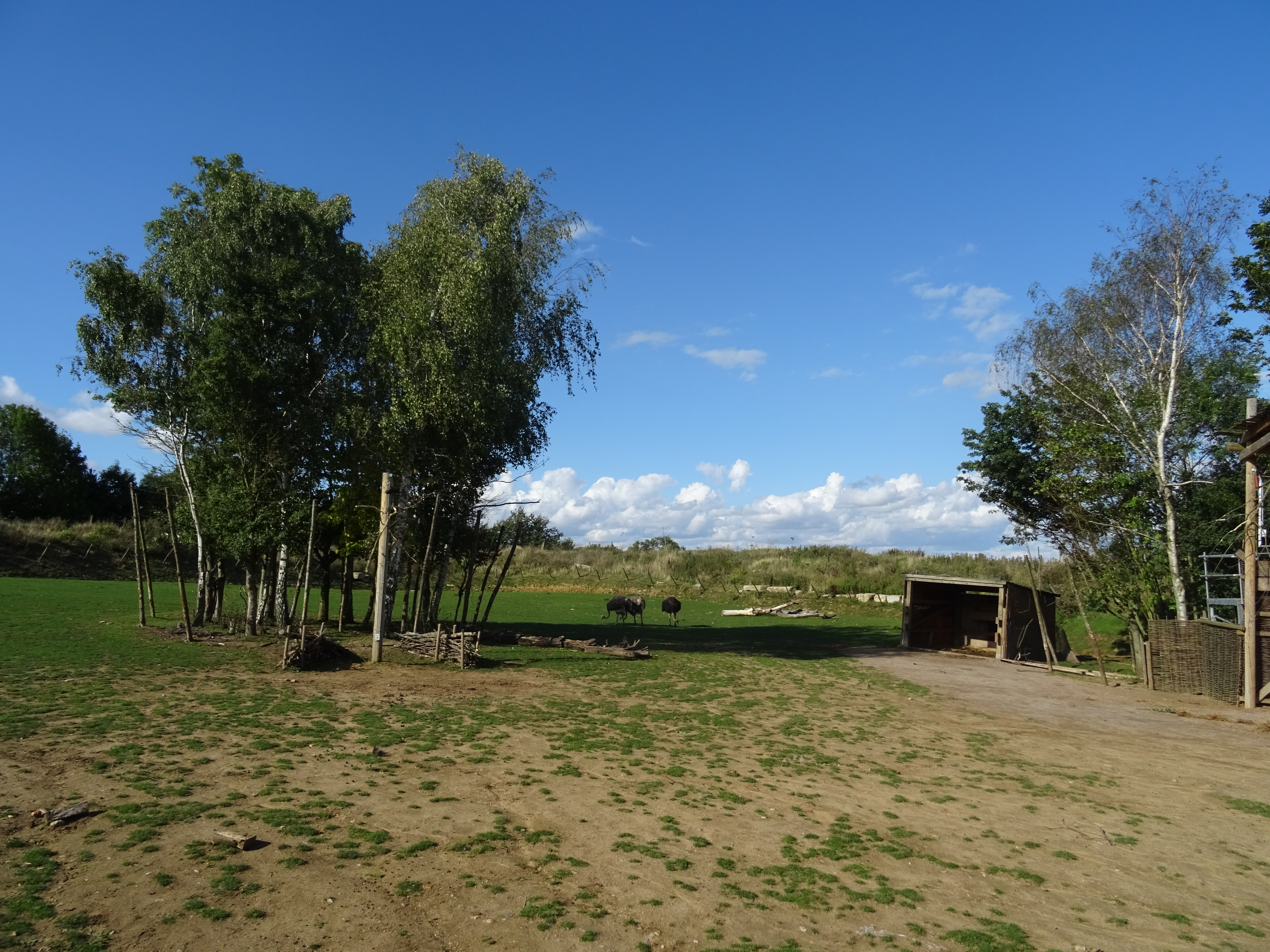
Giraffe Enclosure

== See also ==
- Chessington Zoo
