= Mongalla =

Mongalla may refer to:

- Mongala, one of the 21 provinces of the Democratic Republic of the Congo
- Mongala District, an administrative region of the Democratic Republic of Congo
- Mongalla, South Sudan, a community in South Sudan
- Mongalla Game Reserve, a nearby game reserve in South Sudan
- Mongalla gazelle, a species of gazelle found in the floodplain and savanna of eastern South Sudan
- Mongalla free-tailed bat, a bat found in dry and wet savannah regions of Africa
