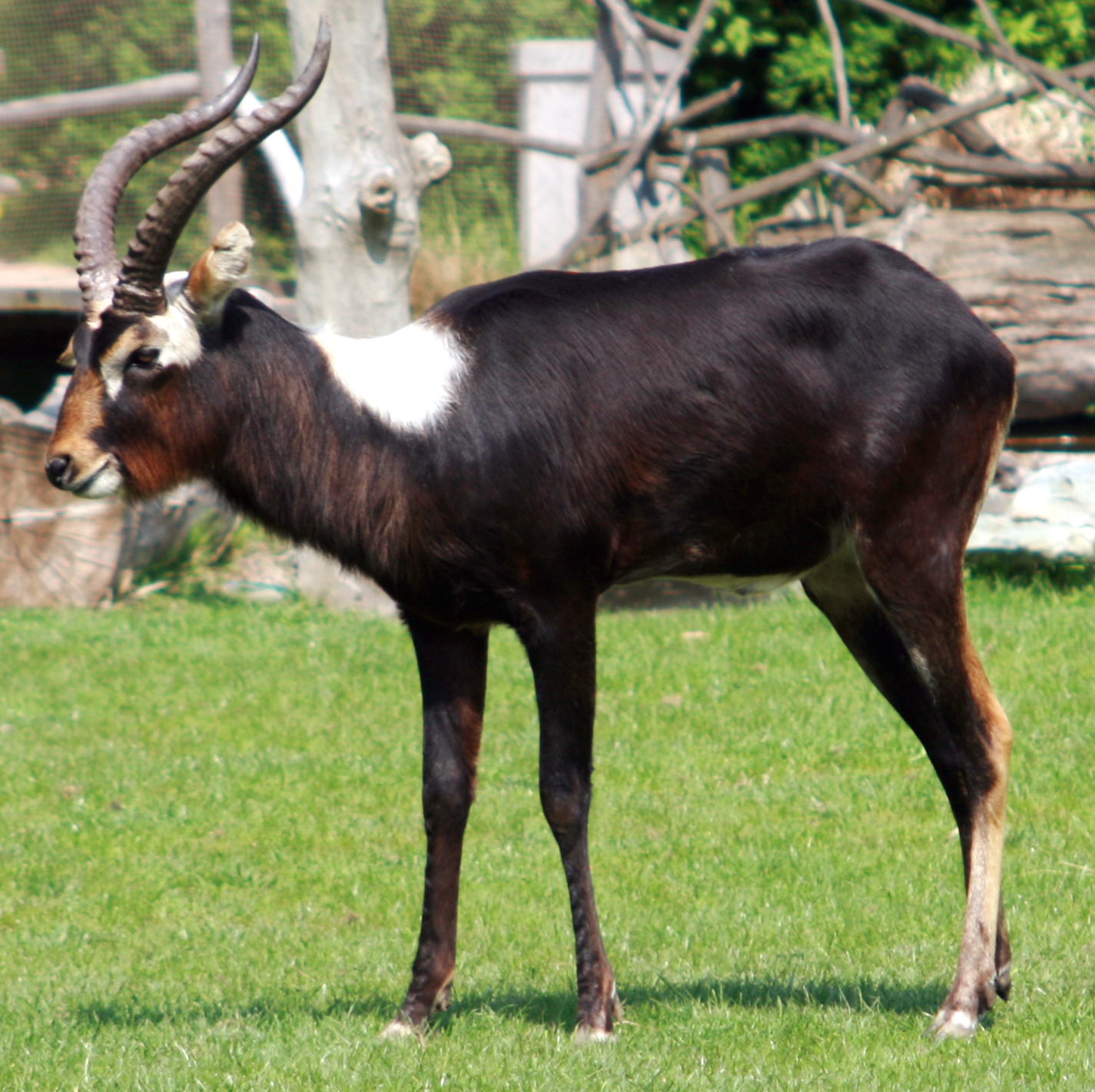
- Male
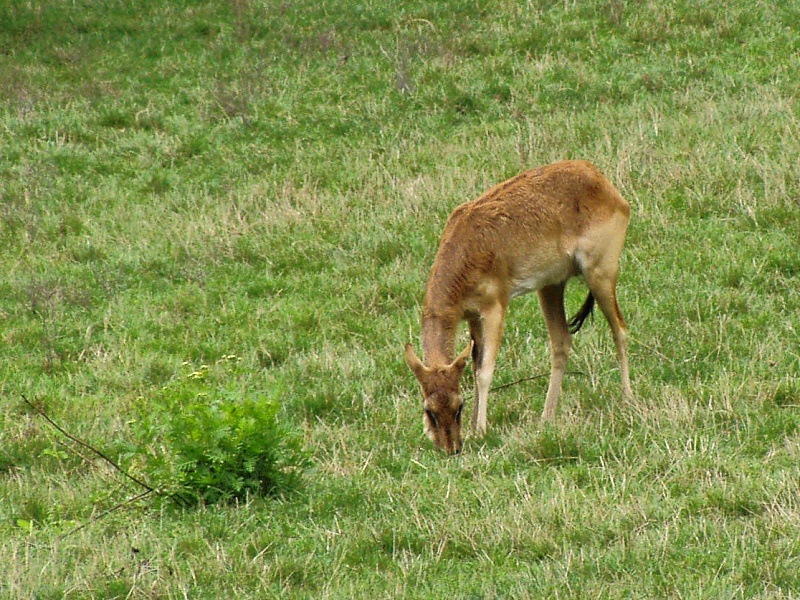
- Female; Both at the Prague Zoo, Czech Republic

Conservation status
- Endangered (IUCN 3.1)

Scientific classification
- Kingdom: Animalia
- Phylum: Chordata
- Class: Mammalia
- Infraclass: Placentalia
- Order: Artiodactyla
- Family: Bovidae
- Genus: Kobus
- Species: K. megaceros

Binomial name
- Kobus megaceros (Fitzinger, 1855)

Synonyms
- Onotragus megaceros; Kobus maria

= Nile lechwe =

Species of antelope

The Nile lechwe or Mrs Gray's lechwe (Kobus megaceros) is an endangered species of antelope found in swamps and grasslands in South Sudan and Ethiopia.

== Description ==
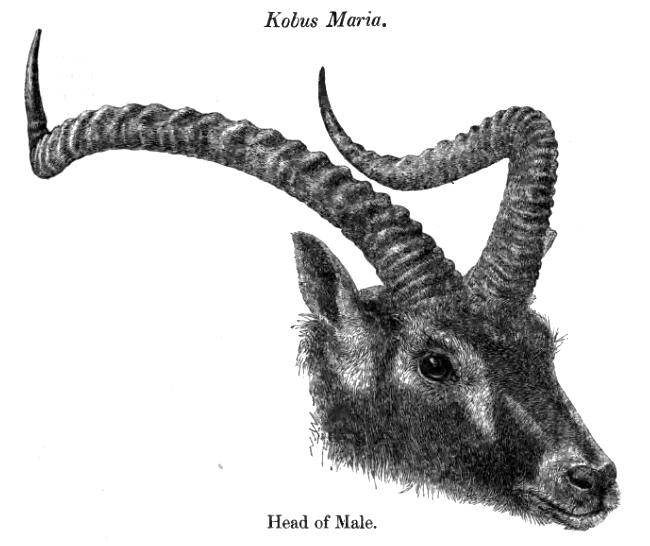
Head from the description by Gray as Kobus maria

Males are an average of 165 cm (65 in) long and 100–105 cm (39–41 in) tall at the shoulders, and weigh between 90 and 120 kg (200 and 260 lb), while females are an average of 135 cm (53 in) long, 80–85 cm (31–33 in) tall at the shoulders, and weigh 60–90 kg (130–200 lb). Nile lechwes live an average of 10 to 11.5 years, and most uncommonly 19 years.

Their coats are shaggy with the hair on the cheeks particularly long in both sexes, and males may have even longer hair on their necks. Nile lechwe exhibit extreme sexual dimorphism. Females are golden-brown with white underbellies and no horns. Juveniles also have a golden-brown coat, but the color changes to dark brown in young males when they reach two to three years of age. Adult males are blackish-brown to russet with white 'hoods' over their shoulders and small white patches over their eyes. The horns of the adult males are 50–87 cm (20–34 in) long, strongly ridged at their bases and are curved at the tips.

== Ecology ==
Nile lechwe can visually signal and vocalize to communicate with each other. They rear high in the air in front of their opponents and turn their heads to the side while displaying. Females are quite loud, making a toad-like croaking when moving. When fighting, males duck their heads and use their horns to push against each other. If one male is significantly smaller than the other, he may move next to the larger male in a parallel position and push from there, which prevents the larger male from pushing with all his force. Known predators are humans, lions, crocodiles, cheetahs, wild dogs, hyenas and leopards. They flee to water if disturbed, but females defend their offspring from smaller predators by direct attack, mainly kicking, if a male is cornered he will use his metre long horns to defend himself. Yearling Nile lechwes are often infected by warble flies, which can make them unhealthy and result in high mortality rates.

Nile lechwe are crepuscular, active in the early morning and late afternoon. They gather in herds of up to 50 females and one male or in smaller all-male herds. They divide themselves into three social groups: females and their new offspring, bachelor males, and mature males with territories. A males with territory sometimes allows a bachelor male into his territory to guard the region and not to copulate.

== Diet ==
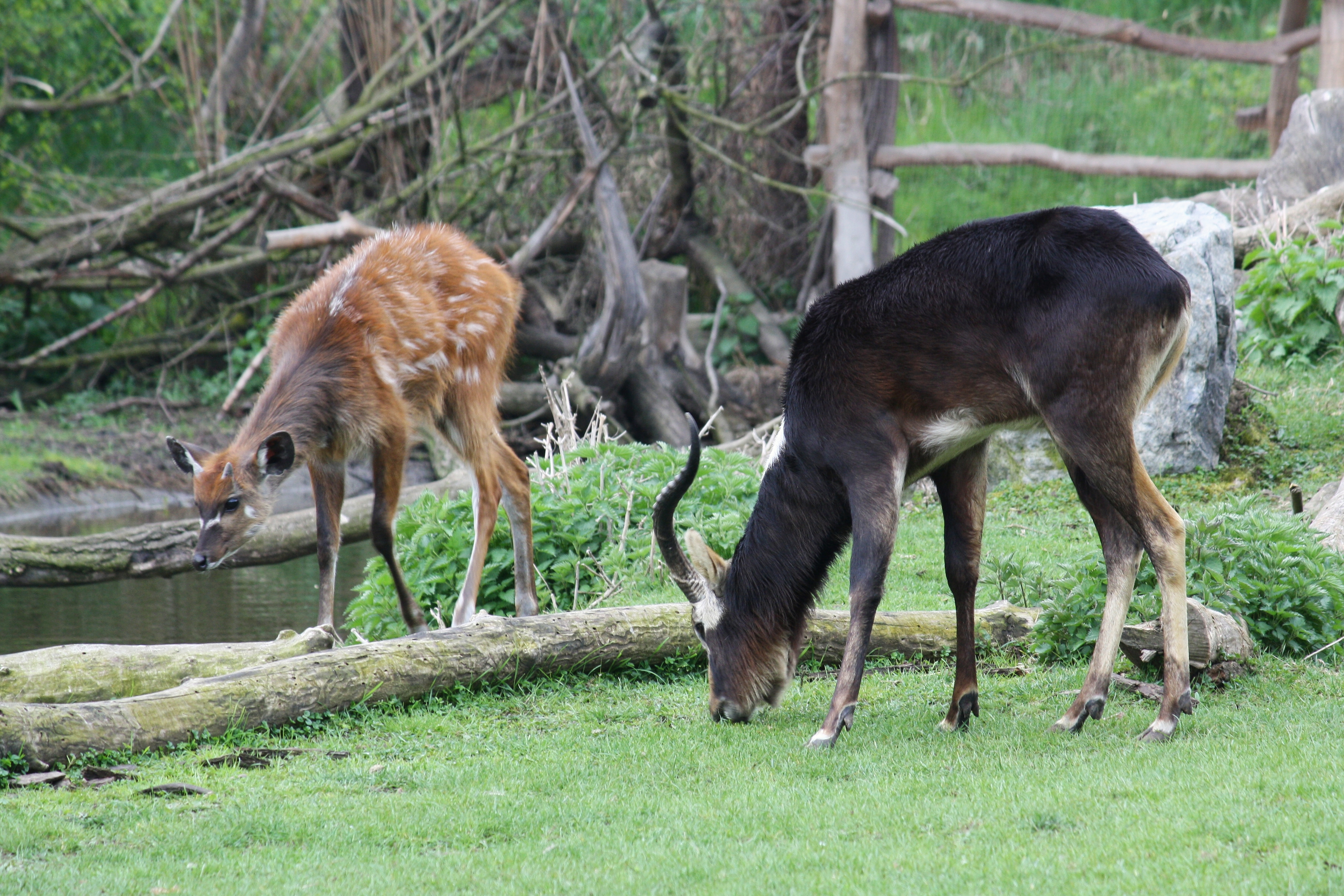
The main diet of the Nile lechwe mostly includes grasses. Here, a male (blackish) together with a sitatunga.

Nile lechwe feed on succulent grasses and water plants. Wild rice is thought to be a preferred food at the start of the flood season, while a larger proportion of swamp grasses are consumed when the waters recede. They have the special capability to wade in shallow waters and swim in deeper waters, and may feed on young leaves from trees and bushes, rearing up to reach this green vegetation. Nile lechwe are also found in marshy areas, where they eat aquatic plants.

== Reproduction ==
Both sexes reach sexual maturity when they are two years old. Mating occurs throughout the year, but peaks between February and May. During mating season, young males bend their horns to the ground as if to poke the earth. Males fight in the water, their heads submerging in horn-to-horn combat, for dominance. These contests are usually short and violent. As in many other animals, the dominant male copulates with the female. A unique form of marking is seen with the start of mating. The male bends his head to the ground and urinates on his throat and cheek hair. He then rubs his dripping beard on the female's forehead and rump.

The gestation period is seven to nine months long on average, after which a single calf is born. Infants weigh about 4.5 to 5.5 kg (9.9–12.1 lb). Females experience estrus again about a month after producing young. After its birth, the calf is kept hidden in thick vegetation for two to three weeks, where the mother nurses it. It is weaned at five to six months, and a few months later is ready to be independent and join the herd.

== Habitat and distribution ==
The Nile lechwe typically occur in shallow waters bordering deeper swamps, where the water is 10–40 cm (3.9–15.7 in) deep. Nile lechwe are endemic to South Sudan and Ethiopia. In South Sudan, the majority of the population occurs in the Sudd swamps, and in the Machars near the Ethiopian border in smaller numbers. In Ethiopia occurs in the southwest, in Gambela National Park, but in very less numbers possibly due to human settlement and habitat degradation. The habitat of the Nile lechwe has been severely affected by civil wars, human displacement and resettlement, firearm attacks and increased hunting. Even its seasonal movements were restricted due to large populations of cattle in and around its range. The Nile lechwe population in the Sudds, however, remained somewhat stable throughout this period.

== Conservation ==
The Nile lechwe has been classified under the Endangered category by the International Union for Conservation of Nature and Natural Resources (IUCN). In 1983, aerial surveys gave a total population estimate of 30,000-40,000 individuals, of which 95 percent were concentrated in the Sudds and the rest occurred between Sudan and Ethiopia. In the 1980s, the population in the Machars was estimated at 900. A population of around 150 was also reported from the swamps in Gilo River in 1967. There is also an increasing population held in captivity. In 2007, the population of the Sudd region was estimated to be of 4,291 animals, indicating that the species has declined rapidly since the previous survey in 1983.

In South Sudan, Nile lechwe populations occur in three protected areas : Zeraf Game Reserve, that extends over 9,700 km^{2} (3,700 sq mi) along the Bahr el Zeraf; Fanyikang Game Reserve, north of Bahr el Ghazal, covering over 480 km^{2} (190 sq mi); and Shambe National Park, that stretches over 620 km^{2} (240 sq mi) along Bahr al Jabal. The Nile lechwe keep moving in and out of these areas. In Ethiopia they occur in the Gabella National Park. A study outlined priorities for both in situ and ex situ conservation of this species.
