= Visa policy of South Sudan =

Policy on permits required to enter South Sudan

Visitors to South Sudan must obtain an e-Visa unless they are of South Sudanese origin, are citizens from one of the visa-exempt countries, or are citizens who may obtain a visa on arrival.

== Visa policy map ==
Visa policy of South Sudan South Sudan Visa not required (indefinite period) Visa on arrival eVisa

== Visa exemption ==
Citizens of the following countries may enter South Sudan without a visa for an indefinite period:

- Kenya
- Tanzania
- Uganda

Date of visa changes
- Unknown: Uganda
- 1 August 2019: Tanzania
- 26 July 2021: Kenya

== Visa on arrival ==
Citizens of the following countries are eligible to obtain a visa on arrival:

- Burundi
- Rwanda

A visa is also granted on arrival to holders of an identity card copy issued by the United Nations with a clearance from the Ministry of Foreign Affairs in South Sudan.

Holders of diplomatic, official, service and special passports issued to nationals of any country can obtain a visa on arrival.

== Electronic visa (e-Visa) ==
Citizens of other countries and territories may obtain an e-Visa.

== See also ==
- Visa requirements for South Sudanese citizens
- Tourism in South Sudan
