= Ez Zeraf Game Reserve =

Protected area in South Sudan

- IUCN category VI (protected area with sustainable use of natural resources)
- Location within South Sudan Location within Africa
- Interactive map of Ez Zeraf Game Reserve
- Location: South Sudan
- Nearest city: Malakal
- Coordinates: 8°48′N 30°30′E
- Area: 8,000.0 square kilometres (800,000 ha)
- Established: 1939
- Governing body: South Sudan National Wildlife Service (SSWS)

Ez Zeraf Game Reserve is a 8,000.0 square kilometres (800,000 ha) protected area in northern South Sudan. It was designated in 1939 when the area was within Sudan.

Located within the Sudd Ramsar site, Ez Zeraf is an IUCN Category VI site with mostly seasonally flooded grassland and woodland landscape. It is internationally important for its large mammal concentrations. It was gazetted in 1939 along with Fanikang Game Reserve to protect Nile Lechwe and Sitatunga. It is also home to Hippopotamus.

A large portion of the reserve's area is on Zeraf Island, a seasonally flooded island area isolated by the White Nile to the West and the Bahr el Zeraf river to the east. Although the reserve extends eastwards of this island, some records call it the Zeraph Island Reserve and others state that this island was the primary target for protection. The name in general is derived from the Bahr el Zeraf and is popularly rendered simply as "Zeraf Game Reserve"
