= Kidepo Game Reserve =

South Sudanese game reserve

- IUCN category VI (protected area with sustainable use of natural resources)
- Location within South Sudan Location within Africa
- Interactive map of Kidepo Game Reserve
- Location: Ikotos and Budi counties, Eastern Equatoria, South Sudan
- Coordinates: 4°11′N 33°29′E
- Area: 1,200.0 square kilometres (120,000 ha)
- Designation: Game Reserve
- Designated: 1975
- Governing body: South Sudan National Wildlife Service (SSWS)

The Kidepo Game Reserve is a protected area located in Ikotos and Budi counties, Eastern Equatoria State, South Sudan, Africa. With an area of 1200 km^{2}, this reserve is located 4° 04'N and 33° 28'E on the South Sudan/Uganda border, where it forms a contiguous ecosystem with Uganda's Kidepo Valley National Park.

Three quarters of the Kidepo Game Reserve is in Bira Payam of Ikotos County and also part of Budi County, which is inhabited by the Ketebo, Didinga and Buya and the word "Kidepo" come from the Ketebo word "Kidebo", which mean "Help us". Sudan deployed some game rangers in Bira from 1976 to 1983, until civil war broke out in 1983.

== Flora and fauna ==
The 1,200 square kilometres (460 sq mi) reserve includes savanna, grassland, and woodland habitats. Acacia short-grass savanna predominates in the plains. Low ranges of rocky hills are covered in scrub. The Ibakany -Toomodo and Narus plains, Lonyili Mountains, Akorou-Bira Mountain, Dongatona Mountains and Didinga Hills have areas of montane forest and shrubland.

Mammal species in the reserve include African bush elephant, African wild dog, lion, cheetah, leopard, spotted hyena, lesser kudu, African buffalo, and giraffe. The present conservation status of these and many other mammals, birds, reptiles and amphibians is not known. It is likely that due to the protracted war and many other conservation challenges listed below the numbers of wildlife have been reduced in a similar way as those in Nimule and Southern national parks.

The reserve is an Important Bird Area. Native birds include Heuglin's spurfowl (Pternistis icterorhynchus), yellow-necked spurfowl (Pternistis leucoscepus), and dusky turtle dove (Streptopelia lugens).
