= Bahr el Zeraf =

Bahr el Zeraf Bahr ez Zeraf, Giraffe River, Phow

- Location in South Sudan
- Etymology: 1. from Arabic "Giraffe River" 2. Indigenous name for one of 21 (now defunct) initial states of South Sudan (2014–2020)
- Native name: بَـحْـر الـزّرَاف (Arabic)

Location
- Country: South Sudan
- State: Jonglei
- Region: Central Upper Nile

Physical characteristics
- Source: Sudd swamp
  - location: South Sudan
  - coordinates: 7.5°N 30.8°E
- Source confluence
  - location: Zeraf Cuts, South Sudan
  - coordinates: 7.768°N 30.567°E
- Mouth: White Nile
  - location: New Fangak, South Sudan
  - coordinates: 9.413°N 31.163°E

The Bahr el Zeraf (Arabic: بَـحْـر الـزّرَاف, romanized: Baḥr ez-Zerāf, lit. 'sea / waters of giraffe'), also known as the Giraffe or Phow River in the English language, is an arm of the White Nile in the Sudd region of South Sudan. It is completely contained within the South Sudanese state of Jonglei. Its name is Arabic for "Giraffe River".

== Course ==
The Bahr el Zeraf forms in the southern Sudd wetlands as an arm of the Bahr al Jabal ("Mountain Nile") section of the White Nile. A pair of man-made canals known as the Zeraf Cuts were dug in 1910 and 1913 to connect the two rivers at 7.768°N 30.567°E. These canals divert some of the Jabal's flow, more than doubling the Zeraf's volume, with the intention of accelerating the flow to Egypt and thereby reducing the water "lost" to evaporation and transpiration in the swamps.

From the Cuts the Zeraf flows north through the Ez Zeraf Game Reserve for 280 kilometres (170 mi). About 100 kilometres (62 mi) of this distance is through continuous swamp with islands, transitioning further downstream to a well-defined channel with raised banks. The Zeraf rejoins the White Nile near New Fangak, 80 kilometres (50 mi) downriver from Lake No and 56 kilometres (35 mi) upriver from Malakal.

== See also ==
- List of rivers of South Sudan
