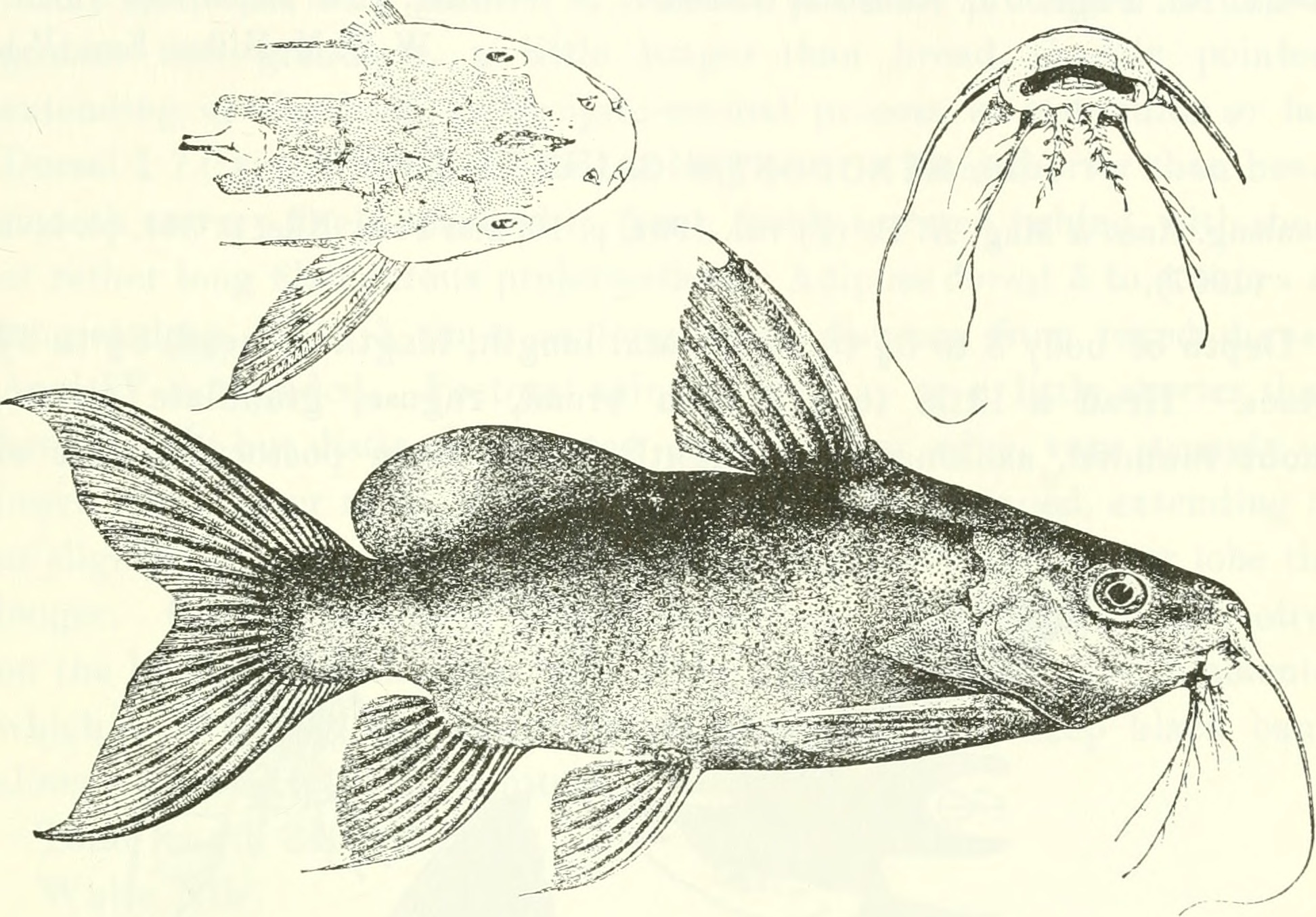

Conservation status
- Least Concern (IUCN 3.1)

Scientific classification
- Kingdom: Animalia
- Phylum: Chordata
- Class: Actinopterygii
- Order: Siluriformes
- Family: Mochokidae
- Genus: Synodontis
- Species: S. frontosus

Binomial name
- Synodontis frontosus Vaillant, 1895

= Synodontis frontosus =

Species of fish

Synodontis frontosus, known as the Sudan squeaker, is a species of upside-down catfish that is widely distributed throughout northern and central Africa. It has been reported in Chad, Democratic Republic of the Congo, Ethiopia, Kenya, Somalia, Sudan, and Uganda. It was first described by French zoologist Léon Vaillant in 1895, from specimens collected in the White Nile in Sudan. The species name frontosus is Latin, and means "broad head".

== Description ==
Like all members of the genus Synodontis, S. frontosus has a strong, bony head capsule that extends back as far as the first spine of the dorsal fin. The head contains a distinct narrow, bony, external protrusion called a humeral process. The shape and size of the humeral process helps to identify the species. In S. frontosus, the humeral process is a little longer than it is broad, and ends in a sharp point.

The fish has three pairs of barbels. The maxillary barbels are on located on the upper jaw, and two pairs of mandibular barbels are on the lower jaw. The maxillary barbel is long and straight without any branches, with a thin membrane at the base. It extends 1 1/5 to 1 3/4 the length of the head. The outer pair of mandibular barbels is about twice the length of the inner pair, and both pairs have long branches.

The front edges of the dorsal fins and the pectoral fins of Syntontis species are hardened into stiff spines. In S. frontosus, the spine of the dorsal fin is short, about 3/4 the length of the head, smooth in the front and serrated on the back. The remaining portion of the dorsal fin is made up of seven branching rays. The spine of the pectoral fin about as long as the dorsal fin spine, and serrated on both sides. The adipose fin is 2 1/2 to 4 times as long as it is deep. The anal fin contains four unbranched and eight to nine branched rays. The tail, or caudal fin, is deeply forked, with the upper lobe being longer.

All members of Syndontis have a structure called a premaxillary toothpad, which is located on the very front of the upper jaw of the mouth. This structure contains several rows of short, chisel-shaped teeth. In S. frontosus, the toothpad forms a short and broad band. On the lower jaw, or mandible, the teeth of Syndontis are attached to flexible, stalk-like structures and described as "s-shaped" or "hooked". The number of teeth on the mandible is used to differentiate between species; in S. frontosus, there are 33 to 48 teeth on the mandible.

The body color is grey-brown to blackish on the top, bottom, and sides, with white lips.

The maximum total length of the species is 34.2 centimetres (13.5 in). Generally, females in the genus Synodontis tend to be slightly larger than males of the same age.

== Habitat and behavior ==
In the wild, the species has been found in the basins of the Nile River and Shabeele River, and Turkana Lake, Albert Lake, Edward Lake, and Kyoga Lake. The reproductive habits of most of the species of Synodontis are not known, beyond some instances of obtaining egg counts from gravid females. Spawning likely occurs during the flooding season between July and October, and pairs swim in unison during spawning. The fish feeds on algae, macrophytes, detritus, crustaceans, insects and mollusks. The growth rate is rapid in the first year, then slows down as the fish age.
