= Lake Ambadi =

Lake in South Sudan

- Location within South Sudan
- Interactive map of Lake Ambadi
- Coordinates: 8°39′50″N 29°18′40″E

Lake Ambadi is a lake of South Sudan. It forms one of the world's largest wetlands, and is home to large numbers of the rare Shoebill.
