= Sudd =

Swamp in South Sudan

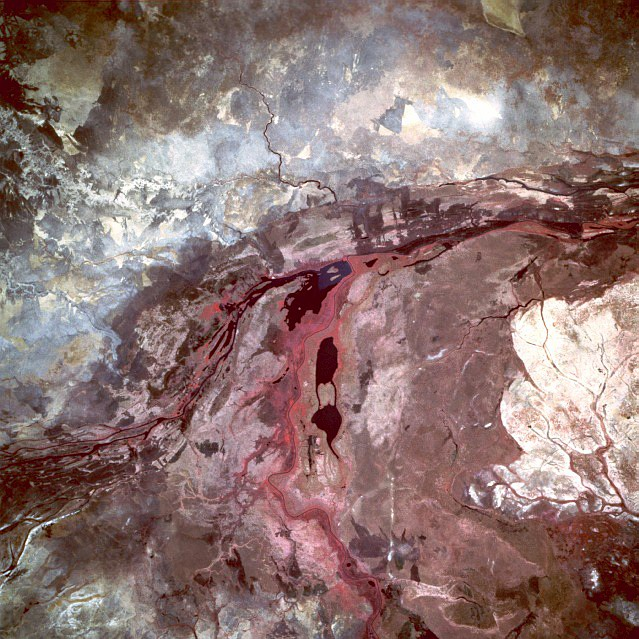
- Sudd Swamp from space, May 1993. This photograph was taken during the driest time of the year.

- Location of the Sudd in South Sudan

Ecology
- Realm: Afrotropical
- Biome: flooded grasslands and savannas
- Borders: East Sudanian savanna; Northern Congolian forest–savanna mosaic; Sahelian Acacia savanna

Geography
- Area: 57,000 km^{2} (22,000 mi^{2})
- Country: South Sudan
- Coordinates: 8°N 31°E

Ramsar Wetland
- Designated: 5 June 2006
- Reference no.: 1622

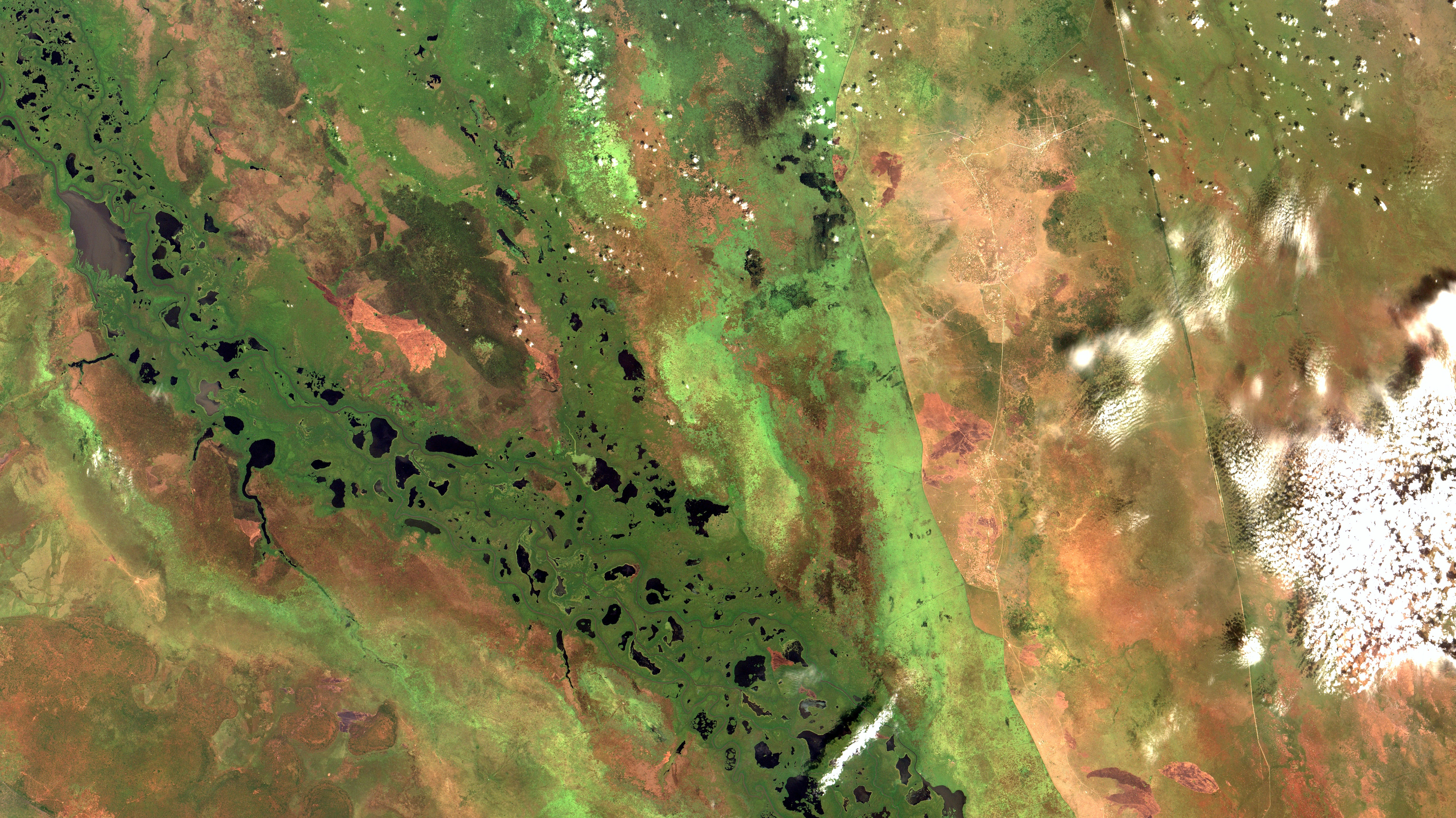
Satellite image of the swamp around the time of the wet season

The Sudd (Arabic: السد, romanized: as-Sudd, Nuer: Baki̱ec, Dinka: Toc) is a vast swamp in South Sudan, formed by the White Nile's Baḥr al-Jabal section. The Arabic word sudd is derived from sadd (سد), meaning "barrier" or "obstruction". The term "the sudd" has come to refer to any large solid floating vegetation island or mat. The area which the swamp covers is one of the world's largest wetlands and the largest freshwater wetland in the Nile Basin.

For millenia the swamp, and especially its thicket of vegetation, proved an impenetrable barrier to navigation along the Nile. The ancient Egyptians failed to penetrate the Sudd and reach the areas south of it. In AD 61, a party of Roman soldiers sent by the Emperor Nero proceeded up the White Nile but were not able to get beyond the Sudd, which marked the limit of Roman penetration into equatorial Africa. For the same reasons in later times, the search for the source of the Nile was particularly difficult; it eventually involved overland expeditions from the central African coast, so as to avoid having to travel through the Sudd.

In 2019, a study suggested that increased water flows into the Sudd may be partly causing up to a third of the whole West African rise in atmospheric methane levels over the previous decade.

== Location ==
The Sudd stretches from Mongalla to just outside the Sobat River confluence with the White Nile just upstream of Malakal as well as westwards along the Bahr el Ghazal. The shallow and flat inland delta lies between 5.5 and 9.5 degrees latitude north and covers an area of 500 kilometres (310 mi) south to north and 200 kilometres (120 mi) east to west between Mongalla in the south and Malakal in the north.

Its size is highly variable, averaging over 30,000 square kilometres (12,000 sq mi). During the wet season it may extend to over 130,000 square kilometres (50,000 sq mi) comprising 21% of the country, depending on the inflowing waters, with the discharge from Lake Victoria being the main control factor of flood levels and area inundation. Since the Sudd area consists of various meandering channels, lagoons, reed and papyrus fields and loses half of its inflowing water through evapotranspiration in the permanent and seasonal floodplains, the complex hydrology has many primary and secondary effects. A major feature of the area is the incomplete Jonglei Canal, which was planned to bypass waters from the Sudd to avoid evaporation losses and increase the amount of water discharged at the outlet of the Sudd.

From 1961 to 1963, a great increase in the flooded area occurred when the level of Lake Victoria rose, and the outflow increased. The total area of the Sudd is related to the amount of water reaching Bor from the Albert Nile and from torrents or seasonal watercourses that can add substantial amounts to the flow in the upstream end of the Sudd. During the 1960s increase in Lake Victoria discharge, where flows at Mongalla roughly doubled, the flows at Malakal at the northern end of the swamps increased by 1.5 times the previous average flow. As a consequence of these high flows, the areas of permanent swamp and seasonal floodplains have, taken together, increased to 2.5 times their former size. The swamps have increased the most, and the seasonal floodplain is 1.5 times its previous size.

From the southern inflow of the Bahr al Jabal ("Sea of the Mountain") at Mongalla, the defined riverbed successively widens into a floodplain, where the waters flow in meandering river stretches and various channels and lagoons throughout the dry season. With rising water levels it expands over the semi-flooded grasslands during the flood season.

Slightly downstream of Bor, the Bahr el Zeraf ("Sea of the Giraffes") river branches off the Bahr al Jabal to the east, diverting part of the flow, and again joins the Bahr al Jabal just before reaching Malakal. During the course of its flow, the Bahr al Jabal passes Lake No, where the Bahr el Ghazal ("Sea of the Gazelles") connects to the Bahr al Jabal, contributing an inflow with seasonal variation. At Malakal, the Sobat River joins into the system. The combined flows then stream to the north as the White Nile in a defined bed, joining with the Blue Nile waters at Khartoum to form the main Nile.

Sudd was designated as a Ramsar Wetland of International Importance in 2006. An area of 57,000 square kilometres (22,000 sq mi) was designated.

== Climate ==
Hydrologically the Sudd plays an important role in storing floodwaters and trapping sediments from the Bahr al Jabal. Roughly 55% of water entering the area is lost to evaporation. Water levels fluctuate by up to 1.5 metres, depending on the intensity of seasonal flooding. The region receives less rainfall (typically between 55 and 65 centimetres per year) than neighbouring areas at the same latitude. Orographic lifting on the eastern and western sides of the Sudd contribute to that condition.

== Geomorphology ==
The morphology of the area is defined by the channel and lagoon system of the permanent Sudd swamps, the adjacent flood plains, and the surrounding flat terrain. The Bahr al Jabal runs to the north-northwest and therefore in an angle to the gradient of the floodplain, which slopes down to the north, while north of Juba the river flows in an incised trough. The banks of this trough decrease in height from south to north with the Bahr al Jabal approaching Bor and ending in the Sudd flood plain just north of Bor on the eastern bank and towards Shambe on the western bank. In the southern part, the river meanders from side to side in the restraining trough in one or more channels, but further north the swamp is not limited by higher ground and the system of river channels becomes increasingly complex. The characteristics of the river with its network of channels and lagoons are distinguishable in satellite imagery and digital elevation models.

The geology of the area is defined by heavy clay soils, highly impermeable with a top layer of "black cotton" vertisol of approximately 500 mm on average. Sandy soils are found only at depths of approximately 30 metres (98 ft) and below, as determined by well drilling profiles. This indicates a very limited groundwater influence on the area's hydrology.

== Population ==
Nuer and Dinka pastoralists use the Sudd and the surrounding areas extensively. Livestock and rain-fed agriculture are the dominant means of support for the largely rural population for which the seasonal flooded grasslands along the Sudd provides valuable grazing lands.

== Vegetation and ecosystem ==
Vegetation cover of the area can generally be classified in five categories which depend on the elevation of the area above river flood level: the lakes and rivers, the floating plant life of the swamp, river-flooded grasslands (Toic), rain-flooded grasslands, and wooded grasslands on the fringes. Grassland and woodland areas have been cultivated by local populations.

The density of the grasslands along the Sudd changes with the season, with tall grass in the rainy season and short dry grass in the dry season, when frequent fires also occur. The fluvial area is mostly overgrown with vegetation, with some main and side channels as well as lagoons of open water. The vegetation distribution is described in further detail in Sutcliffe (1974) and Petersen (2007). The main species are:

- Phragmites communis (shallow flooded, buried roots)
- Echinochloa pyramidalis (shallow flooded, buried roots)
- Oryza barthii (shallow flooded, buried roots)
- Echinochloa stagnina (deep flooded, superficial/floating roots)
- Vossia cuspidata (deep flooded, superficial/floating roots)
- Cyperus papyrus (deep flooded, superficial/floating roots)
- Typha domingensis

The first three species are anchored so their distribution is limited to the depth of flooding. For the last species their root system needs to be permanently in water or saturated soil, which is a good indicator of flood patterns. P. communis, E. pyramidalis and O. barthii for example dominate only in areas where the depth of flooding does not exceed 130 cm over a period of ten years or 118 cm for one month in the year.

Floating vegetation of C. papyrus had caused blockages in the Sudd swamps on a number of occasions between 1879 and 1900, when the plants were torn out by increased flooding. C. papyrus needs saturated conditions and can tolerate flooding that is not more than 150 cm deep.

When the matted vegetation breaks free of its moorings, it forms floating islands of vegetation up to 30 km in length. Such islands, in varying stages of decomposition, eventually break up.

Historically, the fully floating Nile cabbage (Pistia stratiotes) was an important plant in the Sudd, but it has largely been replaced by the invasive water hyacinth (Eichhornia crassipes). The sluggish waters are host to a large population of mosquitoes and parasites that cause waterborne diseases.

=== Fauna ===
Including several diverse aquatic habitats like swamps, lakes, channels and floodplains, the Sudd is rich in fish. Some 70 species have been recorded, and this mostly involves fish that are found in much of the Nile system such as marbled lungfish, Senegal bichir, African arowana, Mormyrus caschive, Nile carp, Nile tilapia, mango tilapia, redbelly tilapia, Nile perch, Distichodus rostratus, elongate tigerfish, African tetras, African sharptooth catfish, Synodontis frontosus, S. schall and others. Among the few endemics of the Sudd system are Clarias engelseni, Enteromius yeiensis, Nothobranchius nubaensis, N. virgatus and two apparently undescribed species of Enteromius, and the fish fauna in significant sections still has not been properly studied.

Over 400 species of bird are found in the Sudd, including shoebills (a stronghold for the species with several thousand individuals), great white pelicans, and black crowned cranes. The Sudd provides food and water to large populations of migrating birds. As the surrounding landscape is a large swath of dry Sahel across Africa, the swamp is also a haven for migrating mammals, especially antelopes, such as the bohor reedbuck, sitatunga (the most aquatic antelope of the Sudd, mostly inhabiting permanent swampland), the endangered Nile lechwe (not in permanent swampland, but generally near the water's edge and often walking in shallow water), and the white-eared kob (further away from the permanent swampland). White-eared kob, tiang and Mongalla gazelle take part in one of the largest mammal migrations on Earth, numbering about 1.2 million individuals in total. The shallow water is frequented by Nile crocodiles and hippopotamuses. In more upland areas the Sudd was known as an historic habitat for the endangered painted hunting dog, which however may have been exterminated in the region.

== Threats and preservation ==
The long-running civil war in Southern Sudan seriously disrupted conservation efforts in the Sudd, especially as the widespread availability of weapons has encouraged wildlife poaching, including of elephants. There are three game reserves: Zeraf Island between the Zeraf River and the Nile, Shambe Reserve, and Mongalla Game Reserve.

== Jonglei diversion canal ==
The early explorers searching for the source of the Nile experienced considerable difficulties, sometimes taking months to get through the Sudd. In his 1972 book The White Nile, Alan Moorehead says of the Sudd, "there is no more formidable swamp in the world". The Sudd swamp is sustained by the water from the southwestern tributaries (the Bahr el Ghazal system) and consumes a proportion of the main river through evaporation and transpiration.

Sir William Garstin, Undersecretary of State of Public Works of Egypt, created the first detailed proposal for digging a canal east of the Sudd in 1907. By bypassing the swamps, evaporation of the Nile's water would vastly decrease, allowing an increase in the area of cultivatable land in Egypt by 8,100 km^{2} (2,000,000 acres). The Egyptian government in the 1930s proposed digging a canal east of the Sudd to divert water from the Bahr al Jabal above the Sudd to a point farther down the White Nile, bypassing the swamps and carrying the White Nile's water directly to the main channel of the river.

The Jonglei Canal scheme was studied by the government of Egypt in 1946, and plans were developed between 1954 and 1959. Construction work on the canal began in 1978, but the outbreak of political instability in Sudan has held up work for many years. By 1984 when the Sudan People's Liberation Army brought the works to a halt, 240 km of the canal of a total of 360 km had been excavated. The rusting remains of the giant German-built excavation machine—variously nicknamed either "Sarah" or "Lucy"—are visible on a Google Earth image at the south end of the canal, where it has been located since it was disabled by a missile. When peace was restored in 2000, speculation grew about a restart of the project. However, on 21 February 2008, the Sudanese government said the revival of the project was not a priority. Nevertheless, in 2008, Sudan and Egypt agreed to restart the project and finish the canal in 24 years. South Sudan gained independence in 2011.

It is estimated that the Jonglei canal project would produce 3.5–4.8 billion m^{3} of water per year (equal to a mean annual discharge of 110–152 m^{3}/s (3 883–5 368 ft^{3}/s), an increase of around 5–7% of Egypt's current water supply. The canal's benefits would be shared by Egypt and Sudan, with the expected damage falling on South Sudan. The complex environmental and social issues involved, including the collapse of fisheries, drying of grazing lands, a drop of groundwater levels, and a reduction of rainfall in the region, limits the practicality of the project. The draining of the Sudd is likely to have environmental effects comparable to the drying of Lake Chad or the draining of the Aral Sea.

== See also ==
- Okavango Delta
- Draining of the Mesopotamian Marshes
