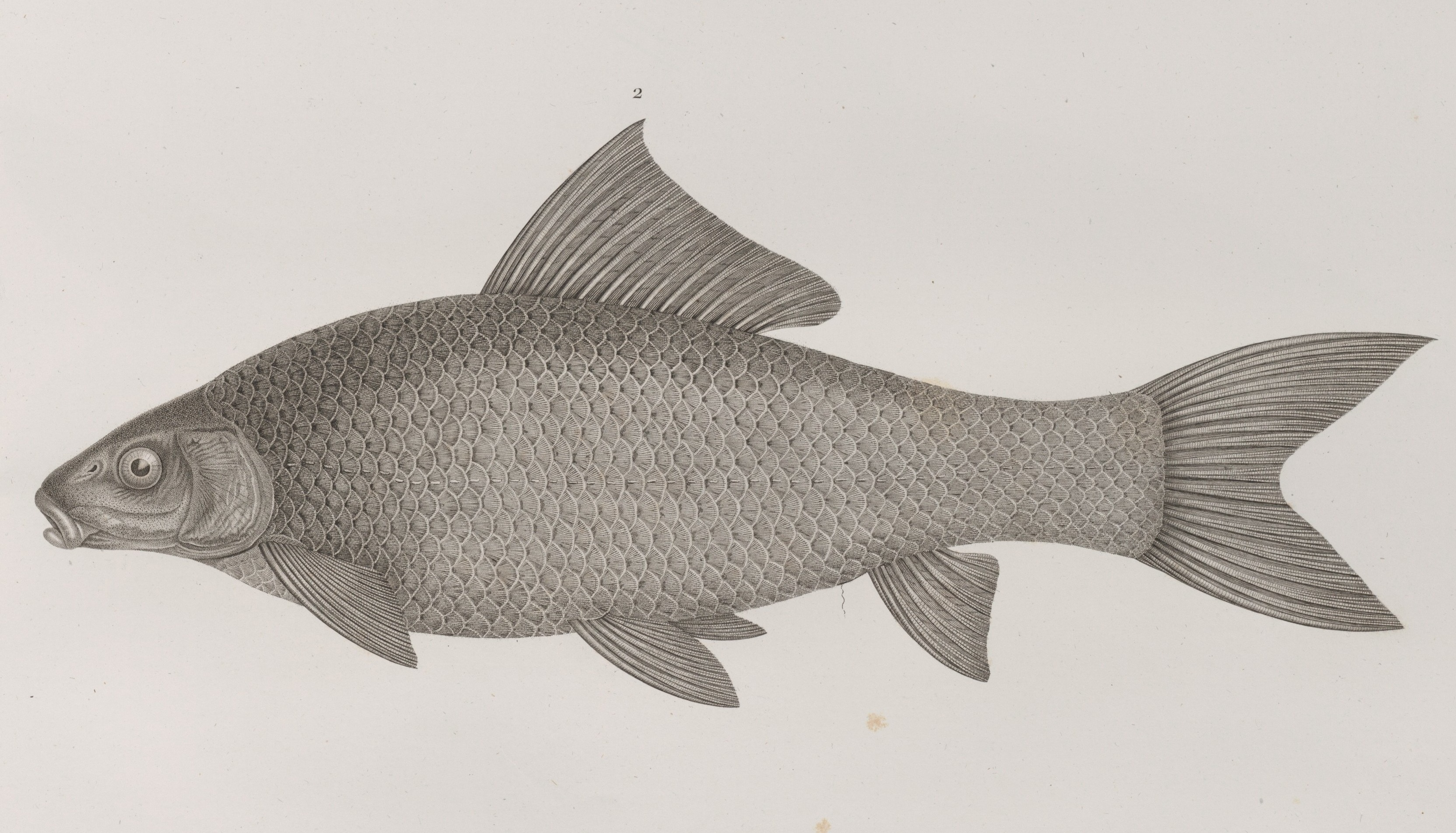
- drawing

Conservation status
- Least Concern (IUCN 3.1)

Scientific classification
- Kingdom: Animalia
- Phylum: Chordata
- Class: Actinopterygii
- Order: Cypriniformes
- Family: Cyprinidae
- Genus: Labeo
- Species: L. niloticus

Binomial name
- Labeo niloticus (Linnaeus, 1758)

Synonyms
- Cyprinus niloticus Linnaeus, 1758; Cyprinus niloticus Forsskål, 1775; Labeo vulgaris Heckel, 1847

= Nile carp =

Species of fish

The Nile carp (Labeo niloticus) is a fish species in the genus Labeo. It feeds primarily on plankton, and is distributed along the entire Nile valley. The Nile carp's diet is classified as mostly herbivorous, and besides plankton, it commonly consumes green algae, blue-green algae, and diatoms. The species also has a large population of their species located in the Khashm El-Girba reservoir and Atbara River, and their breeding season occurs between the months of July to September. It is generally believed to be the fish that swallowed the phallus of the Egyptian god Osiris in the myth regarding his death at the hands of his brother Seth.
