= Mongalla Game Reserve =

Game reserve in South Sudan

- IUCN category VI (protected area with sustainable use of natural resources)

The Mongalla Game Reserve is found in South Sudan. It was established in 1939. This site covers 75 km^{2}.
