= Bengangai Game Reserve =

Game reserve in South Sudan

Bangangai Game Reserve
- Bengangai Game Reserve
- IUCN category VI (protected area with sustainable use of natural resources)
- Location within South Sudan Location within Africa
- Interactive map of Bangangai Game Reserve
- Location: South Sudan
- Coordinates: 5°01′N 27°32′E
- Area: 170.0 square kilometres (17,000 ha)
- Established: 1939
- Governing body: South Sudan National Wildlife Service (SSWS)

The Bangangai Game Reserve (also spelled Bengangai Game Reserve) is found in South Sudan, on the border with the Democratic Republic of the Congo, west of the town of Yambio. Established in 1939, it is both a game reserve and an Important Bird Area. This site covers 170 square kilometres (17,000 ha).

Reserve is named after prominent 679 m height Bangani hill Chimpanzees are thought to inhabit the game reserve; however, there is no recent information on their population.

The vegetation of the area consists mainly of Guinea-Congolian forest.
