= Lantoto National Park =

National park in South Sudan

- IUCN category II (national park)
- Location within South Sudan
- Interactive map of Lantoto National Park
- Location: Central Equatoria, South Sudan
- Coordinates: 4°30′N 29°54′E
- Area: 760 km^{2} (290 sq mi)

Lantoto National Park is a protected area in Central Equatoria, South Sudan.

The park has an area of 760 km^{2} (290 sq mi) and is predominantly woodland, forest and open glades. The park was named by the Sudan's central government in the Wildlife Act of 1986 and Wildlife Conservation and National Parks Act of 2003. As of 2012 the boundaries of the park have not been demarcated.

The vegetation of the park supports a huge population of elephants, buffalo, baboon, antelope and ostrich.

The highest and the most prominent mountain is Jabal Mbangi.

Poaching in the park is increasingly threatening the survival of elephants.
