= Mbarizunga Game Reserve =

- IUCN category VI (protected area with sustainable use of natural resources)
- Location within South Sudan Location within Africa
- Interactive map of Mbarizunga Game Reserve
- Location: South Sudan
- Coordinates: 4°24′13″N 28°16′34″E
- Area: 10.0 square kilometres (1,000 ha)
- Established: 1939
- Governing body: South Sudan National Wildlife Service (SSWS)

The Mbarizunga Game Reserve is found in South Sudan. It was established in 1939. This site covers 10 square kilometres (3.9 sq mi).

== Flora and fauna ==
Chimpanzees were thought to occur at this site; however, there is no recent information on the occurrence of chimpanzees at this site (Department of Wildlife Management 1982). The tropical forest habitat features key species of Bongo, bushbuck, and Yellow-backed Duiker.
