= Chelkou Game Reserve =

Game reserve in South Sudan

- IUCN category VI (protected area with sustainable use of natural resources)
- Location within South Sudan Location within Africa
- Interactive map of Chelkou Game Reserve
- Location: South Sudan
- Nearest city: Aweil
- Coordinates: 9°36′N 26°00′E
- Area: 5,500.0 square kilometres (550,000 ha)
- Established: 1939
- Governing body: South Sudan National Wildlife Service (SSWS)

The Chelkou Game Reserve is a game reserve established in 1939 in South Sudan. The site has an area of 5,500 square kilometres (2,100 sq mi). The savannah woodland habitat features key species of elephant, giant eland, and buffalo.

The highest and the most prominent mountain is Jabal Kurkura.
