= Juba Game Reserve =

- IUCN category VI (protected area with sustainable use of natural resources)
- Location within South Sudan Location within Africa
- Interactive map of Juba Game Reserve
- Location: Juba South Sudan
- Coordinates: 4°50′12″N 31°33′00″E
- Area: 200.0 square kilometres (20,000 ha)
- Established: 1939
- Governing body: South Sudan National Wildlife Service (SSWS)

The Juba Game Reserve is a protected area in South Sudan, Africa. It is a game reserve and Important Bird Area. The 200 square kilometres (77 sq mi) savannah grassland and woodland habitat features key species of Heuglin's spurfowl and Arabian bustard.
