= Bire Kpatuos Game Reserve =

- IUCN category VI (protected area with sustainable use of natural resources)
- Location within South Sudan Location within Africa
- Interactive map of Bire Kpatuos Game Reserve
- Location: South Sudan
- Coordinates: 4°36′N 27°54′E
- Area: 5.0 square kilometres (500 ha)
- Established: 1939
- Governing body: South Sudan National Wildlife Service (SSWS)

The Bire Kpatuos Game Reserve is a protected area in South Sudan, Africa. The 5.0 square kilometres (1.9 sq mi) tropical forest habitat features key species of Bongo and Yellow-backed Duiker.

The reserve is close to the point of convergence for flora and fauna from Central and East Africa and has a " forgotten forest " as some conservators call it.

In addition to bongo antelopes, there is also habitat for badger bats, African golden cats, forest elephants and forest buffaloes.

South Sudan is making great efforts and has received significant support from donors around the world, to preserve the wilderness and environment in the reserve despite a long civil war.
