= Numatina Game Reserve =

- IUCN category VI (protected area with sustainable use of natural resources)
- Location within South Sudan Location within Africa
- Interactive map of Numatina Game Reserve
- Location: South Sudan
- Nearest city: Wau
- Coordinates: 7°30′N 27°30′E
- Area: 2,100 square kilometres (210,000 ha)
- Established: 1939
- Governing body: South Sudan National Wildlife Service (SSWS)

The Numatina Game Reserve is a protected area in South Sudan. The 2,100 square kilometres (810 sq mi) savannah woodland habitat is home to species including elephant, giant eland, and roan antelope.

There are three named mountains in Numatina Game Reserve. The highest and the most prominent mountain is Jabal Nbiripiri.
