= Ashana Game Reserve =

South Sudanese protected reserve

- IUCN category VI (protected area with sustainable use of natural resources)
- Location within South Sudan Location within Africa
- Interactive map of Ashana Game Reserve
- Location: South Sudan
- Coordinates: 8°50′N 26°49′E
- Area: 900 square kilometres (90,000 ha)
- Established: 1939
- Governing body: South Sudan National Wildlife Service (SSWS)

The Ashana Game Reserve is a protected area in South Sudan, Africa. It is both a game reserve and an Important Bird Area. The 900 square kilometres (350 sq mi) savannah woodland habitat features key species of elephant and giant eland.
