= Shambe National Park =

National park in South Sudan

- IUCN category II (national park)
- Location within South Sudan
- Interactive map of Shambe National Park
- Location: South Sudan
- Coordinates: 6°59′N 30°35′E
- Area: 620 km^{2} (240 sq mi)
- Established: 1985

The Shambe National Park is a national park in South Sudan, located on the west bank of the White Nile. It was established in 1985 and extends over an area of 620 km^{2} (240 sq mi).

The national game park is in the remote area of Adior payam and extend southward to Kenisa in Malek payam near Ramciel South Sudan. Another name for Shambe is "Anyoop”.

It was primarily established to provide protection to certain wild animals, such as foxes, monkeys, lions, gazelles, giraffes and ostriches.
