= Southern National Park =

National park in South Sudan

- IUCN category II (national park)
- Location within South Sudan
- Interactive map of Southern National Park
- Coordinates: 6°33′N 28°17′E
- Area: 23,000 km^{2} (8,900 sq mi)
- Established: 1939

The Southern National Park is a national park in South Sudan. It was established in 1939. This site has an area of 23,000 km^{2}.

== History ==
A.B. Anderson, a former Assistant Game Warden, reported that in 1950 that the Southern National Park was spread over an area of 7,800 square miles (20,000 km^{2}). It was drained by three rivers: the Sue River to the west, a well-defined channel that joined the Nile; the Gel River to the east; and the Ibba River in the centre of the park. The Gel and Ibba Rivers, after flowing through the park, formed a flood plain which made the habitat swampy.

== Flora & fauna ==
=== Flora ===
Bushveld, true rainforest vegetation, forests in laterite soils and gallery forests were found in the park. During the monsoon season, the park had extensive grassland that grew up to about 15 feet (4.6 m). The soil was generally of whitish clay and there were sandy valleys. The park was thinly populated and visited by very few tourists. Hunting, fishing and honey collection were the common vocations of the people living in the park area.

=== Fauna ===
He identified aquafauna in the rivers flowing through the park as aba, an eel-like fish, tilapia, Nile bichir, lung fish, catfish, and a few crocodiles. Mammals reported to have been present in the park during Anderson's time in Southern Sudan were giant eland, waterbuck, kob, hartebeest, korrigum, African buffalo, Kordofan giraffe, oribi, northern white rhino, reedbuck, lion, colobus monkey, various galagos including the Senegal bushbaby, and giant forest hog. Anderson also reported that marabou storks and pelicans were present in some regions of the park.
