= Nimule National Park =

National park in South Sudan

- IUCN category II (national park)
- Location within South Sudan
- Interactive map of Nimule National Park
- Coordinates: 3°42′N 31°57′E
- Area: 410 km^{2} (160 sq mi)
- Established: 1954

The Nimule National Park is a national park in South Sudan. It was established in 1954, and extends over an area of 410 km^{2}, along the border with Uganda.
