= Fanyikang Game Reserve =

- Fanikang Game Reserve
- IUCN category VI (protected area with sustainable use of natural resources)
- Location within South Sudan Location within Africa
- Interactive map of Fanyikang Game Reserve
- Location: South Sudan
- Coordinates: 9°25′00″N 31°25′48″E
- Area: 480 square kilometres (48,000 ha)
- Established: 1939
- Governing body: South Sudan National Wildlife Service (SSWS)

The Fanyikang Game Reserve is a protected area in South Sudan, Africa. It is within a Ramsar site. The 480 square kilometres (190 sq mi) flooded grassland and woodland habitat features key species of Nile Lechwe.
