= Wildlife of Chad =

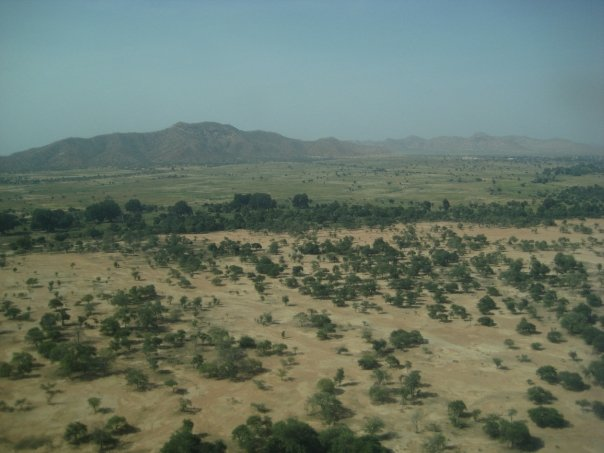
Vegetation outside Goz Beïda

The wildlife of Chad is composed of its flora and fauna. West African lions, African buffalo, hippopotamuses, Kordofan giraffes, antelopes, African leopards, cheetahs, hyenas, bush elephants, and many species of snakes are found there, although most large carnivore populations have been drastically reduced since the early 20th century. Elephant poaching, particularly in the south of the country in areas such as Zakouma National Park, is a severe problem.

== Vegetation ==
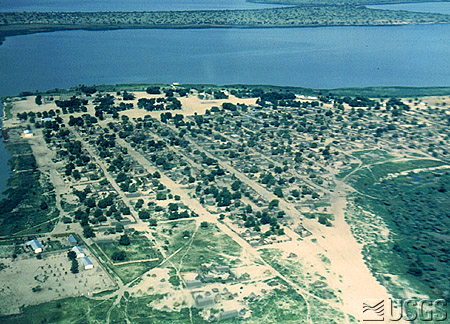
Aerial photo of Lake Chad

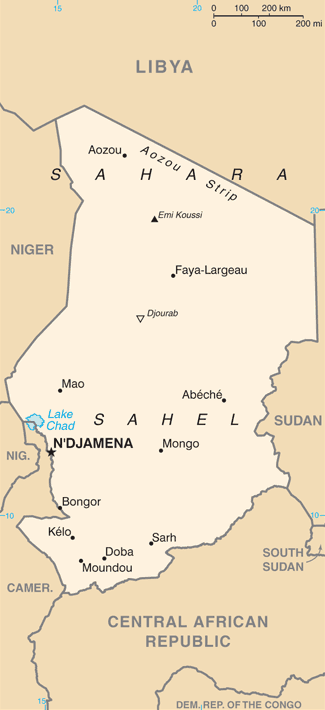
Map of Chad

As of 2011, there were 2,288 species of plants in the country, 55 of which are endemic. Precipitation varies widely from south to the north. The country is also subject to hot, dry, dusty conditions. Harmattan winds are a feature in the northern part of the country. Droughts and locust plagues are also common. The vegetation in the country is broadly categorized under the three regions of the northern Sahara zone, the central Sahel zone, and the southern Sudan zone; all three zones are of equal proportion.

In Chad forest cover is around 3% of the total land area, equivalent to 4,313,000 ha (10,660,000 acres) of forest in 2020, down from 6,730,000 ha (16,600,000 acres) in 1990. In 2020, naturally regenerating forest covered 4,293,000 ha (10,610,000 acres) and planted forest covered 19,800 ha (49,000 acres). For the year 2015, 100% of the forest area was reported to be under public ownership.

The northern part of the country which has the Sahara desert and which borders Libya and the volcanic massif of Tibesti (3,415 metres or 11,204 feet) forms part of the northern zone. Vegetation is dominantly tropical in the tropical zone of the country with deserts having least vegetative growth. However, a large area of desert dunes lie between Lake Chad and the Ouaddai massif, where fringes of xerophytic scrubland is noted.

The montane vegetation on the massif is rich, unlike the vegetation that is in the lowlands. Woody vegetation occurs in some deep gorges of the Ennedi massif, which rises to 1,450 metres (4,760 ft). A flat terrain supports Sahelian grasslands. The transition zone that lies between the southern Sahel and northern Sudan–Guinea is also a seasonal wetland. The Sudan Savanna zone mostly consists of Sudanian woodland with intermittent vegetation of edaphic grassland and Acacia.

The well-drained soils of the area once supported areas of dense woodlands with ebony and kapok trees (species of the Malvaceae family), but this has declined due to soil erosion and degradation. Vegetation found in the area includes acacias, baobab, desert date, palms, African myrrh, and Indian jujube. Found within the lake itself are aquatic plants such as reeds, papyrus, ambatch, and water lilies.

== Fauna ==
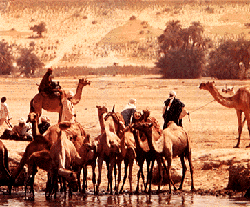
Camels in the Sahel region of Chad

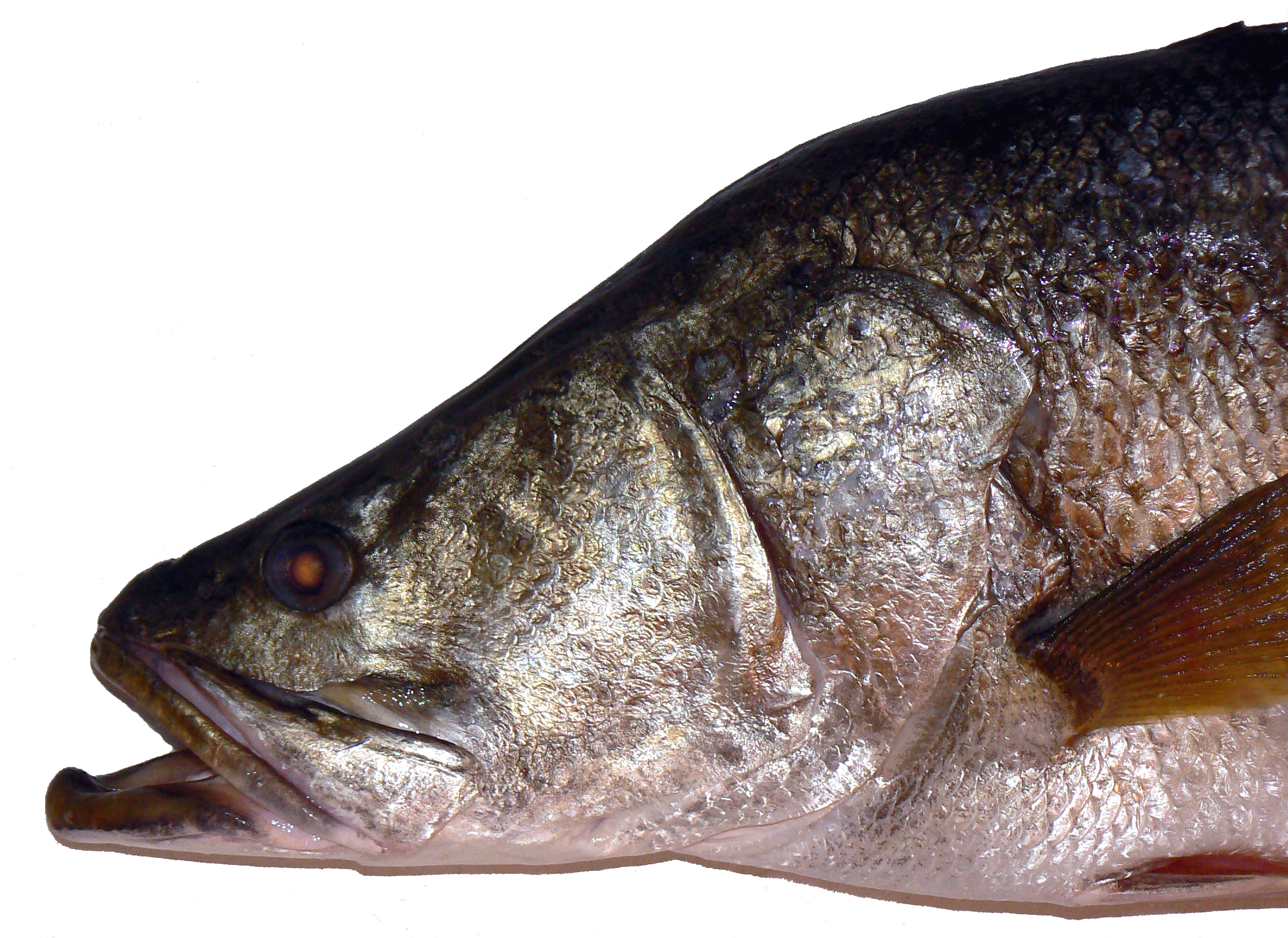
Nile perch

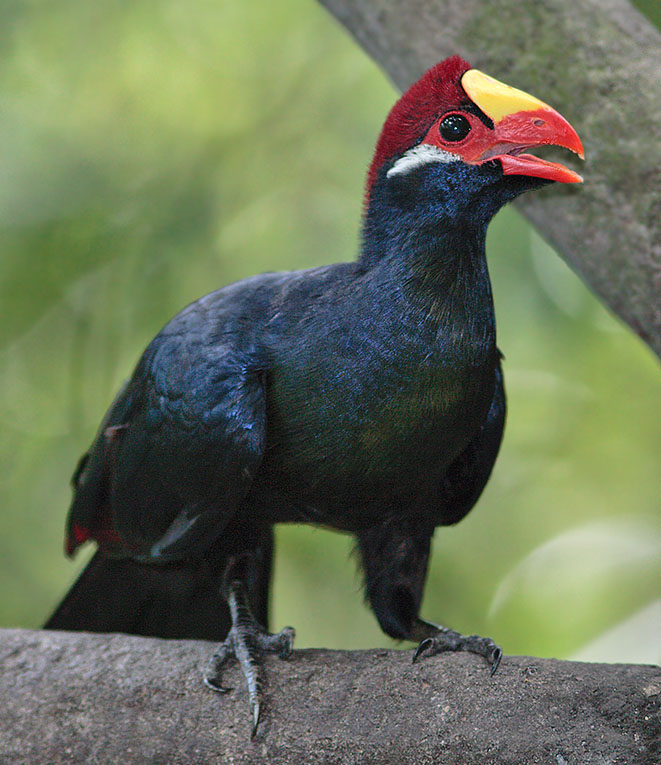
Violet turaco

As of 2002, there were at least 134 species of mammals and 532 species of birds (354 species of residents and 155 migrants) in Chad. Before the 20th century, Chad reportedly had a rich fauna of large carnivores in the Lake Chad region, but due to deforestation, hunting and competition from livestock most of the population of lions, leopards, rhinoceros, and hippopotamus have disappeared from the region.

The Zakouma National Park is an important habitat with the highest number of large mammals. Ouadi Rime Ouadi Achim Faunal Reserve is home to a growing population of around 600 scimitar horned oryx. This antelope species had become extinct in Chad in the late 1990s and was declared extinct in the wild in 2000, a reintroduction project was started by the Sahara Conservation and the Environment Agency of Abu-Dhabi in 2016 establishing the only truly wild herd.

Following the oryx reintroduction, addax (Addax nasomaculatus) were reintroduced starting in 2019, as this species was thought to have become extinct in the reserve and possibly extinct in Chad as a whole. Other species reported are: dama gazelle (Nanger dama), red-fronted gazelle (Gazella rufifrons), dorcas gazelle (Gazella dorcas), patas monkey (Erythrocebus patas), striped hyena (Hyaena hyaena), Sudan cheetah (Acinonyx jubatus soemmeringii), caracal (Felis caracal), Chadian wild dog (Lycaon pictus sharicus), African elephant (Loxodonta africana), spotted-necked otter (Lutra maculicollis), African clawless otter (Aonyx capensis), sitatunga (Tragelaphus spekei) and kob (Kobus kob). Rodent species reported are Mastomys verheyeni and gerbil (Taterillus lacustris). African rock pythons and spitting cobras are the reptile species reported.

=== Aquafauna ===
Lake Chad has 179 species of fish which feed on vegetation, phytoplankton and zooplankton. Some of the species reported are catfish (Clarias gariepensis), tilapia, cichlids, characin (Alestes baremoze) and Nile perch (Lates niloticus). Lungfish and sailfin are the two other unique species in the lake. Crocodile and hippopotamus also inhabit the lake as do birds, and it is an important destination for many migratory species of birds.

=== Avifauna ===
BirdLife International has reported 532 species of birds of which 354 residents and 155 are migrants, the Avibase - Bird Checklists of the World reports 587 species including 6 globally threatened species. Of these the species under critically endangered, endangered, near-threatened, and vulnerable categories are:

==== Critically endangered ====
- Slender-billed curlew (Numenius tenuirostris)

==== Endangered ====
- Egyptian vulture (Neophron percnopterus)
- Hooded vulture (Necrosyrtes monachus)
- White-backed vulture (Gyps africanus)
- Rueppell's griffon (Gyps rueppellii)
- Saker falcon (Falco cherrug)

==== Vulnerable ====
- Marbled teal (Marmaronetta angustirostris)
- Secretary-bird (Sagittarius serpentarius)
- White-headed vulture (Trigonoceps occipitalis)
- Beaudouin's snake-eagle (Circaetus beaudouini)
- Greater spotted eagle (Clanga clanga)
- Black crowned crane (Balearica pavonina)

==== Near-threatened ====
- Ferruginous duck (Aythya nyroca)
- Bateleur (Terathopius ecaudatus)
- Lesser flamingo (Phoenicopterus minor)
- Martial eagle (Polemaetus bellicosus)
- Pallid harrier (Circus macrourus}
- Arabian bustard (Ardeotis arabs)
- Stanley bustard {Neotis denhami)
- Nubian bustard (Neotis nuba)
- Eurasian curlew (Numenius arquata)
- Black-tailed godwit (Limosa limosa)
- Great snipe (Gallinago media)
- Black-winged pratincole (Glareola nordmanni)
- African skimmer (Rynchops flavirostris)
- European roller (Coracias garrulus)
- Red-footed falcon (Falco vespertinus)
- Sooty falcon (Falco concolor)

The violet turaco (Musophaga violacea) is a species of least concern, which is found in large numbers in a range of less than 20,000 km^{2} (7,700 sq mi) covering many African countries including Chad.

== Protection ==
The protected parks, reserves, protection forests, reforestation areas, and Ramsar Wetlands of international importance in the country include the IUCN Level II categorized Aouk (7,400 km^{2} or 2,900 sq mi), Goz Beïda, Manda (1,140 km^{2} or 440 sq mi), and Zakouma (3,000 km^{2} or 1,200 sq mi) national parks. The country has a number of faunal reserves which are loosely protected including:

- Abou Telfane 1,100 km^{2} or 420 sq mi
- Bahr Salamat 20,600 km^{2} or 8,000 sq mi
- Beinamar 763 km^{2} or 295 sq mi
- Binder-Léré 1,350 km^{2} or 520 sq mi
- Fada Archei 2,110 km^{2} or 810 sq mi
- Larmanaye 3,040 km^{2} or 1,170 sq mi
- Mandelia 138 km^{2} or 53 sq mi
- Ouadi Rimé-Ouadi Achim 80,000 km^{2} or 31,000 sq mi
- Siniala-Minia 4,260 km^{2} or 1,640 sq mi

Aside from the numerous protected forests, Tibesti Massif is also a protected area. The wetlands of international importance—under the Ramsar Convention–are the Ramsar Sites at Lake Fitri (Lac Fitri; 1,950 km^{2} or 750 sq mi), Binder-Léré Faunal Reserve (Réserve de faune de Binder-Léré; 1,350 km^{2} or 520 sq mi) and the Chadian section of Lake Chad (partie tchadienne du lac Tchad; 16,481.68 km^{2} or 6,363.61 sq mi).

In addition to parks and reserves, eight Important Bird Areas (IBAs) have been identified and supported by BirdLife International. These cover 11.2 percent of the country, an area of 146,500 square kilometres (56,600 sq mi), some overlapping with parks and reserves. Of these, the Ouadi Rimé–Ouadi Achim IBA is the largest, covering an area of more than 6 percent of the area of the country.

== Conservation ==
Efforts have been made by the Food and Agriculture Organization to improve relations between farmers, agro-pastoralists and pastoralists in the Zakouma National Park (ZNP), Siniaka-Minia, and Aouk reserve in southeastern Chad to promote sustainable development. As part of the national conservation effort, more than 1.2 million trees have been replanted to check the advancement of the desert, which helps the local economy by way of financial return from acacia trees, which produce gum arabic, and also from fruit trees.

== Poaching ==
Poaching is a serious problem in the country, particularly of elephants for the profitable ivory industry and a threat to lives of rangers even in the national parks such as Zakouma. Elephants have been massacred in herds in and around the parks by organized poaching. The problem is exacerbated by understaffing. A number of wardens have been murdered by poachers.
