= List of World Heritage Sites in South Sudan =

Location of World Heritage Sites in South Sudan

The United Nations Educational, Scientific and Cultural Organization (UNESCO) World Heritage Sites are places of importance to cultural or natural heritage as described in the UNESCO World Heritage Convention, established in 1972. Cultural heritage consists of monuments (such as architectural works, monumental sculptures, or inscriptions), groups of buildings, and sites (including archaeological sites). Natural features (consisting of physical and biological formations), geological and physiographical formations (including habitats of threatened species of animals and plants), and natural sites which are important from the point of view of science, conservation, or natural beauty, are defined as natural heritage. The Republic of South Sudan accepted the convention on 9 March 2016. There country's sole World Heritage Site – Boma–Badingilo Migratory Landscape – was inscribed in 2026 in recognition of its natural significance and immediately listed as endangered. There are further two sites on South Sudan's tentative list. It has not served any terms on the Heritage Committee.

== World Heritage Sites ==
UNESCO lists sites under ten criteria; each entry must meet at least one of the criteria. Criteria i through vi are cultural, and vii through x are natural.

† In danger

World Heritage Sites
Site	Image	Location	Year listed	UNESCO data	Description
Boma-Badingilo Migratory Landscape†		Central Equatoria, Eastern Equatoria, Greater Pibor Administrative Area	2026	1808; vii, ix, x (natural)	The Boma-Badingilo Migratory Landscape has an estimated area of 37500 km^{2} (14,500 square miles). It consists of a large expanse of savannah habitats with the Boma and Bandingilo national parks on either side.

== Tentative list ==
In addition to sites inscribed on the World Heritage List, member states can maintain a list of tentative sites that they may consider for nomination. Nominations for the World Heritage List are only accepted if the site was previously listed on the tentative list. In 2017, South Sudan formally listed its tentative sites to the UNESCO World Heritage Centre. It was the first time South Sudan listed its sites to the organization for future inclusion. Two sites are listed throughout the country.

Tentative sites
Site	Image	Location (State)	Year listed	UNESCO criteria	Description
Deim Zubeir – Slave route site	Various South Sudanese children playing in front of the Deim Zubeir church	Western Bahr el Ghazal,	2017	ii, iii, vi (cultural)	Deim Zubeir is a historical slave camp which was used in the slave trade in the 19th century. The name of the site comes the northern Sudanese businessman Zubeir Rahma Mansur who was involved in the slave trade. Locals at the time of its use referred to it as "Uyujuku"
Sudd wetland	Satellite image of the Sudd wetland	Southern Liech State, Eastern Lakes State, Upper Nile State, Akobo State	2017	v, vii, ix, x (mixed)	The Sudd wetland is an area of approximately area of approximately 57000 km^{2} (22,000 square miles) in the Nile Basin. It is one of the world's largest freshwater ecosystems.

== See also ==
- List of World Heritage Sites in Africa
- Tourism in Africa
