= Abokouamekro Game Reserve =

Protected area of the Ivory Coast

Coordinates: 7°5′N 5°5′W

Abokoamekro Faunal Reserve
- IUCN category IV (habitat/species management area)
- Interactive map of Abokoamekro Faunal Reserve
- Location: Côte d'Ivoire
- Area: 204.35 km^{2} (78.90 sq mi)
- Established: 1993

The Abokouamekro Game Reserve is a protected area located near Yamoussoukro in central Ivory Coast. It was established in 1986 and gazetted as a protected reserve in 1993. The reserve covers 204.35 km^{2} (78.90 sq mi), and is a protected savanna and grassland ecosystem. It is home to many West African megafauna, bird species, and other biodiversity. The reserve supports local livelihoods via eco‑tourism, and employment. However, poaching has been a continuous threat in the reserve.

== History ==
Abokouamekro was earmarked as a protected reserve in 1986 through a presidential decree, with the specific aim of creating a tourist and conservation site. The reserve was official gazetted as a game reserve in 1993. While the reserve supports local employment through eco‑tourism, ranger and conservation roles, a study indicated that about 85% of the local population believe it to be a hindrance to their lives.

== Geography ==
The reserve is located about 60 km (37 mi) from Yamoussoukro in central Ivory Coast. It consists of verdant grasslands (savanna), interspersed with rivers and tree stands. The reserve covers 204.35 km^{2} (78.90 sq mi).

== Flora and fauna ==
The reserve has received translocated wildlife from other parks as a part of reintroduction efforts. Reintroduced species include African elephant, white rhinoceros, giraffe, cape buffalo, hippopotamus, wildebeest, kob and African lion. It also hosts various monkeys, and other ungulates. The park also has various birds, reptiles, and insects. Poaching has been a major threat to the park's ecosystem.
