= Boma–Badingilo Migratory Landscape =

Land mammal migration

Boma–Badingilo Migratory Landscape or Great Nile Migration Landscape (GNML) is the largest land mammal migration in the world. It features seasonal movement of millions of antelope, such as white-eared kob (5,000,000), Mongalla gazelle (350,000), tiang (300,000), and Bohor reedbuck (160,000), in search of water.

Once thought to not exist anymore because of years of conflict in South Sudan, aerial views from helicopters and airplanes have made the migration visible in an area where virtually no roads exist. The vacant areas border tribes of indigenous people. The terrain is made up of savanna and woodland floodplain under threat from agricultural production as well as oil, gas and mining developers. The known range of the migration cover 122,774 square kilometres (47,403 sq mi), stretching from South Sudan's Bandingilo and Boma national parks into Ethiopia's Gambella National Park.

The migration occurs from January to June, with the pattern reversed from November to January. In numbers and spatial extent, the Great Nile Migration surpasses that of the Serengeti's wildebeest (2,000,000)) by more than double. In 2021, it was estimated the migration included 1 million kob and 200,000 tiang. A 2023 survey found it may be the largest migration, including 5 million white-eared kob, 350,000 Mongalla gazelle, 300,000 tiang, and 160,000 bohor reedbuck.

In 2022, the Republic of South Sudan and African Parks signed a 10-year agreement to manage the country's two national parks and the GNML. With headquarters at the University of Wyoming, international research is underway to document the migration of the 5,000,000 to 7,000,000 animals.
