= Gambella National Park =

National park in Gambela Region, Ethiopia

- IUCN category II (national park)
- Location within Ethiopia
- Location: Gambela Region, Ethiopia
- Coordinates: 7°52′N 34°0′E
- Area: 4,575 km^{2} (1,766 sq mi)
- Established: 1974–1975
- Administrator: Ethiopian Wildlife Conservation Authority

Gambella National Park, also spelled Gambela National Park, is a 5,016 km^{2} (1,937 sq mi) large national park in Ethiopia. It is the nation's largest national park and is located several hundred kilometers from Addis Ababa. It was established in 1974, but is not fully protected and has not been effectively managed for much of its history.

== History ==
Gambella was established during 1974–1975 to protect habitat and wildlife, especially the Nile lechwe and white-eared kob, two antelope species thought to have been endangered at the time. Animal populations in the park have declined because of agriculture, cotton farming, hunting, poaching, and the creation of refugee camps, especially following the 1983–1985 famine in Ethiopia and by the displaced Sudanese.

In 2012, Bantayehu Wasyihun, head of the park's office, said infrastructure development was underway to make Gambella more accommodating to tourists. The park management organization African Parks and Addis Ababa University's Horn of Africa Research Centre worked with park officials to draft plans to improve Gambella's security and structure.

== Fauna and flora ==
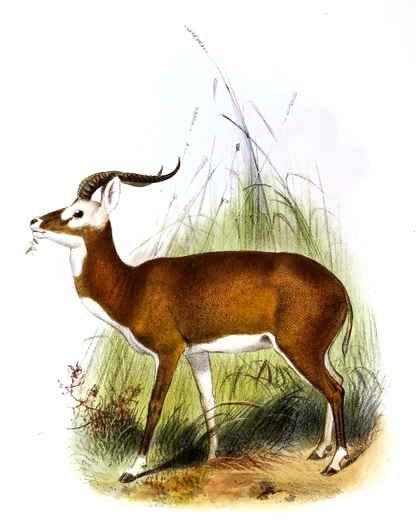
The white-eared kob (K. k. leucotis) serves as a flagship species of Gambella National Park.

Gambella National Park has one of the highest concentrations of wildlife in Ethiopia. Sixty-nine mammal species are found in the protected area, including the African elephant, African buffalo, bushpig, common warthog, Nubian giraffe, hippopotamus, Nile lechwe, tiang, waterbuck, cheetah, leopard, lion, mantled guereza, olive baboon, patas monkey and spotted hyena.

The park also hosts herds of Bohor reedbuck, bushbuck, Lelwel hartebeest, oribi, reedbuck, roan antelope, and white-eared kob. The world's largest annual animal migration, the Great Nile Migration Landscape, takes place when multiple species of antelope, including Bohor reedbuck, tiang, and white-eared kob, move between South Sudan's Bandingilo National Park and Boma National Park, into Gambella National Park. The white-eared kob migration is Africa's largest terrestrial mammal migration

In 2015, African Parks and the Ethiopian Wildlife Conservation Authority surveyed the park's giraffe population for the first time, and estimated there were between 100 and 120 giraffes. Gambella's giraffes are classified as of the Nubian subspecies. The IUCN designated the protected area as a 'lion conservation unit' in 2005.

Three hundred and twenty-seven bird species, including seasonal migrants, have been recorded, including the African skimmer, black-faced firefinch, Carmine bee-eater, cisticolas, crowned cranes, Egyptian plover, exclamatory paradise whydah, African green bee-eater, pelicans, approximately 40 species of raptors, red-necked buzzard, red-throated bee-eater, storks, warblers, and vultures.

Plant species along the Akobo and Baro rivers include the Acacia victoriae, Arundo donax and temba (Pennisetum petiolare). The invasive Eichhornia crassipes (water hyacinth) and shenkorageda (Saccharum officinarum) have also been reported.

== Conservation ==
Efforts to reduce poaching doubled the number of wild animals in the park between 2008 and 2012.

== See also ==
- List of protected areas of Ethiopia
