= Bandingilo National Park =

National park in South Sudan

- IUCN category II (national park)
- Location within South Sudan
- Interactive map of Bandingilo National Park
- Location: Equatoria, South Sudan
- Nearest city: Juba
- Coordinates: 5°25′58″N 32°16′39″E
- Area: 10,000 km^{2} (3,900 sq mi)
- Established: 1992

UNESCO World Heritage Site
- Official name: Boma–Badingilo Migratory Landscape
- Criteria: Natural: vii, ix, x
- Reference: 1808
- Inscription: 2026 (48th Session)
- Endangered: 2026–present
- Area: 11,236,800 ha

The Boma-Bandingilo National Park, sometimes spelled Badingilo, is a national park located in South Sudan's Equatoria region. The park covered the erstwhile states of Central Equatoria and Eastern Equatoria. It was established in 1992. Situated in a wooded area near the White Nile river, it is over 10,000 square kilometres (3,900 sq mi) in size. It also contains large marshlands stretching up into Jonglei state.

The world's largest annual animal migration, the Great Nile Migration Landscape, takes place when multiple species of antelope, including Bohor reedbuck, tiang, and white-eared kob, move between South Sudan's Bandingilo Park and Boma National Park, into Gambella National Park in Ethiopia.

The park is also home to the critically endangered species of the Nubian giraffe, Northeast African cheetah, and Northern lion. Additionally there are African wild dog, caracal, and spotted hyena. The park supports large bird populations, estimated to be 400 species in 2021. It has been named an Important Bird Area.

During the wet season, the grasslands are flooded. Then during dry season there is extensive burning. This helps maintain the grassland habitats.

== History ==
On 6 July 2011, three days before South Sudan formally seceded from Sudan, an administrative headquarters was officially opened at a ribbon-cutting ceremony led by Central Equatoria Governor Clement Wani Konga.

In August 2022, African Parks signed a 10-year renewable agreement with the government of South Sudan to manage Bandingilo and Boma National Parks. Prior to that the parks were managed by the Ministry of Environment and Forestry, and the Ministry of Wildlife Conservation and Tourism.

In July 2026, UNESCO designated the Boma–Badingilo Migratory Landscape as a World Heritage Site and listed it as endangered.

== Conservation ==
The 22-year long war between Sudan and South Sudan did not appear to affect the animal populations in the area the park now covers. But the development of the new country became a threat. Additional conflict lasted from around 2013 to 2020. As of 2021, conservationists are unable to monitor the effects to animal populations and habitats.

Though a major wildlife preserve, the park lies within a Total S.A. oil concession, potentially exposing it to surveying and drilling.

== See also ==
- List of national parks in Africa
