= Bahr Salamat =

River in Chad

Location
- Country: Chad

Physical characteristics
- Mouth
  - coordinates: 9°27′N 18°06′E

Ramsar Wetland
- Official name: Plaines d'inondation des Bahr Aouk et Salamat
- Designated: 1 May 2006
- Reference no.: 1621

The Bahr Salamat is a seasonally intermittent river in Chad. It flows southwards, and is a tributary of the Chari River.

When the Bahr Salama river is flowing, it runs through the community of Am Timan and also the Bahr Salamat Faunal Reserve of Chad. The Chari River is the main source of water of Lake Chad.

== See also ==
- Chari River topics
