= Dungonab Bay =

Marine national park of Sudan

- Dungunāb Bay
- خليج دونجوناب (Arabic); Ḫalīj Dūnjūnāb (Arabic)
- Location in Sudan
- Coordinates: 21°0′N 37°11′E
- Ocean/sea sources: Red Sea
- Basin countries: Sudan
- Max. length: 33 km (21 mi)
- Max. width: 12 km (7.5 mi)
- Islands: Numerous

UNESCO World Heritage Site
- Part of: "Dungonab Bay – Mukkawar Island Marine National Park" part of Sanganeb Marine National Park and Dungonab Bay – Mukkawar Island Marine National Park
- Criteria: Natural: (vii), (ix), (x)
- Reference: 262rev-002
- Inscription: 2016 (40th Session)

Ramsar Wetland
- Official name: Dongonab Bay-Marsa Waiai
- Designated: 2 February 2009
- Reference no.: 1859

Dungonab Bay or Dongonab Bay (Arabic: خليج دونجوناب Ḫalīj Dūnjūnāb) is a body of water on the coastline of Sudan on the Red Sea.

== Geography ==
The Dungonab Bay is south-facing and is located 130 km to the north of Port Sudan. Its mid part, the Rawayah Lagoon, is surrounded by coral reefs. Together with Mukkawar Island and Sanganeb (an isolated coral reef), the area was declared the Dungonab Bay – Mukkawar Island Marine National Park and became a World Heritage Site in 2016. It has been designated as a protected Ramsar site since 2009.

=== Important Bird Area ===
A coastal strip of the bay, including the mangroves of the bay shore, along with the Mukkawar, Mayetib and Taila islets and adjacent waters, have been designated an Important Bird Area (IBA) by BirdLife International because they support significant resident or breeding populations of spotted sandgrouse, white-eyed gulls, lesser crested terns, sooty falcons, greater hoopoe-larks, bar-tailed and desert larks, fulvous babblers and white-crowned wheatears.

== See also ==
- African Parks Network
- List of World Heritage Sites in Africa
- List of World Heritage Sites in the Arab States
