= Boma National Park =

National park in South Sudan

- IUCN category II (national park)
- Location within South Sudan
- Interactive map of Boma National Park
- Coordinates: 6°29′N 33°55′E
- Area: 22,800 km^{2} (8,800 sq mi)
- Established: 1977

UNESCO World Heritage Site
- Official name: Boma–Badingilo Migratory Landscape
- Criteria: Natural: vii, ix, x
- Reference: 1808
- Inscription: 2026 (48th Session)
- Endangered: 2026–present
- Area: 11,236,800 ha

Boma National Park is a protected area in eastern South Sudan near the Ethiopian border. It was established in 1977 and covers 22,800 km^{2} (8,800 sq mi) of grasslands and floodplains.

The park is in the Somali-Maasai and Sudano-Guinean biomes. The southern part of the park has extensive short grasslands and acacia bush. Woodland, mostly of Combretum and Ficus tree species, is in the eastern part. The western part is open grassland. Wetlands can be found, and though most are seasonal there are some permanent waterholes. The largest is the Juom Swamp in the north.

In August 2022, African Parks signed a 10-year renewable agreement with the government of South Sudan to restore Boma and Bandingilo National Parks and realise their potential as premier wildlife destinations. In July 2026, UNESCO designated the Boma–Badingilo Migratory Landscape, which consists of the two parks, as a World Heritage Site and listed it as endangered.

== Wildlife ==
The world's largest annual animal migration, the Great Nile Migration Landscape, takes place when multiple species of antelope, including Bohor reedbuck, tiang, and white-eared kob, move between South Sudan's Bandingilo National Park and Boma National Park, into Gambella National Park in Ethiopia.

The park is an important refuge for white-eared kob, tiang, and Mongalla gazelle. Other large mammals are buffalo, elephant, African leopard, Nubian giraffe, oryx, Lelwel hartebeest, Northeast African cheetah, common eland, maneless zebra, waterbuck, Grant's gazelle, lesser kudu, bongo, giant eland, and Nile lechwe. It is also an important bird area; avifauna includes Ruppell's vulture and the black-chested snake eagle. The neighboring Gambella National Park in Ethiopia protects similar species.

Since 2005, the protected area is considered a lion conservation unit together with Gambella National Park.

=== White-eared kob ===
The most prominent species of the Boma National Park is the white-eared kob (Kobus kob leucotis) antelope. A UNEP study reports that the white-eared kob is found mostly to the east of Nile River in South Sudan within the clay plains and wetlands; though occurring in substantial numbers in Boma National Park, it is reported to be found more outside the protected area. Its migration route and population during the summer and monsoon seasons have been recorded. Its migration route over the dry and wet seasons, which is dictated by the variation in rainfall and flooding from year to year, extends over 1,600 km (990 mi); it encompasses different ecoregions in various tribal belts, and exposes the species to hunting threats. In comparison to the wet season count of 680,716 in 1980 (849,365 in dry season), the UNEP survey of 2001 reported only 176,120 during the wet season (although the two studies are not directly comparable).

== Conservation ==
The wildlife in this park has provided bush meat, which is not only a dominant food need for many people of South Sudan, but also an avenue of illegal trading supported by wildlife hunting that has caused biodiversity damage. The park accounts for the greatest concentration of wildlife in the country, particularly of mammals.

African Geographic reported in 2021 that the decades-long conflicts in the region have caused conservationists to be unable to monitor the effects to animal populations and habitats . Additionally there is minimal infrastructure and limited access to the area. Once African Parks began management, they sent aerial surveys to begin estimating population numbers. Additionally 126 individuals from 12 different species were fitted with GPS tracking collars.
