= Fada Archei Faunal Reserve =

Protected area in Chad

- IUCN category IV (habitat/species management area)
- Location within Chad
- Location: Chad
- Nearest city: Fada, Ennedi, Chad
- Coordinates: 17.0°N 19.6666°E
- Area: 2,110 km^{2} (810 sq mi)
- Established: 1967

The Fada Archei Faunal Reserve is a protected area in north-eastern Chad, in its Ennedi administrative region.

== History ==
The reserve was established in 1967, covering an area of 2,110 km^{2} (810 sq mi), with terrain in the elevation range of 500–1,000 m (1,600–3,300 ft). Its primary aim was to protect Barbary sheep.

== Geography ==
The reserve is located to the south-east of Fada town. Its terrain, in the elevation range of 500–1,000 m (1,600–3,300 ft), forms part of the transition zone between the Sahelian and Saharan zones. It is marked by a rocky ridge divided by deep gorges. Barren sand dunes are interlaced with a few wadis. Mean annual rainfall is very scanty, with about 50 mm (2 in) falling in July and August. The escarpment opens into a north-facing gorge, 1.5 km (0.93 mi) in length, where there are six large ponds sourced by springs.

=== Environment ===
The gorges in the reserve are characterised by riparian forest of Vachellia nilotica, Vachellia seyal, Breonadia salicina, Balanites aegyptiaca, Boscia angustifolia, Ficus spp., and Vitex doniana. The ponds in the reserve are vegetated with Cyperus, Juncus, Phragmites, Scirpus, Typha, Nymphaea and Potamogeton spp. It is considered a depauperate ecosystem, with vegetation of mostly Vachellia and Balanites on the banks of the wadis.

=== Fauna ===
The reserve has been designated an Important Bird Area (IBA) by BirdLife International because it supports significant populations of African collared-doves, crowned and Lichtenstein's sandgrouse, Egyptian nightjars, Pharaoh eagle-owls, Sennar penduline-tits, greater hoopoe-larks, bar-tailed and desert larks, cricket warblers, fulvous babblers chestnut-bellied starlings, black scrub-robins, blackstarts, white-crowned wheatears and Sudan golden sparrows.

Mammals include lions, Northeast African cheetahs, addaxes, Barbary sheep and Dorcas gazelles.

Species of fish present include blackstripe barb and redbelly tilapia.

== Conservation ==
As the reserve is in the extreme north-eastern region of the country it is mostly undisturbed. Apart from grazing of cattle by local nomads, poaching is also prevalent to some degree. Due to civil strife in Chad since 1972 there has been a lack of personnel and equipment to provide security for conservation and prevent poaching.
