= 2006 Zakouma elephant slaughter =

Poaching massacres of African elephants

The 2006 Zakouma elephant slaughter refers to a series of poaching massacres of African elephants in the vicinity of Zakouma National Park in southeastern Chad. These killings were documented in aerial surveys conducted from May through August 2006 and total at least 100 animals.

This region has a four-decade long history of illegal killing of elephants. Chad's elephant population was reduced to around 20,000 in the mid-1980s and was roughly 3,000 as of 2010, according to Stephanie Vergniault, head of SOS Elephants in Chad. The elephant nominally has Chadian governmental protection, but the implementation practices of the government (backed with assistance from the European Union) was largely insufficient to stem the slaughter by poachers. The African bush elephant (Loxodonta africana) species occurs in several countries of Eastern and Central Africa. The most recent aerial surveys in Chad were conducted from August 3–11, 2006, overseen by J. Michael Fay, a Wildlife Conservation Society conservationist and National Geographic explorer-in-residence. They found five separate massacre sites.

== Reporting details ==
Fay reported that he saw five men at a base camp, who ran when his airplane approached. On another occasion, he saw one man on horseback with an automatic weapon, who fired on his airplane. "Zakouma elephants are getting massacred right before our eyes ... We hadn't been in the air more than two hours when we saw our first carcass. It was fresh, maybe just a few weeks old, not far from the park headquarters, and the animal's face had been chopped off, the tusks removed", Fay related to reporters. Fay and National Geographic photographer Michael Nichols documented what they found in Ivory Wars, Last Stand in Zakouma.

== History of Zakouma National Park ==
Zakouma National Park is located between Sarh and Am Timan, in the southeastern part of Chad. Created in 1963, it was Chad's first national park, and has an area of almost 3000 square kilometres. It is entirely surrounded by the Bahr Salamat Faunal Reserve. Zakouma was neglected during the period of civil conflict, but a restoration programme, supported by the European Union, began in 1989 and is continuing in 2006.

Elephants within the park have protection from the Chadian government, but the elephants who migrate outside Zakouma to forage in the rainy season, are not subject to the same patrol protection as within the park. According to Stephen Sautner of the Wildlife Conservation Society: "All hunting of elephants in Chad is illegal, and the sale of ivory has been banned since 1989, though black-market trade is increasing."

== Logistics of ivory trade ==
Killing elephants for ivory has been a major cause of the decline of the African elephant population since at least the 1970s. Most of the ivory harvested is imported into China and Thailand. For example, between 1996 and 2002 forty-five tonnes of ivory in transit to China were seized by authorities. China agreed to reduce imports of ivory; however Chinese official Chen Jianwei has indicated that many Chinese people are confused about the legality of ivory imports.

== Relation to regional conflict ==
Zakouma is about 260 kilometres west of the conflict area of Darfur, and is in the path of recent warfare in Chad, thus overall security is low and the national border is "porous in this isolated region."

== Conservation action ==
WILD Foundation partnered with The Wildlife Conservation Society and others to deter and detain poachers using aircraft surveillance. The aircraft will focus on park borders, where elephants are not protected.

== See also ==
- Elephant hunting in Chad
- Biodiversity Action Plan
- Extinction
- Ivory
