= Landau Zoo =

Zoo Landau in der Pfalz
- Interactive map of Zoo Landau in der Pfalz
- 49.2031201°N 8.1103295°E
- Date opened: 1904
- Location: Landau in der Pfalz, Germany
- Land area: 4 ha (9.9 acres)
- No. of animals: 600
- No. of species: 110
- Annual visitors: 170,000
- Memberships: EAZA, WAZA
- Website: www.zoo-landau.de

Zoo Landau in der Pfalz is a 4-hectare (9.9-acre) zoo in Landau in der Pfalz, Germany. It was founded in 1904. The governing body is the municipality of the city of Landau in der Pfalz (Landau/Palatinate/Germany). The zoo is situated in the city center, along the historic remains of a French fort. The average yearly number of paying visitors is between 155,000 and 170,000. The zoo is home to about 600 animals representing 110 species of mammals, birds, reptiles, amphibians, fish, and invertebrates. The current total number of employees is 20.

Zoo Landau is a member of the European Association of Zoos and Aquaria (EAZA) and the World Association of Zoos and Aquariums (WAZA).

The zoo's mission is the implementation of the objectives of the World Association of Zoos and Aquariums conservation strategy with a strong dedication to education, in-situ conservation and research. Among the rare and endangered species which are kept in the zoo are Philippine spotted deer, white-naped mangabeys, Northeast African cheetah and Madagascar side-necked turtles.

== Conservation ==
The international studbook for the Philippine spotted deer (Cervus alfredi) is coordinated by Zoo Landau.

The zoo supports international conservation projects in Ghana, the Philippines, Djibouti, Madagascars and Chile, and also cooperates with local and regional conservation organizations to promote the conservation of native biodiversity.

== Zoo School ==
A priority at Landau Zoo is the educational work of the Arten- und Tierschutzschule Landau (School for the protection of species and animals, Landau), called Zoo School, headed by Dr Gudrun Hollstein. The school, which was founded in 1992, is run in collaboration with the institut for pedagogic and adolescent education of the University of Koblenz-Landau, department Landau. More than 15,000 children attend the school each year.

Zoo School stresses learning through playing, acting and experiencing topics like the protection of the environment, species and animals. It is the first school in Germany to employ up to 40 students of different teacher professions and Master students of educational science, to run the classes independently and according to an up-to-date way of teaching. The students are trained carefully in special seminars for their educational work at Zoo School, where they find a large field of practical work in their future profession. They may therefore enrich their professional, personal and social competences. Since a new building was opened in September 2005, new topics and methods are included in the every day teaching about the protection of the environment.

Zoo School Landau was awarded for its innovative concept 2005 by the City of Landau. The School is one of the winners of the national competition "365 Orte im Land der Ideen" (365 places in the land of ideas). It was also awarded by UNESCO as official UN decade project 2007/8 for education for sustainability.
