= African Parks =

International NGO from South Africa

- Formation: 2000; 26 years ago
- Founders: Michael Eustace; Peter Fearnhead; Paul Fentener van Vlissingen; Anthony Hall-Martin; Mavuso Msimang
- Headquarters: Johannesburg, South Africa
- Key people: Peter Fearnhead (CEO); Vasant Narasimhan (Chairman)
- Website: www.africanparks.org

African Parks is a non-governmental organization (NGO) focused on biodiversity conservation through protected area management, established in 2000 and headquartered in Johannesburg, South Africa. It was founded as the African Parks Management and Finance Company, a private company, then underwent structural changes to become an NGO called African Parks Foundation, and later renamed African Parks Network. The organization manages national parks and protected areas throughout Africa, in collaboration with governments and surrounding communities. African Parks manages 24 protected areas in 13 countries as of October 2025, and employs more than 5000 staff.

== Overview ==
The Johannesburg-based nonprofit conservation organization African Parks manages national parks and protected areas throughout Africa, in collaboration with governments and surrounding communities. In addition to park management, the organization: actively manages and protects wildlife biodiversity, contributes to community development, works to reduce poaching and increase law enforcement and tourism, fundraises, improves infrastructure, and supports local residents. African Parks' motto is "a business approach to conservation".

African Parks as of 2017 managed 22 protected areas in 12 countries, including W National Park and Pendjari National Park in Benin, Chinko in Central African Republic, Ennedi Natural and Cultural Reserve, Siniaka-Minia Faunal Reserve, and Zakouma National Park in Chad, Boma National Park and Bandingilo National Park in South Sudan, Garamba National Park in the Democratic Republic of the Congo, Liwonde National Park, Majete Wildlife Reserve, Mangochi Forest Reserve and Nkhotakota Wildlife Reserve in Malawi, Bazaruto Archipelago National Park in Mozambique, Odzala-Kokoua National Park in the Republic of the Congo, Akagera National Park and Nyungwe Forest in Rwanda, Matusadona National Park in Zimbabwe, Iona National Park in Angola, and Bangweulu Wetlands, Liuwa Plain National Park and Kafue National Park in Zambia.

African Parks employs more than 1,100 rangers, as of 2020. According to The Washington Post, the organization "has the largest counter-poaching force of any private organization on the continent". Peter Fearnhead co-founded and continues to serve as African Parks' chief executive officer (CEO). Michael Eustace, Paul Fentener van Vlissingen, Anthony Hall-Martin, and Mavuso Msimang are also credited as co-founders. Msimang, who once served on the Military High Command of Umkonto we Sizwe and is former CEO of South African National Parks, is as of June 2021 Emeritus Board Member of the organisation. Vasant Narasimhan, M.D was appointed as African Parks’ Chairman of the Board in December 2022. Other board members include Hansjörg Wyss who founded the Wyss Campaign for Nature and H.E. Hailemariam Dessalegn who served as Prime Minister of Ethiopia (2012–18) and Chair, African Union (2013–14).

African Parks has received funding from the European Union, Adessium Foundation, Global Environment Facility, Howard G. Buffett Foundation, International Bank for Reconstruction and Development, National Geographic Society, Nationale Postcode Loterij, Swedish Postcode Lottery, United States Agency for International Development (USAID), United States Fish and Wildlife Service (USFWS), Walton Family Foundation, World Wide Fund for Nature, and Wyss Foundation, among others. A financial endowment funded by Fentener van Vlissingen directs approximately US$700,000 towards African Parks' annual operations. The organization's budget was approximately US$35 million in 2016.

== History ==
African Parks was established in 2000 as the African Parks Management and Finance Company, a privately held company. Msimang and Hall-Martin, who previously served as director and CEO of South African National Parks, respectively, held director roles at the newly formed company, as did Fentener van Vlissingen. Fearnhead, then head of commercial development for South African National Parks, initially served on the African Parks' advisory board. Planning for the company began after van Vlissingen met with Nelson Mandela in 1998, and early supporters included the U.S. Department of State and World Bank.

The first protected areas to be managed by the company were Majete Wildlife Reserve and Liuwa Plain National Park, starting in 2003. African Parks had planned to manage Zambia's Sioma Ngwezi National Park, but efforts stalled. The holding company was moved from Johannesburg to the Netherlands, and went through some structural changes. Eustace, Fearnhead, Hall-Martin, and Msimang became minority shareholders in African Parks B.V., and continued to serve on the company's board. The African Parks Foundation was created in the Netherlands and became the company's only shareholder. African Parks B.V. was liquidated in 2004.

During this transition, African Parks entered into agreements to manage Ethiopia's Nechisar National Park and Omo National Park in 2004 and 2005, respectively. However, the organization announced plans to terminate these two agreements in December 2007, and stopped managing parks in Ethiopia in 2008. African Parks had also entered into agreements to manage Garamba, as well as two Sudanese marine parks in Dungonab Bay and Sanganeb Atoll. These agreements did not give the organization full long-term control, like most of their other contracts. More internal changes were made to African Parks after Fentener van Vlissingen died in 2006. The organization's headquarters returned in Africa, and African representation returned to the board.

The organization began managing Akagera with the Rwanda Development Board in 2009, Zakouma in 2010, and Chinko in 2014. African Parks entered into a memorandum of understanding with Chad's government in February 2015 to establish Ennedi as a protected area, which became a Natural and Cultural Reserve. Malawi's government entered into agreements for African Parks to start managing Liwonde and Nkhotakota in August 2015. The Wyss Foundation funded African Parks' lion reintroduction project in Akagera in 2015. During 2016–2017, African Parks worked to relocate 500 elephants and other animals from Liwonde and Majete to Nkhotakota. Prince Harry assisted with the translocation, which was done in partnership with the Malawian Department of National Parks and Wildlife, and funded largely by the Nationale Postcode Loterij. Harry served as the organisation's president between 2017 and 2023 and was a member of its board of directors between 2023 and 2026.

In March 2017, African Parks received $65 million from the Wyss Foundation to fund conservation efforts in Malawi's Liwonde National Park and Majete and Nkhotakota Wildlife Reserves, as well as Rwanda's Akagera National Park, and supported the addition of up to five other protected areas to African Parks' management portfolio. African Parks entered into a ten-year agreement in mid-2017 to help manage Benin's Pendjari National Park, then agreed to manage Mozambique's Bazaruto Archipelago National Park in December. In 2018, the organization signed an agreement to manage Ennedi Natural and Cultural Reserve. In 2022, the Republic of South Sudan and African Parks signed a 10-year agreement to manage Bandingilo National Park and Boma National Park and the Great Nile Migration Landscape. In 2024, African Parks celebrated 20 years of operation in Majete Wildlife Reserve.

== Human rights abuses ==
In 2022, African Parks Rangers were accused of committing human rights abuses and atrocities for decades against indigenous people living in the parks. The allegations include rape, torture, and forced evictions of the Baka Indigenous people in the Odzala-Kokoua National Park in the Republic of Congo. As the allegations were reported upon again in 2024 and after an unnamed board member was alerted to them by Survival International, African Parks announced that they had launched an investigation through an external law firm. They also accused Survival International of failing to cooperate with their investigations, which prompted the head of Survival International's conservation campaign to state that African Parks "had the money to conduct their own investigation" and it was "their responsibility when we raise a problem to go there and investigate". Survival International has continued to report the human rights abuses and has escalated the matter through a submission to the UN Special Rapporteur, under the Covid recovery programme, including allegations against other organisations such as the World Wide Fund for Nature. African Parks released a statement detailing specific actions taken including commissioning an investigation by a London-based legal firm (Omnia Strategy LLP) in partnership with two specialist human rights legal counsel from Doughty Street Chambers to investigate all the allegations.

African Parks has been accused of neocolonialism by the World Rainforest Movement. The Financial Times reported that the organisation through American and European donors has "quietly accrued management control of 22 parks in 12 African countries, with a total area of 20mn hectares". In November 2024, new allegations emerged involving a group of women who had been promised a meeting with a high-level African Parks manager to discuss the destruction of crops by elephants. Following the manager's failure to attend the meeting and subsequent to the women's complaints, the eco guards allegedly "forced them to leave by whipping them and beating them, which led to a woman being actually trampled on and losing her baby."

In May 2025 in a statement the organisation admitted that human rights abuses were committed by its rangers in the Odzala-Kokoua National Park, though it did not release the results of the independent review that had been commissioned in the year prior nor did it discuss the details of abuse that had taken place.

In October 2025, the Chadian government abruptly ended its 15-year partnership with African Parks, accusing it of arrogance, poor cooperation, and failure to curb poaching in two key wildlife reserves, amid broader criticism of the organisation's handling of abuse allegations and transparency issues in other African countries. That same month, the Chadian government renewed its contract with the organization. In a joint statement, they stated that management agreements were reinstated "in a spirit of dialogue and cooperation", and would pursue new future projects.

In May 2026, Survival International released a statement claiming "the problems on the ground have not been solved" and criticised Prince Harry for his continued involvement with the organisation. At the same time, a leader of the Baka community was reported to have told Survival International: "We don't work with them. The way the African Parks treat us here is violent." African Parks stated that they had started to implant measures including a complaints and redress system, reporting channels operated by three independent human rights NGOs for nearby communities, and independent oversight by a panel of African judges and human rights specialists responsible for monitoring the grievance process and reviewing serious cases.
