= Beinamar Faunal Reserve =

Protected area in Chad

- IUCN category IV (habitat/species management area)
- Location within Chad
- Location: Chad
- Nearest city: Chad
- Coordinates: 8.6666°N 15.25°E
- Area: 1,380 km^{2} (530 sq mi)
- Established: 1969

The Beinamar Faunal Reserve covers an area of 7650 km^{2}. It was proposed to be set up by the local people in view of its rare wildlife species.
