= Bahr Salamat Faunal Reserve =

Conservation area in Chad

Map of Chad with Bahr Salamat emphasized
Coordinates: 10°37′39″N 19°24′55″E

Bahr Salamat Faunal Reserve (Réserve de faune du Bahr Salamat) is a conservation area in Chad. It is named after the Bahr Salamat River which flows through it. The reserve was designated on 1 January 1964 and is classed as IUCN category IV (Habitat/Species Management Area).

It has an area of 20,600 square kilometres and includes parts of the prefectures of Salamat, Guéra and Moyen-Chari, and surrounds the Zakouma National Park. Approximately half of its area is Lac Iro Controlled Hunting Area.

The area plays a very important role for the surrounding wildlife, providing refuge for several species of migratory birds, supporting cheetahs, hippos, elephants and several species of antelope. It prevents floods, regulates groundwater replenishment, sediment capture and chemical water regulation, and offers the hatching habitat for several fish species.

== See also ==
- 2006 Zakouma elephant slaughter
