= Zakouma National Park =

National park in Chad

- Parc National Zakouma
- IUCN category II (national park)
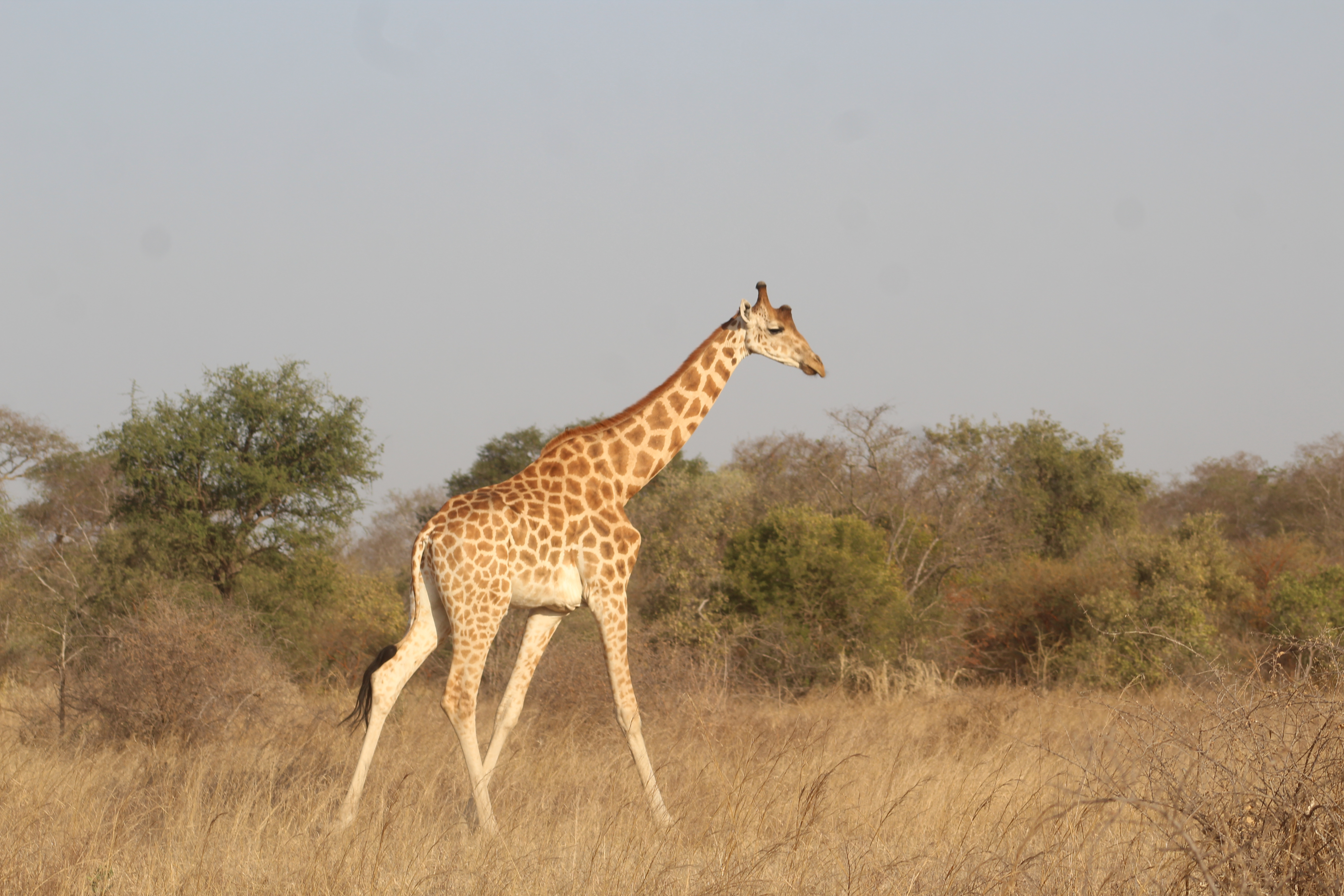
- Giraffe at the national park

- Location within Chad
- Location: Chad
- Coordinates: 10°50′52″N 19°38′52″E
- Area: 3,000 km^{2} (1,200 sq mi)
- Established: 1963

Zakouma National Park (Arabic: حديقة زاكوما الوطنية) is a 3,000 km^{2} (1,158 sq mi) national park in southeastern Chad, straddling the border of Guéra Region and Salamat Region. Zakouma is the nation's oldest national park, declared a national park in 1963 by presidential decree, giving it the highest form of protection available under the nation's laws. It has been managed by the nonprofit conservation organization African Parks since 2010 in partnership with Chad's government.

== History ==
Zakouma is Chad's oldest national park, established by the nation's government in 1963. Its wildlife have been threatened by the ivory trade and poaching, including by Janjaweed members. In May 2007, militia forces attacked the park's headquarters for its stockpile of 1.5 tons of ivory seized from poachers over the years, and killed three rangers.

The Chadian government began working with African Parks in 2010 to help manage and protect the park and its wildlife, especially elephants. The park's anti-poaching strategy includes equipping approximately 60 rangers with GPS tracking units and radios to improve communications, mobility, and safety, as well as improving mobility through the use of horses and other vehicles. The European Union pledged €6.9m in 2011 to help protect the park for five years.

Elephant protection efforts expanded outside the park's boundaries in 2012, and an airstrip was constructed in Heban to make monitoring of the migrating animals easier. In August, Heban rangers destroyed a camp belonging to members of the Sudanese army after four elephants were killed. Three weeks later, the poachers attacked the Zakouma outpost at Heban and shot and killed multiple guards. Following the attack, additional bases were built, a second aircraft was purchased, and a rapid response team called the "Mambas" (after the snake of the same name) was formed to enhance security. 23 guards were killed protecting Zakouma since 1998, including seven in 2007, four between 2008 and 2010, and six in 2012.

Chadians celebrated the park's fiftieth anniversary in February 2014. Zakouma held a ceremony to commemorate the occasion, which was attended by President Idriss Déby and included a ceremonial destruction of ivory by burning a pyre with a ton elephant tusks to discourage poaching.

African Parks and the Labuschagnes, who served as the park's managers from 2011 to 2017, have been credited with reducing poaching and increasing Zakouma's elephant population. African Parks took over management of ecologically valuable lands surrounding Zakouma, including the Siniaka-Minia Faunal Reserve and Bahr Salamat Faunal Reserve, in 2017.

== Flora and fauna ==
Zakouma National Park is part of the Sudano-Sahelian vegetation zone, and has shrubland, high grasses and Acacia forests. Plants recorded in the park include Combretaceae and Vachellia seyal.

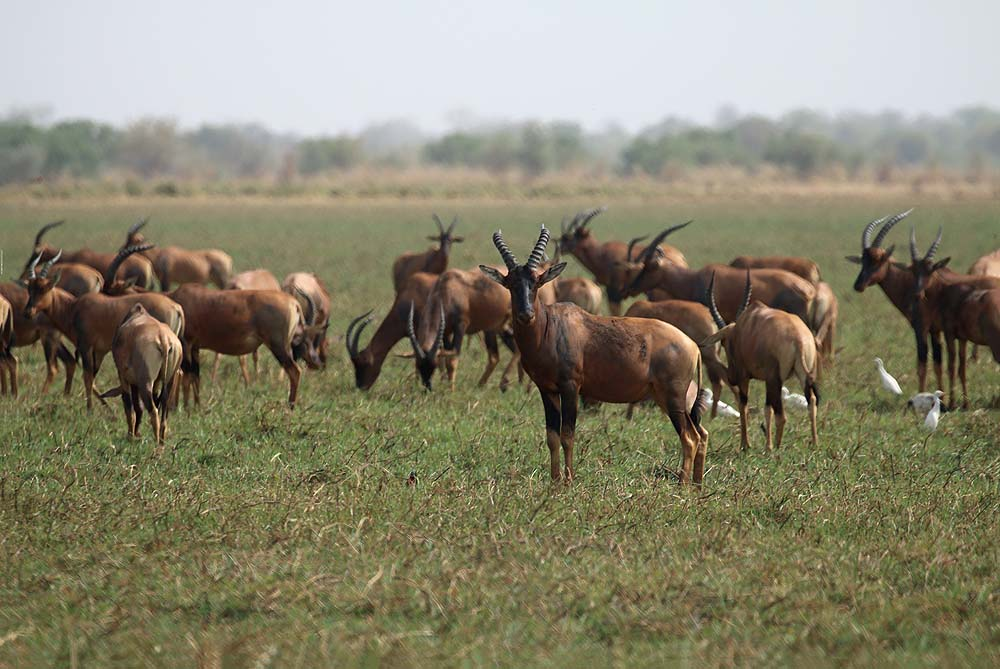
Tiang at Rigueik in the park

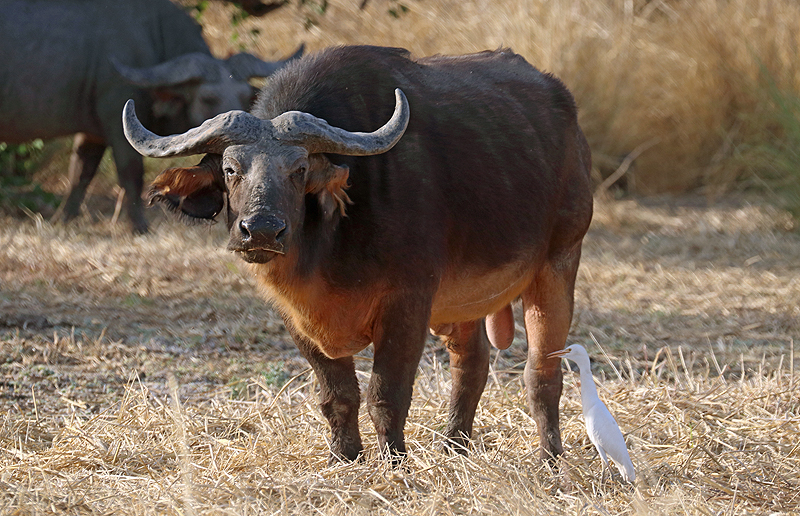
African buffalo in Zakouma National Park

Large mammals in Zakouma National Park include the African buffalo, African bush elephant, Kordofan giraffe, greater kudu, hartebeest, tiang, African leopard and lion. It has been estimated that 60% of the global Kordofan giraffe population is living in Zakouma National Park.

During a study of the park's terrestrial small mammals, nine rodent and two shrew species were recorded, including the African grass rat, Congo gerbil, Guinea multimammate mouse, Heuglin's striped grass mouse, Johan's spiny mouse, Kemp's gerbil, Matthey's mouse, African striped ground squirrel and Verheyen's multimammate mouse. Shrew species reported in the study were the savanna shrew and another belonging to the genus Suncus.

Zakouma National Park has been designated an Important Bird Area (IBA) by BirdLife International because it supports significant populations of the black crowned crane, red-throated bee-eater, black-breasted barbet, Niam-Niam parrot, sun lark, red-pate cisticola, purple starling, Gambaga flycatcher, Heuglin's masked weaver and black-rumped waxbill.

=== Elephants ===
Zakouma National Park's elephant population experienced significant declines during the 2000s, although reported size estimates have varied from more than 4,000 elephants in 2002, to fewer than 900 in 2005, and approximately 400–450 by 2010. There were an estimated 4,300–4,350 elephants in Zakouma in 2002. There were 3,885 and 3,020 elephants in the park in 2005 and 2006, respectively. There were approximately 450 elephants in the park between late 2012 and April 2015. Following the nonprofit conservation organization African Parks' assumption of management in 2010, and its extensive law enforcement and community engagement efforts, poaching dramatically declined and the herd has since stabilized, and has started to breed again. The park had 636 elephants as of 2021.

More than 100 elephants were killed in 2006. Seven elephants were reportedly killed in 2007, marking a massive decrease compared to previous years due to improved efforts to protect Zakouma National Park's wildlife. Sixty elephants were reportedly killed by Sudanese poachers in early 2010, prior to African Parks' involvement. In 2015, CNN reported that there were no elephants poached in the park since late 2011, and no ivory removed from Zakouma in the previous five years. There were very few, if any, known elephant births between 2010 and 2012 due to environmental stresses, but 23 calves were born in 2013, approximately 50 calves were born in 2014–15, and 70 were born in 2016. There were reportedly no elephant poaching incidents since 2016.

=== Black rhinoceros ===
The last black rhinoceros was sighted in Zakouma National Park in 1972. During 2015–2016, African Parks initiated plans to reintroduce black rhinos to the park. Following the signature of a memorandum of understanding between the governments of Chad and South Africa in 2017, six black rhinos were provided by the latter nation's Department of Environmental Affairs to Zakouma under a custodianship agreement. Two of the rhinos died in October. Another two were found dead in the following month, leaving only two rhinos, both of them females; the two remaining individuals are being closely monitored. On 6 December 2023, five more black rhinos arrived in Zakouma National Park, five years after the four black rhinos died. Originally, six black rhinos were set to be moved, but one of the bulls had a history of depression, and as such, was eventually excluded.

== Tourism ==
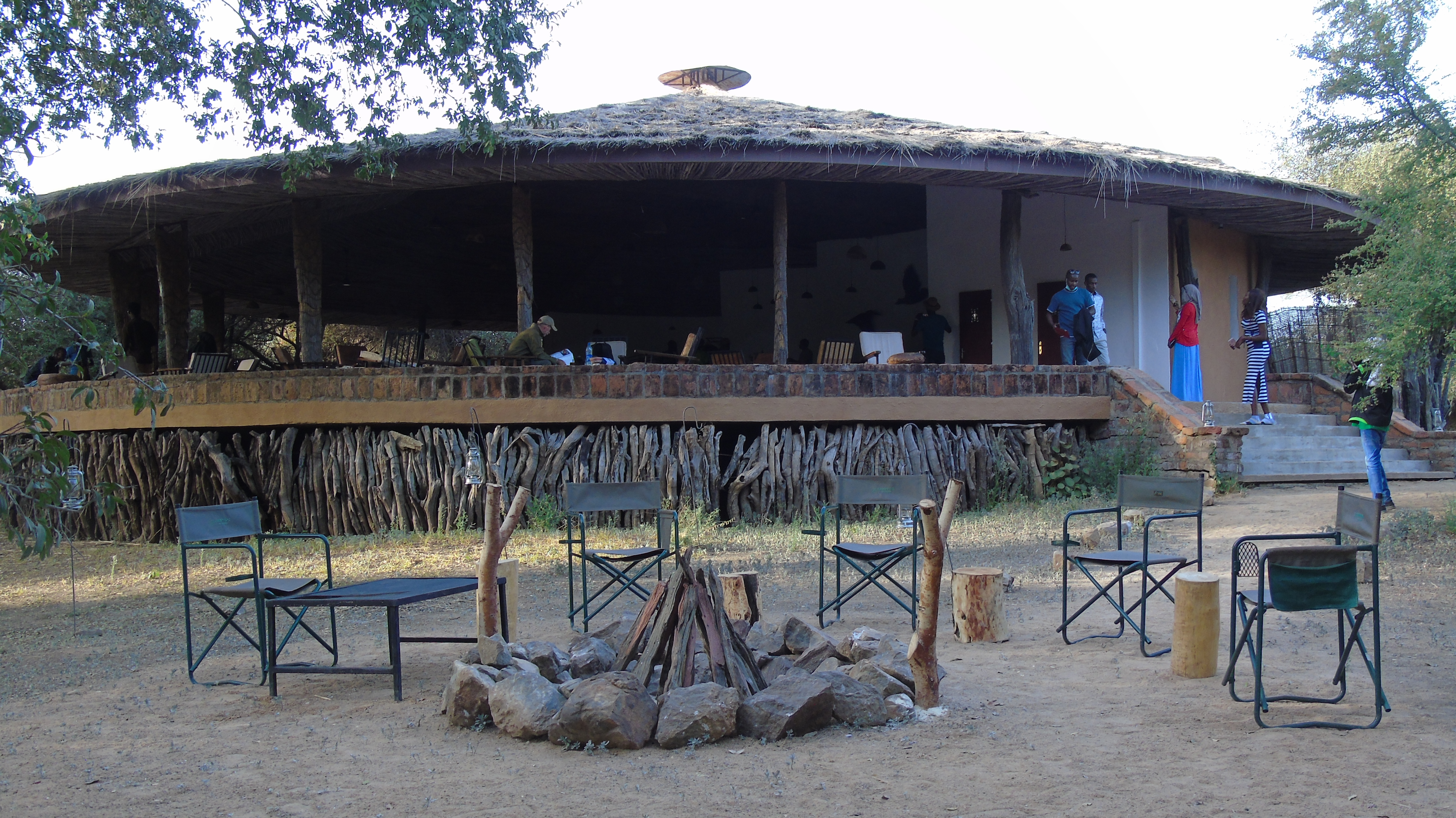
The restoration of Camp Tinga

In 2016, more than 5,000 locals stayed at the park's camps. Tinga Lodge, constructed by the government, opened in 1968 and houses up to 48 people. Camp Nomade, a mobile safari camp, had its first guest on 13 January 2015.

== See also ==
- Wildlife of Chad
