= Abou Telfane Faunal Reserve =

Protected area in Chad

- IUCN category IV (habitat/species management area)
- Location within Chad
- Location: Guéra Region, Chad
- Nearest city: Mongo
- Coordinates: 12.082°N 18.91°E
- Area: 1,100 km^{2} (420 sq mi)
- Established: 1955

The Abou Telfane Faunal Reserve is a protected area located in Chad. It was established in 1955. The fauna reserve covers 1,100 km^{2} (420 sq mi).
