= Siniaka-Minia National Park =

National park in Chad

- IUCN category IV (habitat/species management area)
- Interactive map of Siniaka-Minia National Park
- Location: Chad
- Area: 4,260 km^{2} (1,640 sq mi)
- Established: 1965

The Siniaka-Minia National Park is located in the regions of Guéra and Moyen-Chari in Chad. It was established as an IUCN Category IV area in 1965 covering an area of 4,260 km^{2} (1,640 sq mi), due its importance for preserving black rhinoceros. Siniaka-Minia has been managed by the nonprofit conservation organization African Parks since 2017 in partnership with Chad's government following the success of the African Parks partnership in Zakouma National Park.

In 2023, Siniaka-Minia was promoted from a Reserve to a National Park. In addition to anti-poaching measures, the organization states some of its key priorities are wildlife monitoring and infrastructure development.

== Geography ==
The park is large plain terrain with a backdrop of a massif which rises to a height of 1,613 metres (5,292 ft). It is drained by the Siniaka River and Dorioum River, which are ephemeral in nature; some water holes remain for use during the summer months.

== Flora and fauna ==
The park has broad-ranging ecosystems, from savannahs to wetlands. Vegetation in the southern part of the reserve is of Sudan savanna while in the north it consists of thorny bushes.

While the reserve was established for the black rhinoceros, poaching led to local extinction in the late 1970s. Poaching has continued to be a threat as of 2024.

The reserve, apart from preserving many threatened species, also contains greater kudu, red-fronted gazelle, oribi, roan antelope, lion and cheetah.

In January and February of 2022, African Parks moved over 900 buffalo from Zakouma National Park to Siniaka-Minia, marking the largest buffalo translocation ever undertaken. Many of the animals came from a herd at the outskirts of Zakouma, which was at risk of spilling out of the protected area and into the agricultural lands of nearby communities.

== Conservation ==
Wild animals in the reserve are subject to degree of poaching by well armed hunters which has been difficult to control in view of lack adequate personnel and equipment to carry out effective surveillance operations. It would still need attention as there are sufficient number of mammal species which need to be conserved. African Parks states that one of the organizations key priorities is working with local law enforcement and improving anti-poaching measures.

The establishment as a national park caused issues with the local farmers. The Minister of the Environment, Fisheries and Sustainable Development agreed to support the residents with access to water as well as other measures to sustain the economy.
