= Larmanaye Faunal Reserve =

Protected area in Chad

- IUCN category IV (habitat/species management area)
- Location: Chad
- Area: 3,040 km^{2} (1,170 sq mi)
- Established: 1969

The Larmanaye Faunal Reserve has an area of 3040 km^{2} as it supports rare wildlife species It had been proposed initially by the local people as a total reserve to cover an area 882 km^{2}.
