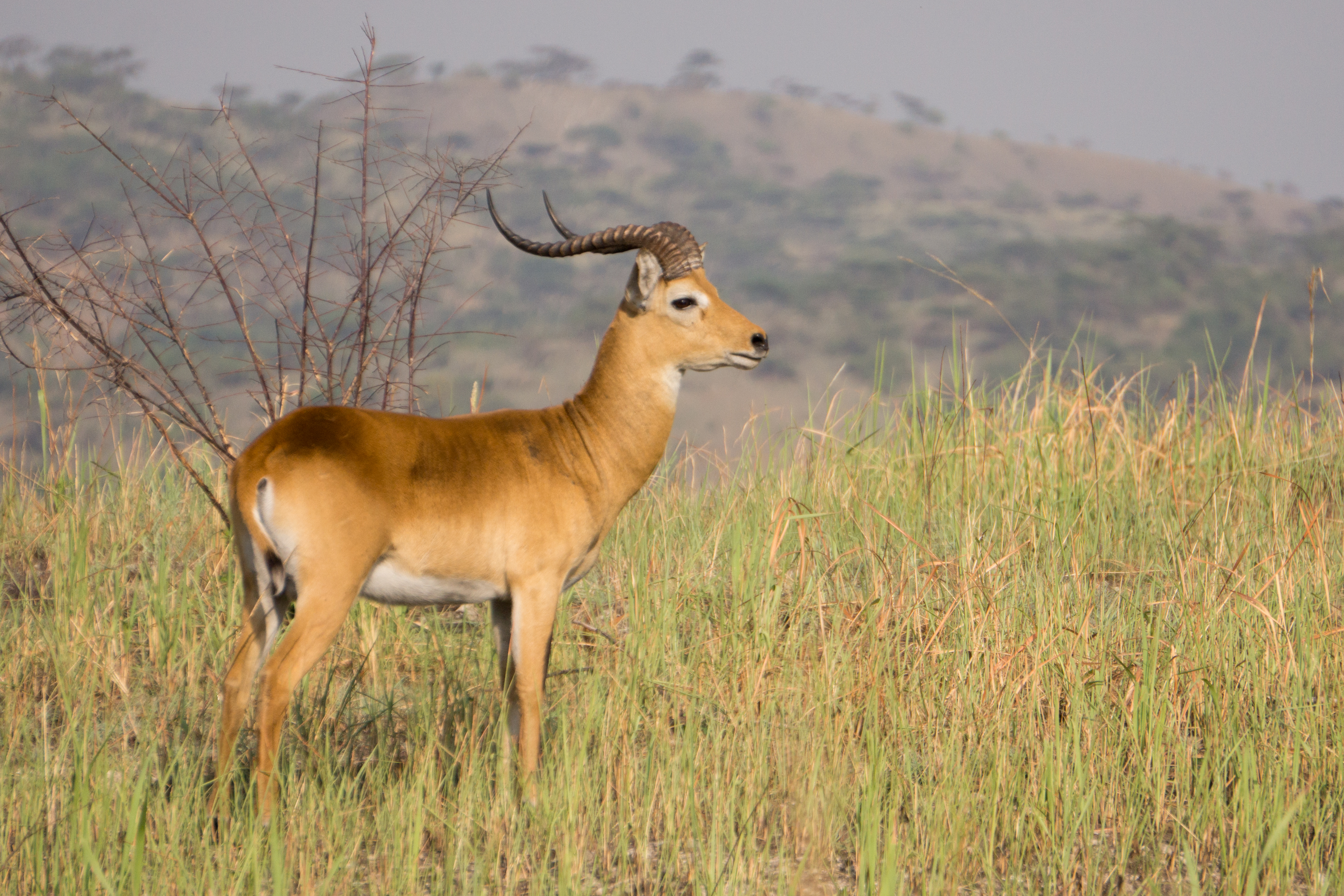
- Male; At the Queen Elizabeth National Park
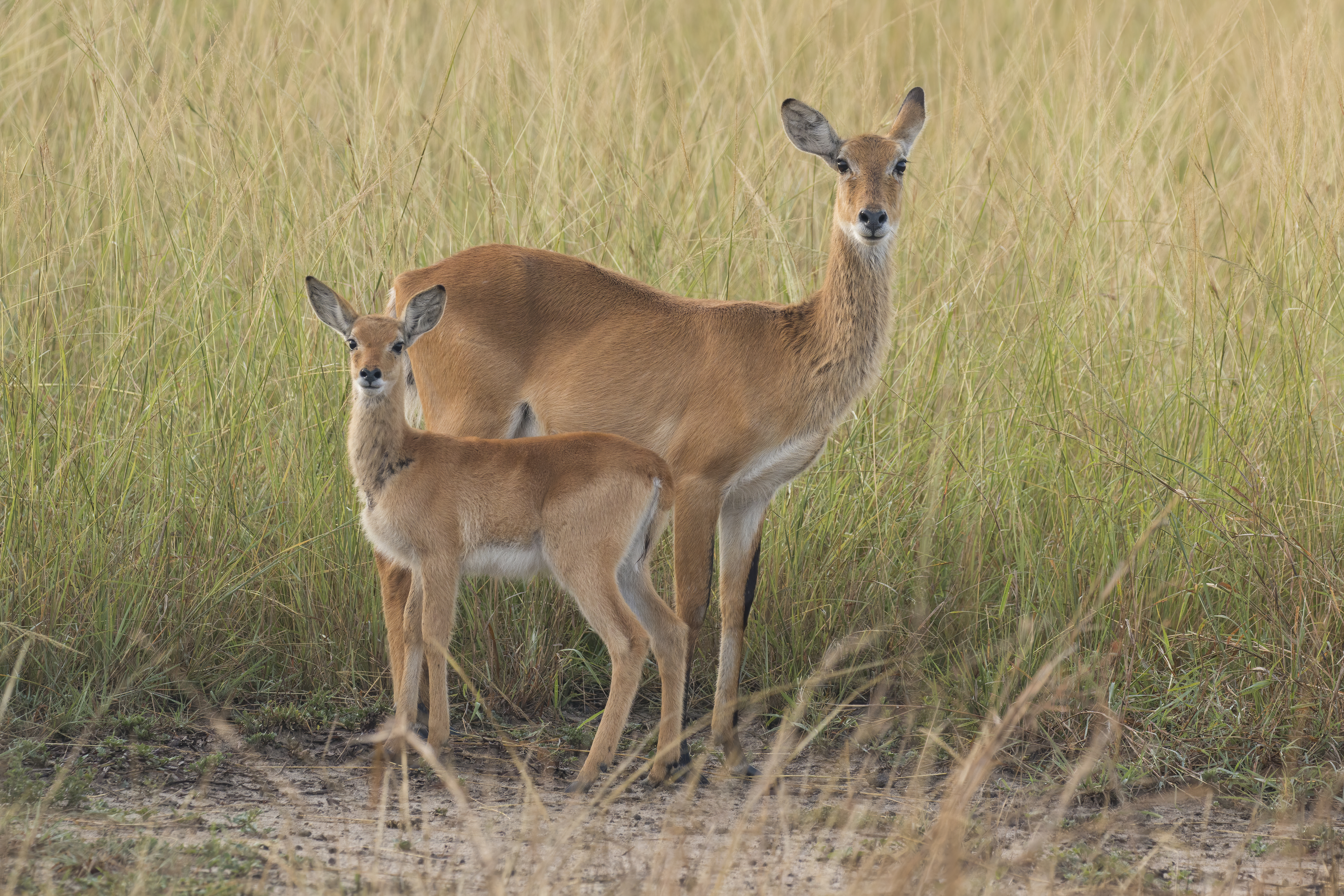
- Female and calf At the Semliki Wildlife Reserve; Both K. k. thomasi in Uganda

Conservation status
- Least Concern (IUCN 3.1)

Scientific classification
- Kingdom: Animalia
- Phylum: Chordata
- Class: Mammalia
- Order: Artiodactyla
- Family: Bovidae
- Genus: Kobus
- Species: K. kob

Binomial name
- Kobus kob (Erxleben, 1777)

Subspecies
- K. k. kob; K. k. thomasi; K. k. leucotis
- Geographic range

= Kob =

Species of mammal

The kob (Kobus kob) is an antelope found across Central Africa and parts of West Africa and East Africa. Together with the closely related reedbucks, waterbucks, lechwe, Nile lechwe, and puku, it forms the Reduncinae tribe. Found along the northern savanna, it is often seen in Murchison Falls and Queen Elizabeth National Park, Uganda; Garamba and Virunga National Park, and the Democratic Republic of the Congo, as well as grassy floodplains of South Sudan. Kob are found in wet areas (such as floodplains), where they eat grasses. Kob are diurnal, but inactive during the heat of the day. They live in groups of either females and calves or just males. These groups generally range from five to forty animals.

Among the kobs of eastern Africa, the Ugandan kob (Kobus kob thomasi) appears on the coat of arms of Uganda, and white-eared kob (Kobus kob leucotis), found in South Sudan, southwest Ethiopia, and extreme northeast Uganda, participate in large-scale migrations.

== Description ==
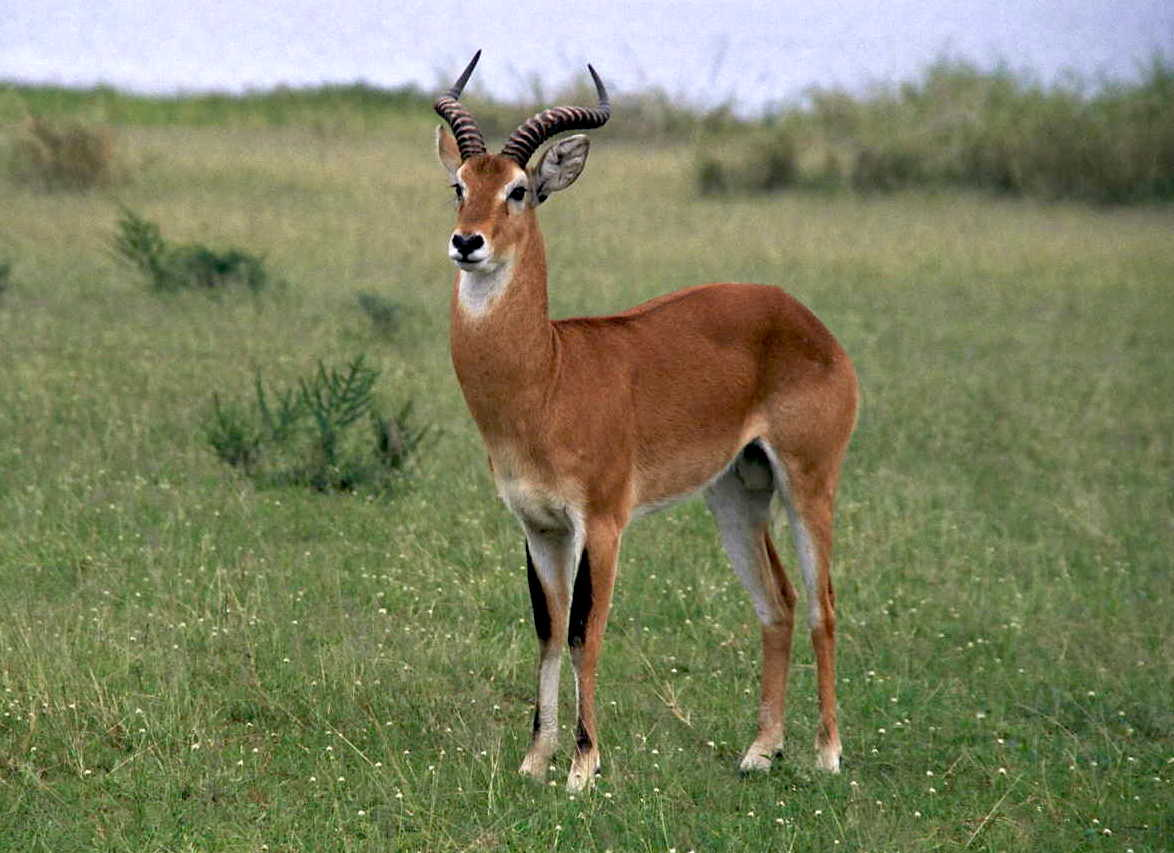
Ugandan kob at Murchison Falls NP

The kob resembles the impala but is more heavily built. Males are more robust than females and have horns. Males have shoulder heights of 90–100 cm (35–39 in) and an average weight of 94 kg (207 lb). Females have shoulder heights of 82–92 cm (32–36 in) and weigh on average 63 kg (139 lb). The pelage of the kob is typically golden to reddish-brown overall, but with the throat patch, eye ring, and inner ear being white, and the forelegs being black at the front. Males get darker as they get older. Those of the white-eared kob (K. k. leucotis), which is found in the Sudd region (the easternmost part of their range), are strikingly different and overall dark, rather similar to the male Nile lechwe, though with a white throat and no pale patch from the nape to the shoulder. Both sexes have well-developed inguinal glands that secrete a yellow, waxy substance, as well as preorbital glands.

== Range ==
The kob is currently found in Benin, Burkina Faso, Cameroon, Central African Republic, Chad, Ivory Coast, Democratic Republic of the Congo, Ethiopia, Ghana, Guinea, Guinea Bissau, Mali, Mauritania, Niger, Nigeria, Senegal, South Sudan, Togo, and Uganda. It was formerly also found in Gambia, Kenya, Sierra Leone, Morocco and Tanzania, but is now extinct in those areas.

== Ecology ==
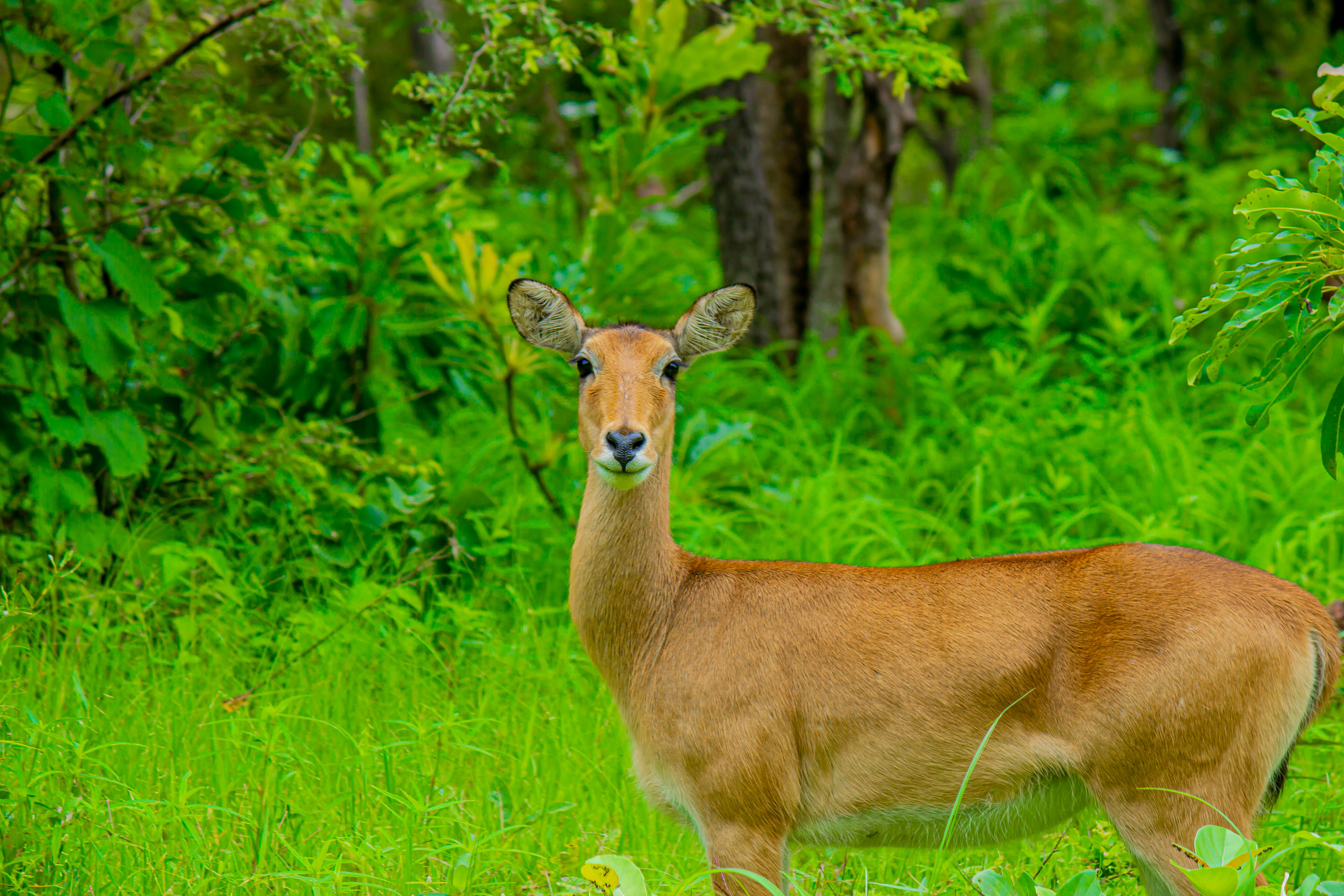
Kob at Mole National Park in Ghana

The kob's distribution from western Africa to central East Africa is patchy. It inhabits flat areas and open country close to permanent water, with consistent climate. It drinks daily and requires fresh grazing. During the rains, kob frequent short grasses and keep them short. Since it is dependent on water, the kob does not wander far into arid areas. Kob gather on and move from one pasture to another, coinciding with seasonal changes. In flooded areas, they may travel hundreds of kilometers, and dry-season walks to water may take 10 km (6.2 mi) or more. Grasses preferred by kobs are Hyparrhenia species, Brachiaria brizantha, Setaria gayanus, Chloris gayana, and Echinochloa and Digitaria spp.

== Social behavior and life history ==
Female kob can live in herds numbering in the thousands. They move more and are more social than territorial males. Females are at the front of the daily movements to water. Individuals learn where to go from their mothers. However, in larger herds, the females take their signals from other females. Males are also present in the migratory herds and follow the females. All-male herds may number in the hundreds and accompany females as they travel during dry season.

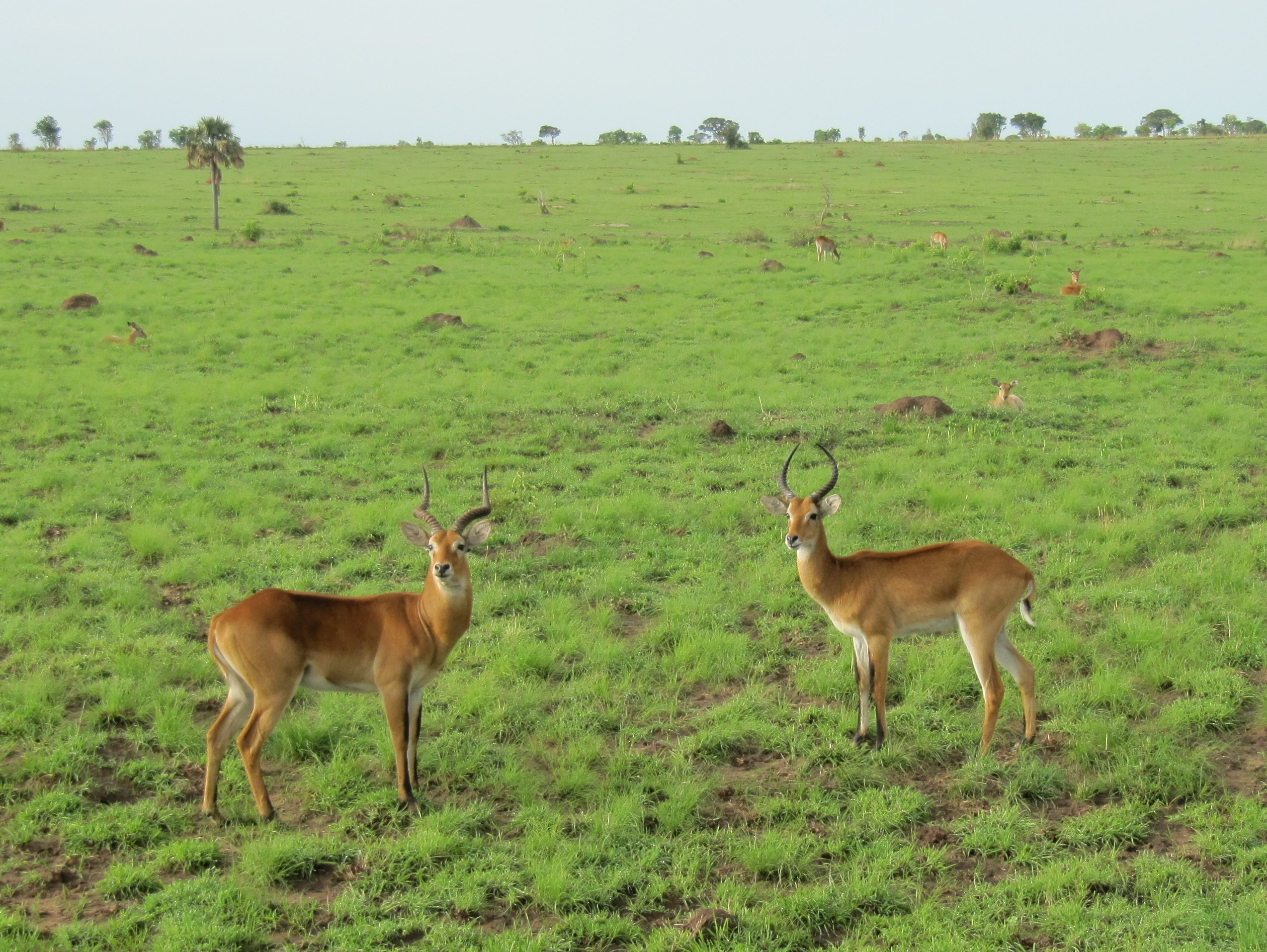
Gathering of kobs at Murchison Falls National Park

The social and reproductive organization of kob can vary. When in average or low population densities, males establish conventional territories and do not travel much. Adult males try to establish their territories in the best habitat available, which are inhabited by herds of females and their young. Herds are fluid and change in size and structure as individuals travel to find green vegetation. Other males, particularly young males, live in bachelor herds and are segregated from the females by the territorial males. On floodplains, where kob are densely populated, around two-thirds of the territorial males establish traditional territories, while the rest live in clustered territories known as leks. These clusters are sometimes smaller than a single traditional territory. Lek clusters are located on patches of short grass or bare ground within comparably tall grassland. As such, these territories have little to no value other than to the males that reside in them. About eight or nine of every ten females visit leks to mate, trading spacing and food for mating success. The kob tends to live in smaller herds consisting of 5 to 15 individual kob, but herds as many as 40+ have been observed. Females and bachelor males live in large herds of up to 2000 and move through the leks, which are surrounded by high-quality grass and are near waterholes and commonly travelled routes.

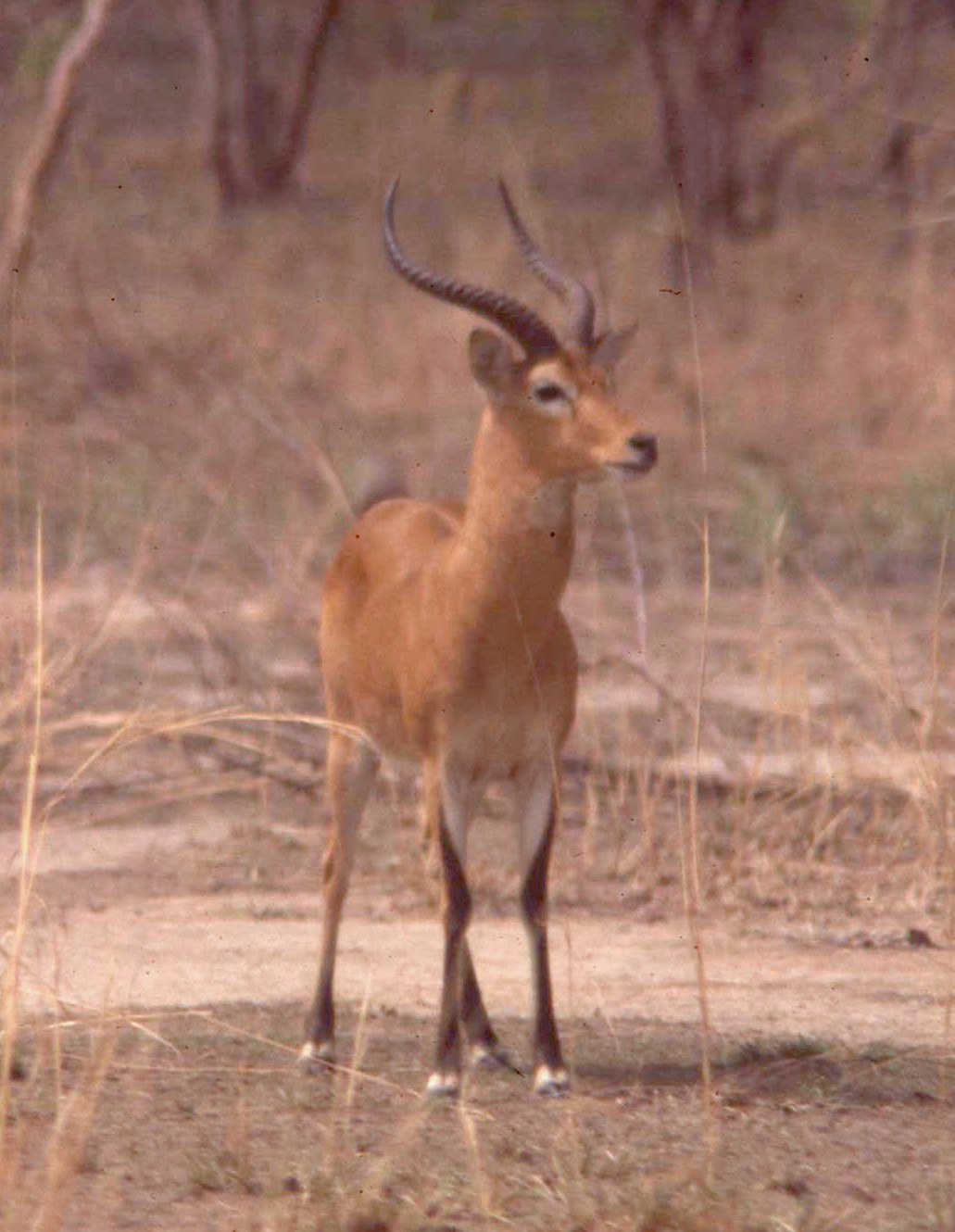
Kob at Côte d'Ivoire

Conflicts between territorial Ugandan kob (K. k. thomasi) are usually settled with ritual and rarely actual fighting, whether in conventional territories or leks. A male usually needs only to walk in an erect posture towards the intruder to displace him. Neighboring males in leks do the same thing when they encounter their borders. Lek-holding white-eared kobs fight more often. Ugandan kob do sometimes sustain serious or fatal injuries, especially when control of a territory is at stake. Fights usually involve the combatants clashing, pressing and twisting each other with their horns head-on. However, a neighbor may attack from the rear or side. In lek clusters, the most dominant males occupy the center. The number of males in the center of a lek cluster ranges from three to seven, and their leks are the most clustered and they monopolize copulations with estrous females. Replacement of males in leks are much more common than in traditional territories, and most males are able to stay in the centre positions for only a day or two and rarely up to a week. This is largely due to intense competition and because most males leave their territories to feed and drink. Centrally located males reduce their chances of being replaced by leaving to feed during periods of relative calmness, yet they are not able to get enough food and water and have to eventually leave their leks. However, a male can gain enough energy after a week or two, and try to take back his position. At every lek cluster, males are always waiting take or retake a central lek. Males in traditional territories are able to stay for at least a year or two.

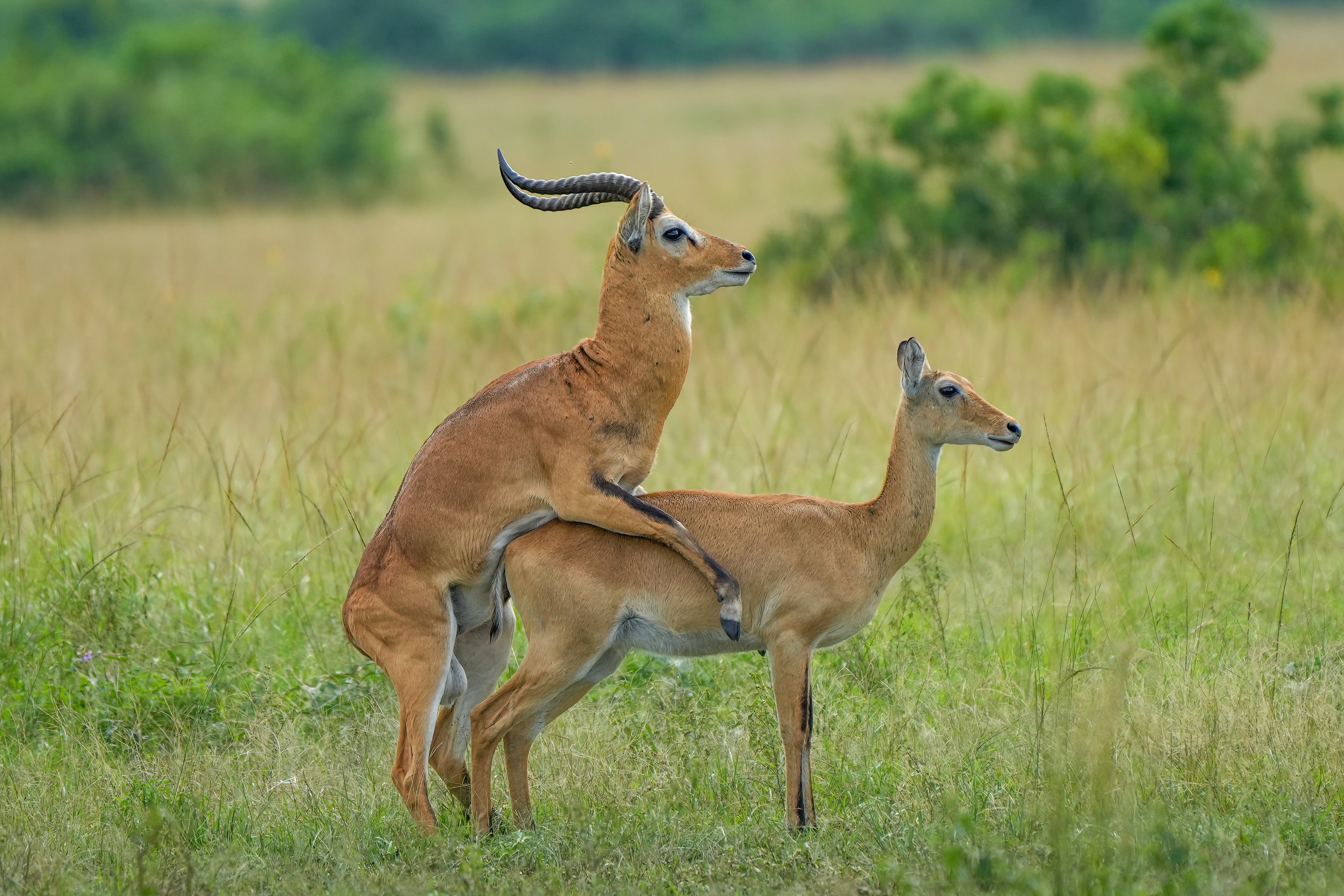
Ugandan kobs mating

Females have their first ovulation at 13–14 months of age and have 20- to 26-day intervals between estrous cycles until they are fertilized. Males from traditional territories and leks have different courtship strategies. Males of traditional territories will herd females and keep them in their territories. Lek males try to do the same, but usually fail. They have to rely on advertising themselves. Kob courtship may last as short as two minutes, and copulation may only last a few seconds. At leks, a female may mate up to 20 times with at least one of the central males in a day. After an eight-month gestation period and giving birth, estrus may commence 21–64 days later. For their first month, calves hide in dense vegetation. Mother and calf can identify each other by their noses. As they get older, calves gather into crèches. When they are three to four months old, the young enter the females' herds and stay with mothers until six to seven months, by which time they are weaned. When they mature, males join bachelors groups.

== Status ==
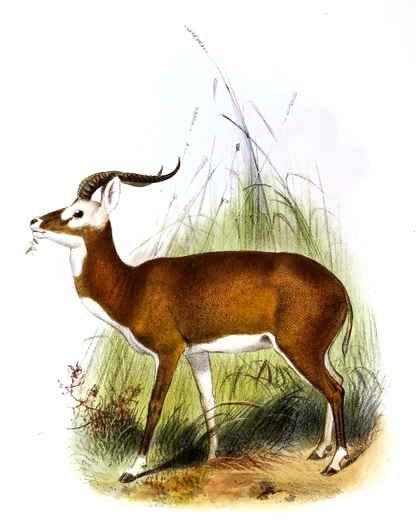
The white-eared kob (K. k. leucotis) is a dark subspecies from the Sudd and nearby regions.

Kob populations have been reduced by hunting and human development. The Ugandan kob (Kobus kob thomasi) became extinct in southwestern Kenya and northwestern Tanzania due to the expansion of human settlements and agriculture. However, there are sizeable populations of this subspecies in Murchison Falls and Queen Elizabeth National Park in Uganda and Garamba and Virunga National Park in the Democratic Republic of the Congo.

Buffon's kob (Kobus kob kob) is protected in several parks, including Niokolo-Koba in Senegal, Comoé in Côte d'Ivoire, Arly-Singou in Burkina Faso, Mole and Bui in Ghana, Pendjari in Benin, Waza, Bénoué and Faro National Parks of the North Province of Cameroon, Zakouma in Chad, and Manovo-Gounda-St. Floris and Dzanga Sangha Forest Reserve in the Central African Republic.

Once feared almost extinct because of the Second Sudanese Civil War (1983–2005), surveys in 2007 and later confirmed that several hundred thousand white-eared kobs (Kobus kob leucotis) survived. Together with tiang and Mongalla gazelles, they participate in one of the largest mammal migrations on Earth, numbering about 1.2 million individuals in total. The white-eared kob is protected in Boma National Park and Bandingilo National Park in South Sudan, and Gambella National Park in Ethiopia.
