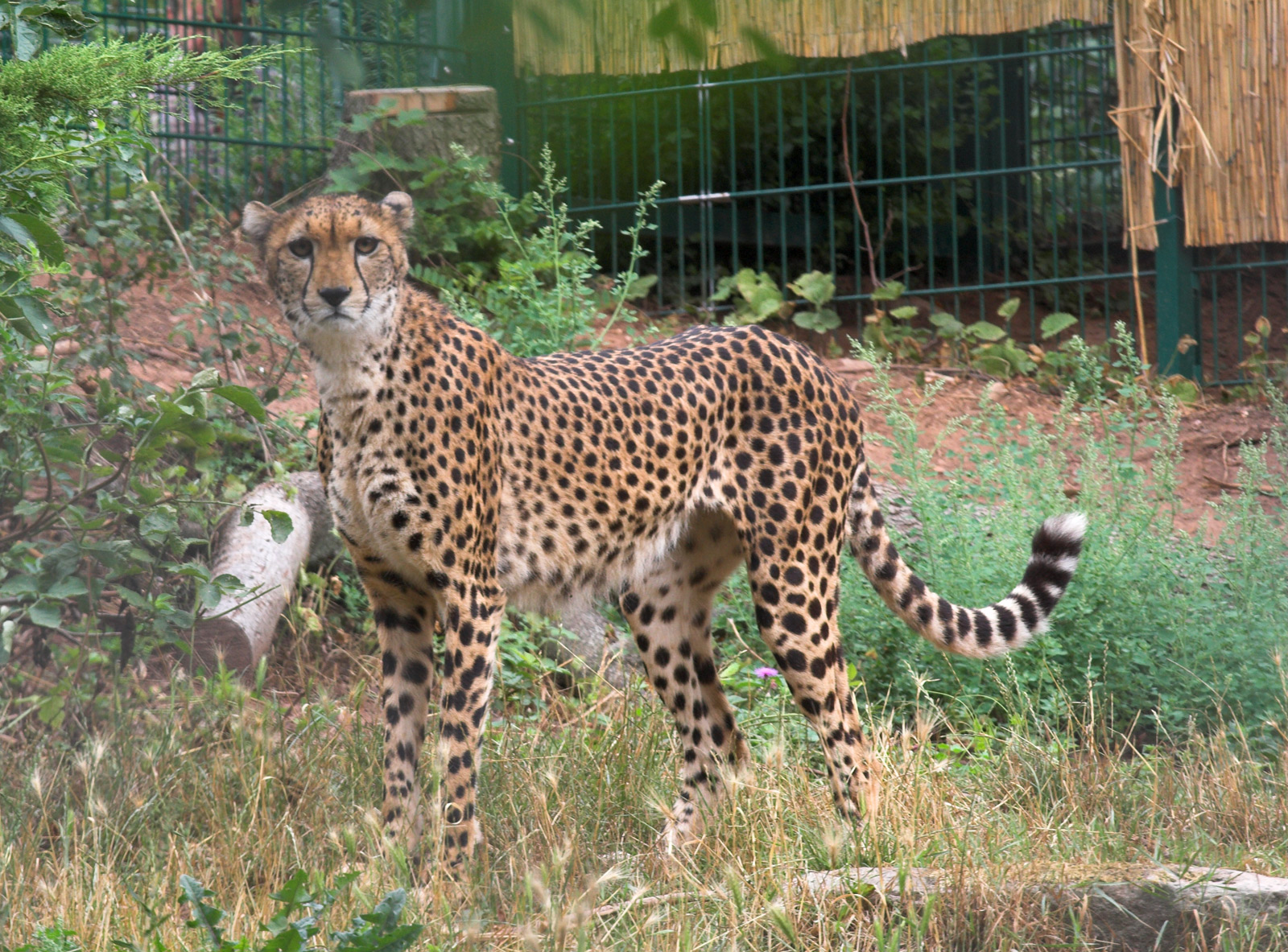
- A female cheetah in Zoo Landau, Germany

Conservation status
- Endangered (IUCN 3.1)

Scientific classification
- Kingdom: Animalia
- Phylum: Chordata
- Class: Mammalia
- Order: Carnivora
- Family: Felidae
- Genus: Acinonyx
- Species: A. jubatus
- Subspecies: A. j. soemmeringii

Trinomial name
- Acinonyx jubatus soemmeringii (Fitzinger, 1855)
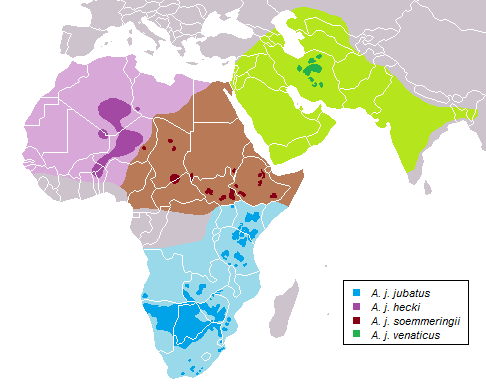
- A. j. soemmeringii range (brown)

Synonyms
- A. j. megabalica (Heuglin), 1863; A. j. wagneri (Hilzheimer), 1913

= Northeast African cheetah =

Subspecies of carnivore

The Northeast African cheetah (Acinonyx jubatus soemmeringii) is a cheetah subspecies occurring in Northeast Africa. Contemporary records are known in South Sudan, Uganda, and Ethiopia, but population status in Eritrea, Djibouti, Somalia, Kenya, and Sudan is unknown.

It was first described under the scientific name Cynailurus soemmeringii by the Austrian zoologist Leopold Fitzinger in 1855 on the basis of a specimen from Sudan's Bayuda Desert brought to the Tiergarten Schönbrunn in Vienna. It is also known as the Sudan cheetah.

In the 1970s, the cheetah population in Ethiopia, Sudan and Somalia was roughly estimated at 1,150 to 4,500 individuals. In 2024, it was estimated that 533 individuals live inside protected areas in this region; the number of individuals living outside protected areas is unknown.

This subspecies is more closely related to the Southern African cheetah than to Saharan cheetah populations. Results of a phylogeographic analysis indicate that the two subspecies diverged between 16,000 and 72,000 years ago.

== Taxonomy ==
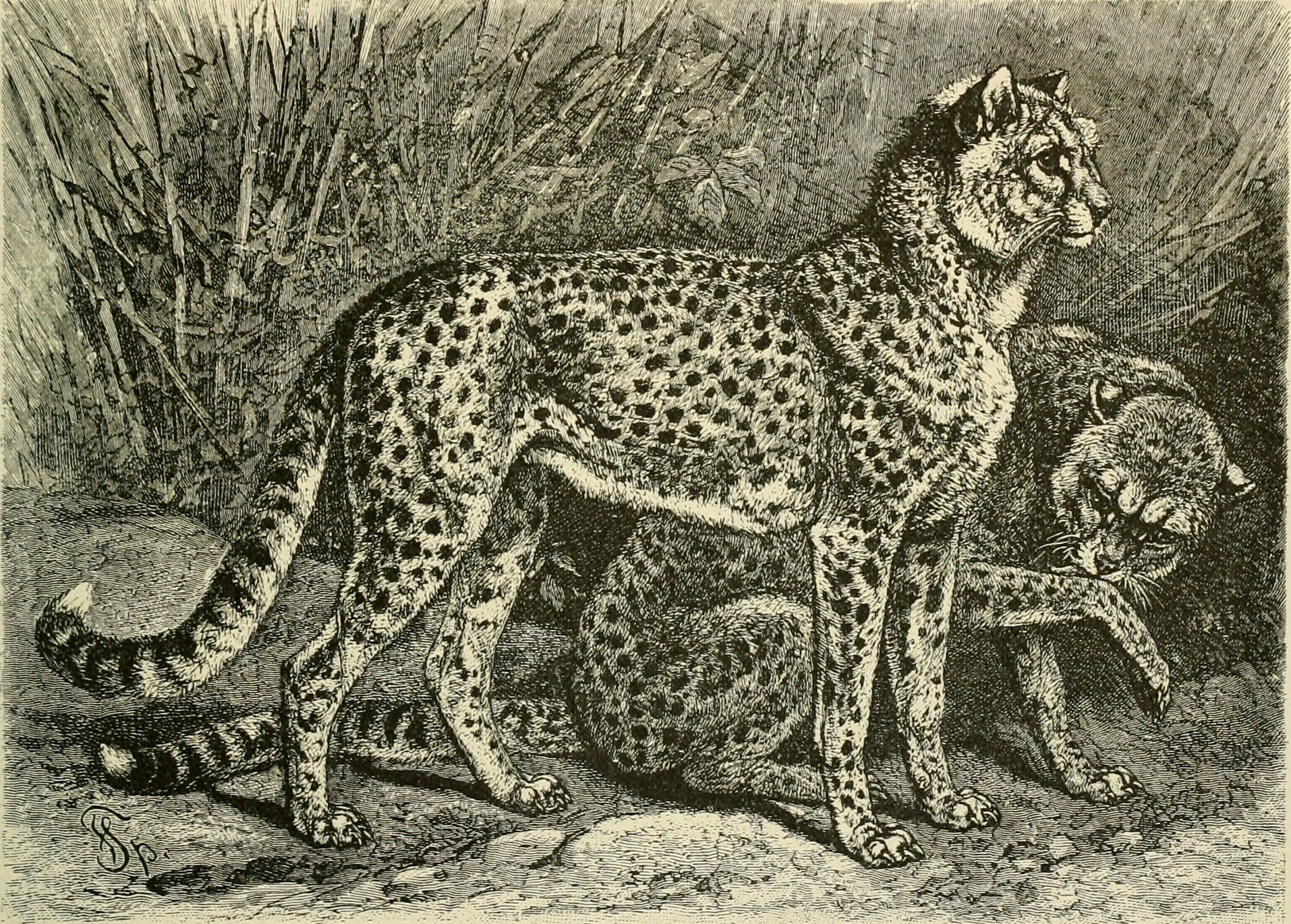
An illustration of cheetahs from Fahhad, Abyssania by Alfred Edmund Brehm, 1895

Cynailurus soemmeringii was the scientific name proposed by Leopold Fitzinger in 1855, when he described a live male cheetah brought by Theodor von Heuglin from Sudan's Bayuda Desert in Kordofan to Tiergarten Schönbrunn in Vienna. The name honoured Samuel Thomas von Soemmerring.

Following Fitzinger's description, other naturalists and zoologists described cheetahs from other parts of Northeast Africa that today are considered synonyms of A. j. soemmeringii:

- Felis megabalica was proposed by Theodor von Heuglin in 1863 who described a cheetah skin purchased at the western bank of Bahr-el-Abiad. Heuglin stated that it was brought from further inland. The scientific name consists of the Greek roots mega (much) and "balios" (spotted).
- Acinonyx wagneri proposed by Max Hilzheimer in 1913 was a cheetah specimen from Kordofan in Sudan. Hilzheimer named it in honour of Johann Andreas Wagner.

== Evolution ==
For a phylogeographic study, 95 cheetah samples were used, such as feces from wild cheetahs collected in Iran, tissue samples from captive and confiscated cheetahs, hair and bone samples from museum specimens. Study results revealed that the Northeast African cheetah and the Southern African cheetah are genetically different from each other and from the Asiatic cheetah. The Northeast African cheetah probably diverged from the Southern African cheetah between 32,200 and 244,000 years ago. Therefore, it was proposed that it deserves a subspecific status.

== Physical characteristics ==
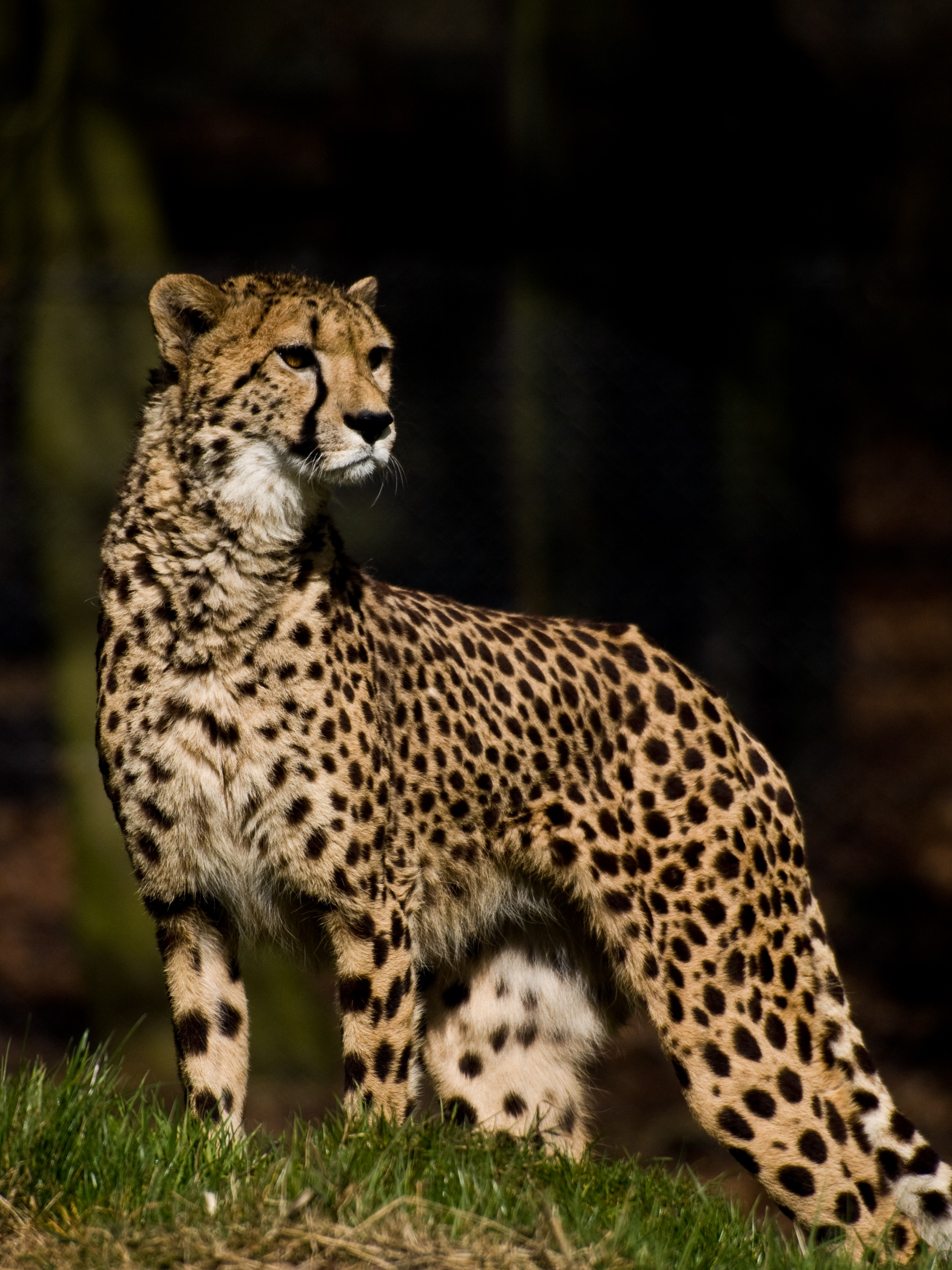
At Whipsnade Zoo, Bedfordshire

Like its relative to the south in East Africa, the Northeast African cheetah is fairly large. Physically, it most resembles the East African cheetah; it has a densely ochraceous spotted coat with relatively thick and coarse fur in comparison to its relatives from eastern and northwestern Africa. The belly of the Northeast African cheetah is distinctly white while its breast and throat can have some black spots similar to the eastern subspecies. However, it is the darkest in fur color. This cheetah has the most widespread and separated black dorsal spots, but smaller than that of the East African cheetah's. In contrast to the East African cheetah, the Northeast African cheetah has no spots on the hind feet, although some among the Chadian population have spotted hind legs. This cheetah has distinct white patches around its eyes but the facial spotting can vary from very dense to relatively thin. The Northeast African cheetah has been seen with both white and black tipped tails, although certain cheetahs' tails are white tipped. This subspecies' tail is also notably thick.

This subspecies has the largest head size, but sometimes can get relatively smaller. However, it does not have mustache markings. The tear marks of this cheetah are highly inconsistent, but they are frequently thickest at the mouth corners, unlike those of the other four subspecies. This cheetah is the only subspecies not being reported to show a rare color variation. However, despite having the darkest fur color, certain cheetahs' fur color can be pale yellow or almost white as well. In cold climates, such as in Whipsnade Zoo, Northeast African cheetahs are the only African subspecies that can develop fluffy winter fur coats, although they are less developed than that of the Asiatic cheetah's.

== Distribution and habitat ==
The Northeast African cheetah is regionally extinct in Eritrea and Djibouti. In 2007, the estimated total Northeast African cheetah population approximated 950 individuals. In Ethiopia, this subspecies is resident in Omo, Gambella, Aledeghi, Mago, and Yangudi Rassa National Parks, and in Borena Zone, Ogaden, Afar and the neighbouring Blen-Afar Regions. In South Sudan, populations are known in Boma, Southern, Radom and Badingilo National Parks.

It inhabits wide open lands, grasslands, semi-arid areas, and other open habitats where prey is abundant such as in the East Sudanian Savanna. It is rarely seen in northern regions of Sudan. Wild cheetahs have been spotted in An Nil al Azraq in southeastern Sudan.

== Ecology and behavior ==
=== Hunting and diet ===
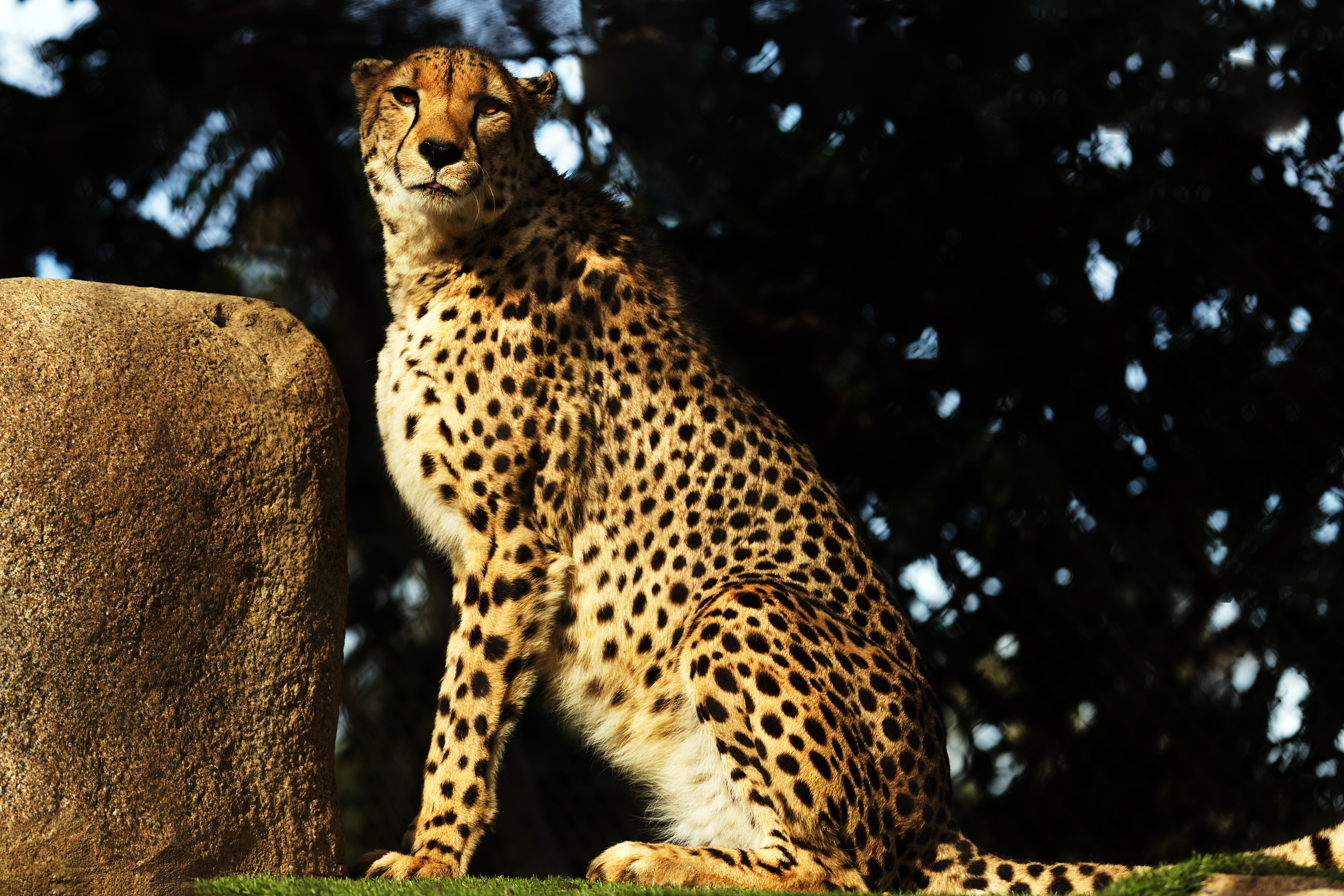
Northeast African cheetah

The cheetahs are carnivorous and mostly feed on herbivorous animals, such as Grant's gazelles, Cape hares, guineafowls and large animals like hartebeests, plains zebras and Barbary ostriches on few occasions. The Soemmerring's gazelles are the most preferable prey. However, lack of Soemmerring's gazelles in the Northeast African cheetah's region caused near extinction in Sudan.

=== Enemies and competitors ===
Like other subspecies, they are threatened and outranked by larger predators in their area, such as lions, leopards, spotted hyenas and wild dogs, as they can kill cheetahs and steal their carcasses. The cheetahs would surrender their meals to spotted and striped hyenas. Cheetahs are known to be unable to defend themselves against these predators. However, coalitions of male adult cheetahs can chase predators away. Additionally, a single cheetah can chase jackals, golden wolves and a lone wild dog away.

== Threats ==
The Northeast African cheetah is threatened by poaching, illegal wildlife trade, hunting, habitat loss, and lack of prey. There is an increasing rate of Northeast African cheetah cubs mostly from Somaliland being smuggled to Saudi Arabia, the United Arab Emirates and Yemen. Between 1972 and 2007, land-use changed considerably in Ethiopia's Afar Region. The extent of cultivated land increased by more than 700%, whereas woodland and grassland decreased by about 90%. The main cause for the reduction of woodland cover is firewood collection and charcoal production for sale, and use of wood for construction of houses.

The cheetah is highly threatened by the illegal pet trade from Somaliland. Cheetah cubs are sold on the black market for over $10,000 but rescuing a single cub costs more than three times that much. Most captive cheetah cubs are thought to die before export from Africa.

== Conservation ==
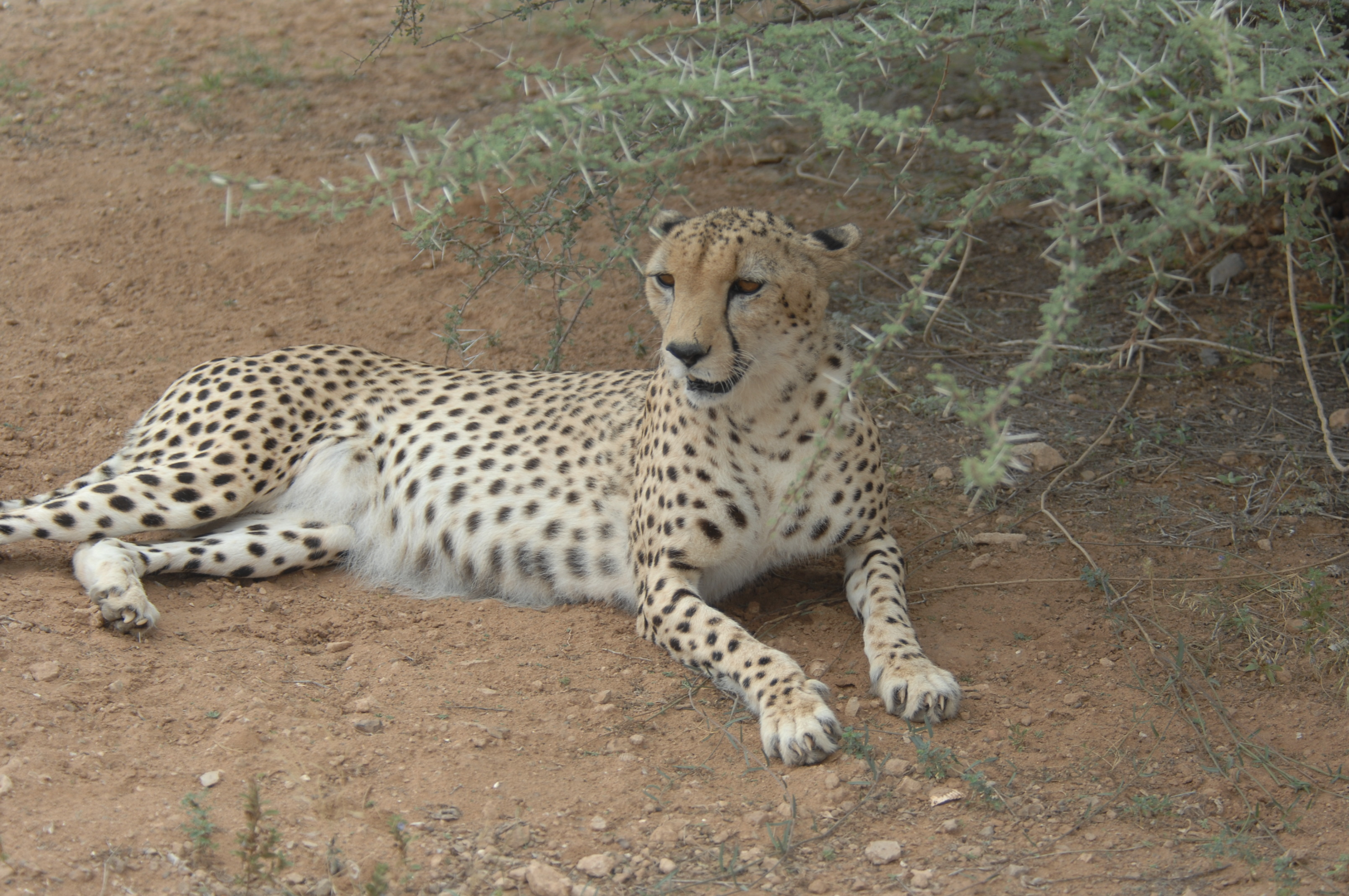
At the Djibouti Cheetah Refuge

=== Ethiopian Wildlife Conservation ===
The cheetah, together with the African wild dog, is considered emblematic of Ethiopia. A conservation project for wild animals started first in 2006 after "real lack of awareness in Ethiopia about the treatment of animals". The conservation goal is to ensure the increasing populations of cheetahs and other threatened wild animals in Ethiopia. The Ethiopian Wildlife Conservation Authority has confiscated cheetah cubs from wildlife trade in Ethiopia, many of which have been rehomed by Born Free, at their wildlife sanctuary Ensessa Kotteh.

=== Semi-captive breeding program ===
There is a reproduction programme for the cheetah at the Djibouti Cheetah Refuge in Djibouti City, which first started in 2004. The Djibouti Cheetah Refuge (also known as DECAN Cheetah Refuge) was first constructed in 2002 and the initial phase was opened a year later.

=== Rewilding project in Arabia ===
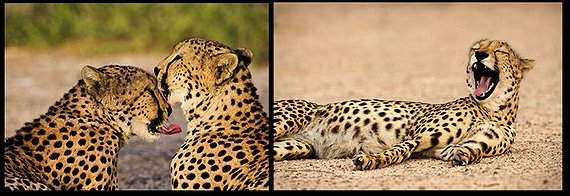
Cheetahs in Sir Bani Yas, the UAE

There is also a rewilding project from the Breeding Centre for Endangered Arabian Wildlife for cheetahs breeding in wildlife parks and those in captivity in the Middle-East, such as in the Arabian Wildlife Park from Sir Bani Yas, the Al-Ain Zoo and Sharjah's Arabian Wildlife Centre from the United Arab Emirates.

Asiatic cheetahs once lived in the Arabian Peninsula until they became regionally extinct everywhere in the wild of the Middle-East in the early 1970s. The rewilding project officially started in 2008, when four captive-born Northeast African cheetahs had been reintroduced into the wild of Sir Bani Yas Island to roam free and maintain natural balance. The cheetahs are taught to breed, to survive and feed on sand and mountain gazelle on their own, then their offspring would successfully learn those instincts from their parents.

Cheetahs are known to be difficult to breed and therefore, the survival rate of cheetah cubs is low both in the wild and in captivity. However, the project has been successful so far. In April 2010, the first four cheetah cubs had been born on the island from a successfully rewilded Northeast African cheetah mother named 'Safira'. According to conservation team, the cubs' mother had done an impressive job in taking care of her children. The cubs are recognized to be the first wild-born cheetahs in Arabia in 40 years.

The Al-Wabra Wildlife Preservation (AWWP) from Qatar, Al-Dhaid Wildlife Centre from Sharjah, the Nakelee Wildlife Centre and the Wadi Al-Safa Wildlife Centre from Dubai are also part of the international breeding programme to help save the rare cheetah population which are breeding in captivity. The breeding programmes of the Middle-East are aiming to release the cheetah into the wild of Africa. There are currently 23 adults and 7 cubs in Wadi Al-Safa.

=== In captivity ===
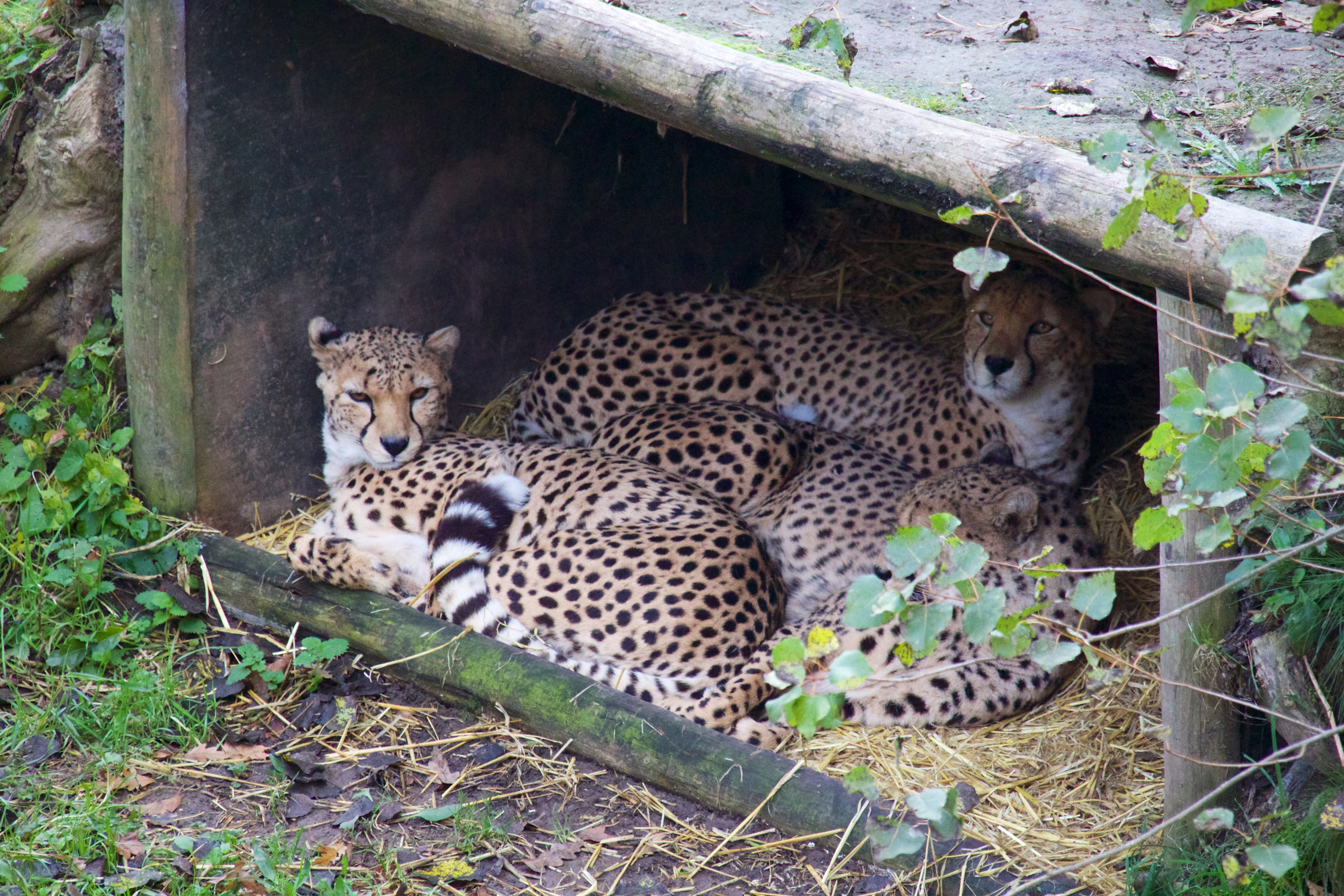
Cheetahs in Chester Zoo

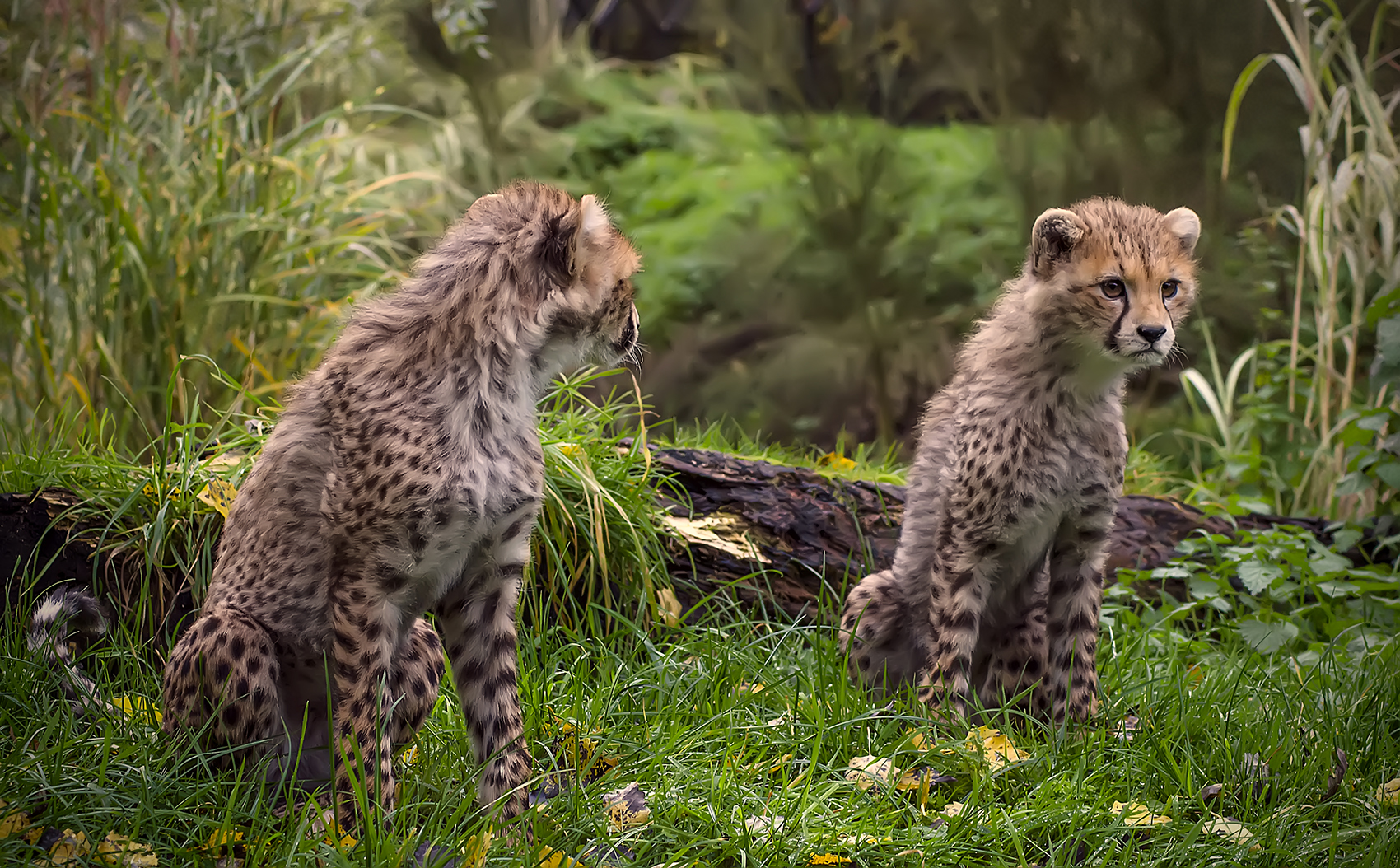
Two cheetah cubs in Chester Zoo

There are breeding programs from Europe and the Middle East for the cheetah, such as the European Endangered Species Programme (EEP) which is reserved for European Association of Zoos and Aquaria (EAZA). The breeding programs have been successful. The captive breeding projects for the Northeast African cheetah first started in the Middle East, after several years of populations of cheetahs decreasing due to cubs being used for commercial purposes. Then European zoos started afterwards once the captive-born Northeast African cheetahs from the Arabian peninsula were sent to Zoological collections of Europe in Netherlands and Germany.

Cheetahs are known to be difficult to breed, especially in captivity. The Northeast African cheetah has been breeding in captivity for many years in Arabian zoos, such as Al Ain Zoo and Arabian wildlife centers from Qatar, Sharjah and Dubai. The cheetahs breeding in European zoos are found at Zoo Landau and Tierpark Berlin from Germany, the Chester Zoo, Bristol Zoo, Whipsnade Zoo and Marwell Zoo from the United Kingdom, Zoo de Cerza, Parc zoologique de Bordeaux Pessac and La Palmyre Zoo from France, the Plzeň Zoo from the Czech Republic, Zoo Santo Inácio from Portugal, the DierenPark Amersfoort and Beekse Bergen Safari Park from Netherlands. The Fota Wildlife Park from Ireland, which bred hundreds of South African cheetahs, has bred its first Northern cheetah in 2013.

The first captive breeding projects for the Northeast African cheetah started in Sheikh Butti Al-Maktoum's Wildlife Centre in early 1994, then followed by the Sharjah's Arabian Breeding Centre in late 2002 and Wadi Al Safa Wildlife Centre in 2003, until captive-bred Northeast African cheetahs from the Middle East were sent to two European zoos, Zoo Landau and Beekse Bergen Safari Park. La Palmyre Zoo would receive the cheetahs 6 months later as well.

=== Tamed cheetahs ===
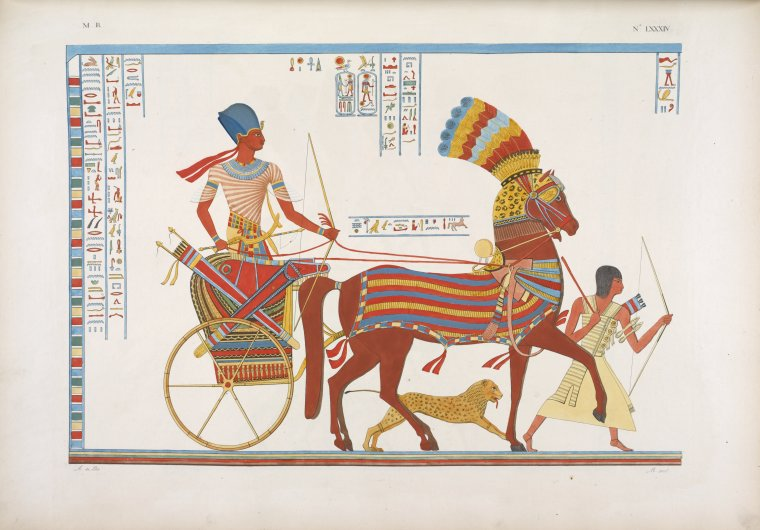
Egyptian chariot, accompanied by a cheetah and slave

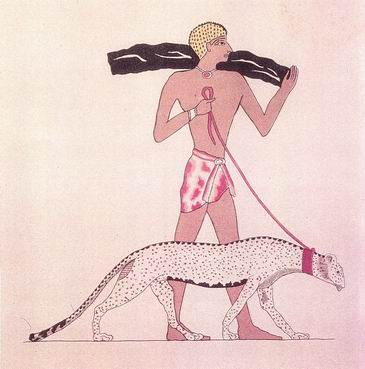
A tribesman bringing a cheetah and ebony as tribute to the King of Thebes (c. 1700 B.C.)

Both continents of Africa and Asia had 100,000 cheetahs in the 19th century. Cheetahs were once numerous in north, central and in the Horn of Africa. They ranged in Egypt and Libya in northern Africa, from Somalia to Niger in northeastern and central Africa. The Ancient Egyptians often kept tamed (not truly domesticated) cheetahs and raised them as pets, and also trained them for hunting alongside humans. Tamed cheetahs were taken to open hunting fields in low-sided carts or by horseback, hooded and blindfolded, and kept on leashes. When the prey was near enough, the cheetahs would be released to go after it.

This was the Egyptian tradition that was later passed on to the ancient Persians and brought to India, where the practice with Asiatic cheetahs was continued by Indian princes into the 12th century.

== See also ==
- Northwest African cheetah
- Southeast African cheetah
- Asiatic cheetah
- Big cat
