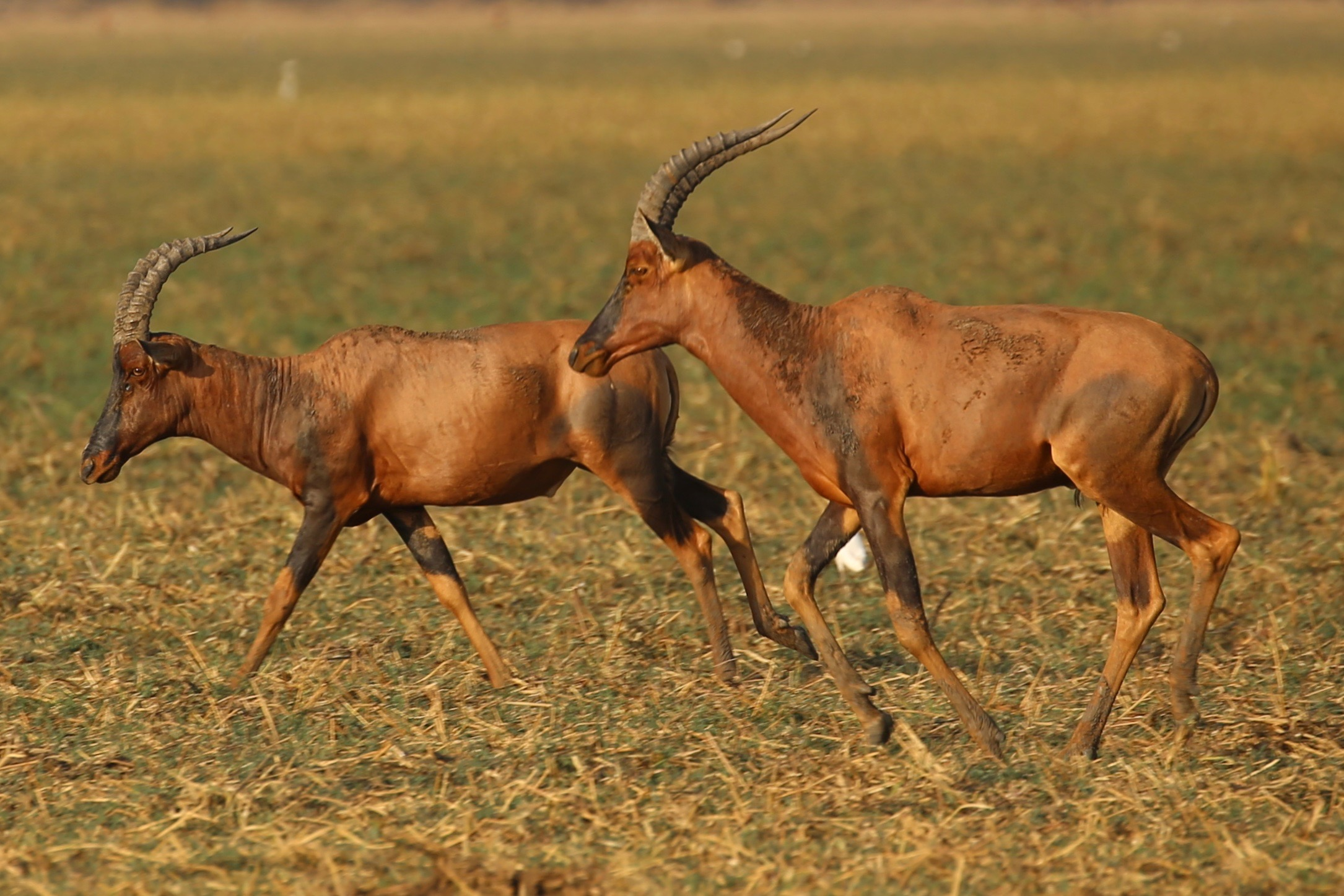
- In Zakouma National Park, Chad

Conservation status
- Least Concern (IUCN 3.1)

Scientific classification
- Kingdom: Animalia
- Phylum: Chordata
- Class: Mammalia
- Order: Artiodactyla
- Family: Bovidae
- Subfamily: Alcelaphinae
- Genus: Damaliscus
- Species: D. lunatus
- Subspecies: D. l. tiang

Trinomial name
- Damaliscus lunatus tiang (Heuglin, 1863)
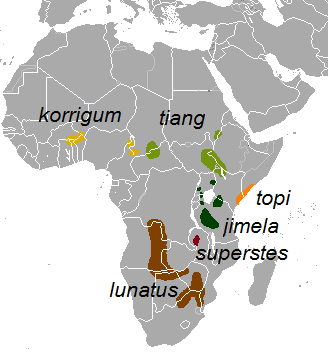
- Range in light green

= Tiang (antelope) =

Subspecies of mammal

The tiang (Damaliscus lunatus tiang) is a subspecies of the topi, an African antelope.

Depending on which topi populations are classified as tiang, they may be found in southern Chad, the northern Central African Republic, and southwestern South Sudan to southwestern Ethiopia, and extreme northwestern Kenya, or Uganda, South Sudan and Ethiopia.
