= List of protected areas of the Central African Republic =

The country of the Central African Republic in Africa has the following national parks and other protected areas.

== National parks ==
- André Félix National Park
- Bamingui-Bangoran National Park
- Dzanga-Ndoki National Park
- Mbaéré Bodingué National Park
- St Floris National Park

Around 32,300 km² total

== Faunal reserves ==
- Aouk Aoukale Faunal Reserve
- Nana Barya Faunal Reserve
- Ouandjia Vakaga Faunal Reserve
- Yata Ngaya Faunal Reserve
- Zemongo Faunal Reserve

== Nature reserves ==
- Vassako Bolo Strict Nature Reserve
- Chinko Nature Reserve

== Other reserves ==
- Dzanga-Sangha Special Reserve

== See also ==
- Tourism in the Central African Republic
