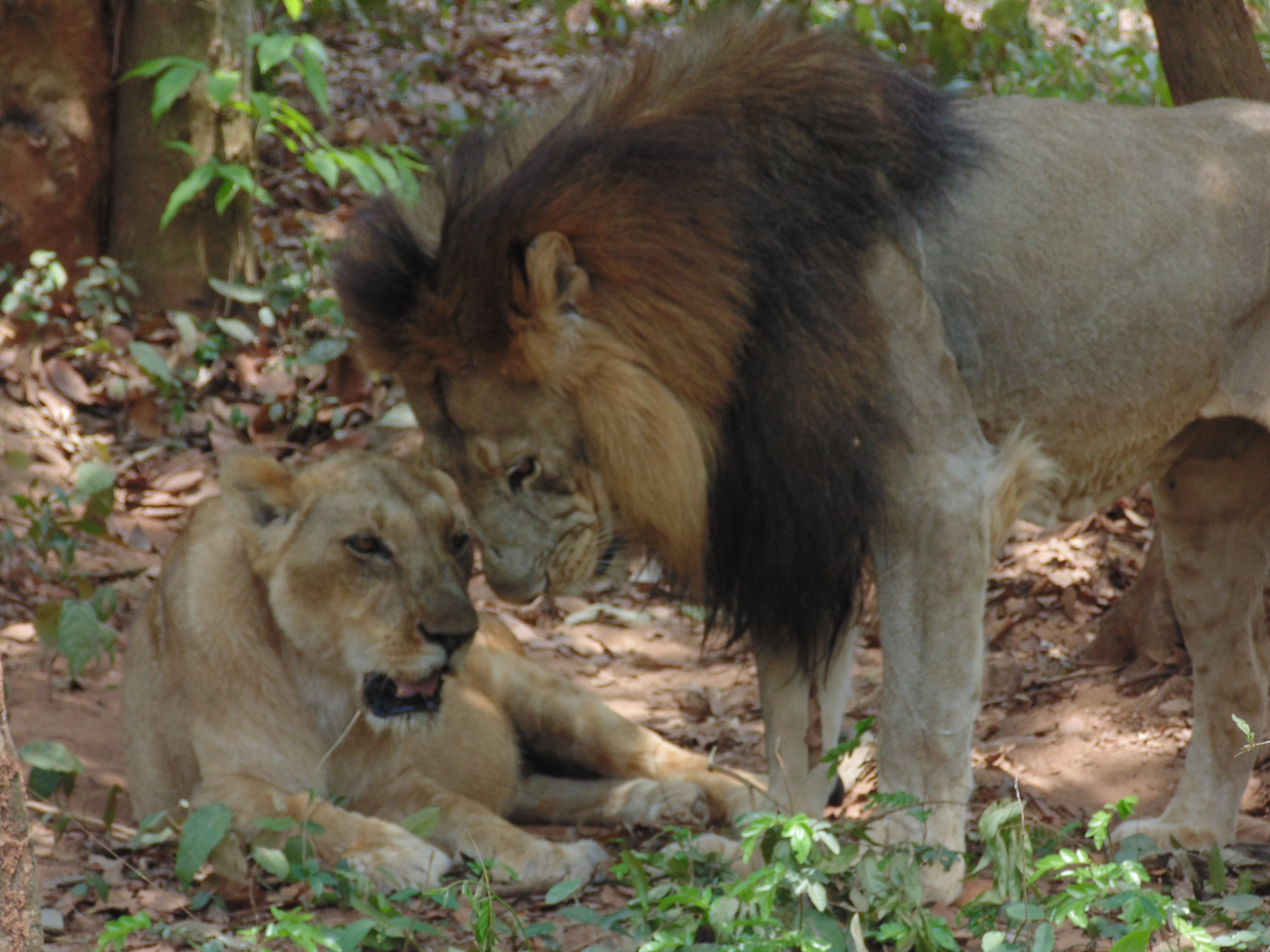
- Asiatic lions in Gir Forest National Park

Conservation status
- Endangered (IUCN 3.1)

Scientific classification
- Kingdom: Animalia
- Phylum: Chordata
- Class: Mammalia
- Order: Carnivora
- Family: Felidae
- Genus: Panthera
- Species: P. leo
- Subspecies: P. l. leo

Trinomial name
- Panthera leo leo (Linnaeus, 1758)

Synonyms
- P. l. gambianus; P. l. persica; P. l. senegalensis; P. l. nubicus; P. l. kamptzi; P. l. azandica

= Panthera leo leo =

Lion subspecies

Panthera leo leo is a lion subspecies present in West Africa, northern Central Africa and India. In West and Central Africa it is restricted to fragmented and isolated populations with a declining trajectory. It has been referred to as the northern lion.

Results of a phylogeographic study indicate that lion populations in West and Central African range countries are genetically close to populations in India, forming a major clade distinct from lion populations in Southern and East Africa. In 2017, the Cat Classification Task Force of the IUCN Cat Specialist Group subsumed lion populations according to the major clades into two subspecies, namely P. l. leo and P. l. melanochaita. Within P. l. leo three subclades are clearly distinguishable. One from Asia, which includes the extinct Barbary lions of North Africa, another one from West Africa and a third one from Central Africa, north of the rainforest belt.

P. l. leo is regionally extinct in North Africa, southern Europe, and West Asia. Asia's sole lion population lives in and around Gir National Park, India. The West African lion population is geographically isolated and numbers fewer than 250 mature individuals. It is listed as critically endangered on the IUCN Red List.

== Taxonomy ==
A lion from Constantine, Algeria, was the type specimen for the specific name Felis leo used by Carl Linnaeus in 1758. In the 19th and 20th centuries, several lion zoological specimens from Africa and Asia were described and proposed as subspecies:

- Felis leo persicus described in 1826 by Johann N. Meyer was a lion skin from Persia.
- Felis leo senegalensis also described by Meyer in 1826, but based on a lion skin from Senegal.
- Felis leo nubicus described in 1843 by Henri Marie Ducrotay de Blainville was a male lion from Nubia that had been sent by Antoine Clot from Cairo to Paris and died in the Ménagerie du Jardin des Plantes in 1841.
- Leo gambianus described in 1843 by John Edward Gray was a specimen from the Gambia in the collection of the British Museum of Natural History.
- Felis leo kamptzi described in 1900 by Paul Matschie was a lion skull from northern Cameroon.
- Leo leo azandicus described in 1924 by Joel Asaph Allen was a male lion that was killed in 1912 in northeastern Belgian Congo as part of a zoological collection comprising 588 carnivore specimens. Allen admitted a close relationship of this lion specimen to Leo leo massaicus from Kenya regarding cranial and dental characteristics, but argued that his type specimen differed in pelage colouration.

In 1930, Reginald Innes Pocock subordinated the lion to the genus Panthera when he wrote about Asiatic lion specimens in the zoological collection of the British Museum of Natural History.

In the following decades, there has been much debate among zoologists on the validity of proposed subspecies:

- In 1939, Glover Morrill Allen recognized Felis leo kamptzi and F. l. azandicus as valid taxa among ten lion subspecies.
- Three decades later, John Ellerman and Terence Morrison-Scott recognized only two lion subspecies in the Palearctic realm, namely the African (P. l. leo) and Asiatic lions (P. l. persica).
- Some authors considered P. l. nubicus a valid subspecies and synonymous with P. l. massaica, a specimen from Kenya.
- Some authors considered P. l. azandicus synonymous with P. l. massaicus and P. l. somaliensis, and P. l. kamptzi synonymous with P. l. senegalensis.
- In 2005, Wallace Christopher Wozencraft recognized P. l. kamptzi, P. l. bleyenberghi and P. l. azandica as valid taxa.
- In 2016, IUCN Red List assessors used P. l. leo for all African lion populations.

In 2017, the Cat Classification Task Force of the IUCN Cat Specialist Group subsumed lion populations in North, West and Central Africa and Asia to P. l. leo, based on results of genetic research on lion samples.

=== Phylogeny ===
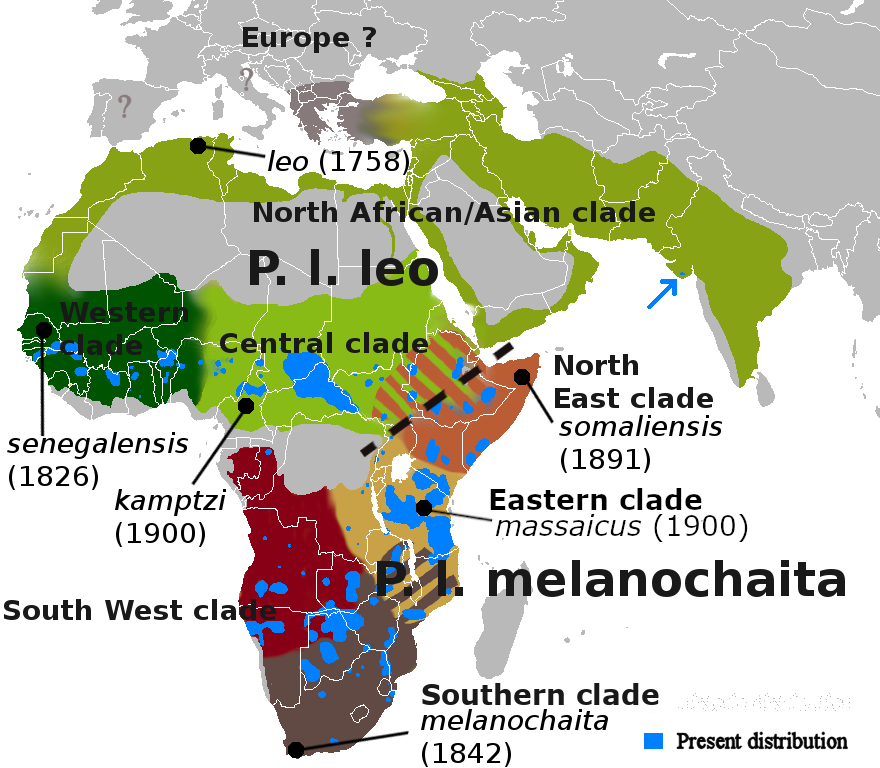
Range map including proposed clades and the two subspecies (P. l. leo and P. l. melanochaita) according to genetic research

Since the beginning of the 21st century, several phylogenetic studies were conducted to aid clarifying the taxonomic status of lion samples kept in museums and collected in the wild. Scientists analysed between 32 and 480 lion samples from up to 22 countries. They all agree that the lion comprises two evolutionary groups, one in the northern and eastern parts of its historical range, and the other in Southern and East Africa; they are estimated to have genetically diverged between 245,000 and 50,000 years ago. Tropical rainforest and the East African Rift possibly constituted major barriers between the two groups.

The two lion groups overlap in Ethiopia, as lion samples from Bale Mountains National Park clustered with lion samples from Central Africa, whereas other samples from this country clustered with samples from East Africa. Three clades can be distinguished within P. l. leo. Lion samples from North Africa and India clustered into a single clade, and the lions in West Africa and northern parts of Central Africa also form distinct clades. Analysis of phylogenetic data of 194 lion samples from 22 countries revealed that Central and West African lions diverged about 186,000–128,000 years ago from the melanochaita group in East and Southern Africa.

Samples from West Africa shared alleles with samples from Southern Africa, and samples from Central Africa shared alleles with samples from Asia. This indicates that Central Africa was a melting pot of lion populations after they had become isolated. They possibly migrated through corridors in the Nile Basin during the early Holocene. Genome-wide data of a historical lion sample from Sudan showed that it clustered with P. l. leo in mitochondrial DNA-based phylogenies, but with a high affinity with P. l. melanochaita. The taxonomic position of lions in Central Africa may therefore require revision.

== Characteristics ==
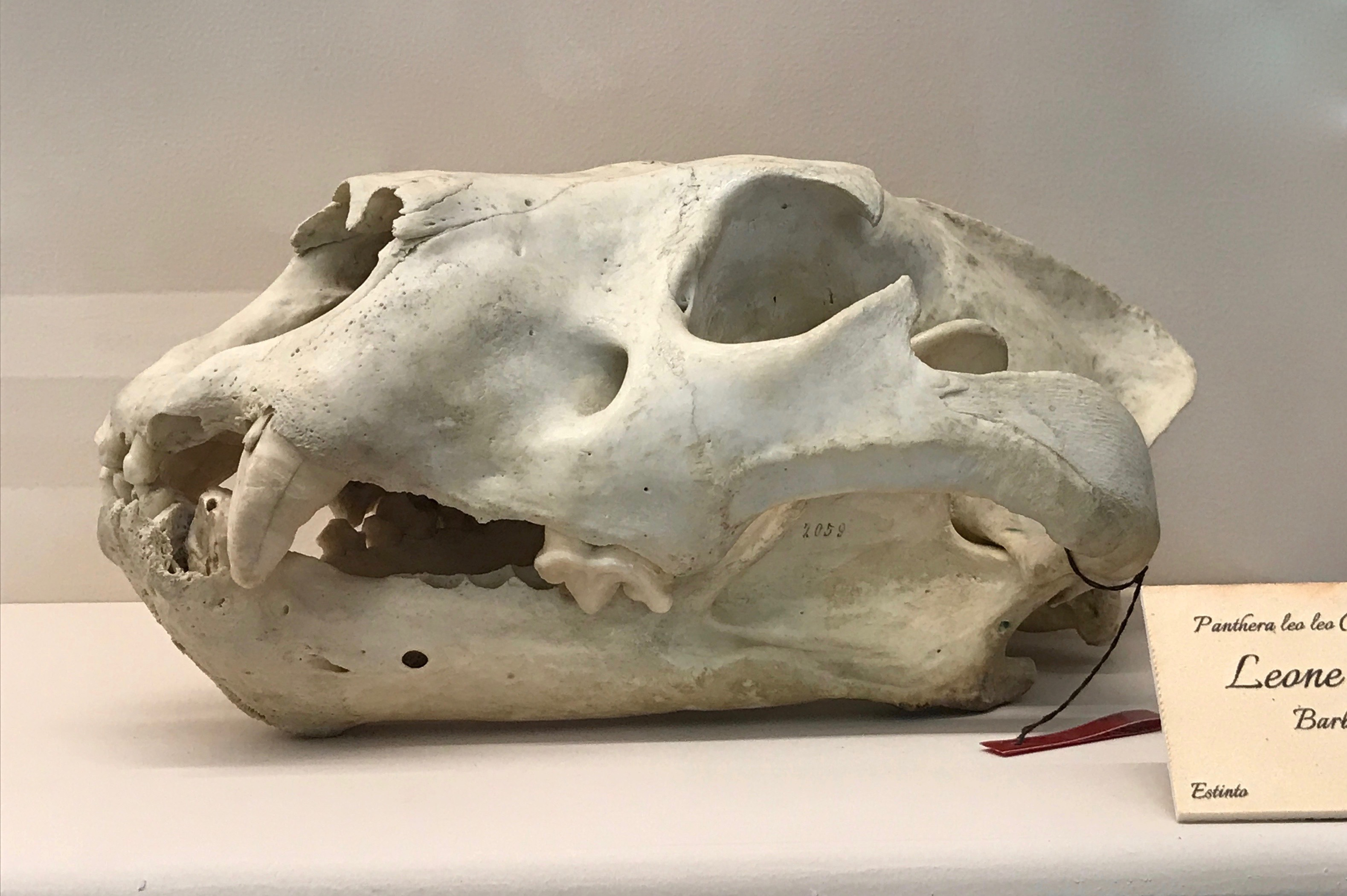
A skull of P. leo leo in the Natural History Museum of the University of Pisa

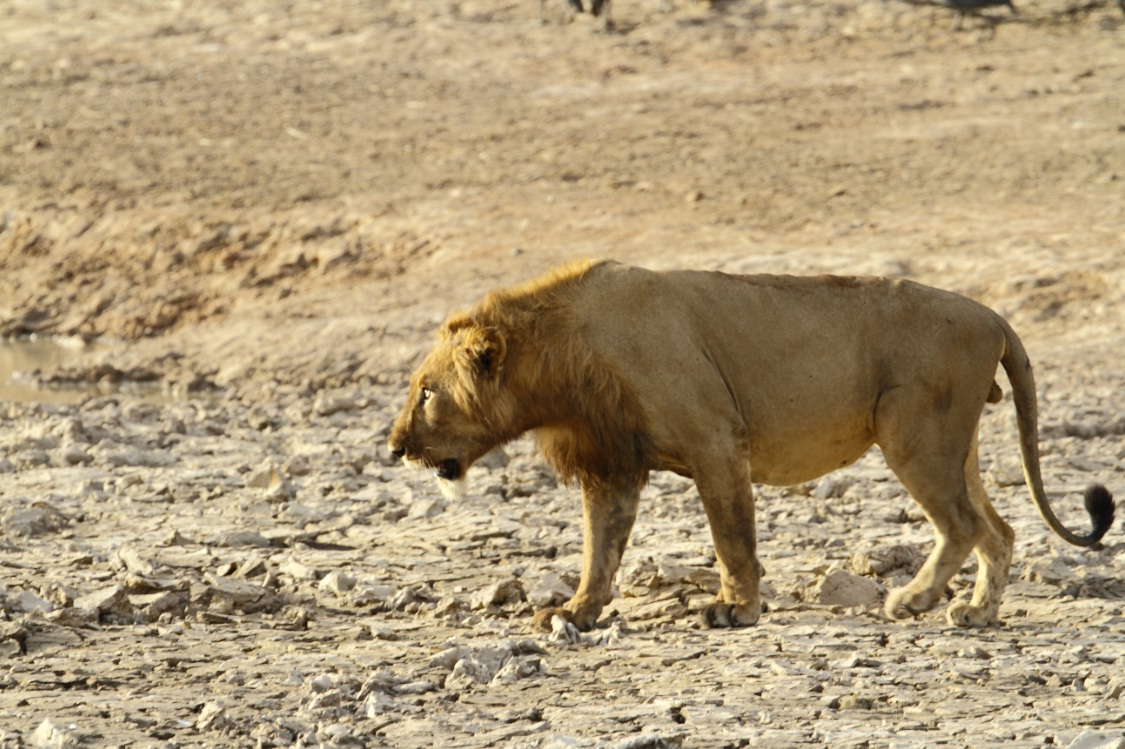
Maneless lion in Pendjari National Park

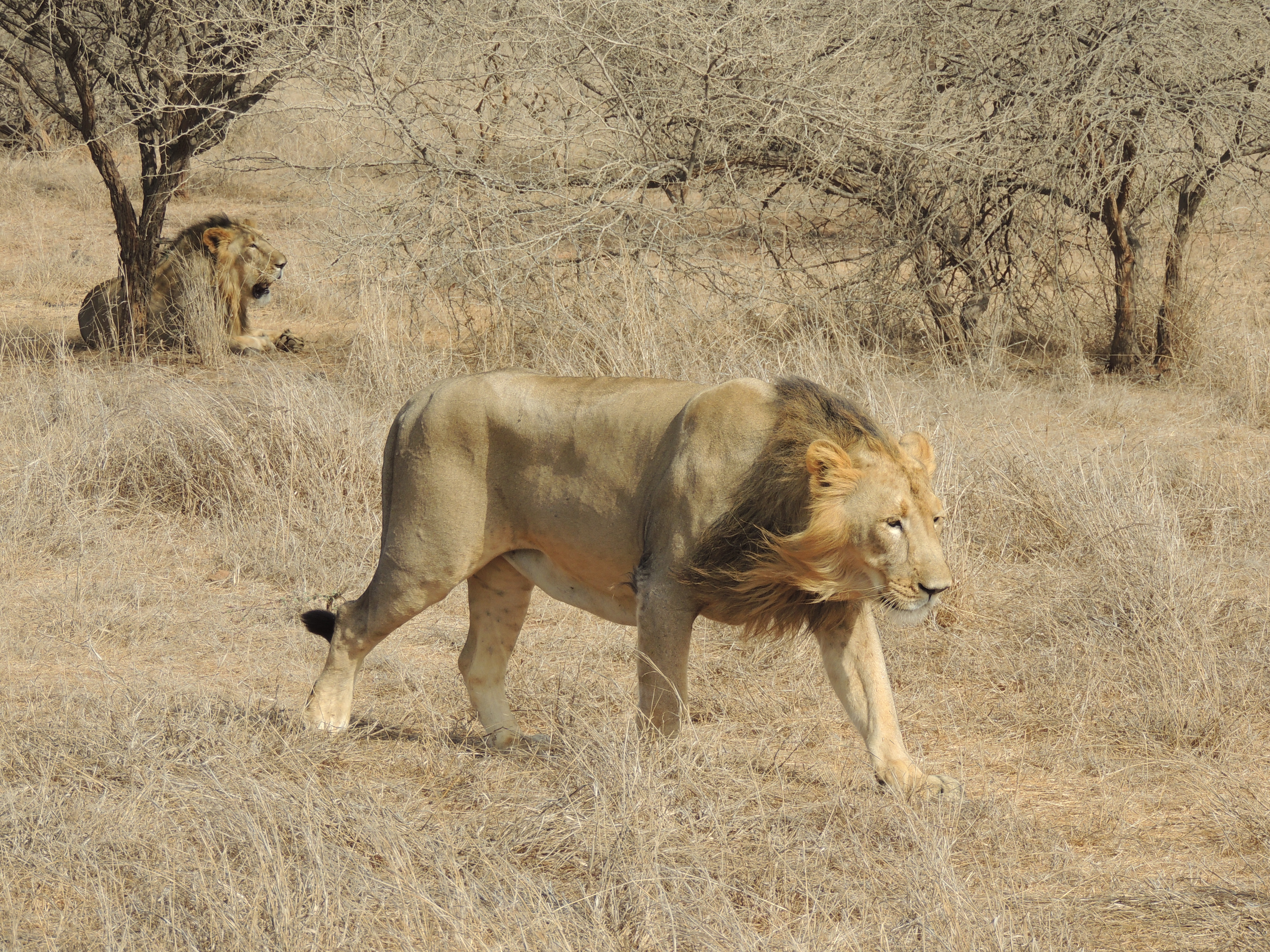
Asiatic lion in Gir National Park, India

The lion's fur varies in colour from light buff to dark brown. It has rounded ears and a black tail tuft. Average head-to-body length of male lions is 2.47–2.84 m (8 ft 1 in – 9 ft 4 in) with a weight of 148.2–190.9 kg (327–421 lb). Females are smaller and less heavy. Zoological lion specimens range in colour from light to dark tawny. Male skins have short manes, light manes, dark manes or long manes. Taxonomists recognised that neither skin nor mane colour and length of lions can be adduced as distinct subspecific characteristics. Then they turned to measuring and comparing lion skulls and found that skull length of Barbary and Indian lion samples does not differ significantly, ranging from 28–31.17 cm (11.02–12.27 in) in females and 33.8–36.2 cm (13.3–14.3 in) in males. A few lion specimens from West Africa obtained by museums were described as having shorter manes than lions from other African regions. In general, the West African lion is similar in general appearance and size as lions in other parts of Africa and Asia. Skeletal muscles make up 58.8% of the lion's body weight.

== Distribution and habitat ==
Today, P. l. leo occurs in West and Central Africa and India. It is regionally extinct in The Gambia, Mauritania, Sierra Leone, the Western Sahara, Morocco, Algeria, Tunisia, Libya, Egypt, Saudi Arabia, Kuwait, Jordan, Lebanon, Syria, Turkey, Palestine, Israel, Iraq, Iran and Pakistan. During the Holocene, Asiatic lions colonised southeast Europe and adjacent areas of the continent, spanning from Hungary to Greece to Ukraine, but became extinct likely in classical times. In 2005, a Lion Conservation Strategy was developed for West and Central Africa. Contemporary lion distribution and habitat quality in savannahs of West and Central Africa was assessed in 2005, and Lion Conservation Units (LCU) mapped. Educated guesses for size of populations in these LCUs ranged from 3,274 to 3,909 individuals between 2002 and 2012.

=== West African clade ===
Habitat in:

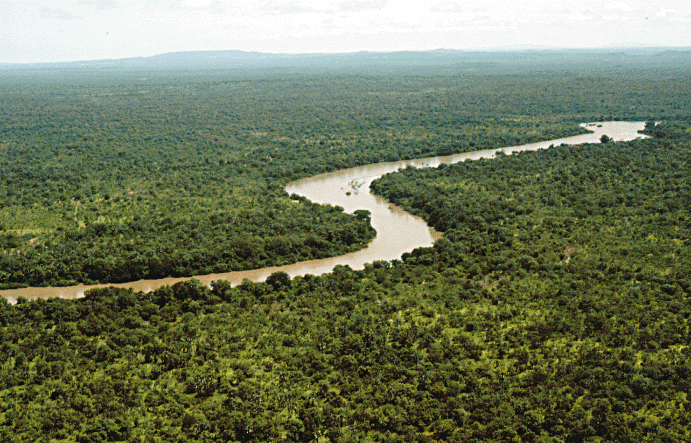
Niokolo-Koba National Park

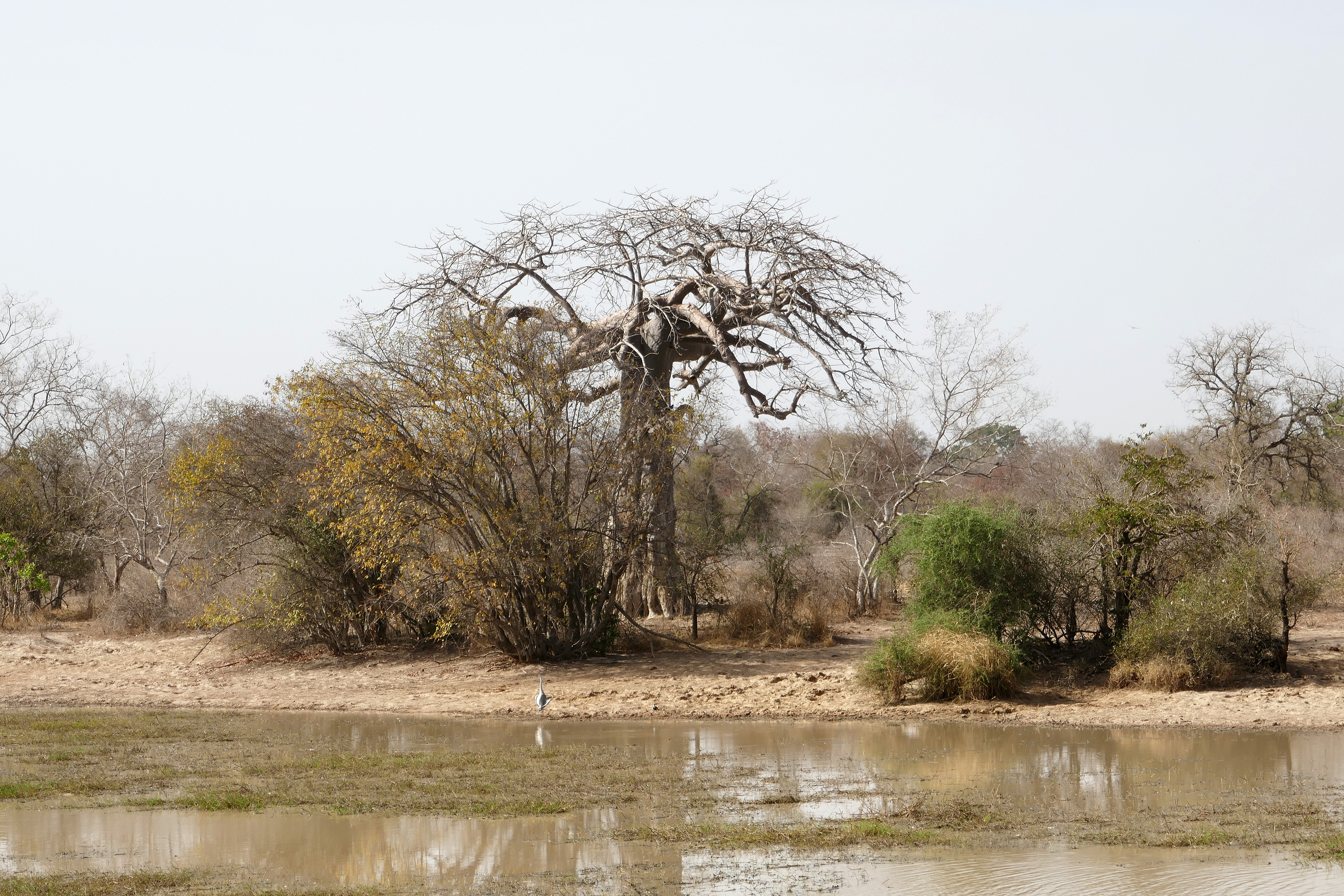
Pendjari National Park

The last populations of the West African lion clade are surviving in a few protected areas from Senegal in the west to Nigeria in the east. This population has lost 99% of its former range. Between 246 and 466 lions live in the WAP-Complex, a large system of protected areas formed mainly by W, Arli, and Pendjari National Parks in Burkina Faso, Benin, and Niger. It is regionally extinct in Mauritania, Gambia, Guinea-Bissau, Mali, Sierra Leone, Ivory Coast, and Togo, and possibly extinct in Guinea and Ghana. The border between the West African and the Central African lion clade is following largely the lower Niger River, which seems to act as a permanent barrier for gene flow.

Range countries	Lion Conservation Units	Area in km^{2}
Senegal, Mali, Guinea-Bissau, Guinea	Niokolo-Koba National Park	90,384
Guinea	National Park of Upper Niger	613
Benin, Burkina Faso, Niger	W-Arly-Pendjari Complex	29,403
Benin	three unprotected areas	6,833
Nigeria	Kainji National Park	5,340

=== Central African clade ===
Habitat in:

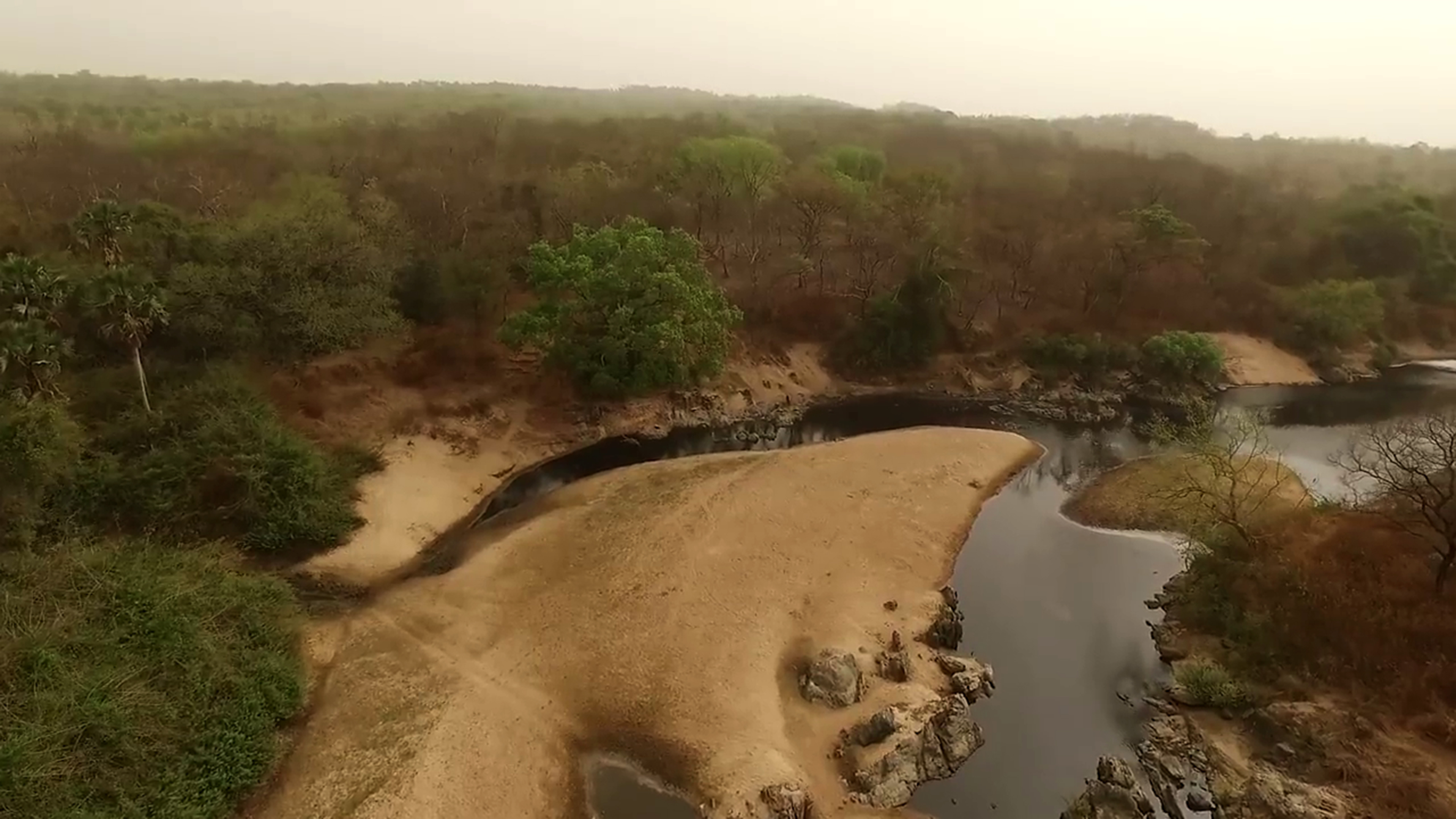
Bénoué National Park

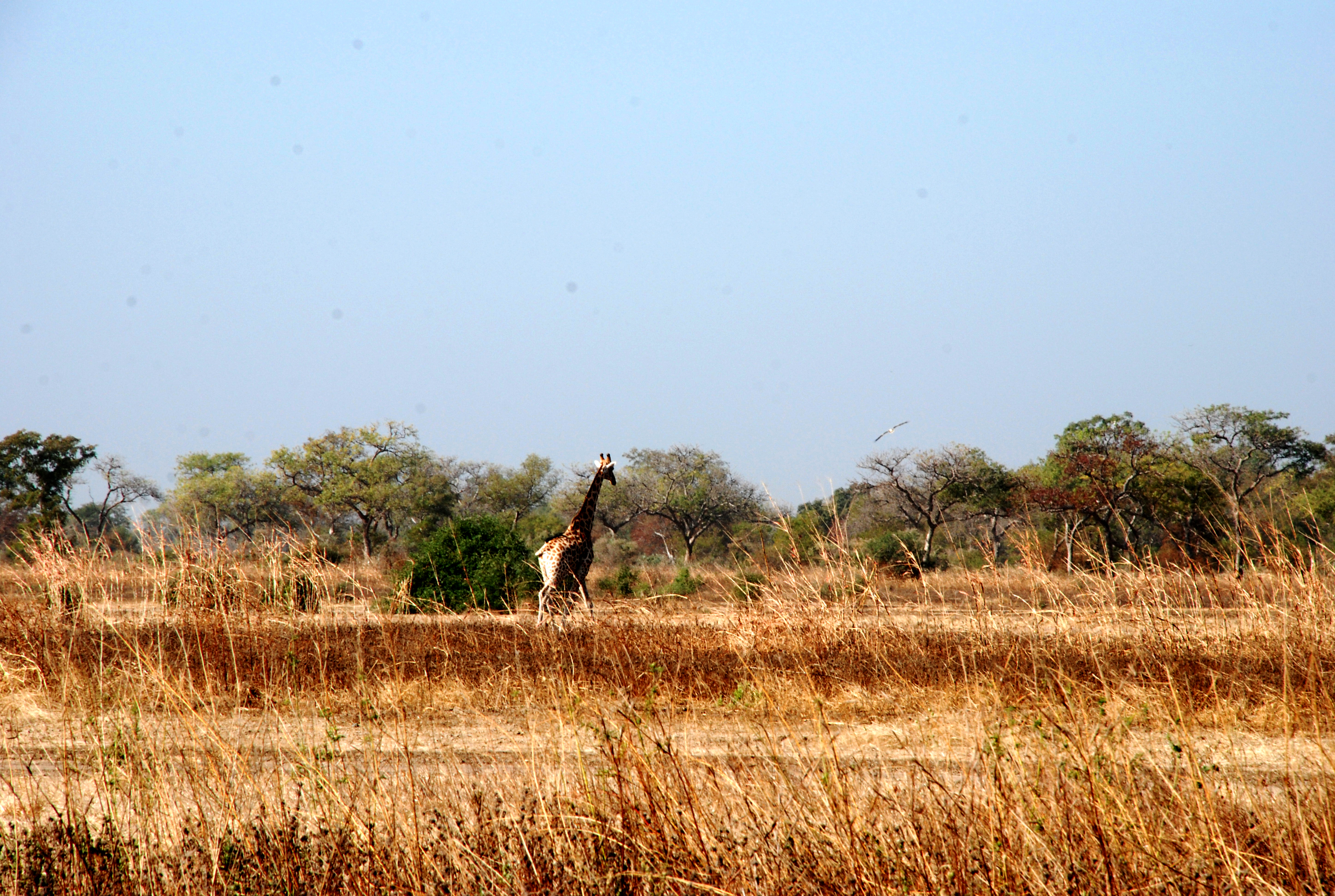
Waza National Park

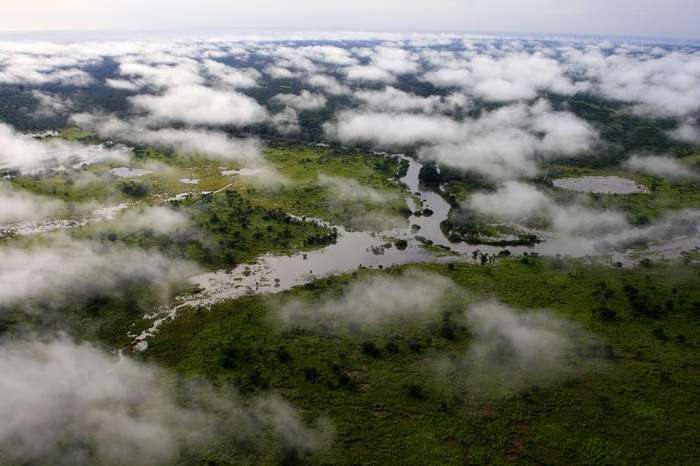
Garamba National Park

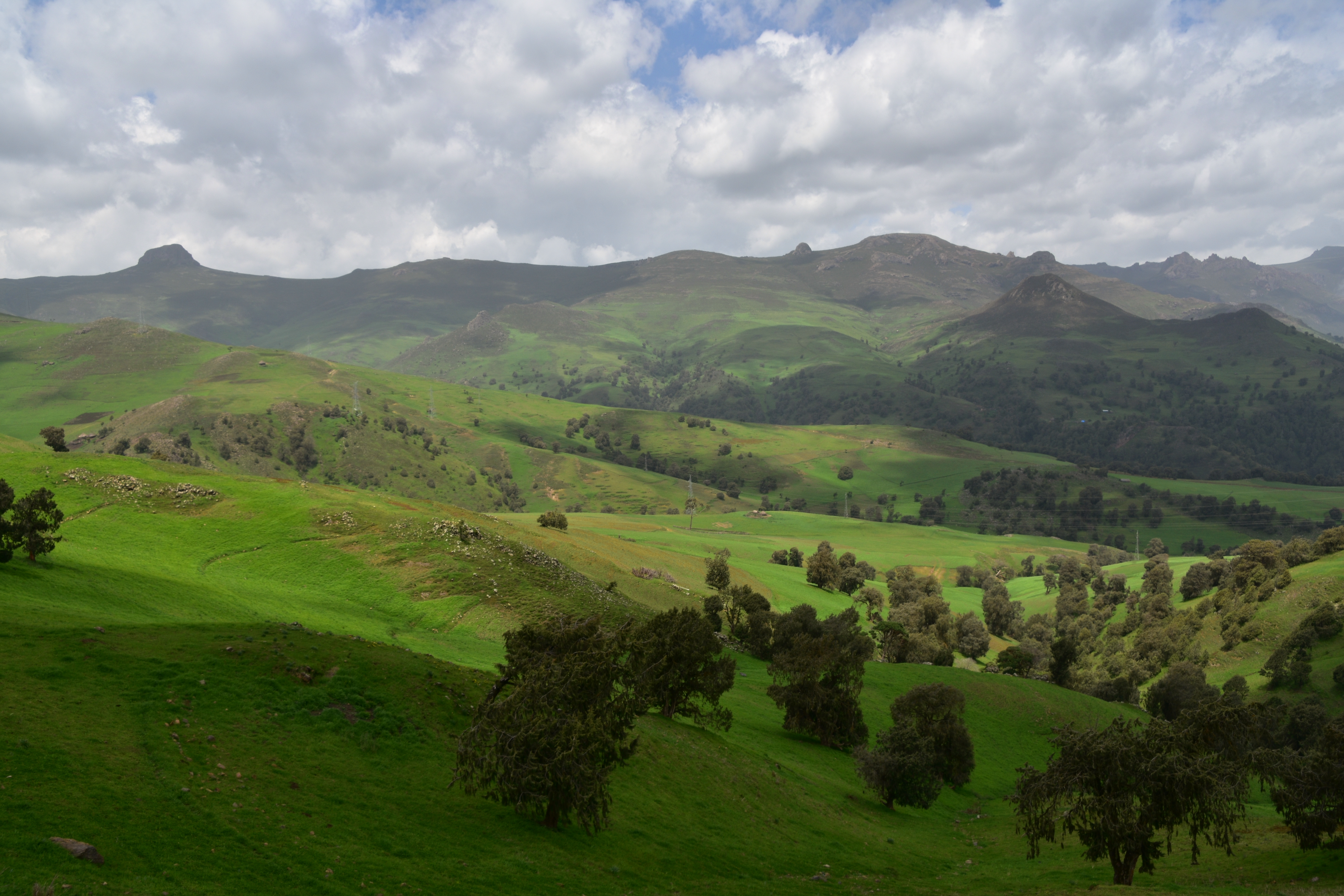
Bale Mountains

The Central African lion population inhabits protected areas of:

- Cameroon, where lions are present in Bénoué National Park. In the North Province, Cameroon, lions were recorded during a survey between January 2008 and May 2010. The small lion population in Waza National Park is isolated, and by 2008 had declined to maximum 20 individuals. In the southern part of the country, 2 lions were discovered in Mpem and Djim National Park in April 2019.
- Central African Republic, where lions are present in Bamingui-Bangoran National Park and Biosphere Reserve, Manovo-Gounda St. Floris and Awakaba National Parks, Aouk Aoukale, Yata Ngaya, Nana Barya and Zemongo Faunal Reserves, and in several hunting reserves of the country. Estimated lion numbers in the country are generally thought to be unreliable.
- Chad, where lions inhabit Siniaka-Minia Faunal Reserve and Zakouma and Aouk National Parks, but have been extirpated in Manda National Park. Lions may still be present in pastoral rangelands and mountain ranges outside protected areas. In 2004, the lion population in the country was estimated at maximum of 225 individuals.
- northern parts of the Democratic Republic of the Congo, where lions permanently inhabit rainforests and clearings in rainforest mixed with savannah grassland.
- Sudan's Southern Darfur province, where lions were abundant in the 1950s; some caused damage to livestock and were poisoned; 76 lions were shot between 1947 and 1952. Lions were recorded in the Dinder–Alatash protected area complex during surveys between 2015 and 2018.
- South Sudan, where little is known about lion distribution and population sizes. Lions in Radom and Southern National Parks are probably connected to lions in the Central African Republic.
- Ethiopia has lions from the Northern as well as from the Southern lion subspecies and is considered an admixture zone. While lions from Gambella National Park belong to the Northern subspecies (P. l. leo), lions from other parts of the country belong to the Southern lion.

Range countries	Lion Conservation Units	Area in km^{2}
Nigeria	Yankari National Park	2,250
Cameroon	Waza and Bénoué National Parks	16,134
Central African Republic	eastern part of the country; Bozoum and Nana Barya Faunal Reserves	339,481
Chad	southeastern part	133,408
Democratic Republic of Congo	Garamba-Bili Uere	115,671
Sudan, South Sudan		331,834
South Sudan, Ethiopia	Boma-Gambella	106,941

=== Asian/North African clade ===
The Asiatic lion is the last surviving population of this clade. Once also found in the Middle East, it is nowadays confined in the wild to Gujarat in India. Genetically, the extinct lions from Northern Africa, formally termed as Barbary lions, fall into the same clade as the Asiatic lion. Therefore, the range of this lion clade encompassed historically North Africa, southeastern Europe, the Arabian Peninsula, the Middle East and the Indian subcontinent. In these regions, lions occurred in:

- the Sahel, mountain ranges of the Sahara, Barbary Coast and Maghreb,
- the eastern Mediterranean Basin and the Black Sea region,
- reed swamps of Mesopotamia, wooded steppe vegetation and pistachio-almond woodlands in Iran,
- the northwestern part of the Indian subcontinent up to Rajasthan and Bengal in North India.

The Barbary lion population in North Africa is extinct since the mid-1960s. The Asiatic lion population survives in Gir Forest National Park and remnant forest habitats in the two hill systems of Gir and Girnar that comprise Gujarat's largest tracts of dry deciduous forest, thorny forest and savanna. It is listed as Endangered on the IUCN Red List because of its small size and area of occupancy.

== Behaviour and ecology ==
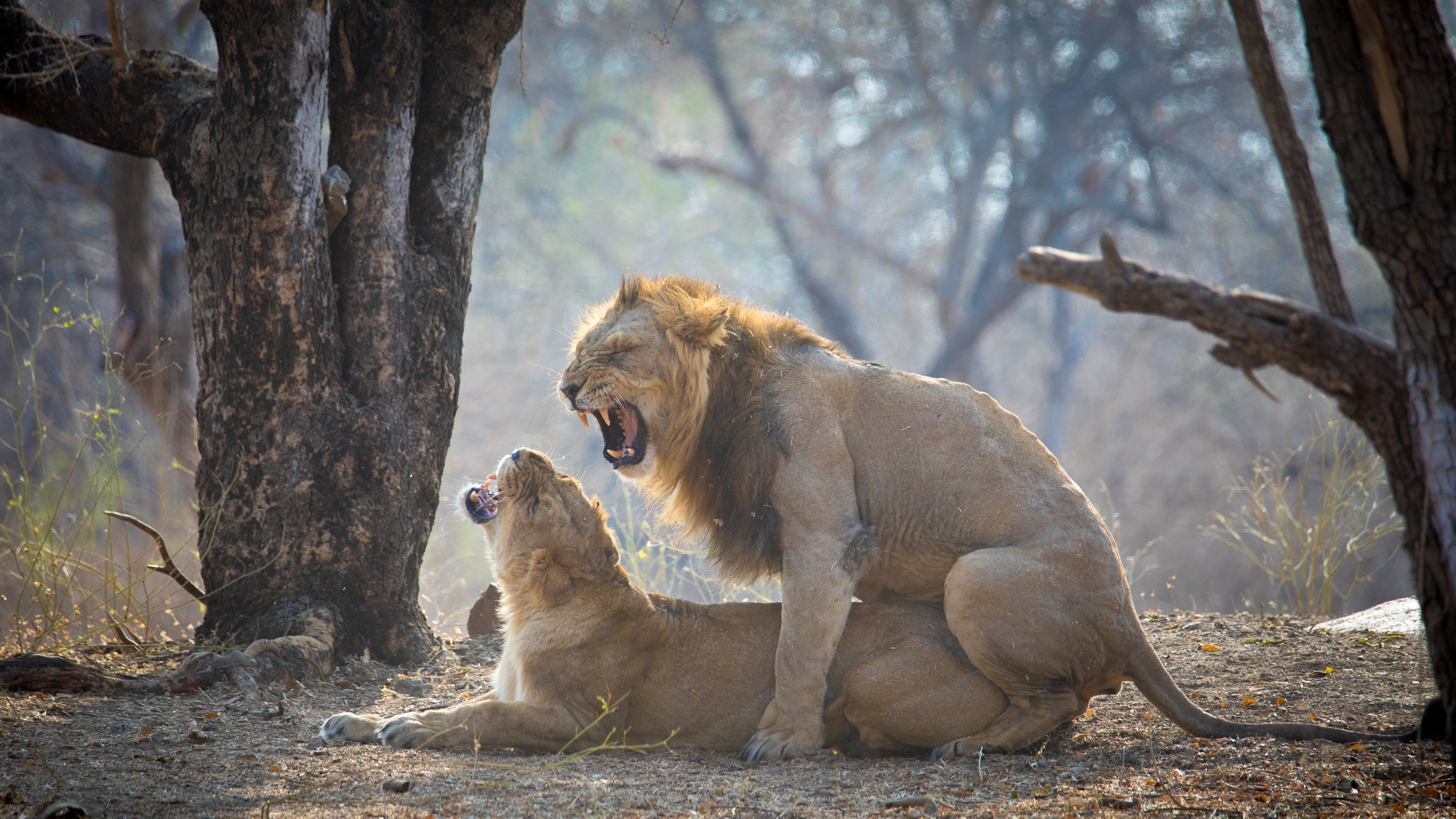
Asiatic lions mating in Gir Forest

Male Asiatic lions are solitary or associate with up to three males forming a loose pride. Pairs of males rest, hunt and feed together, and display marking behaviour at the same sites. Females associate with up to 12 females forming a stronger pride together with their cubs. They share large carcasses among each other, but seldom with males. Female and male lions usually associate only for a few days when mating, but rarely travel and feed together.

In Pendjari National Park, groups of lions range from 1–8 individuals. Outside the National Park, groups are smaller and with a single male. In Waza National Park, three female and two male lions were radio-collared in 1999 and tracked until 2001. The females moved in home ranges of between 352 and 724 km^{2} (136 and 280 sq mi) and stayed inside the park during most of the survey period. The males used home ranges of between 428 and 1,054 km^{2} (165 and 407 sq mi), both inside and outside the park, where they repeatedly killed livestock. One was killed and the other shot at by local people. After the pellets were removed, he recovered and shifted his home range to inside the park, and was not observed killing livestock any more.

=== Hunting and diet ===
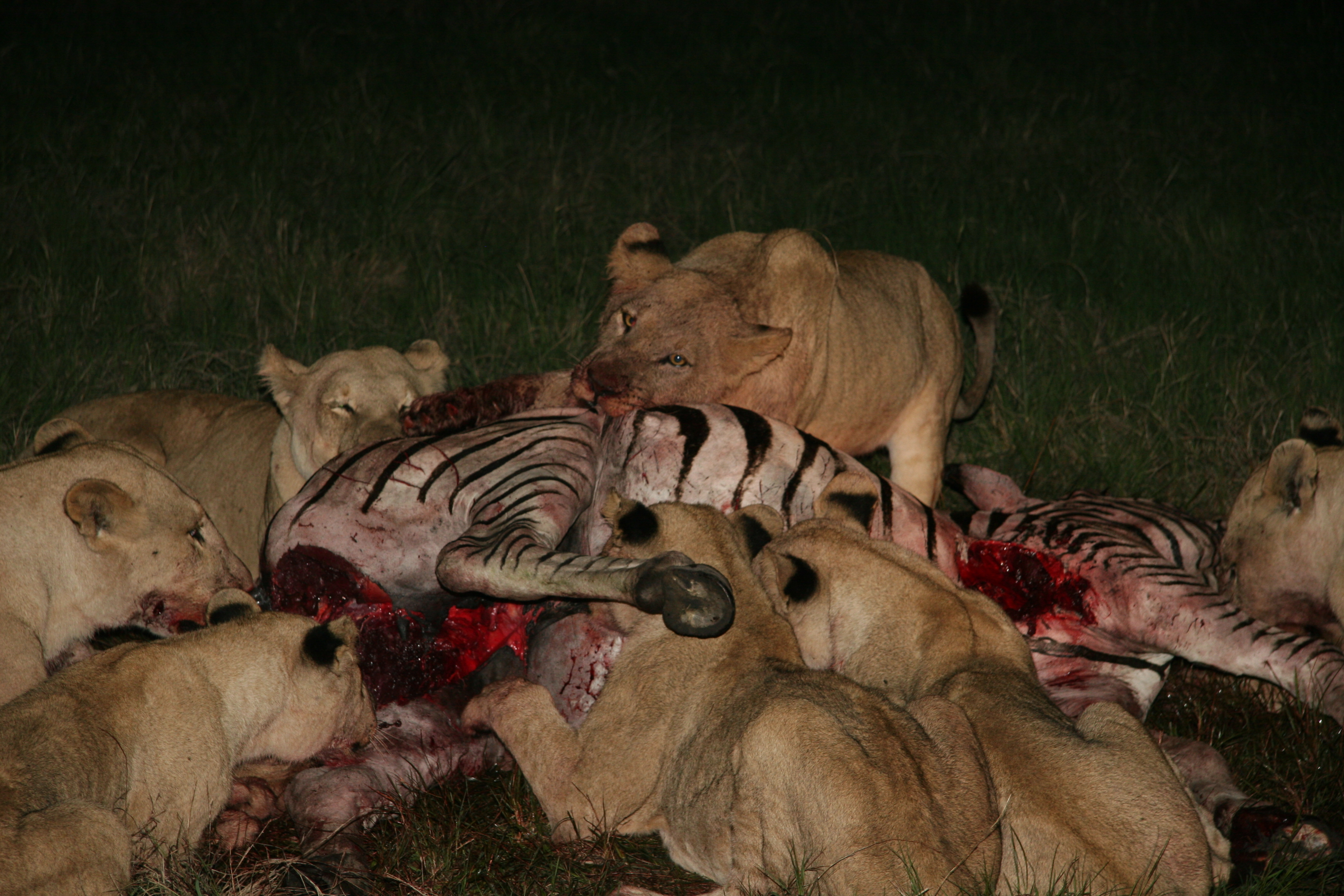
Lions feeding on a zebra

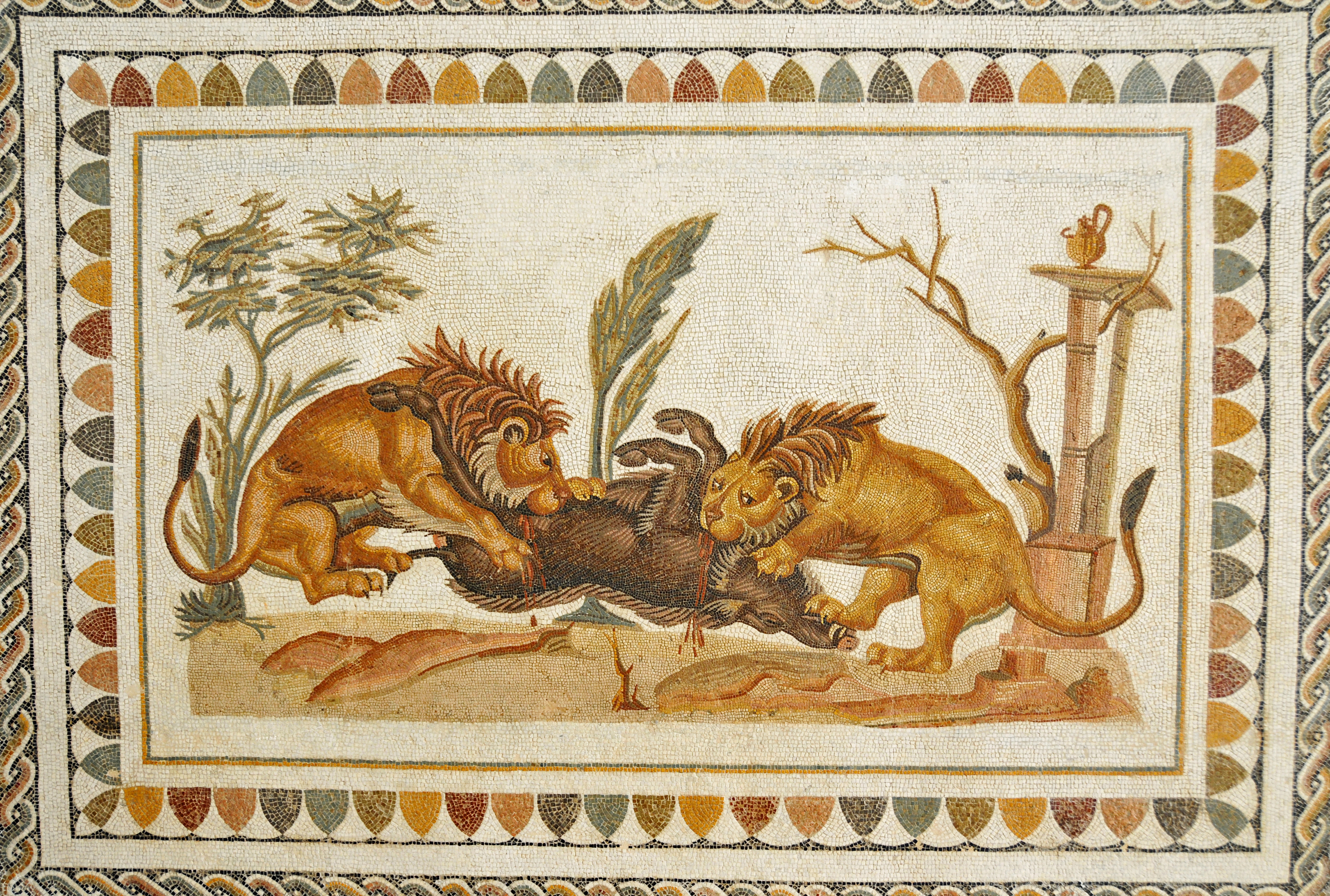
Roman mosaic from Tunisia showing lions attacking a wild boar

In general, lions prefer large prey species within a weight range of 190–550 kg (420–1,210 lb). They hunt large ungulates in the range of 40–270 kg (88–595 lb) including gemsbok (Oryx gazella), Cape buffalo (Syncerus caffer), blue wildebeest (Connochaetes taurinus), giraffe (Giraffa camelopardalis), common eland (Tragelaphus oryx), greater kudu (T. strepsiceros), nyala (T. angasii), roan antelope (Hippotragus equinus), sable antelope (H. niger), zebra (Equus quagga), bushpig (Potamochoerus larvatus), common warthog (Phacochoerus africanus), hartebeest (Alcephalus buselaphus), common tsessebe (Damaliscus lunatus), Thomson's gazelle (Eudorcas thomsonii), waterbuck (Kobus ellipsiprymnus) and kob (K. kob). Analysis of 119 faecal samples of lions collected in Cameroon's Faro National Park revealed that lions preyed foremost on kob and harnessed bushbuck (Tragelaphus scriptus), and to a lesser extent also on waterbuck, crested porcupine (Hystrix cristata), bushpig, roan antelope, olive baboon (Papio anubis) and oribi (Ourebia ourebi). In India's Gir Forest National Park, lions predominantly kill chital (Axis axis), Sambar deer (Rusa unicolor), nilgai (Boselaphus tragocamelus), cattle (Bos taurus), domestic buffalo (Bubalus bubalis) and less frequently also wild boar (Sus scrofa). Outside the protected area where wild prey species do not occur, lions prey on buffalo and cattle, rarely also on Arabian camel (Camelus dromedarius). They kill most prey less than 100 m (330 ft) away from water bodies, charge prey from close range and drag carcasses into dense cover.

Lions probably prey on livestock when wild prey species occur at lower densities, especially during the wet season. An interview survey among livestock owners in six villages in Waza National Park's vicinity revealed that lions attack cattle mostly during the rainy season when wild prey disperses away from artificial waterholes.

== Threats ==
In Africa, lions are killed pre-emptively or in retaliation for preying on livestock. Populations are also threatened by depletion of prey base, loss and conversion of habitat.

The lion population in West Africa is fragmented and isolated, comprising fewer than 250 mature individuals. It is threatened by poaching and illegal trade of body parts. Lion body parts from Benin are smuggled to Niger, Nigeria, Gabon, Ivory Coast, Senegal and Guinea, and from Burkina Faso to Benin, Ivory Coast, Senegal and Guinea. In Nigeria, the isolated lion population in Gashaka Gumti National Park is hunted and poisoned by local people.

The lion population in Central Africa is threatened by loss of habitat and prey base and trophy hunting. Between seven and 12 lion trophies were exported from Cameroon every year between 1985 and 2010. In Bénoué National Park, local people were observed at a lion kill cutting off chunks of meat. Local people living in the vicinity of the protected area accounted in interviews that lions frequently attack livestock during the dry season. They use poison on carcasses to kill carnivores. In Waza National Park, two of four radio-collared lions were killed between 2007 and 2008, and probably also an adult female, two other adult males and three cubs. Nomadic herders use bow and arrows poisoned with cobra venom to kill lions in retaliation for attacks on livestock. In northern parts of Cameroon, increased migration of people from Nigeria following the political insecurity in the region posed a threat to the area's lion population.

Poaching of lions by paramilitary forces has been reported by local people living in the vicinity of Ethiopia's Gambella National Park. Local people around Chebera Churchura National Park kill lions, leopards (Panthera pardus) and spotted hyenas (Crocuta crocuta) using traps to retaliate against attacks on their livestock.

Surveys in the Central African Republic's Chinko area revealed that the number of lions decreased significantly between 2012 and 2017 after transhumant pastoralists from the border area with Sudan moved into the area. Rangers found multiple lion cadavers and confiscated large amounts of poison in the camps of livestock herders. They were accompanied by armed merchants who also engaged in poaching large herbivores, sale of bushmeat and trading lion skins.

== Conservation ==
In India, the lion is protected, and included in CITES Appendix I. African lions are included in CITES Appendix II. In 2004, it was proposed in 2004 to list all lion populations in CITES Appendix I to reduce exports of lion trophies and implement a stricter permission process, due to the negative impact of trophy hunting.

In 2006, a Lion Conservation Strategy for West and Central Africa was developed in cooperation between IUCN regional offices and several wildlife conservation organisations. The strategy envisages to maintain sufficient habitat, ensure a sufficient wild prey base, make lion-human coexistence sustainable and reduce factors that lead to further fragmentation of populations. Surveys and interviews with herders around protected areas revealed that improved enclosures for livestock significantly decreased depredation by lions, and hence contributed to mitigating human-lion conflict.

The effect of lion trophy hunting and whether it is a sustainable conservation measure, has been discussed controversially. In 2016, a group of authors recommended a quota for lion trophy hunting of one lion per 1,000 km^{2} (390 sq mi) in the WAP protected area complex, and to refrain from imposing an import embargo of lion trophies from this region. This recommendation was questioned and strongly opposed, with the argument that the estimate for lion population size in the WAP region is not reliable and therefore the suggested quota inappropriate.

=== In captivity ===
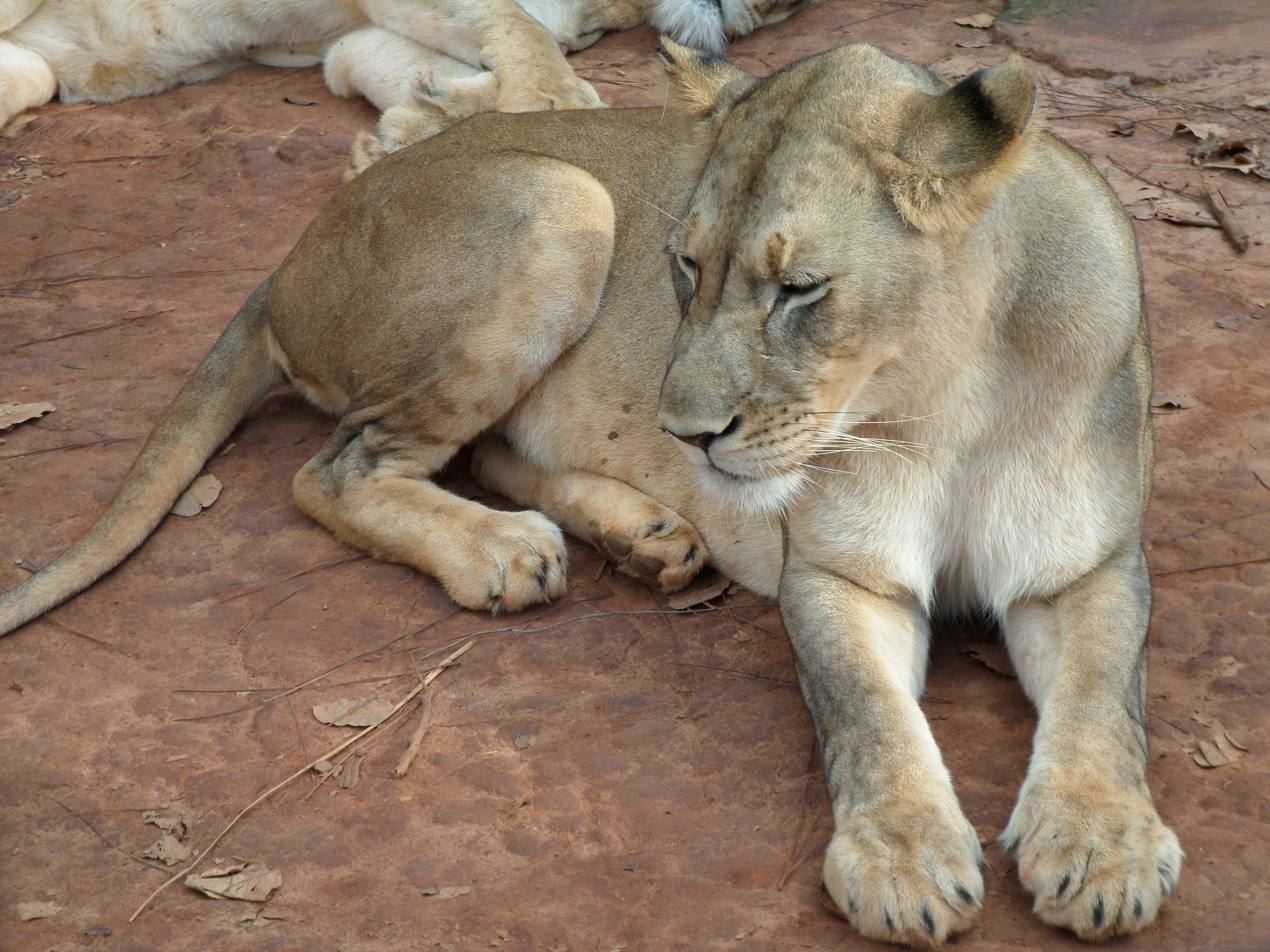
Captive lions in Mefou National Park

In 2006, 1258 captive lions were registered in the International Species Information System, including 13 individuals originating from Senegal to Cameroon, 115 from India and 970 with uncertain origin. In addition, several lions kept in Ethiopia's Addis Ababa Zoo were thought to be genetically similar to wild lions from Cameroon and Chad. They also differed from lions kept at Sana'a Zoo, which were suspected to be of Ethiopian origin. Genetic research did not corroborate this result, but placed these lions in P. l. melanochaita.

In 2023, a lion in the Niokolo-Koba National Park in Senegal has given birth to three cubs, two males and a female. The park is aiming to increase the lion population to 50 lions by the end 2025, before doubling that population in the 5 years after that.

== See also ==
- Damnatio ad bestias
- Cape lion
- White lion
