= Wildlife of the Central African Republic =

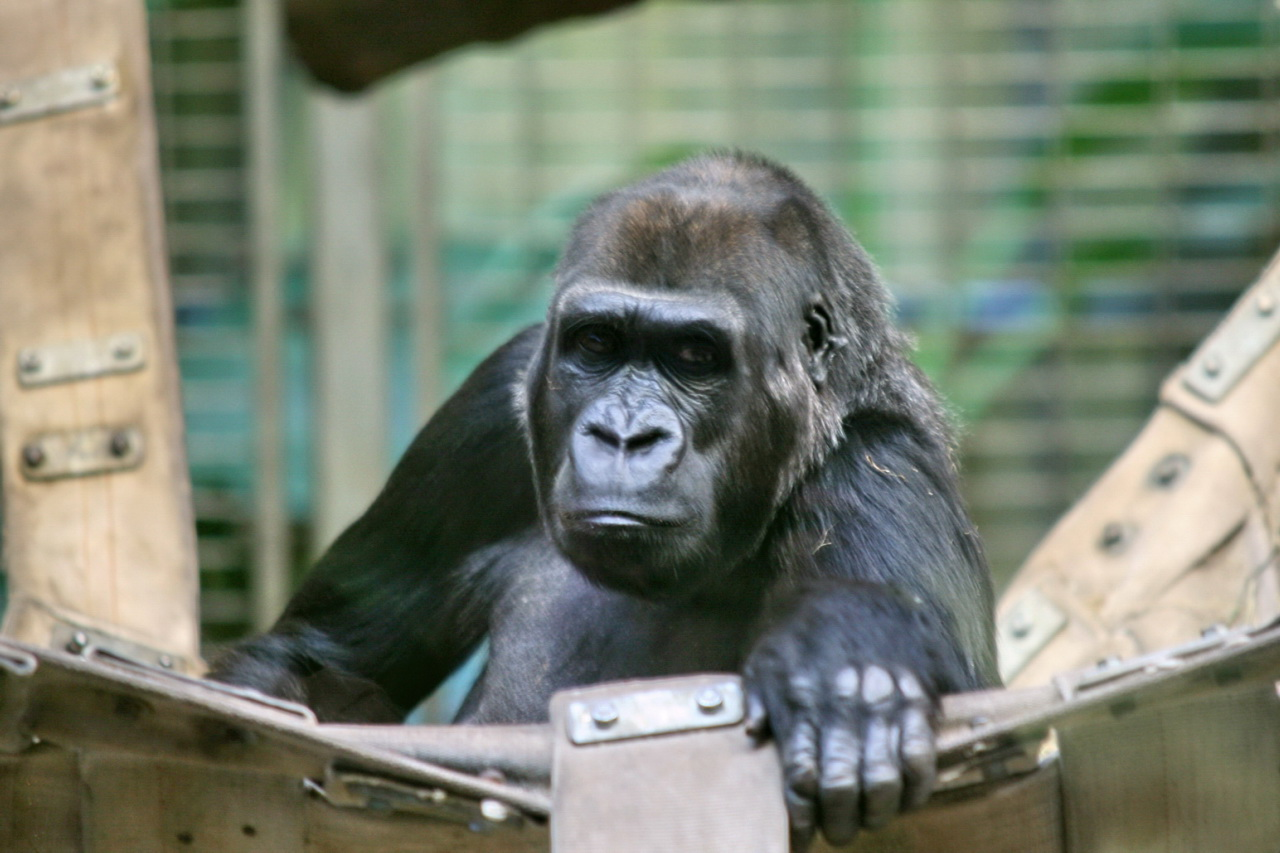
The western lowland gorilla (Gorilla gorilla) at the National Zoo in Washington, D.C.

Location of the Central African Republic

The wildlife of the Central African Republic is in the vast natural habitat in the Central African Republic (CAR) located between the Congo Basin's rain forests and large savannas, where the human density was smaller than 0.5 per km^{2} prior to 1850. The forest area of 22.755 million, considered one of the richest storehouses of wildlife spread over national parks, hunting reserves and community hunting areas, experienced an alarming loss of wildlife because of greed for ivory and bushmeat exploitation by hunters – mostly Arab slavers from across the borders of the Central African Republic with Chad and Sudan.

Realizing the serious threat to the wildlife, the colonists – French administration – in 1935 and later the government of the CAR, enacted laws and created national parks and preserves, which covered 16.6% of the country. The three most coveted national parks are the Manovo-Gounda St. Floris National Park with its reported "greatest concentrations of hippos in the world", the Bamingui-Bangoran National Park in the north; and the Dzanga-Sangha Reserve which covers rain forests. The Manovo-Gounda-Saint-Floris National Park, in particular was inscribed to the UNESCO List of World Heritage Sites in 1988 in recognition of the diversity of life present within it in respect of its wealth of flora and fauna. In 2014, the Chinko Nature Reserve in eastern CAR was granted management through a public-private partnership with the Central African Republic Ministry of Wildlife, Water and Forestry and African Parks, a conservation NGO that takes on the direct, long-term management of national parks and protected areas in partnership with governments to save wildlife, restore landscapes and ensure sustainable livelihoods for local communities. African Parks has a mandate to manage this protected area, now referred to as the Chinko Project, for the next 50 years.

However, the legal instruments were not effective in controlling poaching activities for profits, as institutional support for protected areas has all along been weak with hunters and loggers not letting go their activities even in national parks. Most of the timber extracted from the CAR is exported to Europe.

Situated in the east of the CAR, Chinko is one of the region's only remaining strongholds for numerous species including the highly threatened Lord Derby eland, bongo and chimpanzees. This important ecosystem, however, is under tremendous pressure from militarized ivory poachers and intense levels of cattle grazing.

The richness of the wildlife of the Central African Republic is reflected in its about 3,600 species of plants, 663 birds, 209 mammals (includes two endemic species and 11 threatened species), 187 reptiles and 29 amphibians.

== Geography ==
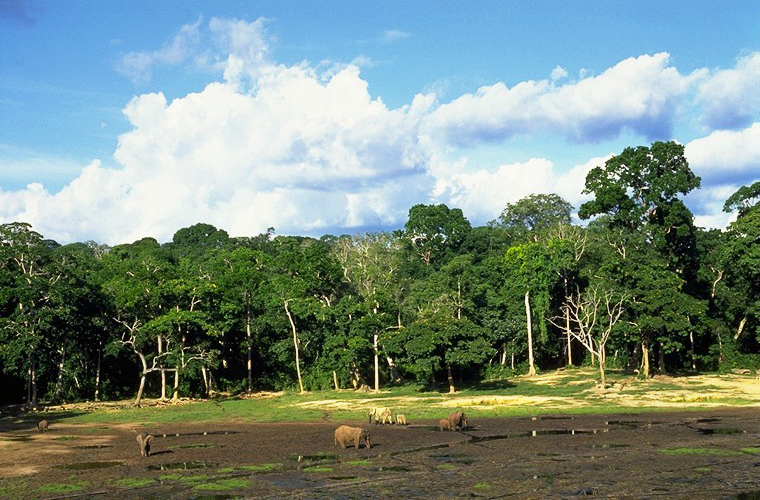
Dzanga-Sangha Reserve in the CAR

The Central African Republic, a landlocked country in Africa, which was once a French colony under the name Ubangi-Shari, is a rich rainforest area of 22.755 million ha with tropical forest covering 35% of the area of the country. The rich forests of the Central African Republic vary and largely are delimited within the major tropical rain forests of Africa and the great open savannas that stretch across the continent, south of the Sahara. Depending on climatic conditions, it is distributed with thick forests in the south, woody savanna in the center and grasslands in the north. Wildlife in these forests reflect all the species identified in Africa; the most conspicuous species include elephants, chimpanzees, crocodiles, hippos and giraffes.

The ecosystem in Central African Republic consists of the Western Congo Basin Forests, the Northeastern Congo Basin Forests and the Sudanian Savannas. The land use is categorized under the grass and shrub as 59%, under crops and settlements at 5% and major forests at 36% of the total land area of the country. Anthropological pressure is reported to be low in 46% area; medium in 44% and high in 10% of the land area.

Apart from all the savanna species of wild animals, the unique species found here are forest gorillas.

It had recorded the least percentage of forest loss, 1.9% from 1990 to 2005. Subsequently, logging roads were built not only to sustain subsistence agriculture but mostly for poaching for bush meat and ivory hunting, which has caused severe depletion of the abundant and diverse wildlife of CAR.

=== Manovo-Gounda St. Floris National Park ===
Manovo-Gounda St. Floris National Park is a national park and UNESCO World Heritage Site located in the Central African Republic. It was added to the list of World Heritage Sites in 1988 and it covers 1.74 million ha under category (ix)(x), recognising the diversity of life present within it, and under IUCN Category II. It encompasses three zones, "the flood plain of the Bahr Aouk and Bahr Kameur rivers in the north, the Massif des Bongo in the south, and a gently undulating transitional plain between". The vegetation types that dominate the park within these three zones consists of Sudanese-Guinean woodland savannah that is further subdivided under five types namely, "the Terminalia laxiflora wooded savannah; the Isoberlinia doka and Monotes kerstingii woodland; the Pseudocedrela kotschyi and Terminalia macroptera woodland; the mixed lowland woodland or wooded savannah; and Anogeissus leio and Khaya senegalensis". However, due to poaching activity within the park and severe loss of wildlife, it was added to the List of World Heritage in Danger in 1997. Some 59 species have been recorded within the park.

=== Dzanga-Sangha Special Reserve ===
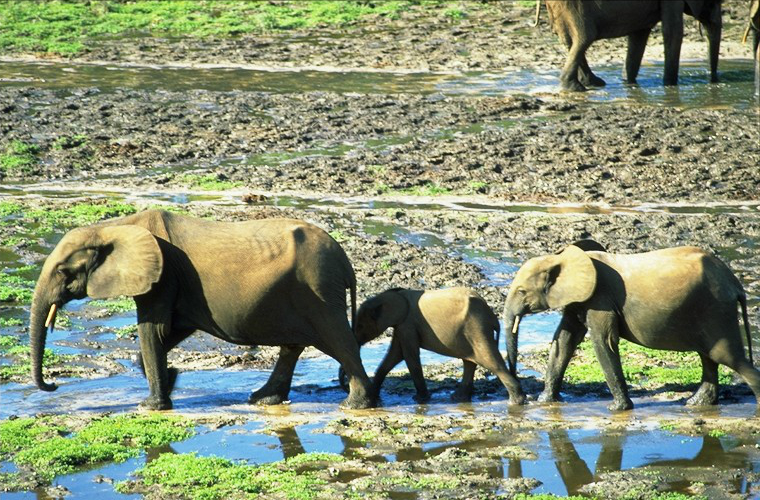
Forest elephants in the wetlands of saline Dzanga-Sangha

Dzanga-Sangha Special Reserve is a protected reserve of southwestern Central African Republic was established in 1990 and covers 6,865.54 km^{2} (2,650.80 sq mi). The forest special reserve was established in 1990 along with its neighbouring Dzanga Ndoki National Park. Until 1986, anybody was free to shoot game in the forest.

The reserve is ecologically rich and contains a variety of megafauna such as western lowland gorillas, African forest elephants, bongo antelopes, African forest buffalos, In 1999, the forest special reserve was administered collaboratively by the Central African Ministry of Environment, Water, Forests, Hunting and Fishing, and the World Wildlife Fund (WWF).

=== Chinko Project ===
Situated in east CAR, the Chinko Project provides a rare sanctuary for wildlife in a volatile region plagued by militarised ivory poachers and excessive cattle farming. Extreme poverty has resulted in a 95% depletion of all wildlife, making this one of the most crucial conservation projects on the continent. There are very few places on earth quite like Chinko. This landscape, comprising both tropical rainforest and savannah plains, is home to ten species of primate, two distinct types of elephant and the iconic Lord Derby eland.

== Legal ordinances ==
To preserve the unique forest vegetation that covers 35% of the land area of the country and the wildlife within it, and put an end to the intensive poaching activity from across its international border with Chad and Sudan, establishment of national parks and reserves to preserve the environment of rich natural heritage became a necessity. The French administration as colonists of the country in 1935 and later the government of the Central African Republic enacted laws to establish national parks, presidential parks, strict nature reserves, wildlife reserves, special reserves and biosphere reserves.

The national parks set up are the Andre Felix National Park, the Bamingui-Bangoran National Park, the Manovo-Gounda Saint Floris and the Zdanga-Ndoki; the presidential park is the D'Avakaba; the strict nature reserves are the Mbaéré-Bodingué Reserve and the Vassaka-Bolo Reserve; the wildlife reserves are Aouk-Aoukale Reserve, Gribingui-Bamingui Reserve, Koukourou-Bamingui Reserve, Nana-Barya Reserve, Ouandja-Vakaga Reserve, the Yata-Ngaya Reserve and the Zemongo Reserve; the special reserve is the Dzanga-Sangha; and the biosphere reserve is Basse-Lobaye.

Important ordinances enacted by the Central African Republic concern protection of wild life and regulation of hunting, under the guideline that wild life forms an integral part of the national heritage. The law defines categories of protected areas and prescribed rules for their establishment, apart from the management aspects of fully and partially protected species and ordinary game species; regulation hunting procedures also have been listed for ordinary game species. Hunting of fully protected species is banned. Partially protected species can be taken with specific permission. The capturing and transport of wild animals by and under the control of the Wildlife Department, enforcement measures and penalties are also defined.

== Flora ==
The flora of the Central African Republic has not been very well studied at all, although at least 3600 species are known. However, there are likely to be as many as 5000 species. The country is mainly dominated by Sudanian woodland, although a small area of Acacia dominates the Sahelian woodland in the extreme north. Many of the species which are endemic to the country are located in the hills of northeast, especially in the Massif des Bongos and Massif du Dar Chala in the Yata Ngaya Faunal Reserve area. Notable northern forests include Kotto, Kaga-Bandoro and Nana forest. Savanna reserves in the north are important for large mammals, especially Bamingui-Bangoran National Park and Biosphere Reserve and Manovo-Gounda St. Floris National Park and the north of the country also contains floodplains.

In the southwest is lowland forest and secondary grassland interspersed with forest in the Bangassou area of the south. Lowland forest exists in the southwest in the Dzangha-Sangha and Mbaere Bodingue Ngoto areas. Shrubs and bush vegetation mostly confined in the extreme northern region. Tropical forests cover 3.5 million ha. The tropical forests contain luxuriant plant growth with hundreds of plant species including Entradrolphragus angolensis, Lophira alata, Manilkara mabokeensis, Monodora myristica, Ricinodendron heudlotii, along with the African tulip tree, rubber tree, strangler fig, and Cecropia species.

In the Central African Republic forest cover is around 36% of the total land area, equivalent to 22,303,000 ha (86,110 sq mi) of forest in 2020, down from 22,203,000 ha (85,730 sq mi) in 1990. In 2020, naturally regenerating forest covered 22,301,000 ha (86,100 sq mi) and planted forest covered 2,000 ha (7.7 sq mi). Of the naturally regenerating forest 9% was reported to be primary forest (consisting of native tree species with no clearly visible indications of human activity). For the year 2015, 91% of the forest area was reported to be under public ownership and 9% private ownership. In 2021, the rate of deforestation in the Central African Republic increased by 71%.

Woodland savannah mainly consists of Vitellaria paradoxa, Combretum spp., Acacia spp., Anogeissus leiocarpa, Afzelia africana, Burkea africana, Isoberlinia doka, Terminalia spp., Khaya senegalensis, Rafia sudanica and Borassus spp. along the rivers.

== Fauna ==
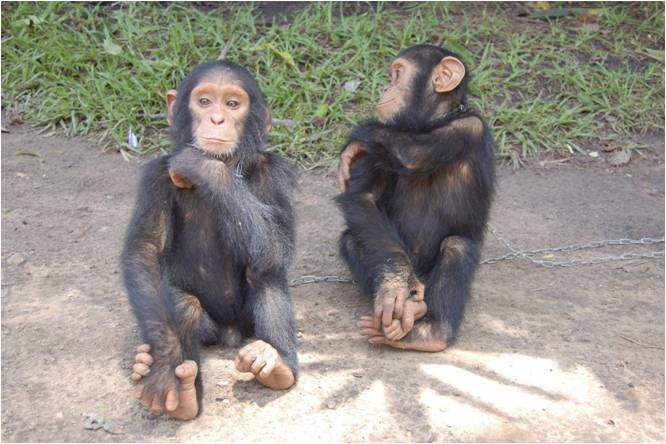
Chimpanzees in the Central African Republic

The fauna of the CAR consists of 209 mammal species, of which two are endemic and 11 are threatened. The threatened species listed in the 2004 IUCN Red List of Threatened Animals are: endangered species namely, chimpanzee (Pan troglodytes), gorilla (Gorilla gorilla), giant African water shrew (Potamogale velox), red colobus (Procolobus badius) and wild dog (Lycaon pictus); and the vulnerable species are African elephant (Loxodonta africana), African golden cat (Profelis aurata), cheetah (Acinonyx jubatus), Gounda mouse (Mus goundae); endemic species are Hun shrew (Crocidura attila), lion (Panthera leo), and Oubangui mouse (Mus oubanguii), red-fronted gazelle (Gazella rufifrons) and spotted-necked otter (Lutra maculicollis]). The Gabon dwarf shrew (Suncus remyi), which was critically endangered in the past is now a species of least concern.

The southwest has a colourful variety of butterflies. The faunal species are listed in the Animal Diversity Web of the University of Michigan Museum of Zoology, some of which are mentioned in the following sections. Both crocodiles and hippopotamuses are found in the rivers.

=== Mammals ===
Mammals are African forest elephant (Loxodonta cyclotis), chimpanzees, forest buffalo or dwarf buffalo, forest antelopes (bongo), moustached monkey, (Cercopithecus cephus), Hyperolius viridiflavus, blue duiker (Philantomba monticola), black-cheeked white-nosed monkey (Cercopithecus ascanius), guereza (Colobus guereza), oribi (Ourebia ourebi), Angolan colobus (Colobus angolensis), Pennant's red colobus (Piliocolobus pennantii), puku (Kobus vardonii), western gorilla (Gorilla gorilla), white buffalo (Syncerus caffer), roan antelope (Hippotragus equinus), giant Lord's Derby eland (Taurotragus derbianus).

Western lowland gorillas are tracked in the Dzanga-Sangha Reserve in the south of the Central African Republic, apart from witnessing elephants in groups of 30 to 100 bathing in mud pools and feeding. Forest elephants, heavily poached in the past, found only in the rain forests, are comparatively smaller in size compared with elephants in the savanna habitat; even their ivory are stated to be harder, stronger with a different shade called the "pink or hot ivory". Likewise, forest buffaloes found here, also called the dwarf buffaloes, are shorter in size compared with those in the savanna. Black rhino (Diceros bicornis) now is reported to be an extinct species in the CAR dropping "from 3,000 to 0". Because of poaching and diseases caused from introducing illegal cattle transhumance, elephant (Loxodonta africana) and buffon kob (Kobus kob) populations declined by more than 80% each in 20 years.

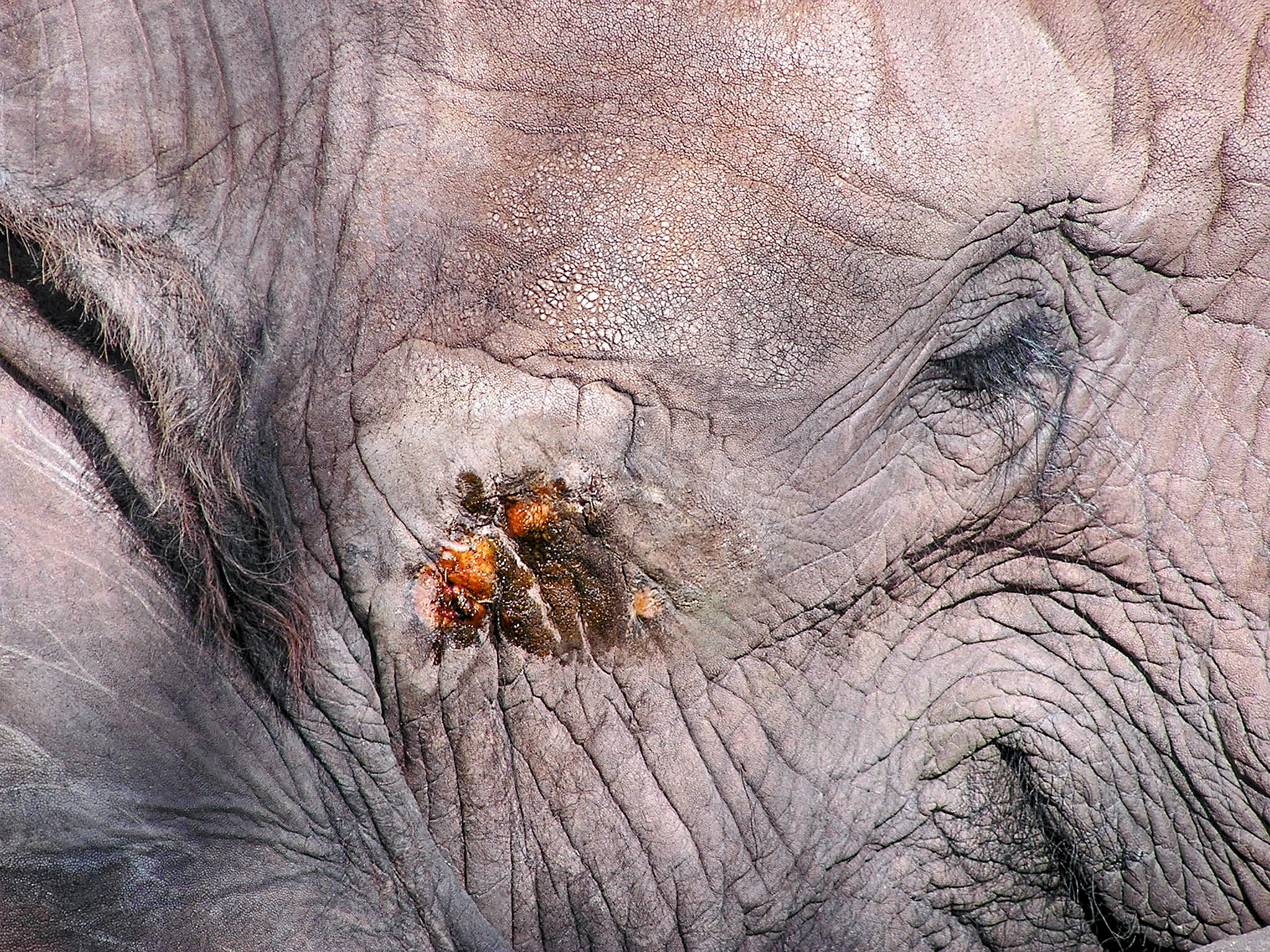
An African elephant in a musth state.

Breeding of elephants in the dry months of December to March and July and August has interesting aspects. Males are said to be in rut or musth when it is noted that secretions appear near their head as dark stains combined with continuous dribbling of urine. During this musth time they roam in the forest in search of females in estrous state, based on smell and the "estrous song", which the females belt out. They are heard over several miles in the forest. Hunting of elephants is prohibited.

As of 1990, the country had about 1,500 giraffe and 8,000 buffalo in the Manovo-Gounda St. Floris National Park and 6,800 in Bamingui-Bangoran National Park. There are 19 or 20 species of primates in Central African Republic. Of particular note are gorillas, protected in the Dzanga-Sangha reserve and chimpanzees which are protected in the Zemongo Faunal Reserve and also are found south of Bambio and east of Bayanga.

The country has 23 species of antelopes and one of Africa's largest populations of giant eland in its north and east. Significant numbers of duiker, sitatunga and bongo are found in the southwest, particularly at Bangassou. The unusual features of the forest antelopes found in the CAR is that they all have spiral horns and striped pelages. The country has 10 recorded species of bats, of which one is endemic, Epomophorus gambianus poussarguesi.

Carnivores

Carnivores reported are: spotted hyenas (Crocuta crocuta), Sudan cheetahs (Acinonyx jubatus soemmeringii), African leopards (Panthera pardus pardus) and Chadian wild dogs (Lycaon pictus sharicus).

Rodents

Rodents include Zenkerella insignis, Prionomys batesi, Hylomyscus fumosus and two endemic species of mouse; Mus goundae in the north and Mus oubanguii from the south. Also found are giant otter shrew (Potamogale velox), Gambian rat (Cricetomys gambianus), Pousargues's mongoose (Dologale dybowskii), checkered elephant-shrew (Rhynchocyon cirnei), Delany's swamp mice (Delanymyinae), and Bioko Allen's bushbaby (Sciurocheirus alleni).

=== Reptiles ===
Reptiles of the Central African Republic as listed in the laws of the land are: Geochelone sulcata, giant tortoise, Varanus species, python, and crocodile.

=== Bats and birds ===
The CAR forests includes lesser woolly bat (Kerivoula lanosa), Veldkamp's bat (Nanonycteris veldkampii), grey parrot (Psittacus erithacus), African fish eagle (Haliaeetus vocifer), grey-cheeked hornbill (Bycanistes subcylindricus), shoebill (Balaeniceps rex), yellow-fronted canary (Serinus mozambicus), Dzanga robin (Stiphrornis sanghensis), Hartlaub's duck (Pteronetta hartlaubii), ostrich (Struthio camelus), little grebe (Tachybaptus ruficollis), pelican, cattle egret (Bubulcus ibis), hamerkop (Scopus umbretta), saddle-billed stork (Ephippiorhynchus senegalensis), yellow-billed stork (Mycteria ibis) and raptors and water birds. In the Manovo-Gounda St. Floris National Park 379 species of birds have been sighted, which can be seen from observation platforms built in the park or by taking a boat ride on the Sangha River or its tributary, the Mossapoula River.

=== Insects ===
Lepidoptera

== Conservation ==
There was a time when Central African Republic was given the epithet "an animal paradise". However, in centuries this situation changed even though several parks and reserves were created. As a result of uncontrolled poaching, the number of elephants dropped from 100,000 to less than 10,000 and the rhinoceros almost disappeared.

To conserve the rich wildlife resources of the Central African Republic has become a major concern, in spite of establishing, with legal ordinances, national parks and game reserves. The main reasons for this has been the vastness and impoverished status of the country as a whole. However, the effectiveness of wildlife crime law enforcement appears to be working now with the Central African Ministry of Water and Forests and the Central Police, with technical support from international environmental organizations such as WWF playing an effective role, to punish high-level traffickers with penal servitude and fines; a case cited is of a trafficker sentenced to a jail term of six months and a fine.

In conservation efforts, the WWF has persuaded the Baka, indigenous hunter-gatherers known as pygmies of Central African Republic, to work for the conservation of the wildlife in their homeland on which they subsisted. In a wildlife reserve exclusively devoted to preserve the rights of the pygmies and prevent deforestation, bushmeat hunting and human migration, the Baka community has extended full cooperation and effective participation. By honoring the traditional rights of the community to fish, hunt and gather food, and also providing alternate employment as trackers and park rangers with health care, and with income generated from ecotourism, there is an encouraging sign of elephant poaching figures showing drastic downward trend.

The forest department of Central African Republic has introduced new forest codes in 2008 to ensure better management of resources on a sustainable basis to regulate and preserve biodiversity/ The goal is to balance growth and employment requirements with attention to check desertification. Under the new laws, border control inspectors with mobile squads have been introduced to check the movement of lumber crossing the nation's borders, enhance revenues from forestry with cognizance of the forestry and wildlife sources of the country. A financial mechanism has also been introduced at a communal level for local management of money.

== Gallery ==
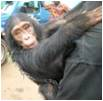
Chimpanzees in Central African Republic

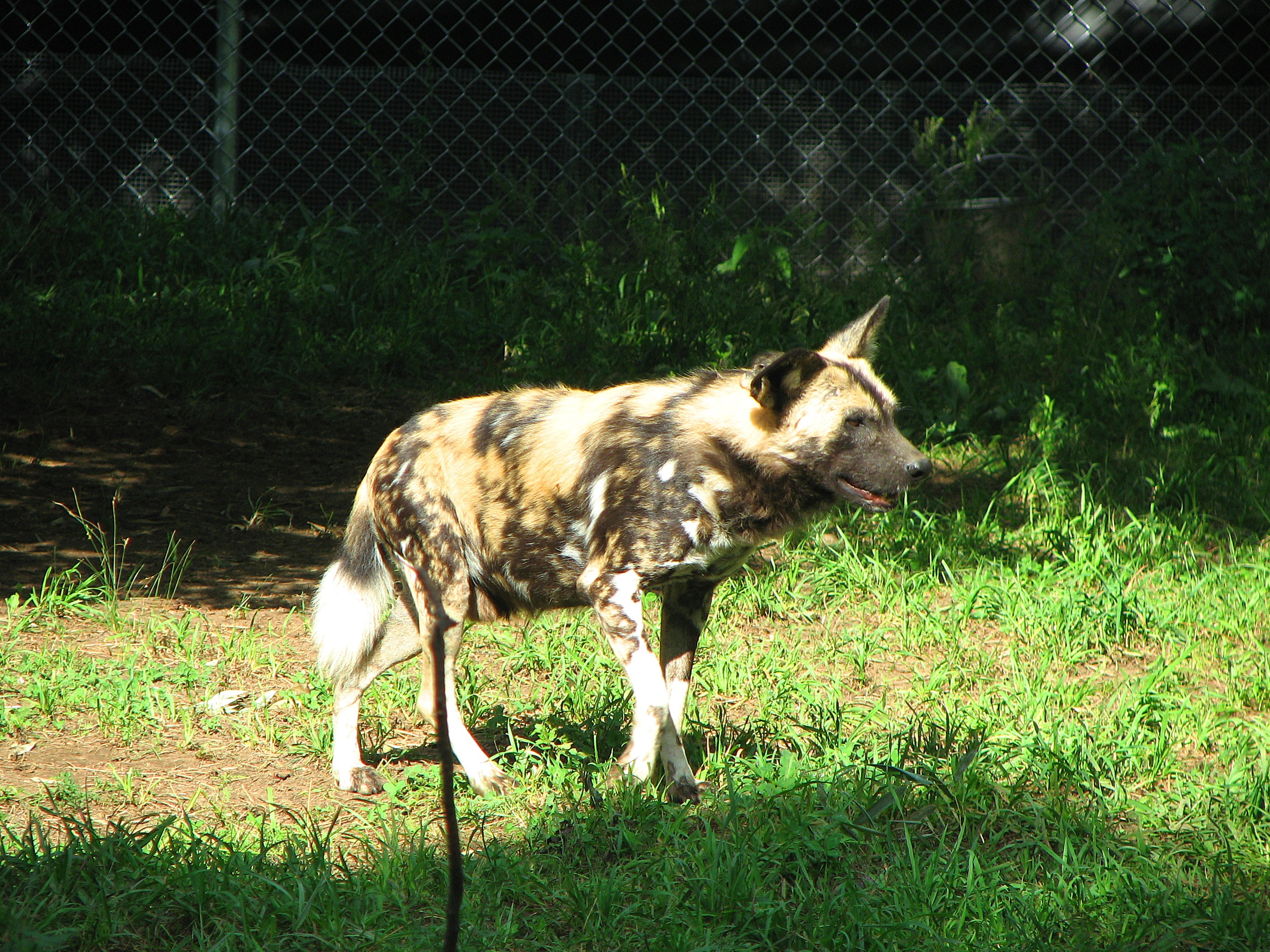
African wild dog in Central African Republic are estimate only for 150 individuals

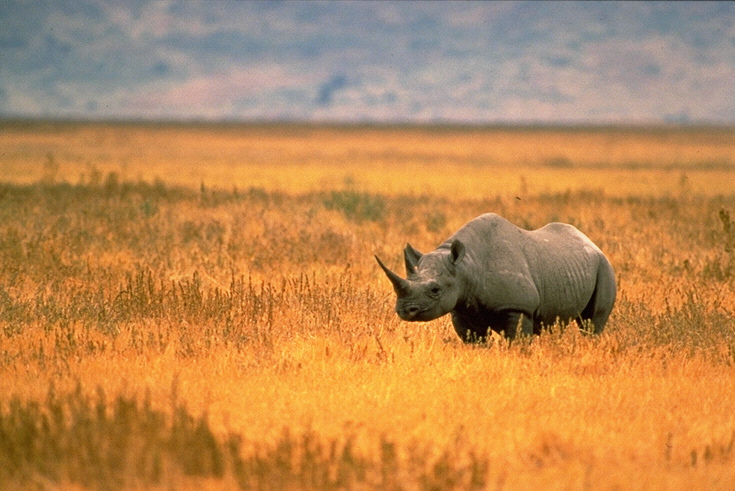
Black rhinoceros

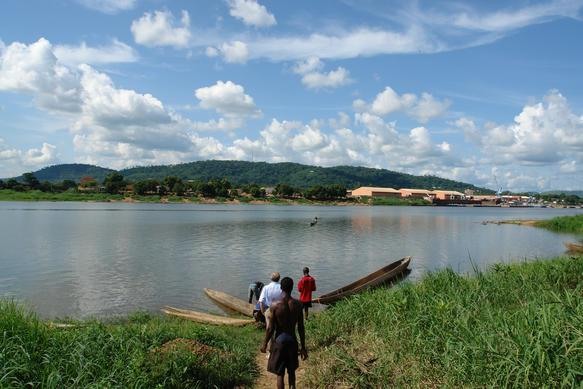
Ubangi River

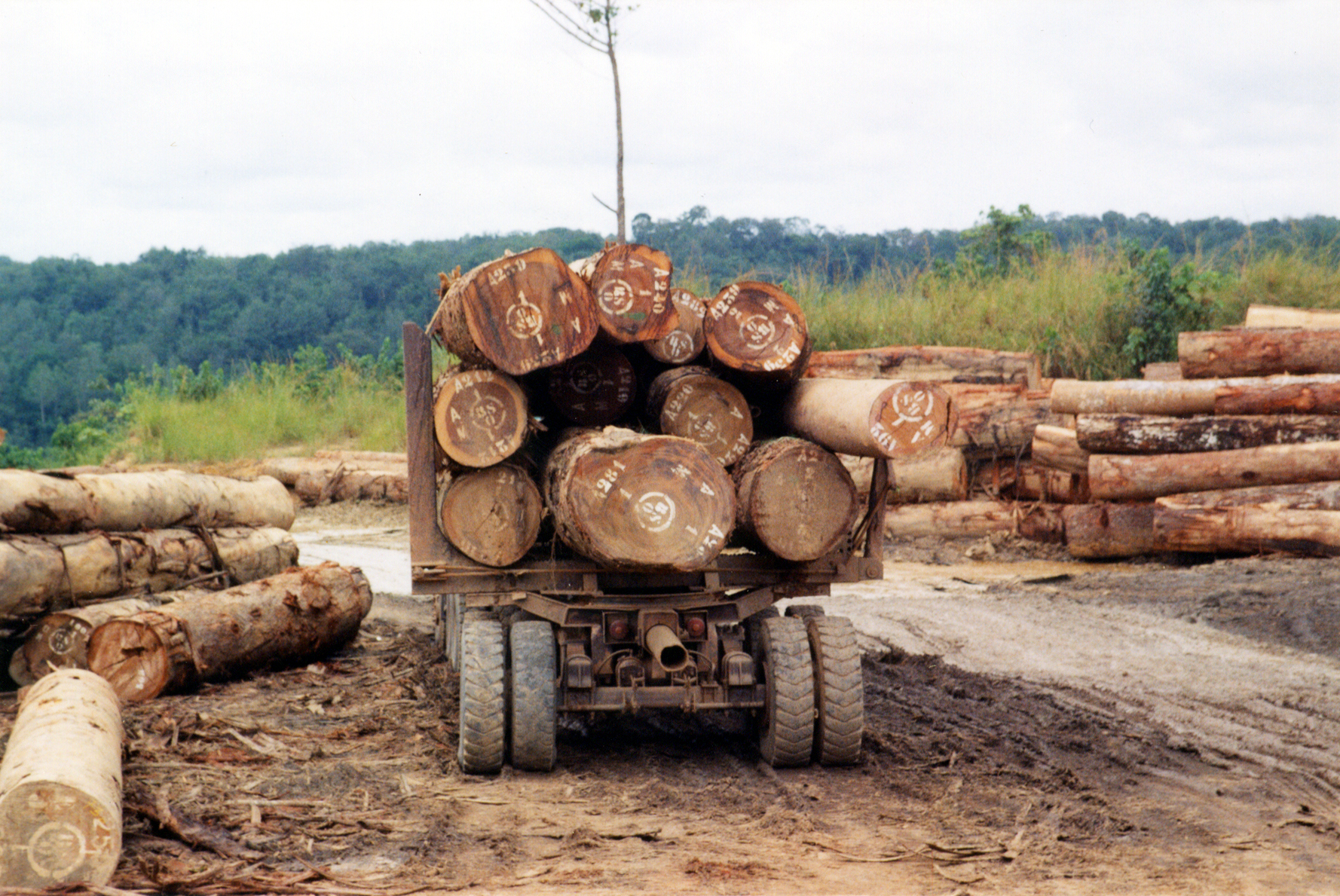
Transportation of logs
