= Radom National Park =

Protected area in Sudan

- IUCN category II (national park)
- Location within Sudan
- Coordinates: 9°10′N 24°0′E
- Area: 12,509.70 km^{2} (4,830.02 sq mi)
- Established: 1980

Radom National Park (alternate Al-Radom Reserve; Arabic: محمية الردوم الطبيعية) is a biosphere reserve in South Darfur, Sudan.

Currently this national park is disputed between Sudan and South Sudan because the area of Kafia Kingi, which makes up the vast majority of the National Park, was to be transferred to South Sudan through the Comprehensive Peace Agreement of 2005. However, Sudan is still holding some weak control over the area. In 2020, a South Sudanese general said the area is being used by people to smuggle minerals.

The Park is 1,250,970 hectares (3,091,200 acres) in size. The Adda and Umblasha Rivers form the park’s northern and southern boundaries. Contiguous to Radom is the Andre Felix National Park of the Central African Republic. Established as a park, it was designated in 1979 as a member of the World Network of Biosphere Reserves.

Rivers, streams, and permanent pools cover much of the park, which is characterized as a wooded savannah. Approximately 90% of the habitat is shrubland, while the remainder is forest. Annual rainfall ranges between 900–1,700 millimetres (35–67 in); the mean annual relative humidity ranges between 57-65%; and the average annual temperature is 16-27 C. Major villages within the park include: Radom, Mesheitir, Bireikat, Um Gudul, Songo, al Hufra, Bimeza, Deim Gushara, Chili West, Majid, Dafag, Titribi, Kafindibei West, Kafindibei East, Amara, Um Hugaar, Kafiakingi, Karmandoura, and Shioulla.

== Conservation issues ==
The park has suffered from commercial game poaching. Subsequent to the country's 1985 famine era, the tora hartebeest completely disappeared from the park. The defassa waterbuck has also disappeared from the park.
