= Chinko =

Nature reserve in the Central African Republic

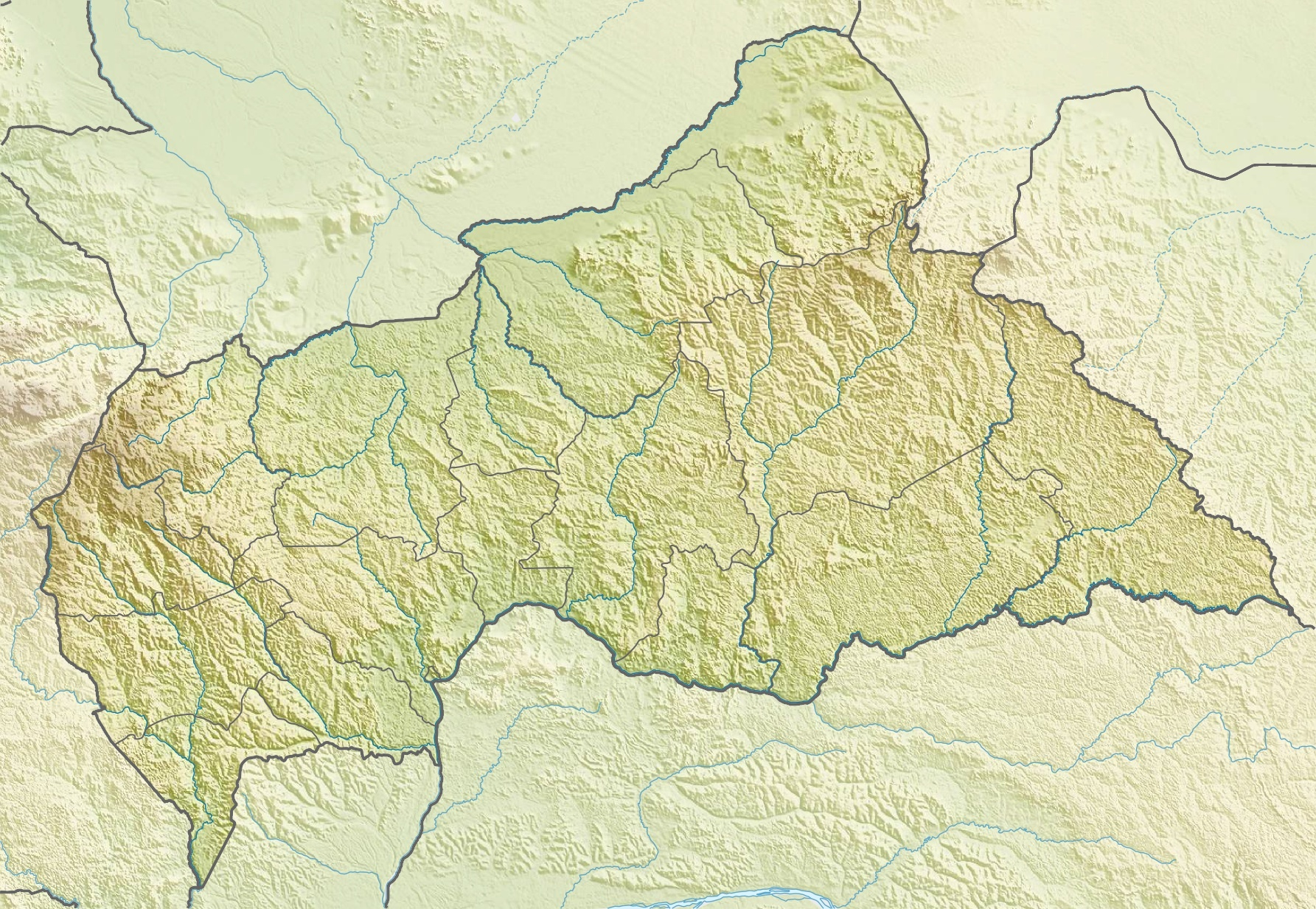
- Location within Central African Republic
- Location: Central African Republic
- Coordinates: 06°03′05″N 23°53′47″E
- Area: 24,335 km^{2} (9,396 sq mi)
- Administrator: African Parks

Chinko, also known as Chinko Nature Reserve and the Chinko Project Area, is a protected area in the Central African Republic. The nonprofit conservation organization African Parks began managing Chinko in partnership with the government of the Central African Republic in December 2014.

== Description and terrain ==
Chinko is a 5.9-million-hectare (15-million-acre) protected area in the southeastern part of the Central African Republic, managed by the nonprofit conservation organization African Parks as part of a fifty-year public–private partnership with the Ministry of Water, Forest, Hunting and Fishing. African Parks began managing Chinko in December 2014, becoming the eighth park to be included in the organization's management portfolio. David Simpson, who co-founded the project, serves as the park's manager.

Chinko is located on a volcanic plateau, 600 metres (2,000 feet) above sea level. Rain and other freshwater sources are plentiful, and Precambrian bedrock erosion has created a layer of alluvial soil, allowing abundant and diverse wildlife to disperse throughout the region. The park has been described having uncommon geology, plentiful water, and a role as a "diversifying agent".

== Flora and fauna ==
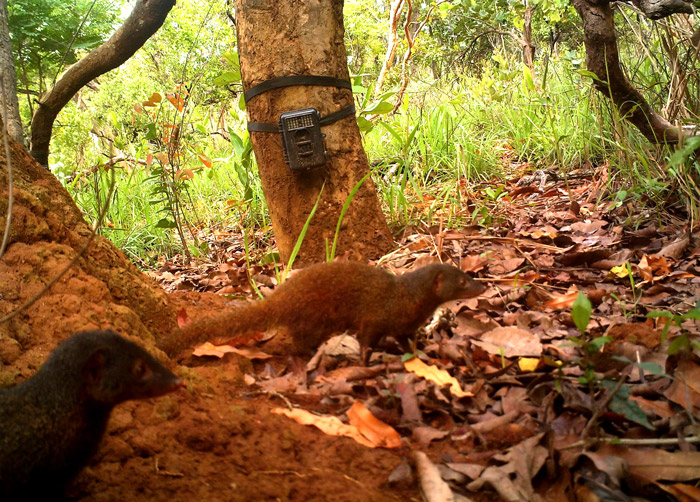
Pousargues's mongoose in the park in 2012

Chinko has 17,600 km^{2} (6,800 sq mi) of "uninhabited Medio-Sudanian and Sudano Guinean" wooded savannah with some Congolese rainforest. These diverse ecosystems form an ecotone within the Chinko River basin and support a variety of wildlife, including several primate species, African forest elephants, 23 even-toed ungulate species, more than 20 types of carnivores, 5 anteater mammals, and approximately 500 bird species. Carnivores include the African wild dog, leopard, lion, and mongoose. Other species include: African buffalo, bongo, chimpanzee, monkey, crocodile, Eastern giant eland, giant forest hog, hartebeest (including Lelwel hartebeest), red forest duiker, warthog, waterbuck, and yellow-backed duiker.

The reserve is home to dozens of endangered species, and the following bird species: black-bellied bustards, buzzards, guineafowl, hoopoes, hornbills, kingfishers, secretarybirds, stone partridge, and sunbirds. Chinko, being an extensive block of pristine habitat, can provide the genetic diversity to recolonize the surrounding regions when populations there dwindle or become locally extinct.

== History ==
Chinko previously served as a hunting reserve and was home to thousands of buffalo, elephant, and lion. The area saw significant decreases in wildlife populations during the 1980s–2000s because of cattle grazing, the ivory trade, and poaching. In 2002, it was reported that as much as 95 percent of wildlife in the Chinko region was lost.

Erik Mararv and his family acquired a hunting concession in 2005 and launched a safari operation called Central African Wildlife Adventures in 2006. During the safari's six years of operating, the Mararv family built two airstrips, guest rooms, and hundreds of miles of roads, imported machinery and trucks, and trained staff. David Simpson started working as a pilot for the safari company in 2010, and was asked by Mararv to return as general manager the following year. Foreign pastoralists, known as the Wodaabe (or Mbororo), started herding in more remote parts of the Central African Republic, including Chinko and surrounding areas, around 2012. The additional cattle grazing, overgrazing, poaching, and wildfires contributed to deforestation, desertification, and erosion. The United States Fish and Wildlife Service contributed nearly $100,000 in 2013 to reduce poaching by training rangers and reaching out to local communities to increase awareness of conservation efforts. Simpson co-created the Chinko Project to protect the area's habitat and wildlife, and began managing the park when African Parks took over operations in 2014. Thierry Aebischer, Raffael Hickisch, and Erik Mararv have also been credited as partners of the project.

Chinko had fifty park rangers in February 2016. In mid 2016, Simpson was reportedly managing 400 staff members and a $2.5 million budget, and Chinko was "the only major tax-generating entity in the entire eastern half of the Central African Republic, and one of the largest employers and importers of foreign goods in the country". Chinko staff collected more than 700,000 wildlife sightings from motion-activated cameras by mid 2016, and used a small aircraft to identify and track animals and park intruders. Fondation Segré partnered with African Parks in 2016 to hire and train rangers, construct operations centers, improve communications technology, purchase equipment, and enhance data management.

In January 2017, a helicopter chartered by African Parks crashed, killing the park's head of law enforcement, his deputy, and the pilot.

In April 2020, the government of CAR and African Parks entered into a revised public-private partnership agreement, extending the core protected area to 24,335 km2 and increasing the total protected management area to 55,000 km^{2} (21,000 sq mi) over a period of 25 years.

In 2024, African Parks reported that Chinko had over 350 nationals employed, which made it the largest employer outside of Bangui.

== See also ==
- List of protected areas of the Central African Republic
- Wildlife of the Central African Republic
