= Ouandjia Vakaga Faunal Reserve =

Ouandjia-Vakaga Faunal Reserve
- IUCN category II (national park)
- Interactive map of Ouandjia-Vakaga Faunal Reserve

The Ouandjia-Vakaga Faunal Reserve is found in Central African Republic. It was established in 1925.This site is 7233 km^{2}.
