= Tourism in the Central African Republic =

The Central African Republic has seen little international tourism due to its recent history of conflict, an ongoing civil war, and resulting insecurity in certain areas of the country, particularly the north and northwest. The CAR has also been affected by regional conflicts, such as the South Sudanese Civil War and fighting in neighbouring countries. In 2020, the country recorded a total of 34,600 tourists, ranking 159th in the world. The tourism sector had US$30,900,000 of revenue, making up 1.2% of the country's GDP. 66% of tourists arrived from other African countries, and 100% travelled by air.

Several countries have a travel advisory discouraging all travel to the Central African Republic due to civil unrest and violent crime, including the United Kingdom and United States. the Chinese embassy in the Central African Republic warned against travel outside the capital city of Bangui in 2023 following attacks on Chinese nationals in the country. The French embassy in the country similarly warned French nationals against travel outside Bangui in 2024.

The Central African Republic is known for its national parks and rare natural wildlife. Major tourist attractions in the country include Dzanga-Sangha Complex of Protected Areas, M'Baïki, and the Chutes de Boali.
