= Nana Barya Faunal Reserve =

Coordinates: 7°38′56″N 17°30′32″E

Nana-Barya Faunal Reserve
- IUCN category IV (habitat/species management area)
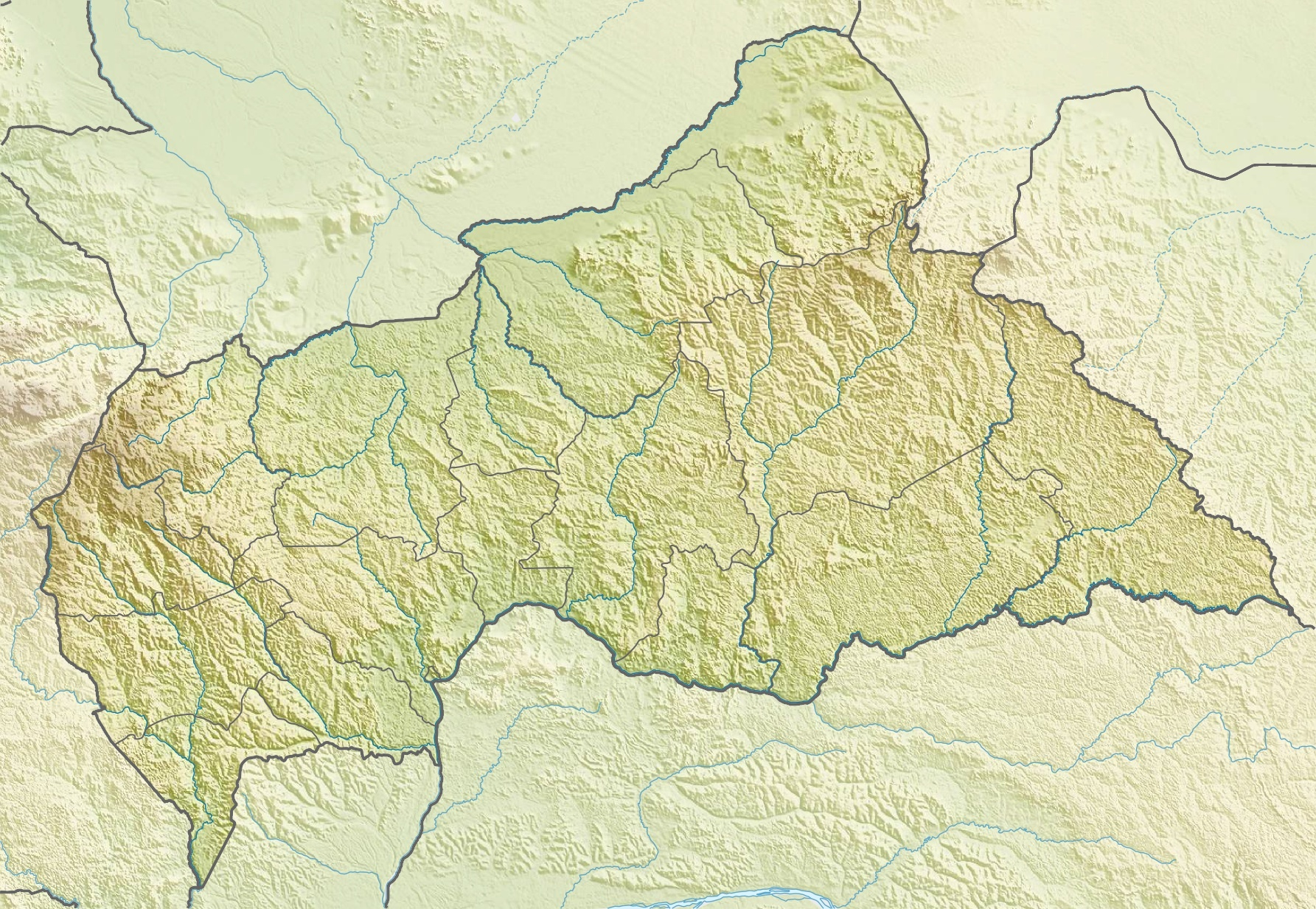
- Location within Central African Republic
- Area: 2,313.65 km^{2} (893.31 sq mi)
- Established: 1953

The Nana-Barya Faunal Reserve is a protected area in the Central African Republic covering an area of 2,313.65 km^{2} (893.31 sq mi) that was established in 1953. Since 2005, it is considered a Lion Conservation Unit.
