= Andre Felix National Park =

National park in the Central African Republic

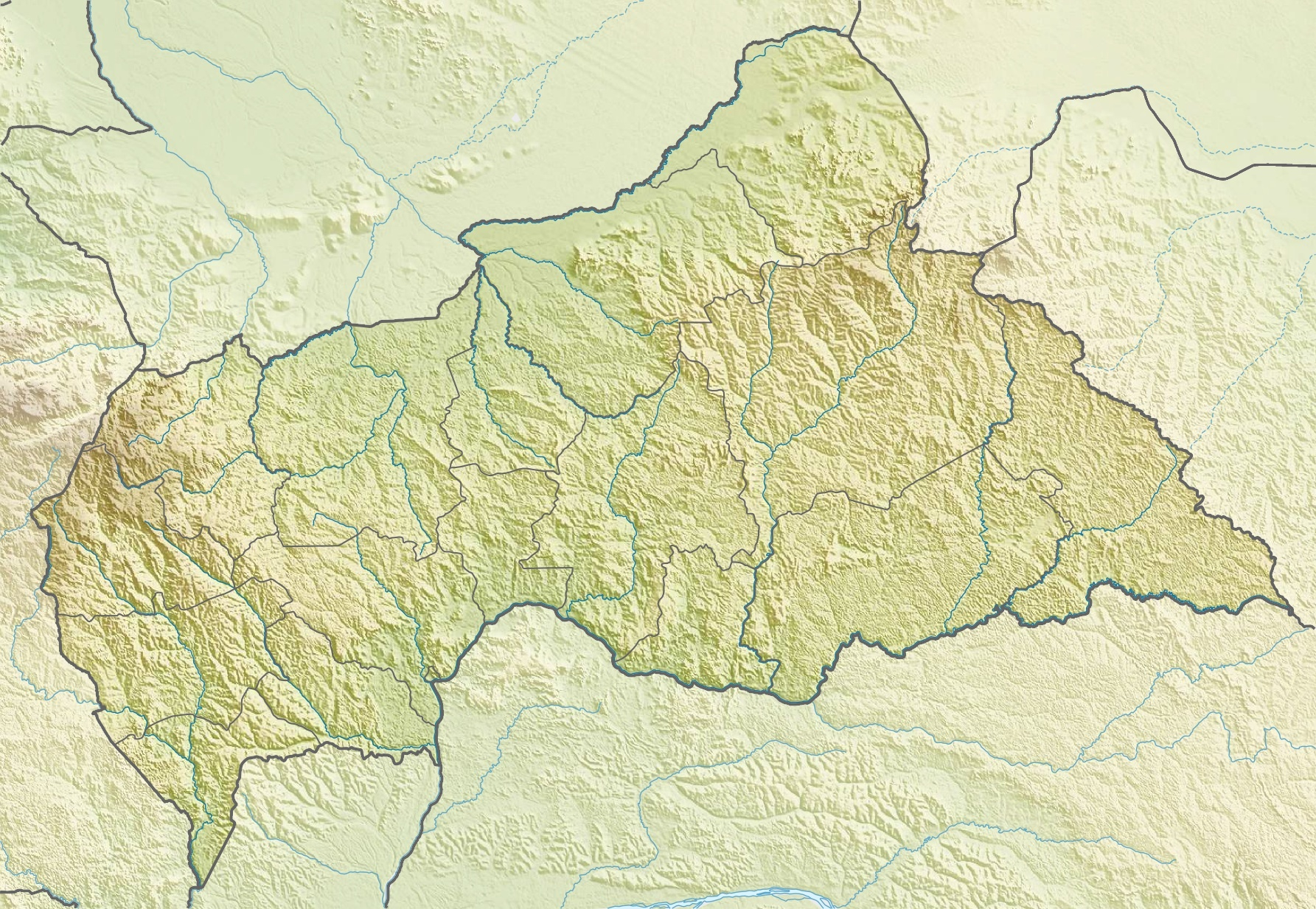
- Location within Central African Republic
- Location: Central African Republic
- Coordinates: 9°30′N 23°20′E
- Area: 1,700 km^{2} (660 sq mi)
- Established: 1960

The Andre Felix National Park is a national park found in the Central African Republic, contiguous to Radom National Park in Sudan. It was established in 1960 and its area is 951 km^{2}.

== Environment ==
The park consists of a low-lying open savanna forest in its north, vegetated with Bambusa, Isoberlinia and Terminalia. It has more elevated, denser forest in its south.

The park has been designated an Important Bird Area (IBA) by BirdLife International because it supports significant populations of Heuglin's spurfowl, red-throated bee-eaters, black-breasted barbets, fox kestrels, yellow-billed shrikes, piapiacs, green-backed eremomelas, purple starlings, chestnut-crowned sparrow-weavers, red-winged pytilias, black-rumped waxbills and brown-rumped buntings. There are also various mammals including, just outside the IBA to the north-west, an isolated population of greater kudu.
