= Aouk Aoukale Faunal Reserve =

Aouk-Aoukale Faunal Reserve
- Réserve de Faune de l'Aouk-Aoukale
- IUCN category IV (habitat/species management area)
- Interactive map of Aouk-Aoukale Faunal Reserve
- Coordinates: 9.97°N 21.56°E
- Established: 1939

The Aouk-Aoukale Faunal Reserve (French: Réserve de Faune de l'Aouk-Aoukale) is a national park found in the Central African Republic. It was established in 1939. This site is 3,451 square kilometres (1,332 mi^{2}). It is located in Vakaga prefecture. The Bahr Aouk River runs through the reserve.
