= Bamingui-Bangoran National Park and Biosphere Reserve =

National park in the Central African Republic

Bamingui-Bangoran National Park
- IUCN category II (national park)
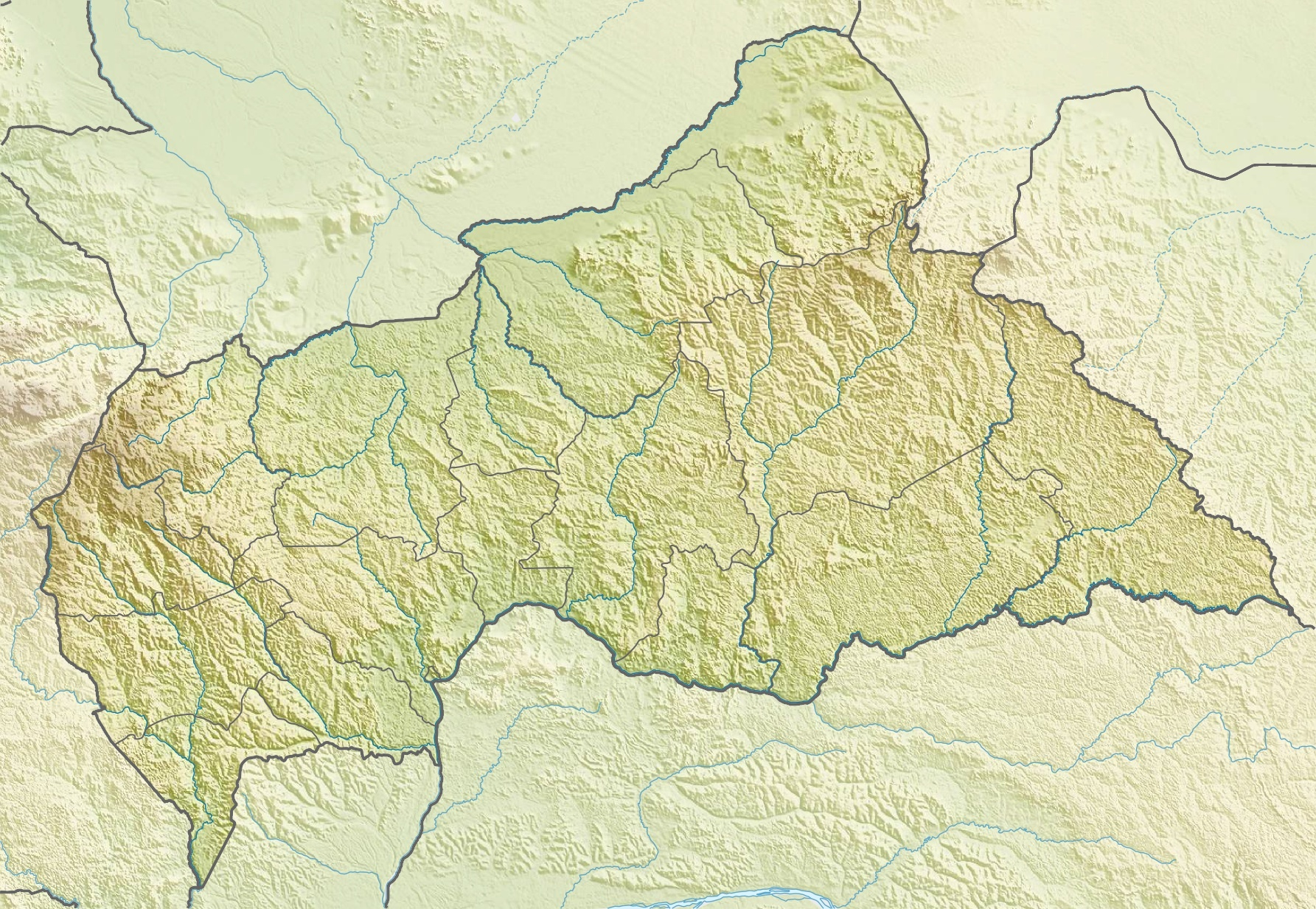
- Location within Central African Republic
- Location: Central African Republic
- Coordinates: 8°11′N 20°14′E
- Area: 11,191 km^{2} (4,321 sq mi)
- Established: 1933

The Bamingui-Bangoran National Park complex is a national park and biosphere reserve located in the northern region of the Central African Republic. It makes up part of the Guinea-Congo Forest biome. The Vassako Bolo Strict Nature Reserve is in the midst of the park.

== History ==
It was established in 1993. In 2012, the park was captured by Séléka rebels leading to its decline. In 2018, rangers employed by Wildlife Conservation Society began patrolling the park. On 18 December 2018, park rangers clashed with rebels on hunting. One rebel was killed and the other three fled.

== Geography and environment ==
The park and biosphere reserve complex is located in the country's centre-north, west of N'Délé and close to the border with Chad. Reachable from Bangui, the capital city, it is situated to the west of Manovo-Gounda St. Floris National Park, and holds a higher density and a larger number of wild animals than Manovo-Gounda.

The national park is 1,070,000 ha in size, and lies within the mid-Sudanian phytogeographic domain of the Central African Republic. It is situated on a plateau at an elevation of 400–500 m (1,300–1,600 ft) above sea level. Its waterways drain north-westwards to the Chari River. The left bank floodplain of the Bamingui River is protected for 202 km (126 mi), as are 105 km (65 mi) of floodplain on the Bangoran River. A relatively small section, of about 30 km (19 mi), on the Bangoran's right bank, is excluded from protection.

The climate includes a rainy season of May–October in the southern reaches, while diminishing to June–September in the northern areas. It can be muggy all year.

=== Flora and fauna ===
Bamingui-Bangoran's major ecosystem is characterized as tropical dry or deciduous forests while the major habitats and land covers are dry forests, wooded savannas, edaphic savannas, and gallery forests. Trees include the Terminalia, Isoberlinia doka and Anogeissus.

Subspecific endemism seen in the large mammals appears to link to Chari-Logone River system Pleistocene isolation. The park was also a stronghold for the now extinct Western Black Rhinoceros in the Central African Republic, but has been extinct in the country since 1986. One mammal is considered endangered, the Chadian wild dog, while the Sudan cheetah, Central African lion, and African manatee are classified as vulnerable. According to Spinage, antelope populations have declined markedly since 1960 within the park.

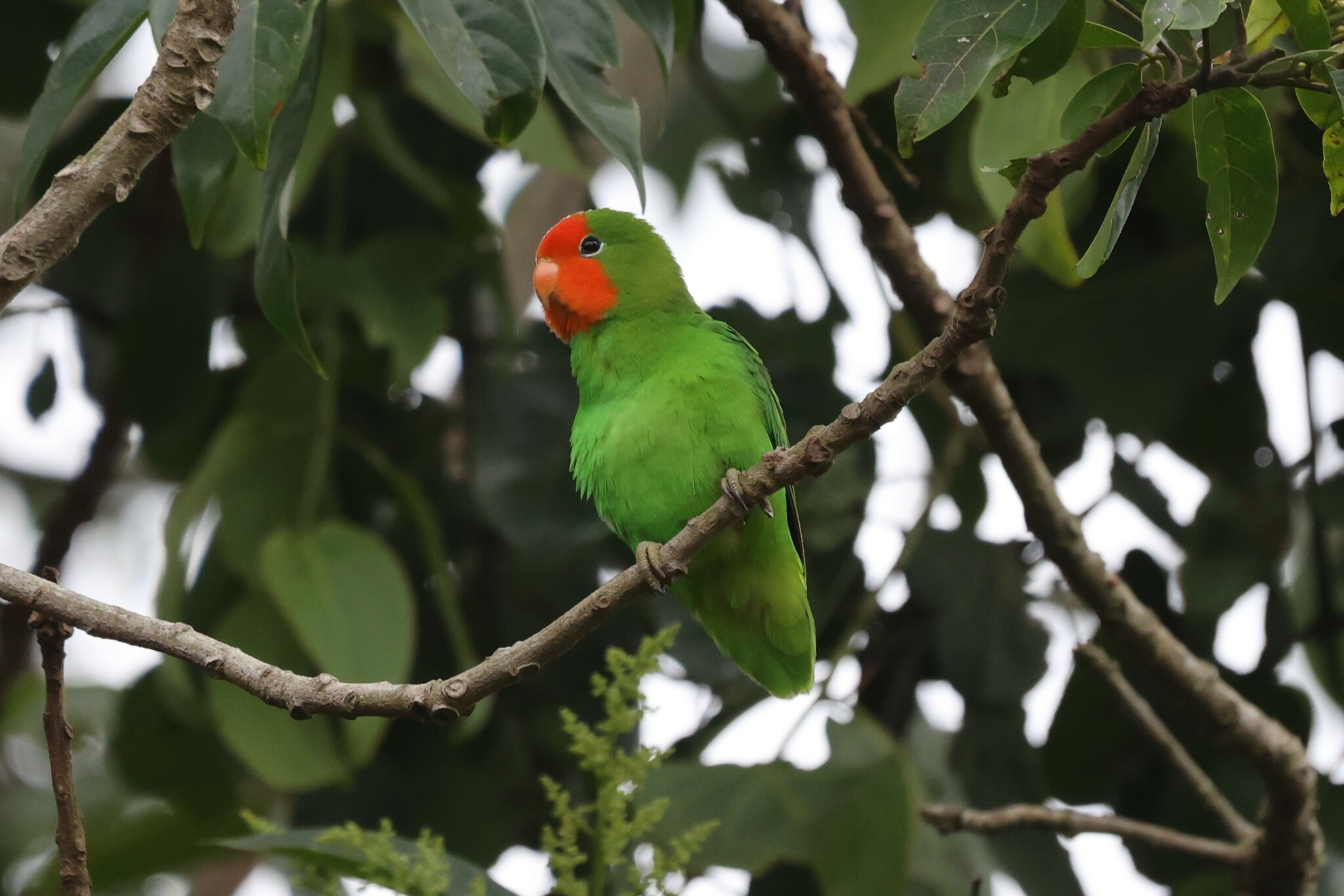
Red faced lovebird

The park has been designated an Important Bird Area (IBA) by BirdLife International because it supports significant populations of many bird species. The red faced lovebird is found here and in Nigeria's Gashaka Gumti National Park.

The park reserve's amphibians include the Mascarene ridged frog, sharp-nosed ridged frog, Schilluk ridged frog, Galam white-lipped frog, cryptic sand frog, ornate frog, crowned bullfrog, flat-backed toad, shovelnose frog, Senegal kassina, and Natal puddle frog.

=== Threats ===
Ecological threats to the park reserve include foreign timber and mining concessions, poaching and agricultural land-clearance.
