= Manovo-Gounda St. Floris National Park =

National Park in the Central African Republic

Manovo-Gounda St Floris National Park
- IUCN category II (national park)
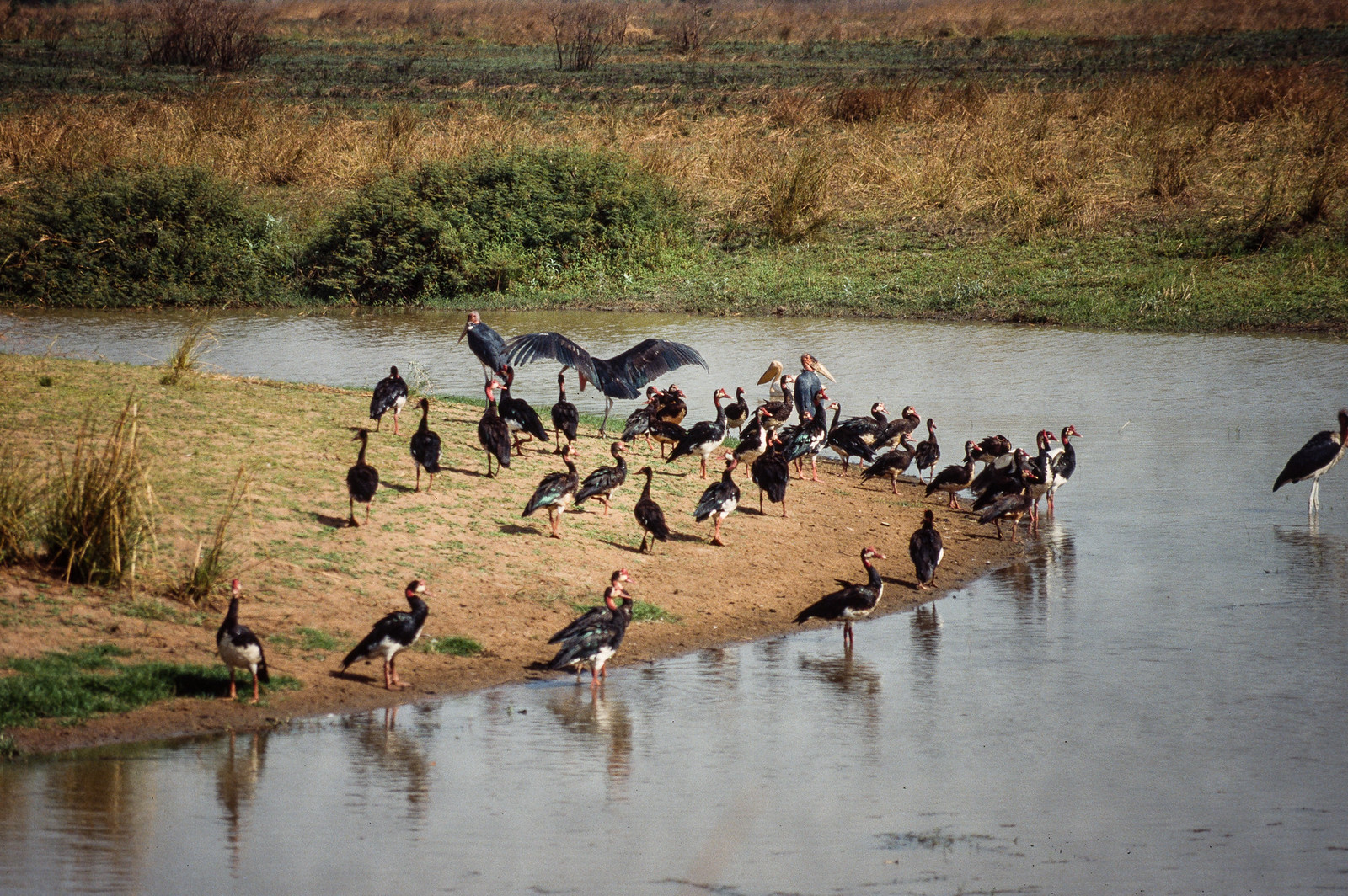
- The group of spur-winged goosees and marabou storks at river of park

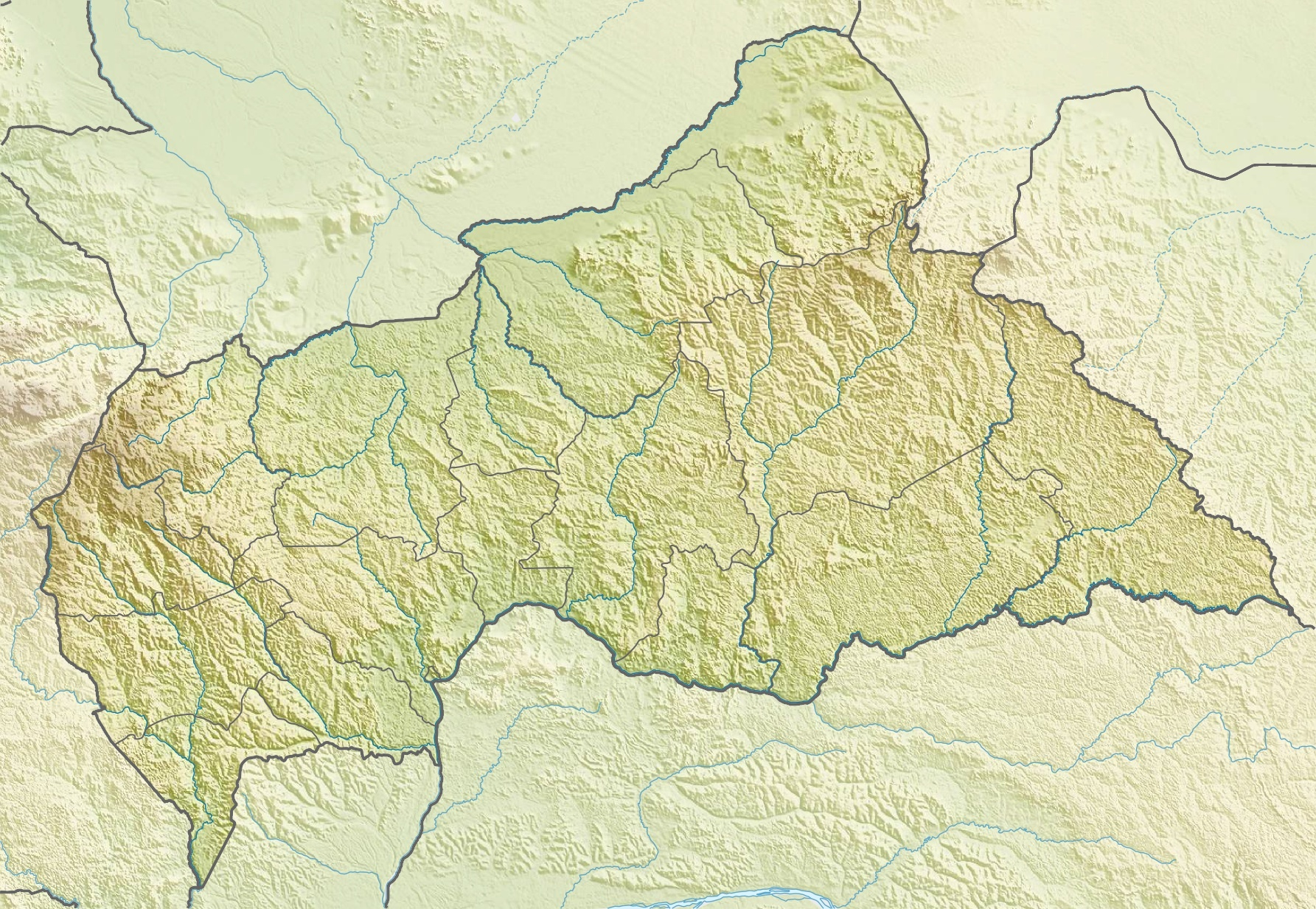
- Location within Central African Republic
- Location: Central African Republic
- Coordinates: 9°0′N 21°30′E
- Area: 17,400 km^{2} (6,700 sq mi)
- Established: 1979

UNESCO World Heritage Site
- Type: Natural
- Criteria: ix, x
- Designated: 1988 (12th session)
- Reference no.: 475
- Region: Africa
- Endangered: 1997–present

Manovo-Gounda St Floris National Park (French: Parc national du Manovo-Gounda St Floris) is a national park and UNESCO World Heritage Site located in the Central African Republic prefecture Bamingui-Bangoran, near the Chad border. It was inscribed to the list of World Heritage Sites in 1988 as a result of the diversity of life present within it.

== Geography and environment ==
The park occupies most of the eastern end of Bamingui-Bangoran province in the north of the country. The park's northern boundary is the international border with Chad on the Aouk (Bahr) and Kameur Rivers. The eastern border is the Vakaga River, the western border is the Manovo River about 40 km (25 mi) east of N'Délé, and the southern border is the ridge of the Massif des Bongo. The Ndéle-Birao road runs through the park.

=== Wildlife ===
Notable mammals include black rhinoceroses, African elephants, Sudan cheetahs, African leopards, red-fronted gazelles, African buffalos, Kordofan giraffes and West African lions.

The park has been designated an Important Bird Area (IBA) by BirdLife International because it supports significant populations of many bird species. A wide range of waterfowl species occurs on the northern floodplains.

=== Threats ===
The site is under threat due to its rare wildlife dying and animals species being wiped out. The western black rhinoceros that was indigenous to the Central African Republic has gone extinct in 2011. The site was added to the List of World Heritage in Danger after reports of illegal grazing and poaching by heavily armed hunters, who may have harvested as much as 80% of the park's wildlife. The shooting of four members of the park staff in early 1997 and a general state of deteriorating security brought all development projects and tourism to a halt.

The government of the Central African Republic proposed to assign site management responsibility to a private foundation. The preparation of a detailed state of conservation report and rehabilitation plan for the site was recommended by the World Heritage Committee at its 1998 session. People are working on breeding programs to revive the natural wildlife.

== See also ==
- World Heritage Sites in Danger
