= Zemongo Faunal Reserve =

Protected reserve of the Central African Republic

- IUCN category IV (habitat/species management area)
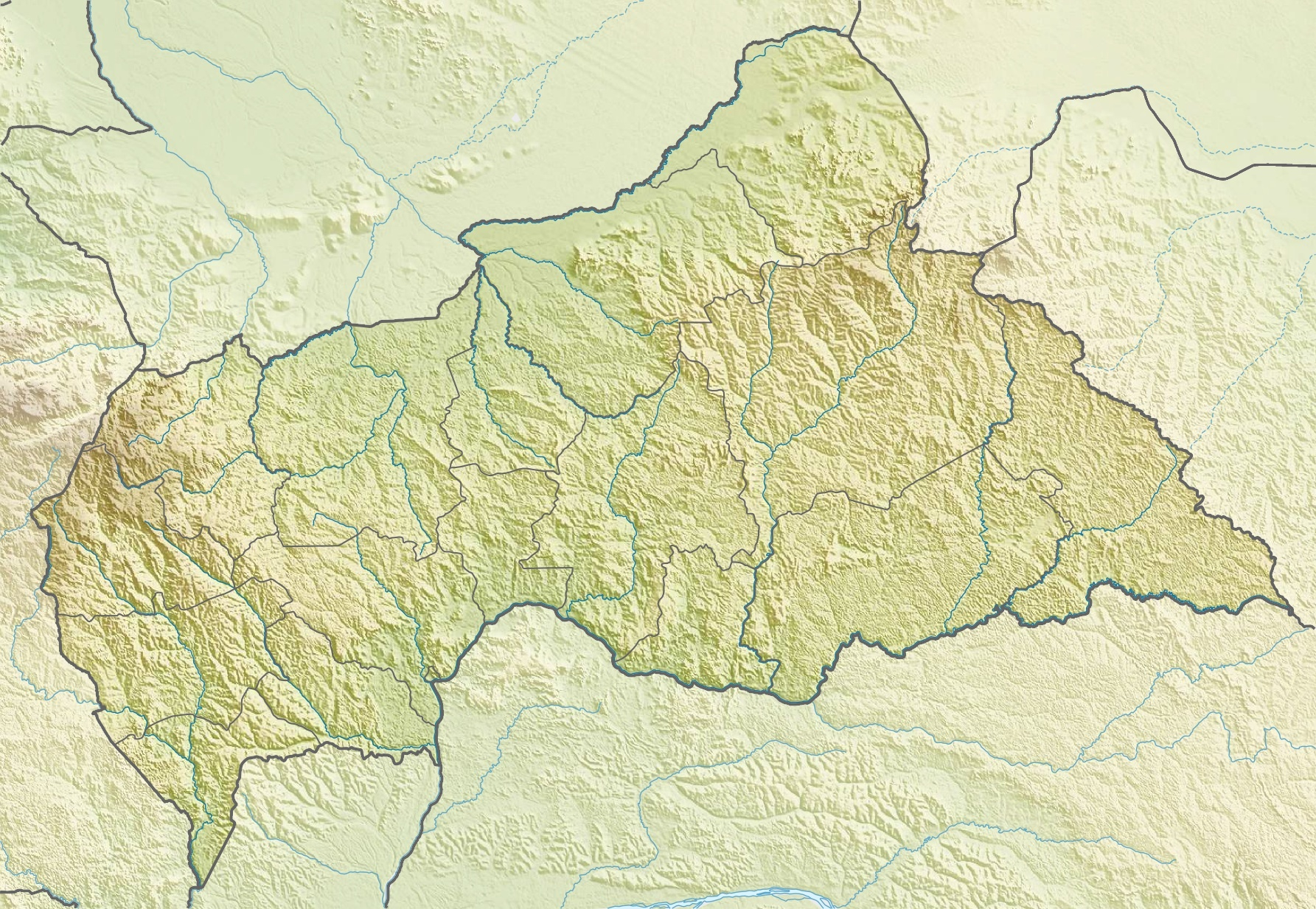
- Location within Central African Republic
- Location: Central African Republic
- Coordinates: 6.6°N 25.1°E
- Area: 10,100 km^{2} (3,900 mi^{2})
- Established: 1925

Zemongo Faunal Reserve is a protected reserve of the Central African Republic. Established in 1925, it was extended and redesignated in 1975, although still open to hunting in 1980.

== Geography and environment ==
The main rivers are the Vovado River and the Goangoa River, covering an area of 10,100 square kilometres (3,900 mi^{2}), of which 1,720 square kilometres (660 mi^{2}) is inundated forest.

=== Flora and fauna ===
The reserve contains dense Isoberlinia savanna woodland and gallery forests and supports eastern chimpanzees and other primate species. It formerly held a large elephant population and a diverse antelope community. It has been designated an Important Bird Area (IBA) by BirdLife International because it supports significant populations of many bird species.
