= Yata Ngaya Faunal Reserve =

Yata-Ngaya Faunal Reserve

The Yata-Ngaya Faunal Reserve is found in Central African Republic. It was established in 1960. This site is 4200km².
