= Elephant hunting in Chad =

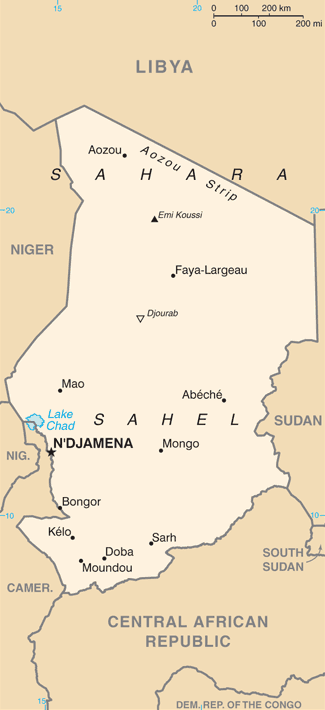
Map of Chad

Elephant hunting or elephant poaching and exploitation of their tusks for the ivory trade are illegal in Chad and pose a major threat to elephant populations. The profitable ivory industry is also a threat to the lives of rangers, even in the national parks, such as Zakouma National Park, the worst-affected area in terms of elephant poaching in Chad.

== History ==
Chad's elephant population was reduced to around 20,000 in the mid-1980s and was roughly 3,000 as of 2010, according to Stephanie Vergniault, head of SOS Elephants in Chad. The animals were subject to massacre by herds in and around the parks by organized poachers. The problem is worsened by the fact that the parks are understaffed and that a number of wardens have been murdered by poachers. Consequently, since the mid-1980s the elephant population has declined in the 20th century from 150,000 to a reported low of just 2,000 in the Chad-Cameroon region according to The Guardian. and 500 in Chad alone in 2013 according to the Born Free Foundation due to intense poaching. American journalist Lisa Ling has visited Chad to explore the country's elephant poaching problem and spoke at the University of Missouri–St. Louis.

In a July 2012 attack by mounted poachers near the SOS Elephants camp in the Chari-Baguirmi Region, 28 elephants were slaughtered and most of their tusks were removed. In another attack in September 2012, about 50 miles (80 km) from the boundaries of the Zakouma National Park, five rangers were killed; one is still missing and presumed dead. The Sudanese military have been blamed for the attacks and the slaughtering of elephants not only in Zakouma and elsewhere in Chad, but also in other African nations, including Cameroon. As of 2012, a small team was responsible for battling to protect the remaining 450 elephants in Zakouma. One of the worst massacres took place in 14–15 March 2013 when 89 elephants, including 33 pregnant females and 15 calves, were slaughtered by poachers near the town of Gamba.

== Conservation efforts ==
Stephanie Vergniault, a French lawyer, screenwriter, and conservationist who has been working in Chad since 2009, founded the SOS Elephants organization to protect the elephant population. In an interview in 2010, Vergniault stated that the population of elephants in Chad had declined by 85 percent in the previous three decades, and that if the same rate of poaching continues, "not a single elephant" would be alive in Chad within three years.

== Elephant Poaching in Chad ==
In Chad there are elephants that are being poached in 2006 there were 3,800 but in 2009 there were just over 600 elephants. All of the elephants that are in Chad were being poached for ivory. But Chad got a multi-million-euro conservation project for this park, so some have thought these elephants are safe. In Chad there are new reports of elephants are experiencing a new epidemic of poaching; there will be new results and analyses coming out of Central Africa. Elephants are mostly getting poached in the dry season. In Chad, they have Zakouma National Park saves elephants getting poached.

== See also ==
- Elephant hunting in Kenya
- Hunting license
