= Streptomyces gamaensis =

Scientific classification
- Domain: Bacteria
- Kingdom: Bacillati
- Phylum: Actinomycetota
- Class: Actinomycetia
- Order: Streptomycetales
- Family: Streptomycetaceae
- Genus: Streptomyces
- Species: S. gamaensis

Binomial name
- Streptomyces gamaensis Zhao et al. 2017

Type strain
- CGMCC 4.7304, DSM 101531, NEAU-Gz11

Species of bacterium

Streptomyces gamaensis is a bacterium species from the genus of Streptomyces which has been isolated from soil from Gama in Chad. Streptomyces gamaensis has an antifungal activity.

== See also ==
- List of Streptomyces species
