= Elephant hunting in Kenya =

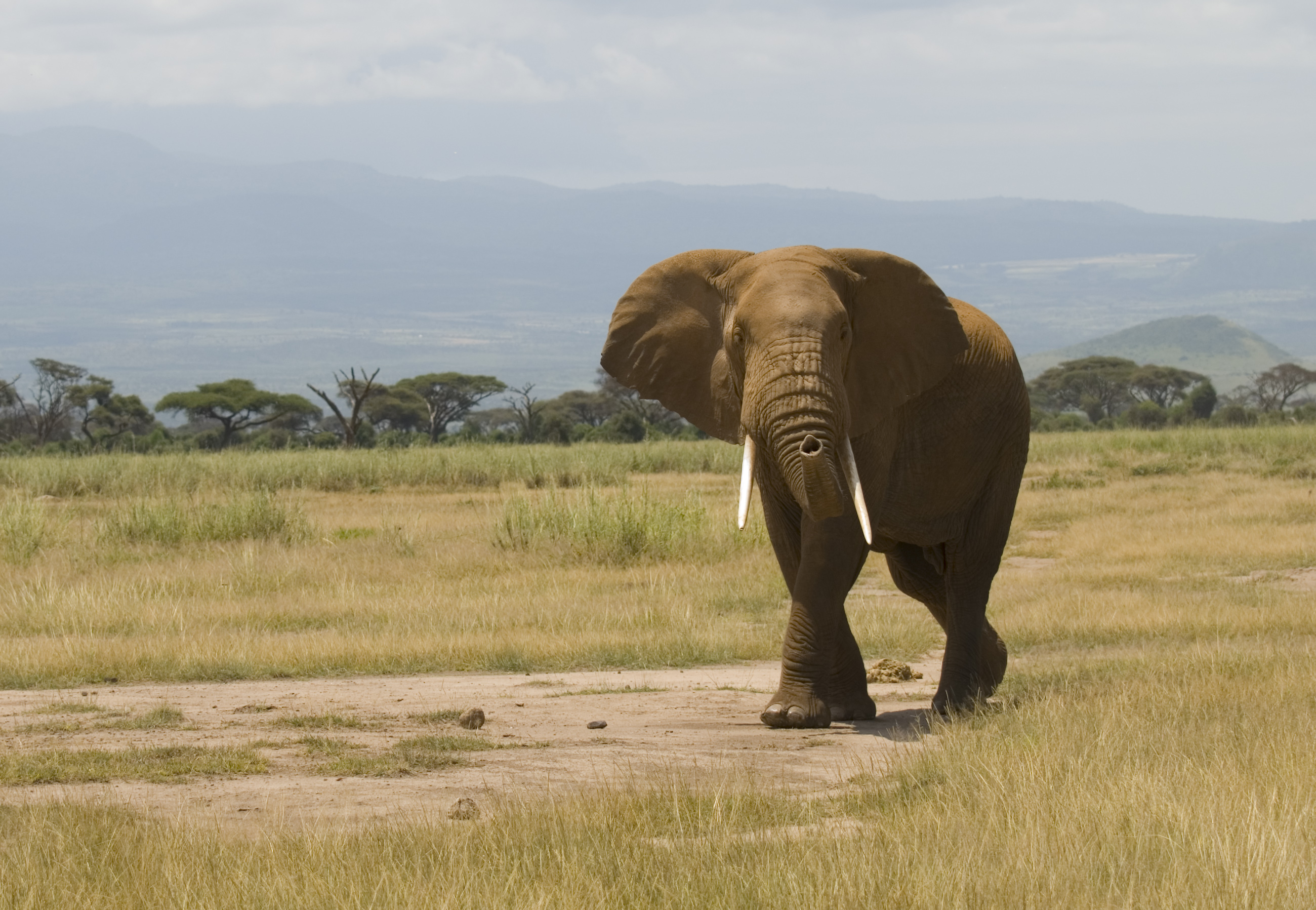
An African elephant in Amboseli National Park, Kenya

Elephant hunting, which used to be an accepted activity in Kenya, was banned in 1973, as was the ivory trade. Kenya pioneered the destruction of ivory as a way to combat this black market.

== History ==
=== Colonial Kenya ===
During colonial times, elephant hunting in Kenya was seen as a sport for noblemen and was exploited by the colonial governors. British East Africa was not unique in this: big-game hunting was popular in many parts of the Empire.

Among the white hunters, the bull elephant was said to be the most exhilarating target. Small-bore rifles appeared to be the preferred option and aiming at the brain instead of the heart was another preference. The motive was not always monetary. However, many hunters were indiscriminate in their choice of elephants to kill – young, old, male or female, it did not matter, as the primary purpose was ivory to sell and elephant meat to feed their hunting party.

The East African Professional Hunter's Association was formed to regulate the industry and restrict its excesses. The Association, which came into being at the Norfolk Hotel, Nairobi, stemmed from a desire to regulate hunting in the wake of technological developments like the safari vehicle, which had made accessing remote hunting areas much easier. During its existence it was able to accomplish much to conserve East African wildlife and become perhaps one of the most respected societies in the world of its kind.

One of the most prolific of the white hunters was the Scottish adventurer W. D. M. Bell, who is reported to have killed over a thousand elephants, spread across several African countries. See the first of his memoirs, The Wanderings of an Elephant Hunter (1923), for more information. Some of the madness of the desire to shoot an elephant (albeit not in Kenya) is shown in White Hunter Black Heart, a fictionalised version of what happened during the filming of the Hollywood classic African Queen.

In 1963, the first year of independence, the Kenyan government issued 393 permits (hunting licenses) for elephants.

In the 1950s and 1960s, the Kenyan poacher received approximately Shs. 3-4/lb ($.79–1.05/kg); by the 1970s, it was Shs. 100/kg ($12.74/kg), increasing the black market value for the primary producer from about one-fifth to one-third of the real value.

=== Ban, and ivory smuggling ===
According to the American hunter Craig Boddington, elephant hunting was made illegal in Kenya in 1973 and all animal hunting without a permit in 1977. By the late 1970s, the elephant population was estimated around 275,000, dropping to 20,000 in 1989. Between 1970 and 1977, Kenya lost more than half of its elephants.

In the 1970s, Ngina Kenyatta ("Mama Ngina"), wife of then-President Jomo Kenyatta, and other high-level government officials were allegedly involved in an ivory-smuggling ring that transported tusks out of the country in the state private aeroplane. New Scientist claimed that there was now documentary proof that at least one member of "Kenya's royal family" (the Kenyatta) had shipped over six tons of ivory to China. During the 1970s, 1900 elephants were killed in Kenya for their ivory tusks, increasing to 8300 elephants in the 1980s.

=== Worldwide ban on ivory trade ===
In 1989, as a dramatic gesture to persuade the world to halt the ivory trade, President Daniel arap Moi ignited twelve tons of elephant tusks. In the 1990s the widespread ban on commercial ivory trading reduced the industry to a fraction of what it had been and elephant populations have stabilised. But illegal poaching and sale on the black market still poses a serious threat, as does government bribery. The largest poaching incident in Kenya since the ivory trade ban occurred in March 2002, when a family of ten elephants was killed.

Illegal elephant deaths decreased between 1990, when the CITES ban was issued, and 1997, when only 34 were illegally killed. Ivory seizures rose dramatically since 2006 with many illegal exports going to Asia. Poaching spiked seven-fold between 2007 and 2010.

Large scale tourism promotion picked up in Kenya following the imposed hunting ban in Kenya since 1977. It has been noted that "photographic tourism", or non-consumptive wildlife use, is contributing 12% of Kenya's GDP. Hence, some groups have recommended that tourism be promoted rather than any kind of hunting or consumptive wildlife use, as it could divert the attention of the government of Kenya from the policy goal of wildlife preservation.

=== Current situation, including safari tourism ===
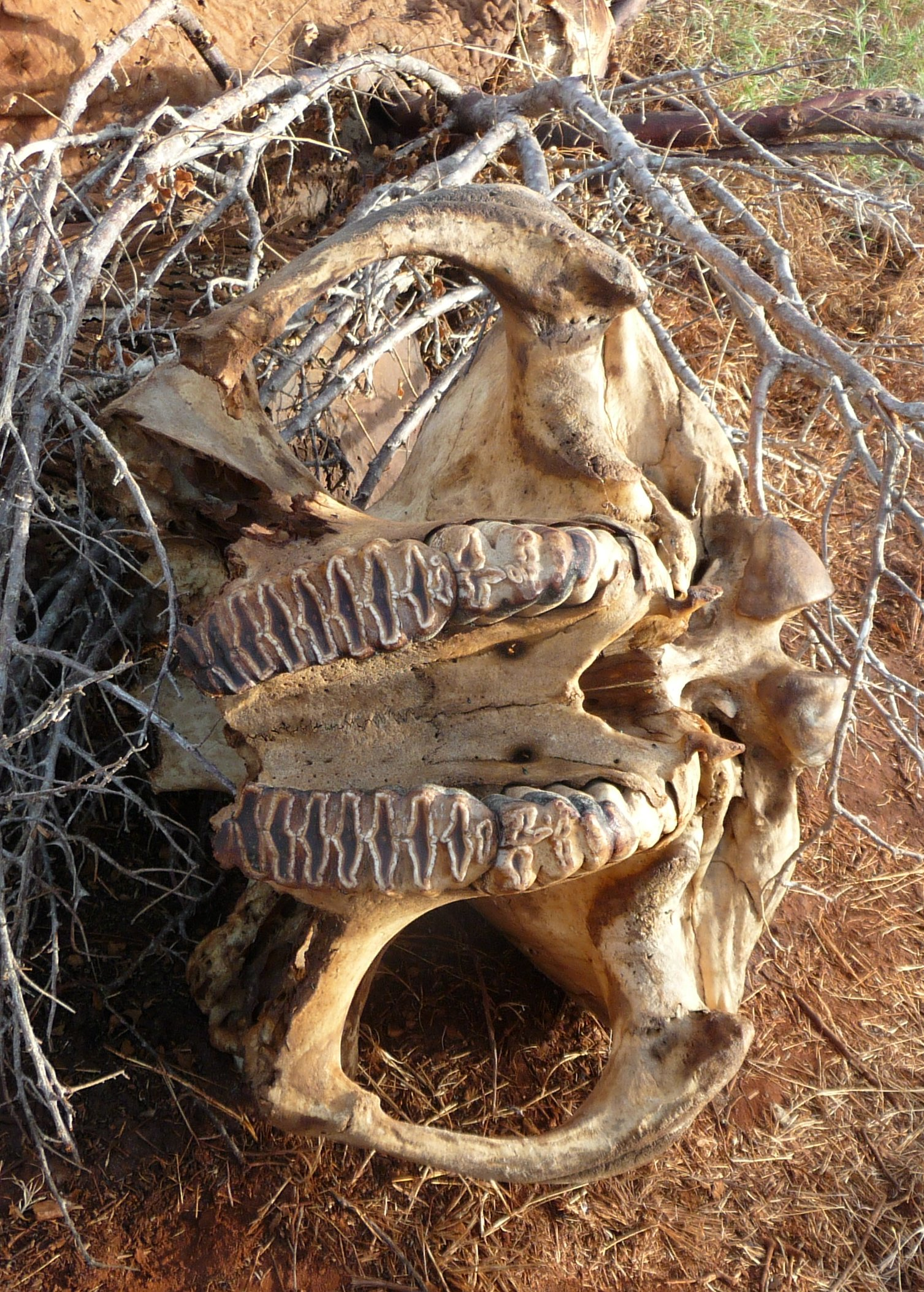
An elephant skull with tusk removed by poachers near Voi, Taita-Taveta District

Although elephant hunting has been banned for more than 40 years in Kenya, poaching has not been eradicated completely given the poverty of many Kenyans and the high value of elephant tusks. Tusks traditionally were shipped overseas and sold on the black market.

Arrests continue at Nairobi's international airport, where 92 kilos of raw ivory were seized in 2010, and 96 kilos in 2011.

== Possible trophy hunting in the future ==
Trophy hunting, purely as sport and as a conservation action, is now being considered for adoption in Kenya, as such a programme appears to have yielded positive results in Namibia and South Africa under a programme titled "Community-Based Natural Resource Management" (CBNRM). Under this programme, while cash was offered as an incentive for sport hunting, the basic aim was wildlife control on the communal land, providing benefits to the community as a whole.

The Food and Agriculture Organization's (FAO) report states: "Trophy hunting is generally self-regulating because low off-take is required to ensure high trophy quality and marketability in future seasons. Trophy hunting creates crucial financial incentives for the development and/or retention of wildlife as a land use over large areas in Africa, including in areas where ecotourism is not viable. Hunting plays an important role in the rehabilitation of degraded wildlife areas by enabling the income generation from wildlife without affecting population growth of trophy species."

The policy of trophy hunting has been adopted in 23 sub-Saharan African countries. The income generated in total in Africa is quoted to be US$201 million/year, derived from about 18,500 international hunting clients covering an area of 1.4 million km^{2}. Since there is a lack of consensus among the clients about the efficacy of this method of biodiversity conservation in Africa, a study carried out by the Africa Wildlife Conservation Fund indicates that if Kenya makes trophy hunting legal again, nearly 90% of the clients would be interested in pursuing this activity in that country. In this context, the importance of effective regulation of hunting operators and clients has also been highlighted.

== See also ==
- Elephant hunting in Chad
- Environmental issues in Kenya
