= Luca Berardi =

Kenyan-Italian child TV host and musician

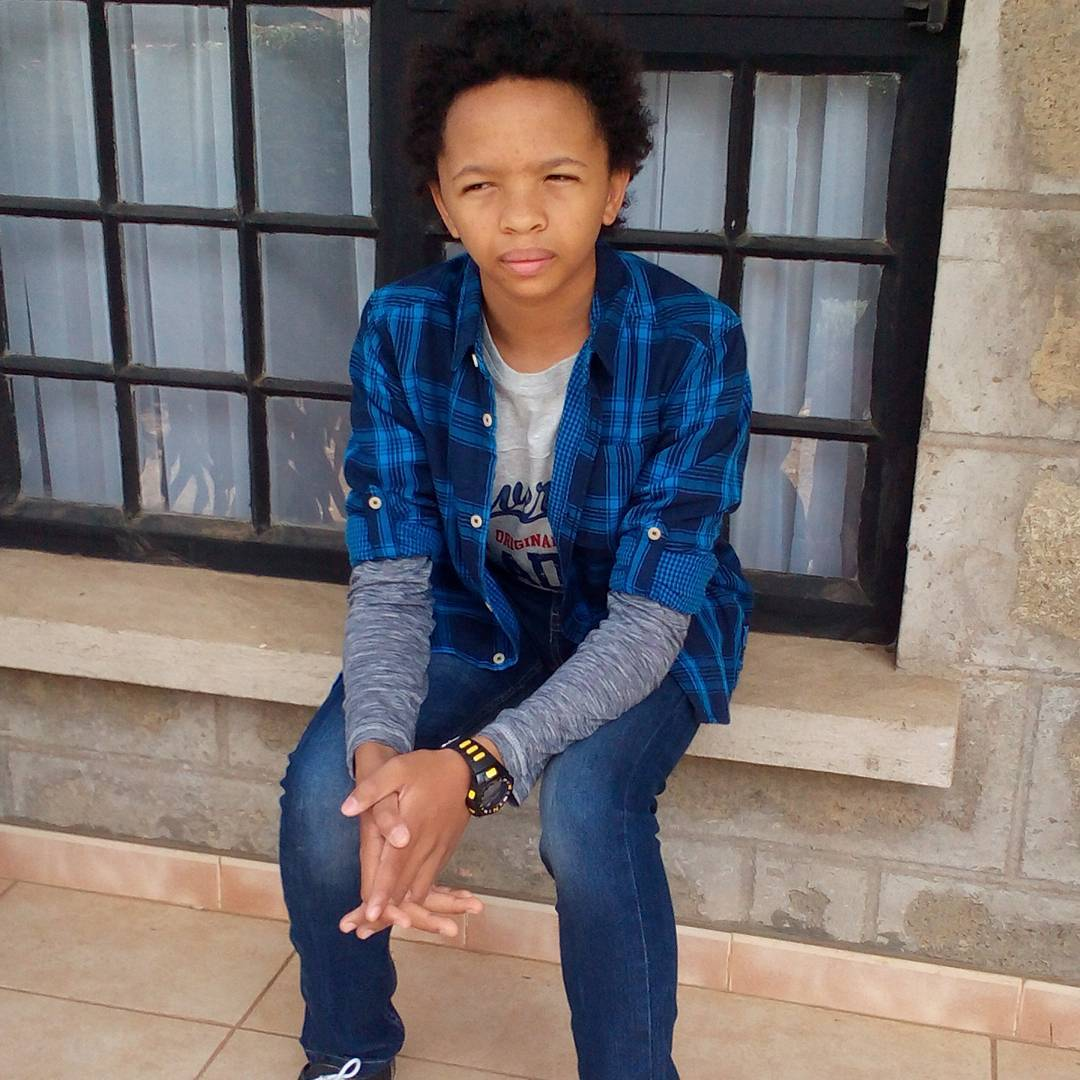
- Born: May 24, 2003 (age 23); Forli, Italy
- Education: NIS (Nairobi, Kenya), ISLK and Katedralskolan (Lund, Sweden), University of Malmö (Malmö, Sweden)
- Occupations: Singer, TV host, environmental conservationist
- Years active: 2012–present

Luca Berardi's work as an environmental activist started at an early age in Kenya (he is of Kenyan-Italian descent) where he became well-known in the mid-2010s as a singer and TV child celebrity.

At 8 years of age, he founded and was the CEO of Young Animal Rescue Heroes (YARH), an organisation whose self-declared aim was to "create awareness for endangered wildlife and environmental conservation". In that capacity, he visited schools and gave speeches (including a TEDx talk, in 2015) to raise awareness on conservation.

He was an invited guest to the 2016 ivory burn at Nairobi National Park, the largest official destruction of ivory recorded to date.

Berardi co-hosted a children's programme, Big Minds, which aired on KBC from July 2014 to July 2016.

He has recorded and released four songs, including the single A Better Place. He performed another song he wrote, Money Can, at the Children and Youth Finance conference held at the Headquarters of the United Nations in 2014.

After moving to Sweden for family reasons in 2017, Berardi was awarded the Environmental Award of Lund's Municipality and the Young Environmental Hero of the Year award by the WWF Sweden in 2018 for his work with YARH.

Currently a Masters' student in Sustainable Development, he continues his conservation work with podcasts/online seminars, as an iNaturalist ambassador and as a Board Member of the Nordic Youth Biodiversity Network (NYBN).
