= Environmental issues in Kenya =

Environmental issues in Kenya have become a growing concern amid population growth, urbanization, and economic development, placing pressure on the country's natural resources. Kenya's main challenges include deforestation, water resource degradation, wildlife poaching, flooding, and waste management systems. Oftentimes, these issues are interconnected and are mainly influenced by climate change, which has contributed to varying weather patterns and environmental stress across the country.

These challenges are most seen in rapidly growing urban areas, where resource management systems and infrastructure have struggled to keep pace with demand. However, pressures on natural ecosystems and biodiversity continue to raise environmental and economic concerns.

== Water resources ==
Water resources in Kenya are under pressure from agricultural chemicals and urban and industrial wastes, as well as from use for hydroelectric power. The anticipated water shortage is a potential problem for the future. For example, the damming of the Omo river by the Gilgel Gibe III Dam together with the plan to use 30% to 50% of the water for sugar plantations will create significant environmental problems. Up to 50% of Lake Turkana's water capacity will be lost. Had there been no planning of the irrigation of sugar plantations, the dam itself might have had a net positive effect to the environment, due to the emission-less power generation of the dam.

Water-quality in Kenya's major lakes, (including water hyacinth infestation in Lake Victoria and rising phytoplankton production in Lake Naivasha), have contributed to a substantial decline in fishing output and put many species of fish at risk of endangerment.

== Animal poaching ==
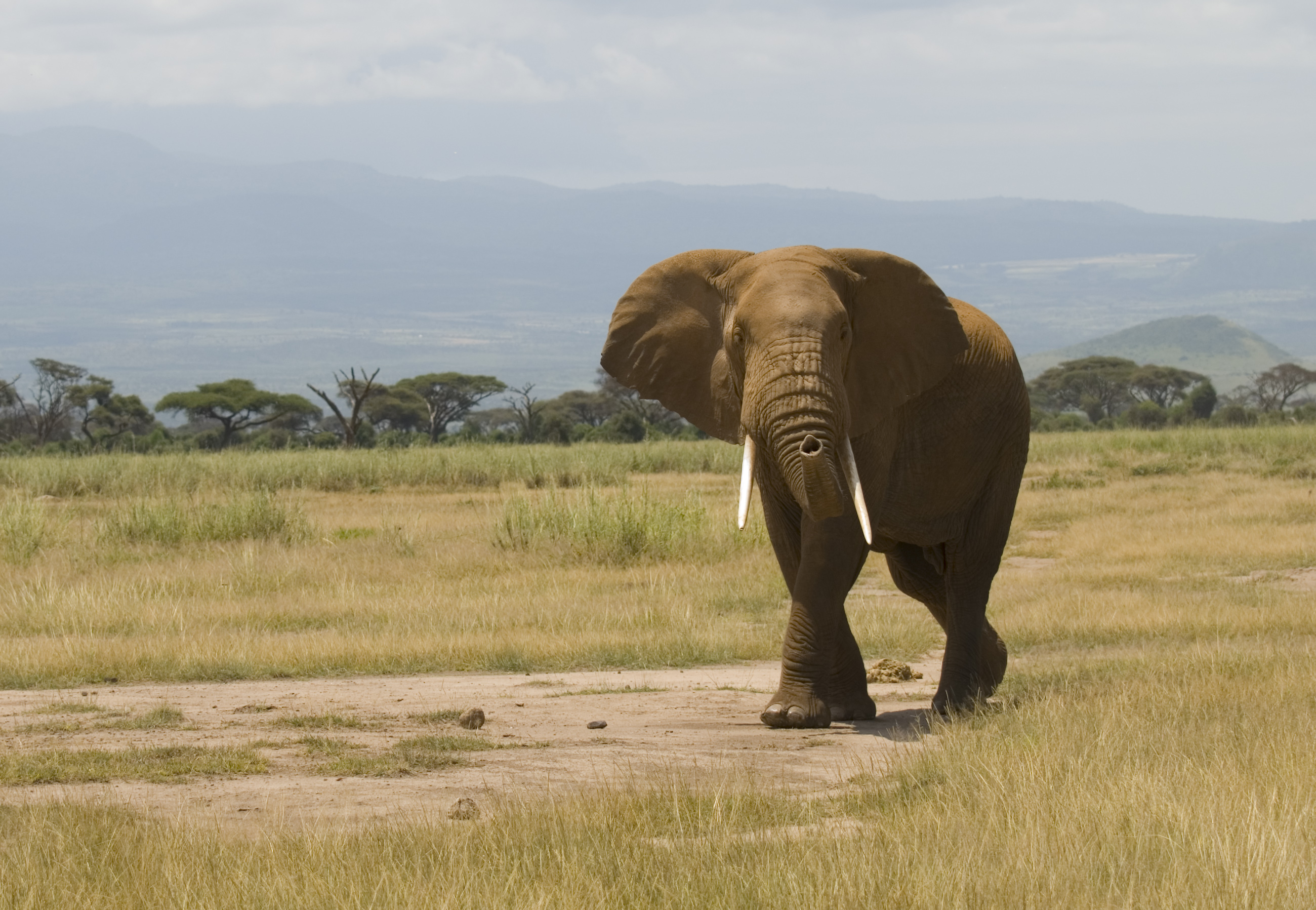
An African elephant in Amboseli National Park, Kenya.

There are a wide variety of wildlife species in Kenya, whose habitats are threatened by encroachment of human development and destruction. In rural Kenya, poachers are one of the main threats to early Kenyan wildlife conservation. Michael Werikhe, also known as Rhino Man, made huge contributions to early Kenyan wildlife conservation. Werikhe walked thousands of kilometres and raised millions of dollars to fund the White Rhino conservation projects. The Blue Wildebeest population is currently abundant, but like other more endangered species, they feel the pressure of habitat reduction. Other wildlife facing threats to poaching and trophy hunting include lions, elephants, gazelles, and rhinos. In February 2020, poachers in Kenya killed two white giraffes. The female white giraffe and her calf were found dead in Garissa County, in the North-East part of the country. There now remains only one male, white giraffe left in the world. Other critically endangered species in Kenya include the Tana River Mangabey, Black Rhino, Hirola, Sable Antelope, and Roan Antelope. These animals have valued meat, hide, or horns/ivory that make them likely to be poached. It is referred to bushmeat trading, which the increase is caused by an increase in population, food insecurity and poverty.

=== Laws, regulation, and deterrence ===
During Kenya's colonial era (1895–1963), elephant and rhino hunting was viewed as an elite sport by British colonizers. Post-independent Kenya saw a decrease in over half of the elephant population during the period of 1970 to 1977, even though the country banned elephant hunting in 1973. In 1977, the hunting of all animals was banned in Kenya. The Kenya Wildlife Service was then established in 1989. The state corporation responded to high levels of poaching, insecurity in the conservation and wildlife parks, and inefficiency and low morale within Kenya's game department. The international ban on the trade in ivory was implemented through the Convention on International Trade in Endangered Species of Wild Fauna and Flora (CITES). This law contributed to a significant but temporary decline in elephant poaching, which facilitated population rehabilitation. Wildlife poaching and trafficking re-emerged in the 2000s due to increased demands of ivory and rhino horns, posing threats to extinction in the near future. The Kenyan Wildlife service works closely with Kenyan law enforcement agencies. However, some argue that conservation efforts should not be solved by what is called green militarization, where conservation efforts and policies are aided by increased policing and criminalization. On the other hand, there may be circumstances in which militarization is a necessary measure. In any case, scholars and policy-makers are interested in considering the effects of green washing policies in conservation and militarization.

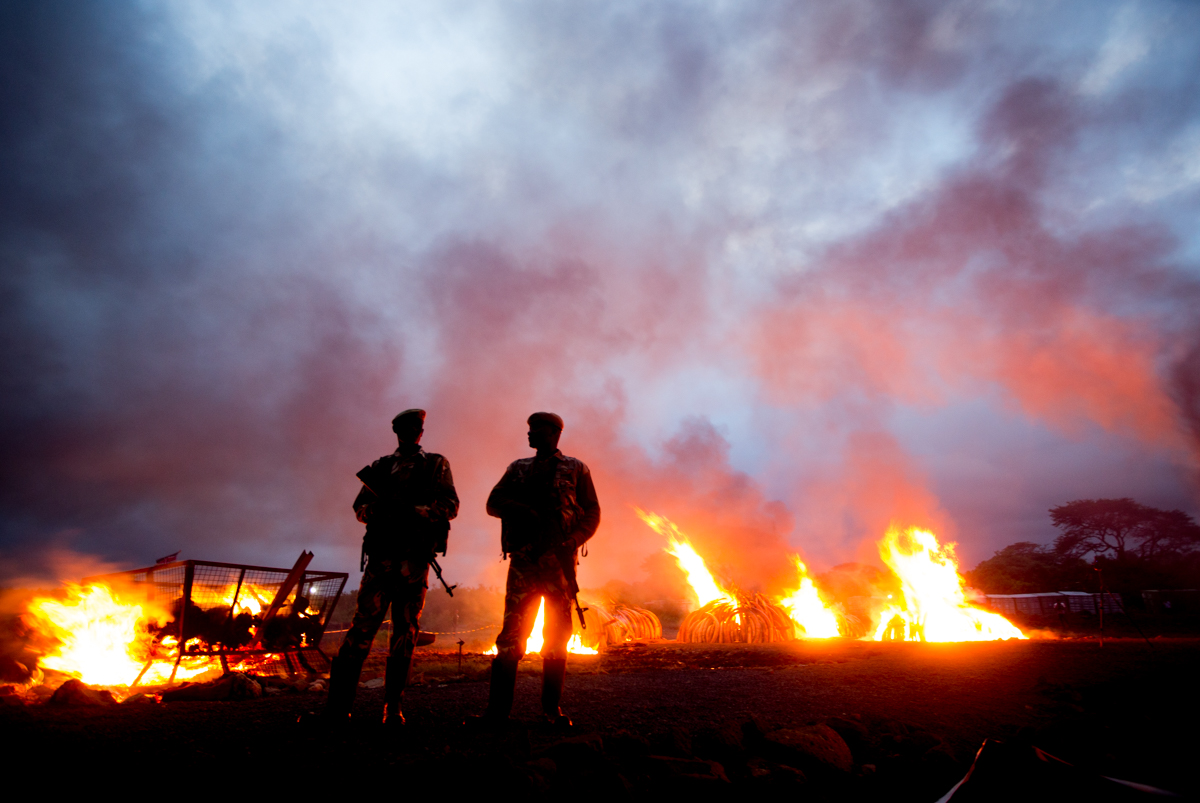
Public ivory burning in Nairobi in 2016.

Ivory burning is a public event meant to deter animal poaching. Kenya was the first to burn ivory in 1989, then destroyed the largest amount in 2016 (105 tonnes).

=== Incentives ===
Language and rhetoric from the media on "the war on poaching" can be dehumanizing and does not provide the full picture. The reality is that many Kenyans who face poor living conditions, live in informal housing settlements, and struggle to make a liveable income, turn to poaching. Aside from financial incentives, some of the main drivers for poaching are reported to be related to class, gender inequity, and uneven development across Kenya. These poor conditions can be attributed to Kenya's colonial history.

=== Illegal markets and corruption ===
Elephant tusks and rhino horns have high value on illegal markets. Although Kenya has many national parks and reserves protecting wildlife--elephant and rhino populations are still at risk. These threats of endangerment may be attributed to corruption within the Kenyan government and military. An independent study investigating 743 cases between January 2008 and June 2013 reveal that those found guilty of wildlife crime were rarely getting substantially fined. In many cases, corrupt government officials help poachers and trophy hunters for bribes.

Although all animal hunting was banned in Kenya in 1977, trophy hunting is still allowed--for a high price. Proponents of trophy hunting in Kenya argue that the profits support conservation efforts, and that the killing of animals by humans will not decrease since many encroach on human settlements. It is also argued that trophy hunting should not be banned, but rather reformed, because the animals will otherwise attack humans. However, there is insufficient data to assess whether trophy hunting correlates to a decrease in animal attacks on humans.

This problem is worsened by corruption and some officials supplementing their income by permitting poaching. In The Big Conservation Lie, John Mbaria and Mordecai Ogada wrote that the main problem of the crisis are not poachers, but the alienation of local people from wildlife conservation. In fact, conservation is deeply rooted in the country's coloniality. National parks were established and built for recreational purposes for the European settlers, thereby excluding locals. Today, local populations are still being displaced from their lands through the creation of wildlife parks and conservation areas. About 20% of Kenya's land are in Protected Areas (PAs), which are largely run by non-Indigenous Kenyans who earn immense profits from eco-tourism. Very little of the earnings (less than $5000 USD per year) from eco-tourism go to Kenyans working in hospitality services or as wildlife rangers.

Recently, as animal byproduct sales on the illegal markets increase at a high annual growth rate, new challenges arise in wildlife protection. Controversy over the construction of the Mombasa-Nairobi Standard Gauge Railway project, constructed by the China Road and Bridge Corporation (CRBC), prompted the Chinese contractors to initiate wildlife protection efforts.

== Deforestation ==
Forestry output has also declined because of resource degradation. Overexploitation over the past three decades has reduced the country's timber resources by one-half. At present only 3% of the land remains forested, and an estimated 50 square kilometres of forest are lost each year. This loss of forest aggravates erosion, the silting of dams and flooding, and the loss of biodiversity. In response to ecological disruption, activists have pressed with some success for policies that encourage sustainable resource use.

The 2004 Nobel Peace Prize went to the Kenyan environmentalist, Wangari Maathai, best known for organizing a grassroots movement in which thousands of people were mobilized over the years to plant 30 million trees in Kenya and elsewhere and to protest forest clearance for luxury development. Imprisoned as an opponent of Moi, Maathai linked deforestation with the plight of rural women, who are forced to spend untold hours in search of scarce firewood and water.

Widespread poverty in many parts of the country has greatly lead to over-exploitation of the limited resources in Kenya. Cutting down of trees to create more land for cultivation, charcoal burning business, quarrying among other social and occupational practices are the major threats of environmental degradation due to poverty in rural Kenya. Regions like Murang'a, Bondo and Meru are affected by this environmental issue.

Kenya had a 2018 Forest Landscape Integrity Index mean score of 4.2/10, ranking it 133rd globally out of 172 countries.

== Littering and solid waste collection ==
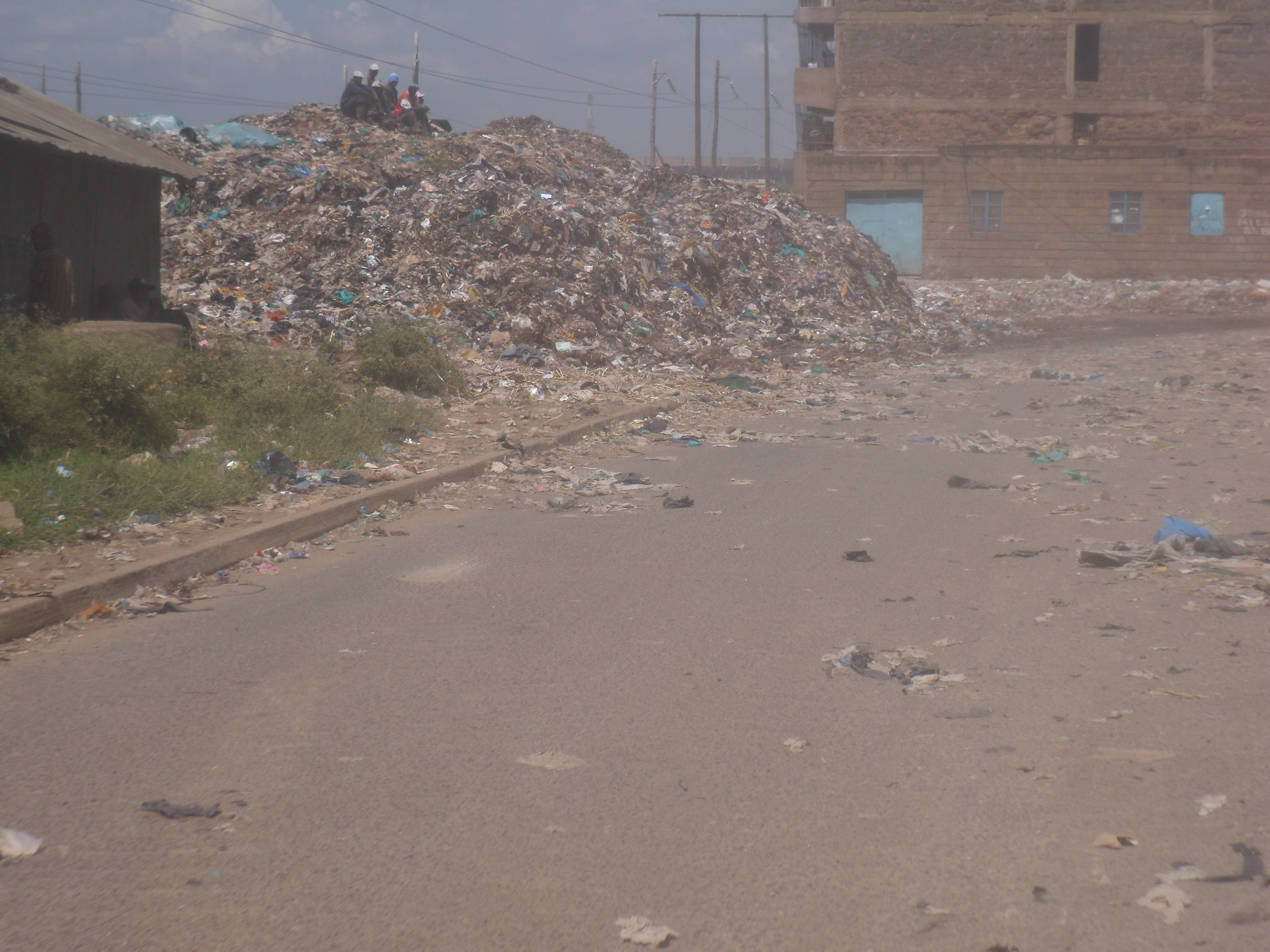
Collected solid waste that has spilled onto a road.

Littering and illegal dumping are widespread issues in both urban and rural settings in Kenya, with a general lack of infrastructure to maintain consistency in waste collection and management. In most urban centers, only fractions of total waste is collected by government entities, with the rest being disposed of by residents through open dumping and burning. Eldoret, the fastest growing city in Kenya, has experienced issues in its waste management infrastructure, including improper dumping, difficulty in accessing households, and delays in waste collection. Additional obstacles include a willingness among residents to participate in sustainable practices for household waste such as separating waste for collection rather than burning it.

Solid waste management in Kenya is governed by the country's Sustainable Waste Management Act of 2022, which proposed a framework to manage Kenya's waste. However, lack of enforcement mechanisms and low levels of resources have posed obstacles in implementation. In addition to municipal solid waste, electronic waste (e-waste) has emerged as a growing concern due to increased consumption of electronic devices and changing waste streams. A significant amount of e-waste is handled informally with only a limited share processed through recycling systems.

== Flooding ==
There is the risk of seasonal flooding during July to late August months. In September 2012, thousands of people were displaced in parts of Kenya's Rift Valley Province as floodwaters submerged houses and schools and destroyed crops. It was especially dangerous as the floods caused latrines to overflow, contaminating numerous water sources. The floods can also cause mudslides and two children were killed in September 2012 following a mudslide in the Baringo District, which also displaced 46 families.

In addition to seasonal change, flooding has intensified in rapidly urbanizing cities like Nairobi, Mombasa, and Kisumu. The use of impermeable surfaces in urban development causes a reduction in natural water absorption and increase in flood risk. During March and April of 2024, a flash flood disaster in Nairobi and broader East Africa resulted in 294 casualties and displaced 101,132 individuals.

== Climate change ==
Köppen climate classification map for Kenya for 1980–2016

2071–2100 map under the most intense climate change scenario. Mid-range scenarios are currently considered more likely.

Climate change is posing an increasing threat to global socioeconomic development and environmental sustainability. Developing countries with low adaptive capacity and high vulnerability to the phenomenon are disproportionately affected. Climate change in Kenya is increasingly impacting the lives of Kenya's citizens and the environment. Climate change has led to more frequent extreme weather events like droughts which last longer than usual, irregular and unpredictable rainfall, flooding and increasing temperatures.

The effects of these climatic changes have made already existing challenges with water security, food security and economic growth even more difficult. Harvests and agricultural production which account for about 33% of total Gross Domestic Product (GDP) are also at risk. The increased temperatures, rainfall variability in arid and semi-arid areas, and strong winds associated with tropical cyclones have combined to create favourable conditions for the breeding and migration of pests. An increase in temperature of up to 2.5 °C by 2050 is predicted to increase the frequency of extreme events such as floods and droughts.

Hot and dry conditions in Arid and Semi-Arid Lands (ASALs) make droughts or flooding brought on by extreme weather changes even more dangerous. Coastal communities are already experiencing sea level rise and associated challenges such as saltwater intrusion. Lake Victoria, Lake Turkana and other lakes have significantly increased in size between 2010 and 2020 flooding lakeside communities., wo

The annual fossil fuel carbon dioxide emissions, in million metric tons of carbon, for a variety of non-overlapping regions covering the Earth

== Sustainability and Conservation Efforts ==
According to the progress report for Kenya Vision 2030, Kenya continues to make advancements in wildlife conservation and management through recent deployment of anti-poaching technologies, securing land for national parks, and rehabilitating/constructing fences along park edges. Further efforts to combat deforestation include restoring over 148,000 acres of damaged forests and protecting over 6 million acres of forest through close monitoring of human activity.

Multiple projects were undertaken during 2022 to 2023 in to increase water visibility and storage, including the construction of the Idhidho Dam in Marsabit, Thwake Dam in Makueni, Karemenu Dam in Kiambu, as well as over 20 small dams. According to the Kenyan Ministry of Water, Sanitation, and Irrigation, the Thwake Dam is anticipated to supply water to over 1.3 million citizens and irrigate over 90,000 acres of land.. Kenya also works to improve the availability of water and sanitation services by constructing multiple water supply and sewerage systems in urban areas. Additionally, large-scale rehabilitation of water-supplies, bore-hole drilling, and water provision to schools and health centers were completed and commissioned.
