= Destruction of ivory =

Used to deter the poaching of elephants

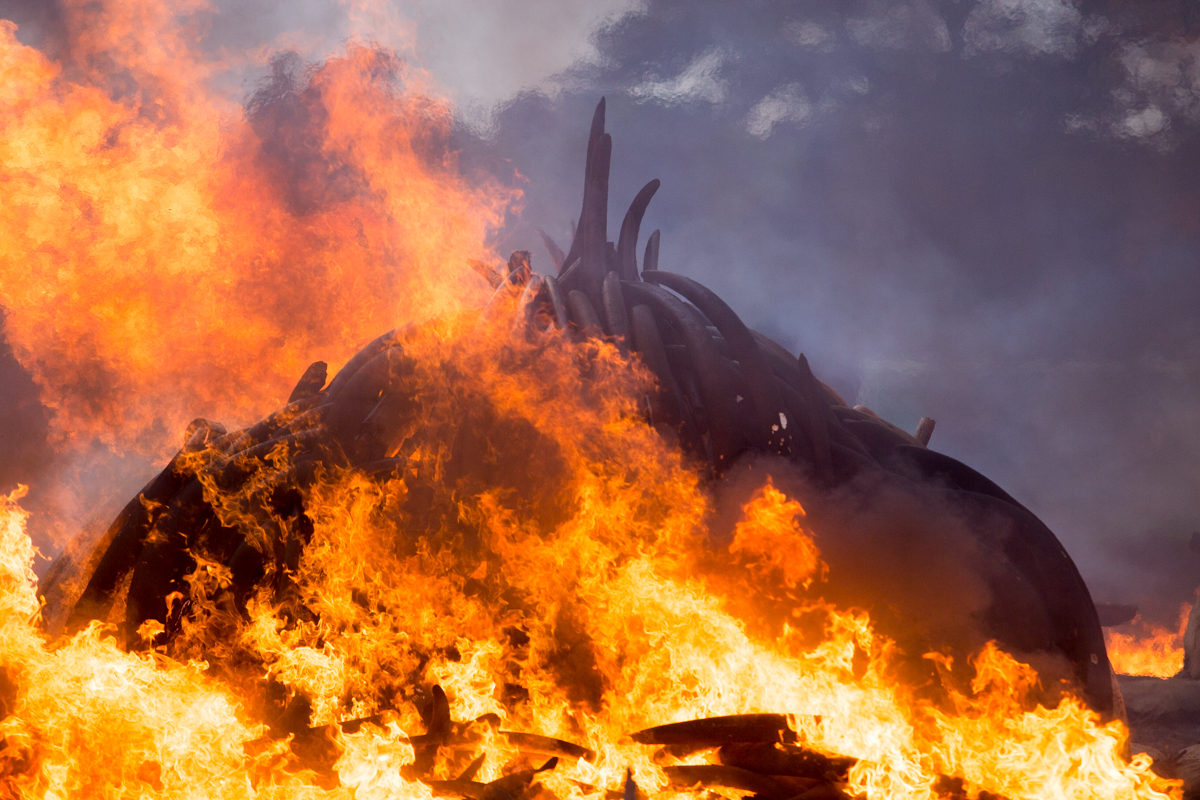
A stack of elephant tusks burning in Kenya in April 2016

The destruction of ivory is a technique used by governments and conservation groups to deter the poaching of elephants for their tusks and to suppress the illegal ivory trade. As of 2016, more than 263 tonnes (580,000 lb) of ivory have been destroyed, typically by burning or crushing, in these high-profile events in 21 countries around the world. Kenya held the first event in 1989, as well as the largest event in 2016, when a total of 105 tonnes (231,000 lb) of ivory were incinerated.

The conservationists, governments, and non-governmental organizations that endorse the strategy argue that it fosters public support for the protection of elephants and that it sends a message to poachers their work is futile. Critics contend that the technique may increase poaching by creating a perception of scarcity that increases ivory's value on the black market, and that evidence for the technique's effectiveness is insufficient to justify the opportunity cost for countries struggling with poverty.

== Background ==
Archaeological findings show human use of ivory to date back more than 35,000 years. It has been exported to Europe since at least Classical antiquity, but exporting accelerated during the Age of Exploration and colonisation of Africa. At its peak, at the end of the 19th century and early 20th century, with the rise of mass production, well over 1,000 stone (6.4 t) of ivory were exported to Europe yearly. In the last quarter of the 19th century, the city of Sheffield, England alone imported 180 stone (1.1 t) just for cutlery handles. In the 1970s, Japan became the largest consumer of ivory, accounting for about 40% of all trade worldwide, with Hong Kong acting as the largest trade hub.

Hunting for ivory is responsible for significant reductions in elephant populations in several parts of Africa. Between 1979 and 1989, the African elephant population decreased from 1.3 million to 600,000. Ivory became a billion-dollar market, with about 80% of the supply taken from illegally killed elephants. As of 2014, according to a report by the Wildlife Conservation Society, about 96 African elephants are killed for their tusks every day.

In 1986, CITES (the Convention on International Trade in Endangered Species of Wild Fauna and Flora) introduced a control system based on permits, registration, stockpiles, and monitoring. Shortly thereafter, the CITES Secretariat weakened regulations, effectively legalizing stockpiles of poached ivory. For example, countries such as Burundi and Singapore, which were not home to wild elephants, registered 89.5 stone (0.568 t) and 297 stone (1.89 t) of trafficked ivory, respectively. As uncovered by the Environmental Investigation Agency, the "control system" turned out to be easy to manipulate, ultimately increasing the value of ivory and empowering smugglers. At the October 1989 CITES convention in Geneva, representatives from Tanzania proposed an effective ban on the international ivory trade. After heated debates, the ban was enacted, and went into effect in January 1990.

The ban proved effective for about a decade, and saw rising elephant populations, but starting in 1997 CITES began granting exceptions to the ban to allow countries such as Zimbabwe, Botswana, and Namibia to sell a limited amount of ivory, as well as an exception to Japan to buy a limited amount, based on each country's declared confidence in their effective regulation and control. From 1998 to 2011, other countries were granted exceptions and illegal trafficking at least tripled. The majority of ivory in the 21st century has gone to growing Asian markets, including and especially China, where the material has been viewed as a status symbol sometimes known as "white gold". In 2015, Chinese officials expressed their intent to phase out the country's involvement with the ivory trade. Prices fell by nearly half in the year prior to a 2016 report, and at the end of that year China's State Council declared its intent to halt ivory-related commerce by the end of March 2017.

== History and events ==
=== Kenya and the first fires ===
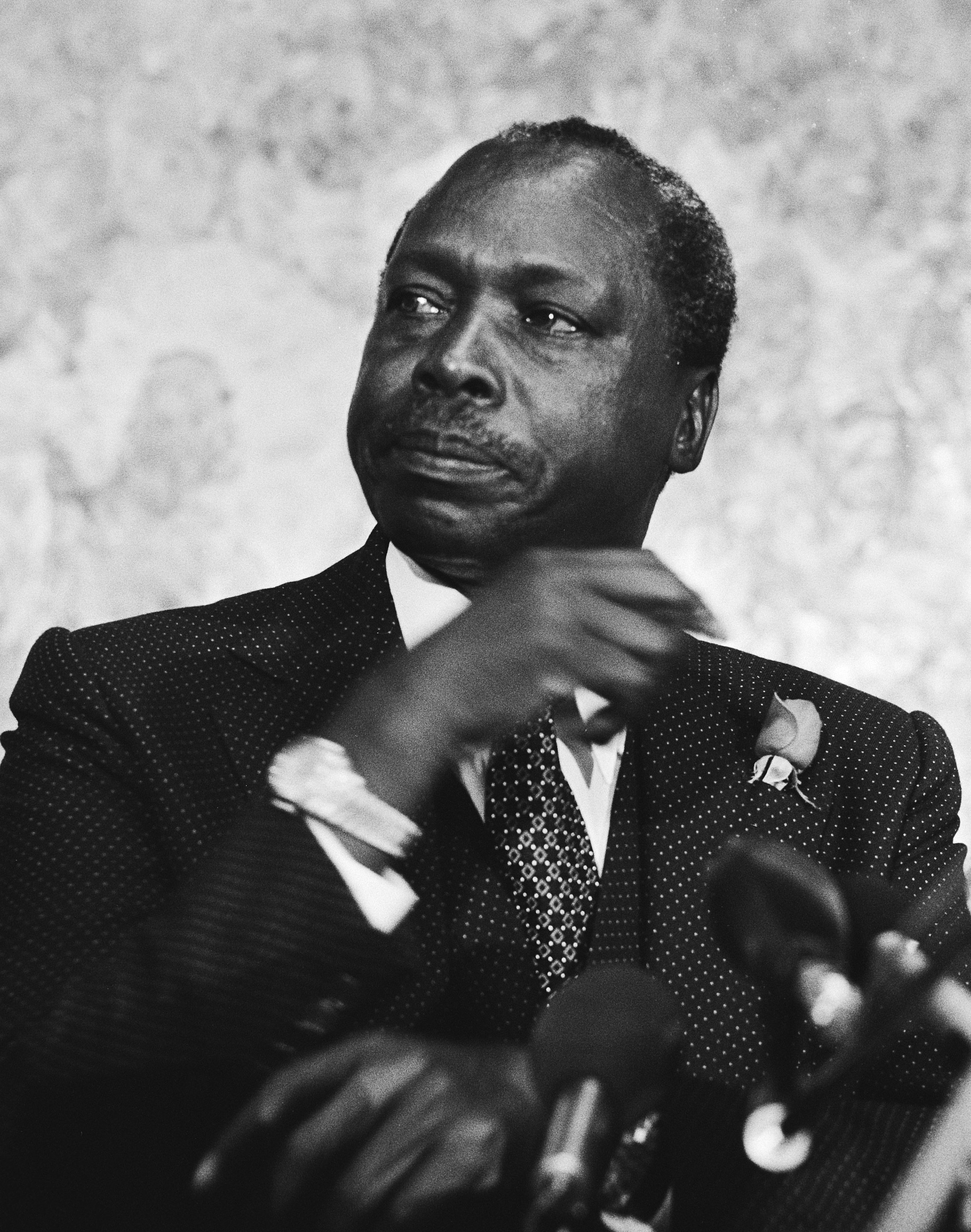
Daniel arap Moi in 1979

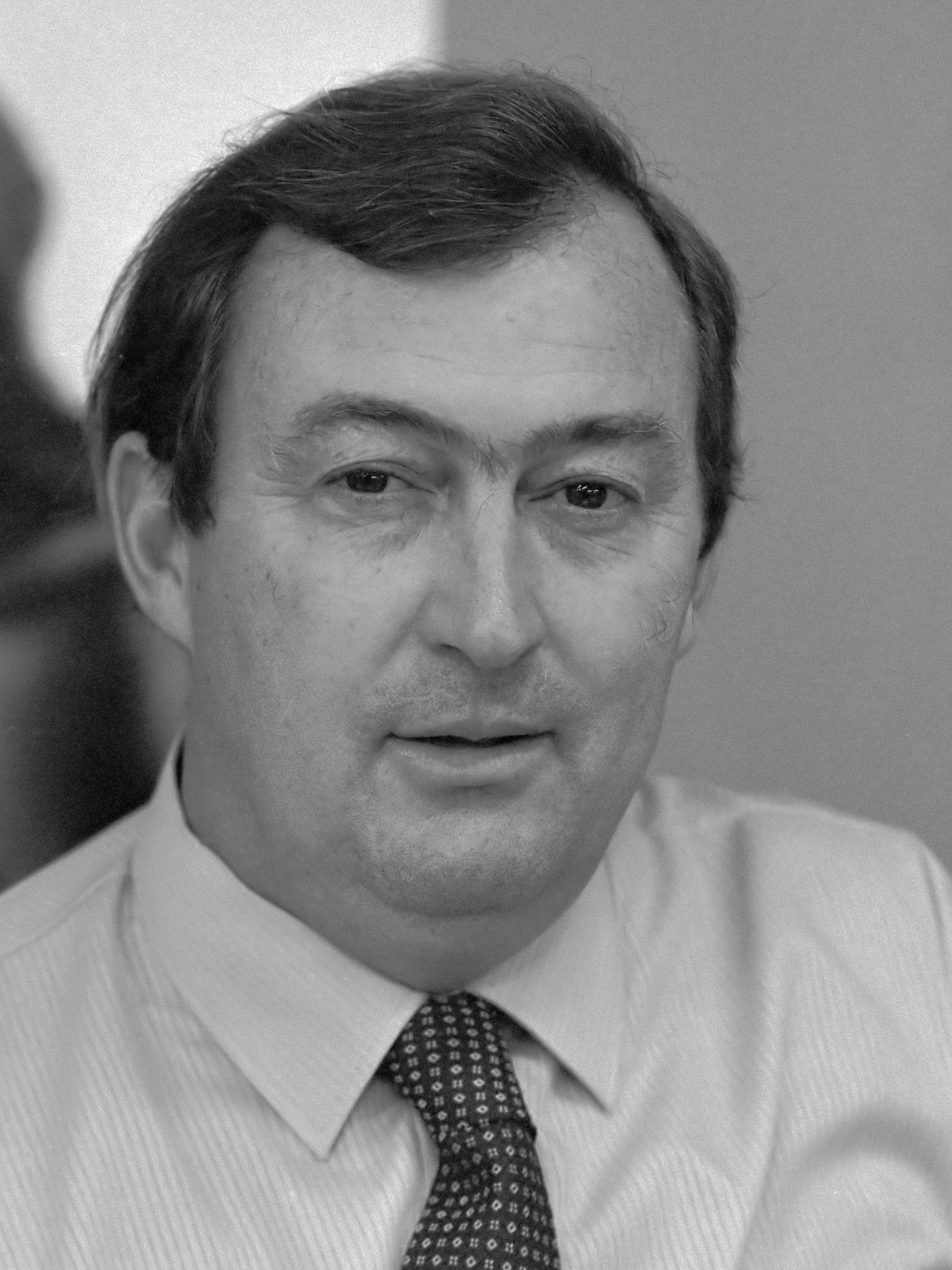
Richard Leakey in 1986

In 1989 Richard Leakey, a paleoanthropologist and conservationist from the prominent Leakey family, was named head of Kenya's Wildlife Conservation and Management Department, the forerunner to today's Kenya Wildlife Service. Elephant hunting had been banned in 1973, but the ivory trade remained legal. By the 1980s, elephant poaching had become widespread due to the increasing price of ivory. In a May 1989 article, The New York Times described Tsavo National Park as "an elephant graveyard – piles of bleached white elephant bones – instead of an elephant habitat". Kenyan officials knew the value of the elephant to safari tourism, and wanted to persuade CITES to include the animal on its global endangered species list at its October 1989 meeting.

When Leakey took the position, the organization had 12 tons of confiscated illegal ivory in its possession, which he was urged to sell in order to fund conservation efforts. Instead, he piled all of it together and, with Kenyan President Daniel arap Moi, set it on fire. Ivory does not easily burn, but the choice to use fire rather than other means to destroy it was intentional as Leakey wanted the event to produce powerful images for the global media. To make the destruction spectacular, Leakey worked with a Hollywood special effects professional to devise an innovative pyrotechnics technique using jet fuel and flammable glue.

It was a successful publicity stunt, attracting international attention from the press while the fire burned for three days. It also proved influential among conservationists, encouraging others to dispose of their stockpiles in a similar manner and leading, in part, to the international ban on the ivory trade passed at CITES. Paul Udoto of the Kenya Wildlife Service called it a "desperate measure meant to send a message to the world about the destruction through poaching of Kenya's elephants."

Kenya has held two more ivory burns since 1989. The second was just two years later in 1991, destroying 6.8 tons. Kenyan President Mwai Kibaki held the country's third event in 2011, destroying another five tons of ivory.

==== Largest fire ====
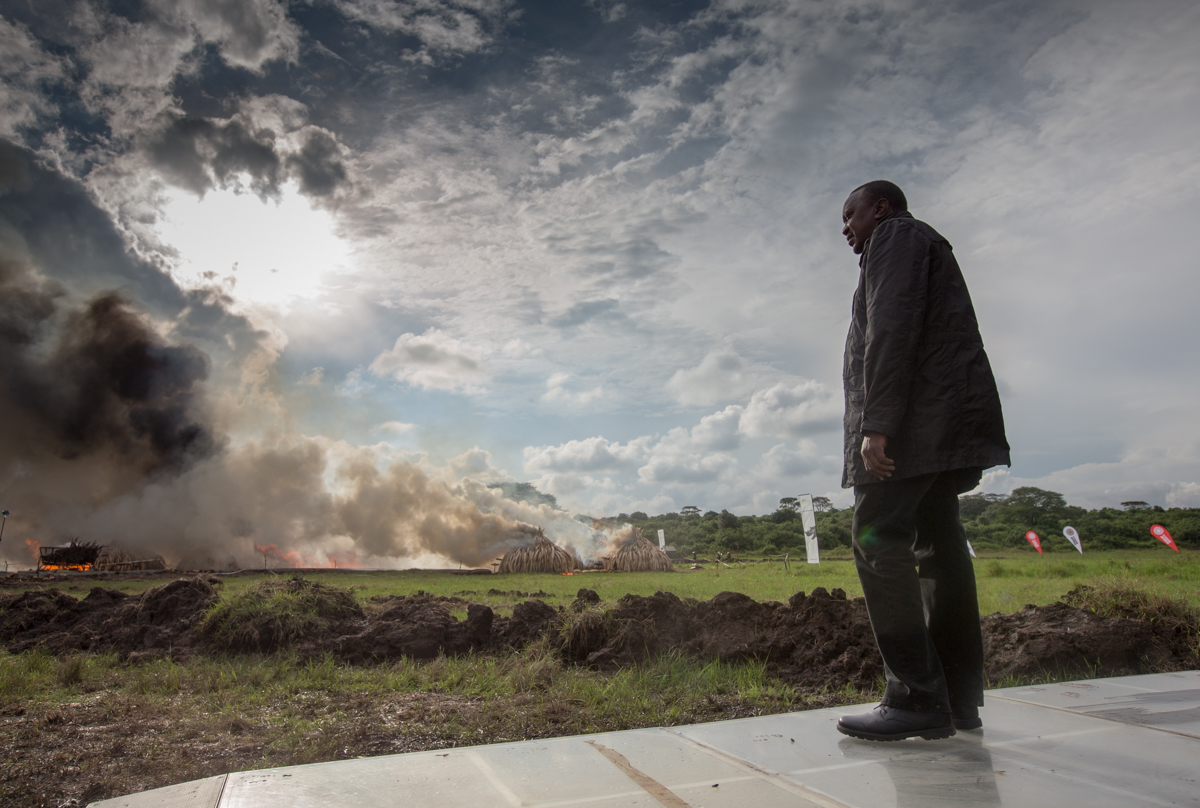
Kenyan President Uhuru Kenyatta watching 105 tons of ivory burn in April 2016

On 30 April 2016, Kenyan President Uhuru Kenyatta set alight the largest ever pile of ivory for destruction in the Nairobi National Park. The pile consisted of 105 tonnes of elephant ivory from about 8,000 elephants and 1.35 tonnes of horns from 343 rhinoceroses. Estimates for the total black market value of the destroyed contraband range from $150 million to $220 million. The ivory was transported to the site in shipping containers then stacked into towers up to 10 ft (3.0 m) tall and 20 ft (6.1 m) in diameter. The ivory towers took personnel from the Kenya Wildlife Service ten days to build. The pyre also contained exotic animal skins. The amount of ivory destroyed equaled about 5% of the global stock. Gabonese President Ali Bongo Ondimba was also in attendance.

=== More frequent events across four continents ===
As of 2016, more than 263 tonnes (580,000 lb) of ivory has been destroyed in high-profile events in 21 countries around the world. Much of this is due to the help of the Elephant Protection Initiative (EPI), which aids countries in burning their ivory stockpiles. The EPI was launched by the governments of Botswana, Chad, Ethiopia, Gabon and Tanzania in 2014.

- United Arab Emirates and Zambia: The first countries to follow Kenya's lead were the United Arab Emirates and Zambia in 1992, destroying 12 and 9.5 tons, respectively.
- Gabon: In 2012, Gabon burned the tusks and carved ivory it had been confiscating since 1985, adding up to about 4.8 tons.
- Philippines: The Philippines, a country which the CITES Standing Committee noted as one of the major consumers of ivory in 2012, became the first such nation to destroy its holdings in June 2013. The Department of Environment and Natural Resources, the division coordinating the destruction, had planned to hold a "ceremonial burning", but environmental objections to the idea of legitimated open burning led them to instead crush all five tons by first running over them with a road roller, then pounding them with the bucket of a backhoe, and finally taking the bits that remained to an incinerator.

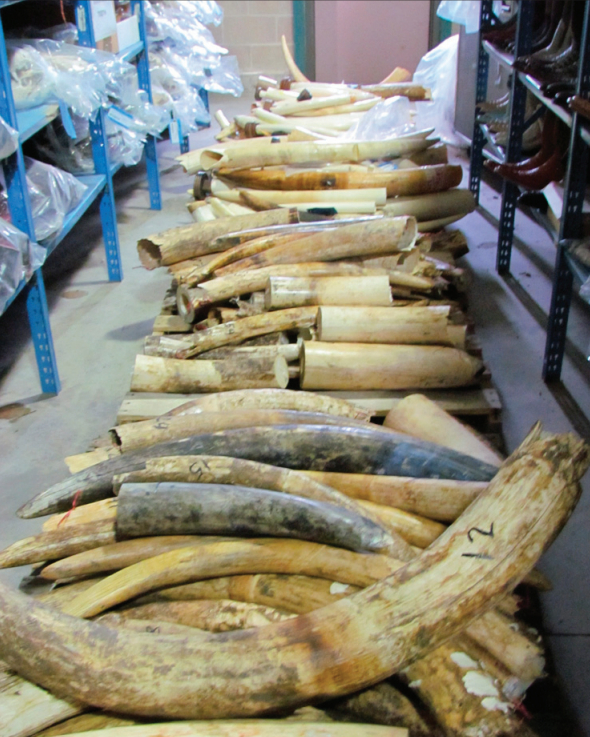
A pallet of seized raw ivory prior to being crushed by the US Fish & Wildlife Service in November 2013

- United States: In November 2013, the United States employed an industrial rock crusher to pulverize six tons of amassed ivory. Although the US does not ban the domestic sale of ivory, it is illegal to bring ivory into the country. Its interest in destroying its ivory was also connected to research that found links between the ivory trade and threats to national security through terrorism and organized crime. The US government and American non-governmental organizations have been involved in multiple forms of anti-poaching measures, largely in Africa, and American diplomats are actively engaging other governments to take part in eroding the ivory market by destroying stockpiles. Another ivory crush took place in New York City's Times Square in June 2015.
- China: China is the world's largest consumer of ivory, accounting for 70% of global demand as of 2014. Many of the countries that have destroyed their ivory accumulated the stockpiles because of their location on the trade route between Africa and China. Given its prominent role in the market, China's decision to crush 6.1 tons of ivory in January 2014 was a major cause for celebration among conservationists.
- France: France was the first European country to destroy its three tons of seized illegal ivory in February 2014, with tusks fed one-by-one along with other ivory goods into a pulverizer.
- Hong Kong: In May 2014, Hong Kong began a systematic destruction of its 28-ton stockpile, which was scheduled to take place over the course of two years. In its announcement of the destruction, Hong Kong's Endangered Species Advisory Committee chairman, Wong Kam-sing, explained that, moving forward, "any future forfeiture of ivory will be similarly disposed of on a regular basis". Although the sale of ivory has not been banned entirely in Hong Kong, the commitment and actions it has taken are significant not just for being the largest stockpile destroyed to-date, but also because it has been the world's largest ivory market.

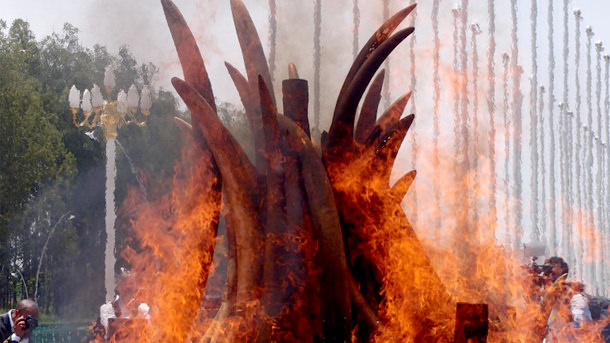
Ivory burning in Brazzaville, Republic of Congo, in April 2015

- Chad: 1.1 tons destroyed of ivory in 2014.
- Belgium: 1.5 tons of ivory destroyed in 2014.
- Ethiopia: In Ethiopia, where the size of the elephant population has decreased by 90% since the 1980s, officials issued a National Ivory Action Plan to address poaching and ivory trafficking. Among other strategies, the Plan includes the publicized destruction of seized ivory. The first such event took place in March 2015, in Addis Ababa, where the Ethiopian Wildlife Conservation Authority's 6.1-ton stockpile was burned.
- Republic of the Congo: 4.7 tons of ivory destroyed in 2015.
- United Arab Emirates: 11 tons of ivory destroyed in 2015.
- Mozambique: 2.4 tons of ivory as well as 440 lbs of rhinoceros horn destroyed in 2015.
- Sri Lanka: In January 2016, Sri Lanka became the first South Asian country to destroy its ivory (1.5 tons confiscated in 2012) and also the first to issue a formal apology for its role in the ivory trade.
- Italy: In March 2016, the Italian government partnered with the Elephant Action League to burn a tonne of ivory, worth an estimated £3.6 million GBP.
- Vietnam: On 12 November 2016, Vietnam destroyed nearly 2.2 tons of seized elephant ivory and 70 kg of rhinoceros horns.

== Techniques ==
Destroying ivory by any practical means is difficult. Burning is the most common method of large-scale destruction of ivory. When Kenya burned 12 tons of it in 1989, it created a major media spectacle and inspired similar actions around the world. More recently, crushing methods have also been used, as well as combinations of crushing and burning.

=== Burning ===
When Kenyan officials decided to destroy their stockpile in 1989, they had to find a way to do so that would create powerful images. Leakey turned to fellow conservationist Kuki Gallmann, who described their discussions and experiments in her memoir I Dreamed of Africa. She asked Hollywood special effects professional Robin Hollister what he would recommend, and introduced him to Leakey. Hollister understood Leakey's intention to create a spectacle, and the importance of producing an immediate dramatic flare-up. He suggested a combination of flammable glue to coat the tusks, and a hidden system of pipes to spray them with fuel. His plans were adopted, and when the Kenyan President held a torch to the waiting pile, "Flames flared up in a scalding blaze. [...] The ivory blackened and started burning, crackling. Deafening applause burst out from the crowd, while television crews from all over the world showed to every corner of the Earth this new sacrifice of Africa."

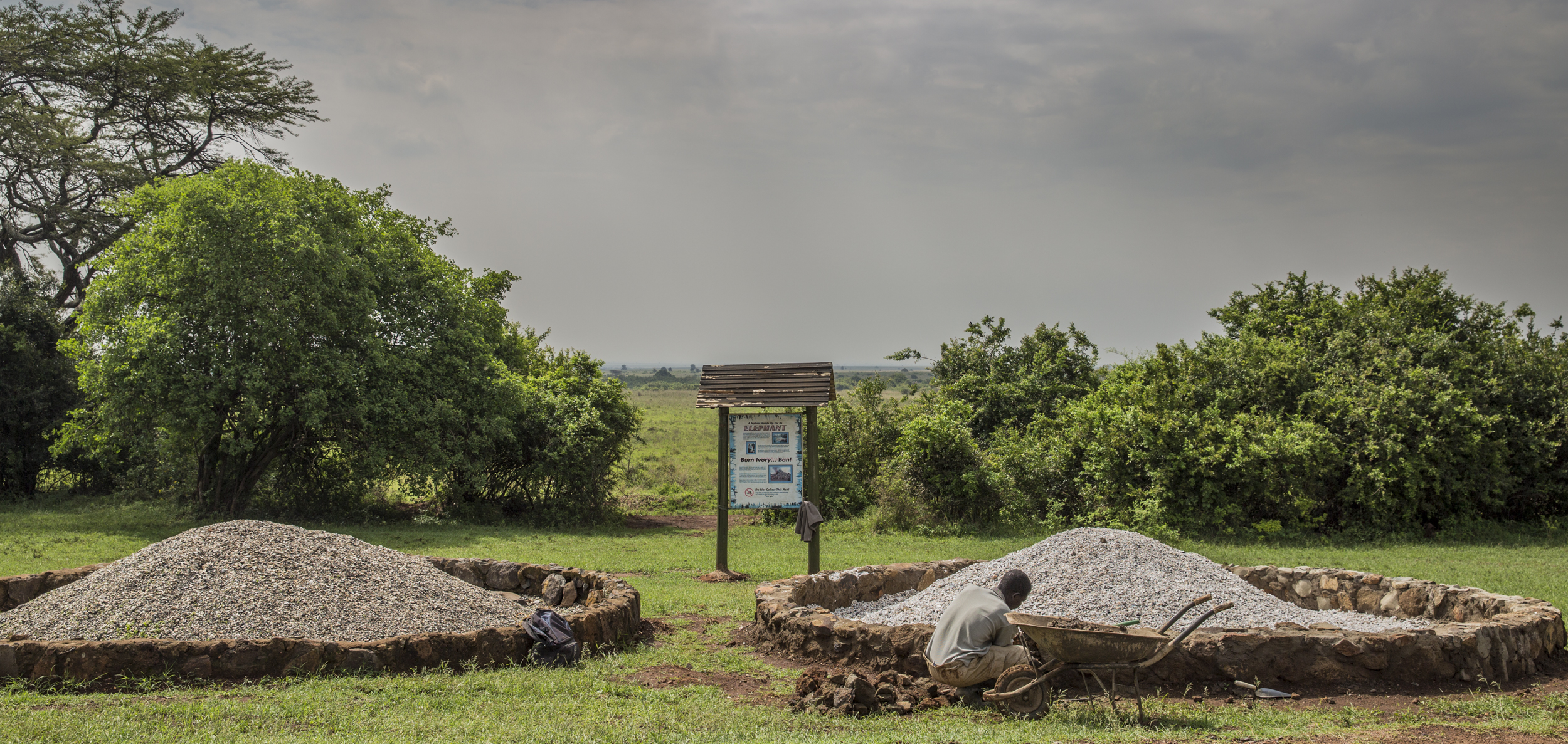
Ivory burning site in Kenya's Nairobi National Park

Research performed by the United States Fish and Wildlife Service (FWS) in 2008, found burning to be an inefficient and highly challenging way to destroy ivory when compared to crushing. Like human teeth, elephant tusks are resistant to burning. Simple burning typically just chars the outside; it requires extreme conditions over a long period of time to destroy ivory effectively. Using specialized equipment to burn a tusk at 1,800 °F (1,000 °C), its weight decreases by only 0.25 ounces (7 g) each minute (an average African elephant tusk is about 50 lb (23 kg) and can weigh as much as 130 lb (59 kg). For each of Kenya's burns, organizers used jet oil to increase the temperature and it still persists for about a week.

When only the outside is affected, the inner ivory is still commercially viable. As there are not yet verified techniques for identifying ivory that was previously burned, some have expressed concerns regarding the possible use of some of the burned stockpiles.

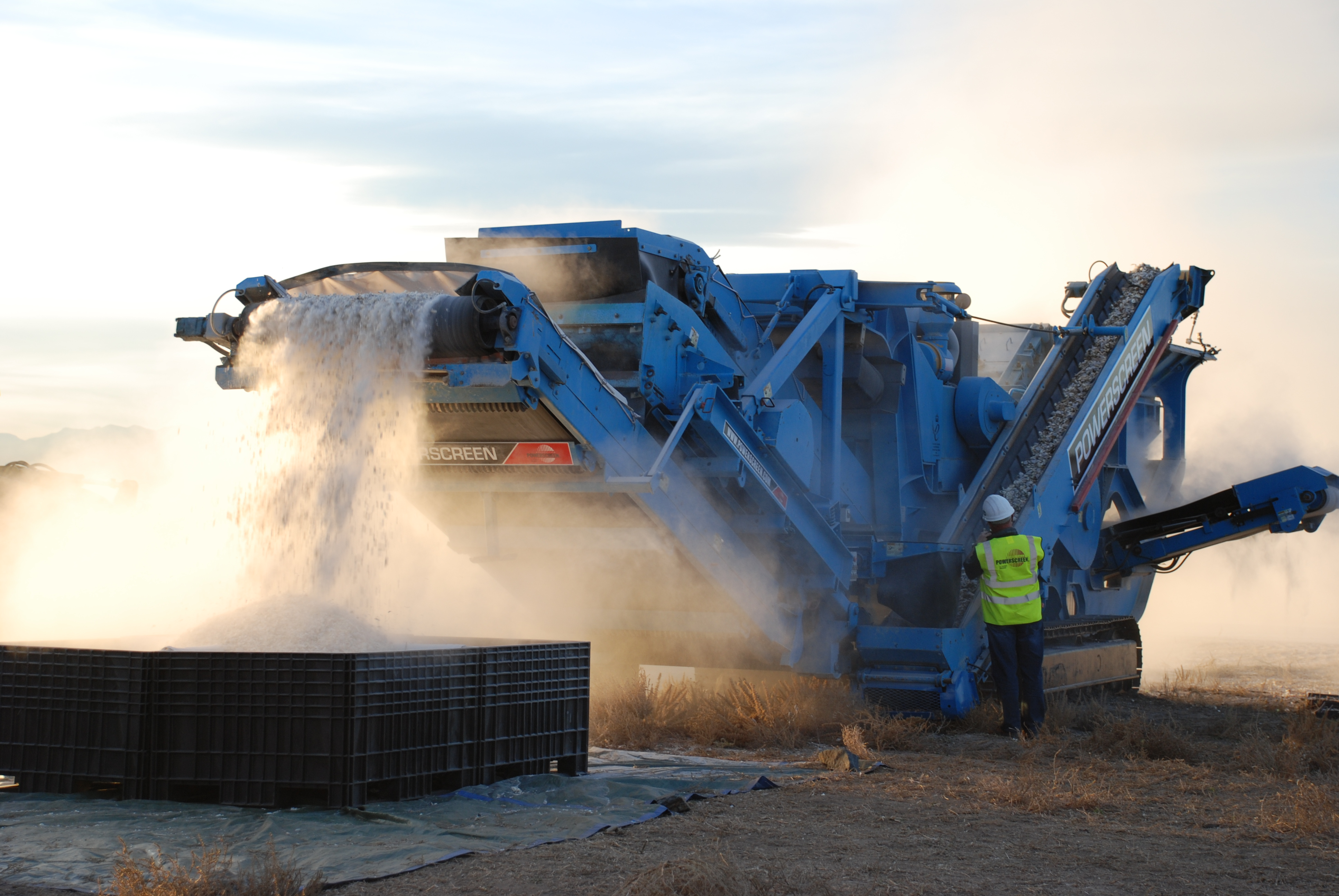
A rock crusher during the 2013 ivory crush in the United States

Hollister, the original "burn architect" who invented the technique in 1989, was asked to lead the 2016 burn, which was many times bigger than the first. He acknowledged that ivory does not really burn: "we have to raise the temperature in the fires to such a degree that it actually disintegrates. We're going to create [that] by combining kerosene and diesel and compressed air, pushing it at very high pressure, about 16 bar, down a pipe." The question of the effectiveness of the destruction – even the possibility that some of the partially combusted ivory may find its way back to the black market – is a touchy subject. "It's heresy to consider any other form of destruction, leave alone finding any other way to use the ivory or utilise wildlife resources."

=== Crushing ===
Crushing can also be challenging. In 2013, the Philippines resolved to crush their five-ton stockpile, in part due to environmental objections to a large open fire. They first attempted to use a road roller on the tusks and then on smaller, sawn-off pieces. When that did not work, the pieces were repeatedly smashed with a backhoe bucket. What was left was taken to a crematory. When the United States held a similar event a few months later, they opted to use a large rock crusher; a short time later, France employed a pulverizer to turn its illegal ivory into a powder onto which was then poured a composite material to ensure that none of the ivory could be used.

== Justification, objections, and impact ==
=== Messaging ===
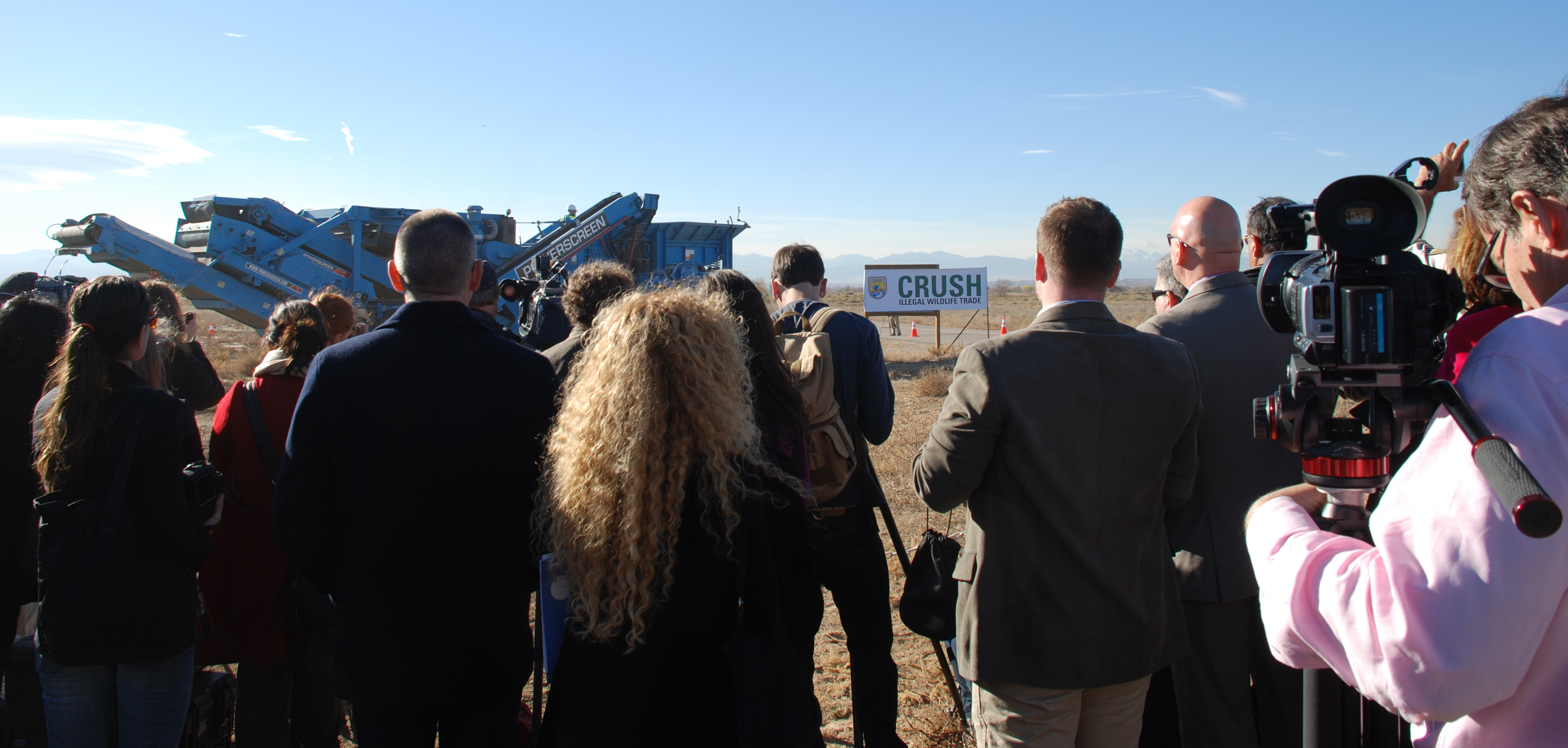
Journalists and other on-lookers at the 2013 ivory crush in the United States

Destroying ivory is a tactic endorsed by several governments, activists, and NGOs.

Richard Leakey, who was responsible for the first major ivory destruction in Kenya in 1989, argues that these acts are primarily about sending a message to foster a public that sees the value in wildlife itself, not its byproducts, and thereby influencing the demand side of the market. In explaining the "enormous impact" that he saw after the 1989 event, Leakey said that "up to that time we'd been losing about three and a half thousand to four thousand elephants a year, and a year later we were losing at most sixty." Consumer research in China, the world's largest consumer of ivory, showed that many potential buyers have little understanding of the connection between the ivory trade and steep declines in elephant populations. High-profile government events bring the problem to large numbers of people and affirm a government stance for anyone who had been unclear. The events also aim to signal decreasing acceptance and popularity of ivory goods, making them less desirable by lowering their status and shaming individuals, organizations, and institutions who buy, sell, or own the goods. In China, prices fell by nearly half between 2015 and 2016, following the government announcement that it would begin phasing out its domestic ivory trade. According to Hongxiang Huang in a report by NPR, the decline was not likely due to conservation reasons, but because "[o]ne thing that proud Chinese people don't want to be, these days, is behind the times."

Advocates also believe that destroying ivory can influence the supply side of the ivory market by sending a strong, highly visible and well-publicized message that the ivory market is dangerous and futile. Similarly, those who would otherwise consider ivory as an investment opportunity may think twice if the market is so consistently disrupted. French Minister of Ecology Philippe Martin called the destruction of ivory "indispensable in the fight against trafficking of threatened species" and said that it sends "a firm message".

In Botswana, which is home to almost half of the elephants in Africa, officials are opposed to destroying ivory stockpiles as of 2016, and President Ian Khama publicly boycotted the 2016 Kenyan burn. Botswanan officials believe that burning tusks communicates that the animal does not have value. Instead, confiscated goods like ivory and rhinoceros horns are displayed to symbolize the value of wildlife conservation. An example of this was the 2015 unveiling of an elephant statue, made entirely of ivory tusks, at the country's main international airport in Gaborone.

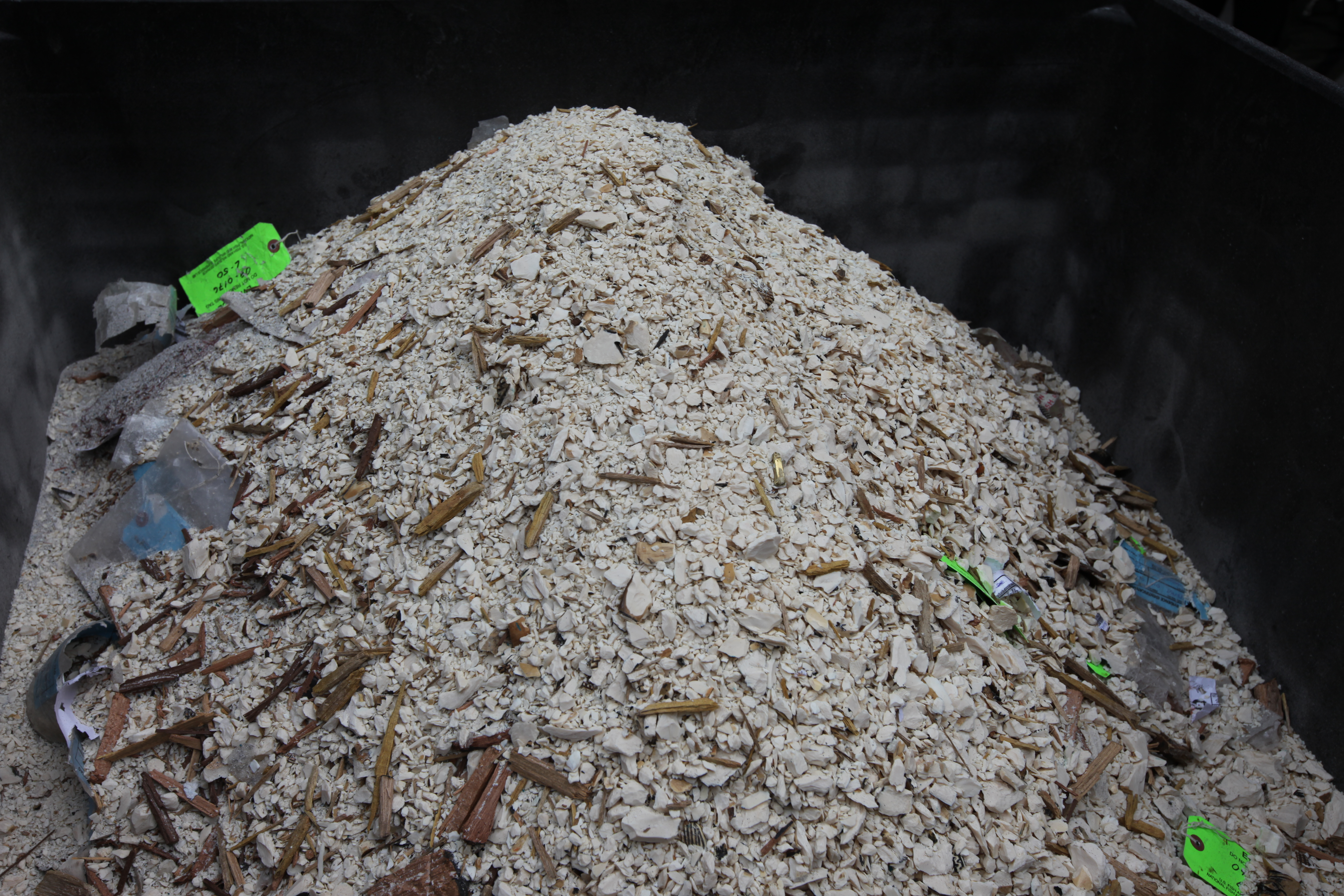
The remains of ivory sent through a rock crusher in New York in 2015

=== Economics ===
==== Scarcity ====
Several journalists and conservationists have challenged the logic of the strategy, arguing that destroying the ivory makes it scarcer, which should drive up black market prices and lead to an increase in poaching, rather than a decrease. Karl Mathiesen disputes this claim from a basic economics perspective, pointing out that it is the seizure of the ivory, not destroying it, which takes it off the market and affects its scarcity, so the price should not be significantly affected based on whether that seized ivory is kept stockpiled in a warehouse or destroyed. Although destroying seized ivory should not affect a perfectly rational market, Daniel Stiles suggests that what these events effectively communicate to poachers and illegal traders is the perception of scarcity, if not actual scarcity, which he argues could also lead to an increase in poaching.

An example several commentators point to is a 2014 study funded by Save the Elephants that found that the price of ivory tripled in China during four years following 2011. It correlated that trend to an increase in poaching as well as an increase in the frequency of high-profile events in which stockpiles were destroyed. Research published by the National Bureau of Economic Research offer an alternative theory: that the increase in price and demand "likely originated" with CITES's experimental allowance of a legal sale of a large amount of ivory in 2008. More recently, however, Save the Elephants reported the cost of ivory in China has fallen by nearly half, following an announcement by the Chinese government that it would phase out its domestic trade. In Japan, the demand for ivory has decreased since 2012 as a result of new consumer awareness through education about the connection between buying ivory and the killing of elephants.

Ultimately, Mathiesen describes the debate as "characterized by a lack of data", while Tom Milliken concluded in 2014 that the strategy needs to be closely monitored for effectiveness and that more data needs to be collected because as of 2014 there was not sufficient "proof that destroying supply leads to a decline in demand".

A related concern expressed by Stiles is that perceived scarcity may lead countries still active in the ivory trade to create stockpiles of their own, owing to "the senseless system now in operation" in countries like the United States, Thailand, and China, whereby international ivory trade is considered illegal but domestic trade is permitted, ensuring at least some continued demand and, in Stiles's view, "guaranteeing extinction of the elephant".

==== Opportunity costs ====
Instead of destroying confiscated ivory, a government could choose to sell it, and put the funds to use in one of several ways. Several of the countries involved in the ivory trade, especially those on the supply side in Africa, are also some of the nations which struggle the most with poverty. Destroying ivory in those countries is thus often a controversial decision for internal stakeholders as well as external commentators, as the funds gained by selling the material could be used to improve the quality of life for human citizens.

Confiscated ivory could also be sold to pay for conservation efforts. Zimbabwe, for example, which has long opposed the ban on the ivory trade, publicly refuses to destroy its 70-ton stockpile. As of 2016 the country is home to 83,000 elephants, but with its current economic situation it cannot afford continuing conservation efforts. According to Environment Minister Oppah Muchinguri-Kashiri, "To us, burning is not an option, we need the resources for sustainable wildlife conservation."

Economic research published in 2016 analyzed the efficacy of a one-time legal sale of ivory stockpiles to China and Japan, allowed by CITES in 2008. The idea was to try to flood the market, sinking prices and profitability, but the result was "catastrophic" according to one researcher, who attributes to it a significant, long-term increase in poaching due to factors like a reduction of the social stigma of ivory and providing a mechanism to obscure smuggling activities. Christopher Alden, who supported but did not take part in this analysis, specifically criticized requests from countries like Zimbabwe and Namibia to allow limited sales, due to the likelihood of them having a similar counterproductive outcome.

=== Corruption and security ===
Although the destruction of ivory is centered upon conservation, there are other considerations which affect institutions' decisions on the matter.

When Hong Kong announced the destruction of its stockpile, it noted "the management burden and the security risk" inherent in the possession of large quantities of valuable material. For example, when the Philippines decided to burn its stockpile, only a fraction of what it had confiscated over the years remained, with at least six tons "lost" or stolen during the 2000s alone. Stockpiles of ivory have often been connected to theft and corruption, with multiple countries, including Zambia, Mozambique, Botswana, and the Philippines, suffering "losses" of several tons. Keeping illicit goods on hand can also signal government plans or active involvement with the ivory trade. Destroying it removes the possibility of corruption as well as the costs associated with operating a secure place of storage.

For Paula Kahumbu, CEO of Kenya's WildlifeDirect, maintaining stockpiles does too much to enable illegal trade to justify keeping it rather than destroying it. She told NPR that when an ivory dealer wants to obtain ivory, the most sensible way to do so is not to go hunting, which carries many risks, but to "raid a stockpile by bribing the guy who has the key". She gives examples of tusks being lost from vaults and even courtroom exhibits due to corruption.

In the United States, research linking the ivory trade to terrorism and organized crime has tied the destruction of ivory stockpiles to national security, not just conservation.

== See also ==
- Coral poaching
- Wildlife management
- Wildlife smuggling
