= Coral poaching =

Removal of coral from protected areas for sale

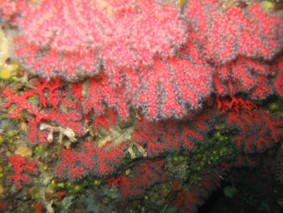
Red coral

Coral poaching is the harvesting of highly valued coral species from protected areas for sale as various types of jewellery that could be sold for up to $1,800 per gram. The illegal removal of coral is one of the largest environmental issues in many countries in East Asia, Southeast Asia, and South Asia, destroying valuable ecosystems that harbor marine life. Harvesting coral colonies also causes significant financial loss to surrounding economies and destruction of environments.

== Background ==
Coral is one of the most highly valued material for jewelry in many parts of Asia. It has a wholesale market value between $50 million and $60 million per year, with the value of each piece of jewelry based on the color, size, and quality of the coral. The most common type that is sold is red coral, considered the most precious of all types and sometimes thought to be endowed with pseudoscientific properties. Due to this, coral has been harvested and traded for centuries throughout Asia.

Since the 8th century, people have poached coral from marine ecosystems. Coral poaching is a major environmental problem in Asia and continues to destroy valuable ecosystems and habitats. As of 2015, an estimated 18.7% of coral reefs are in marine protected areas and only 2% of these areas satisfactorily prevent further degradation. It is estimated that illegal coral extraction generates $230,000,000 annually. This causes a significant loss of value in the area being poached and harms the marine wildlife in the area. In 1997, it was reported that many exporters of precious coral come from Hong Kong, Taiwan, and Indonesia.

== Commercial applications ==
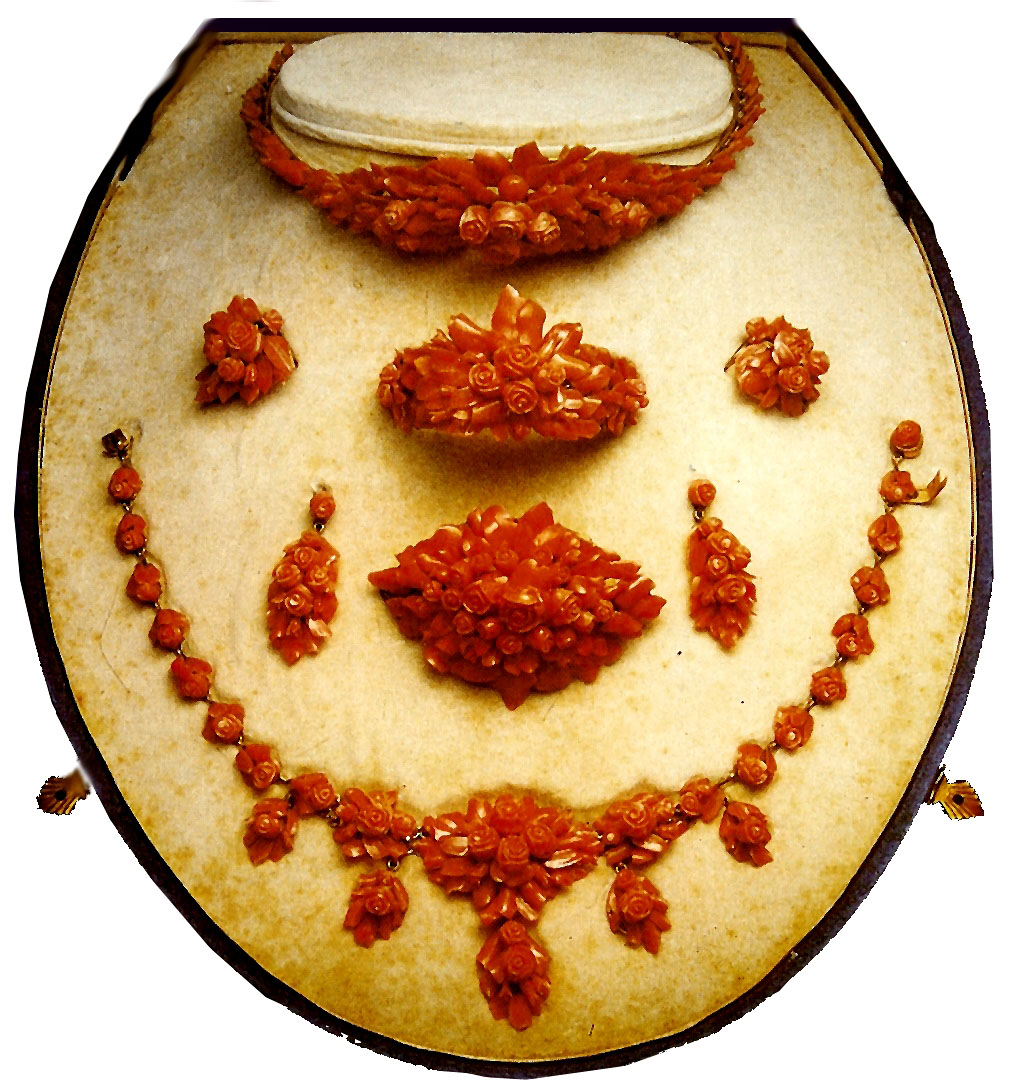
Coral jewelry, Coral Jewellery Museum

The market for coral is mainly in Asia. Often, coral is poached by fishermen from China, India, or Japan claiming to be on fishing trips. Divers on these boats then harvest coral and take it to be cured and refined into jewelry for sale. Coral is also mined for limestone and other construction materials for bricks, road-fill, and cement. It is also harvested for the calcium in the coral, as well as for decoration in marine aquariums. Jewelry companies in China, Taiwan, and India are willing to pay high prices for coral. With one colony of coral fetching up to $65,0000 a piece, many fishermen are willing to risk penalties. Illegal confiscation of coral colonies occurs along the sea borders between China and Japan.

Coral reefs also shelter species that naturally produce vital antibacterial and other chemical defense compounds used in medicine, including for treatments for cancer, arthritis, heart disease, bacterial and viral infection, and asthma. The chemical compounds and the breeding grounds for fish that coral reefs provide commercial value estimated by the National Marine Fisheries Service to be over $100-million.

The most heavily extracted corals are boulder corals and branching corals, with the boulder corals from the genera Porites and Faria being the most carefully extracted from the Gulf of Mannar. Both types are primary contributors of sediment deposition and defense for the reef island and are primary reef builders.

== Environmental impact ==
Most coral colonies take a long time to recover from harvest, and the effect on the ecosystem can be tremendous. About one-third of coral reefs worldwide are damaged beyond repair and the rest is in critical condition and under threat. A coral site could take at least 10 years to fully recover and up to 50 years to reach its former function in the environment. Many marine wildlife populations use coral for food, habitat, and protection against predators. When a coral colony is destroyed, it removes wildlife in the area and makes preservation almost impossible in the future. Mining coral colonies also changes the composition of the sediment in the area, which has a detrimental effect on marine life.

Coral extraction can cause significant harm, as coastlines and fish are protected and preserved by the presence of coral reefs. Coastlines become vulnerable when the forces of the currents are no longer being dissipated by coral reef structures. Many towns and cities depend on the defense of coral reefs on their shores, such as the homes and businesses lining the shores of Florida Keys. Without coral reefs, buildings are at greater risk of water damage due to erosion of the shore line. Reefs are also critical to marine biodiversity. Up to 25% of marine life is found in coral reef ecosystems, and up to 7,000 species depend on reefs to survive. Scientists are working on growing coral in farms to later transplant into damaged areas.

Because of their water filtering abilities, coral reefs help keep the ocean clean. Corals and sponges filter feed by drawing water through their pores, consuming the debris, then releasing the filtered water back into the environment. Studies have shown that sponges in reefs are able to capture and absorb sugar in the water and shed them into the seabed below, feeding snails and other bottom feeders. These bottom feeders become food for larger fish, continuing the food chain that larger fish and humans depend on.

Many reefs have lost 40 to 50% of their corals in the past 30 years. Coral reefs are some of Earth's most remarkable natural structures and have more than aesthetic significance. These tiny animals support the lives of thousands of other species, including humans. Spiny lobsters, for example, rely on coral reefs for protection, especially during their vulnerable molting episodes. Hawksbill sea turtles have become critically endangered and are highly dependent on coral reefs for food, which mainly consists of sponges.

In the Great Barrier Reef of Australia, the extraction of coral has led to significant decreases in the dimensions of cays and coral reefs. The Great Barrier Reef has experienced many environmental impacts resulting from coral poaching such as; heightened erosion of existing geographic formations, complete destruction of cays, a substantial decline in coral coverage and variety, elevated levels of turbidity and deposition of sediment, increased algal colonization, reduction in the number of fish and heightened susceptibility to other environmental influences.

Coral reefs off the coast of Tanzania on Mafia Island serve as natural barriers to hydrodynamic forces, creating an environment with low-energy levels and enabling the growth of seagrass beds and mangrove forests, two key ecosystems to the biodiversity of the area.

== Political issues ==
Coral poaching is illegal. Poachers harvest coral from both private and protected areas, harming marine life and other life forms around them. Poachers also use substances and produce waste that are toxic or deadly to coral, a sensitive species. Poaching of reef fish also contributes to a decrease of corals worldwide, because the fish graze the coral and in turn keeps the coral healthy.

In some areas, coral reefs are a major tourist attraction. The loss of coral reefs means loss of revenue and employment for the community. For example, most of the estimated 5 million people who visit the Florida Keys each year contribute to the economy that the coral reefs provide. The Keys average about 2.4 billion dollars from tourism and ocean recreation. More than half of the jobs in the community depend on a healthy ocean and healthy coral reefs.

Due to the impact of coral poaching across Asia, government officials in Japan have started taking action against coral poaching in Japanese waters. Japanese Prime Minister Shinzō Abe met with Chinese Communist Party general secretary Xi Jinping in regards to taking action against Chinese coral poachers working in Japanese waters. The illegal removal of coral in the area due to high demand for Japanese coral jewelry in China is causing maritime tensions between the two nations. The main concern for the Japanese government is that coral mining results in significant long-term losses to their fisheries, shore line safety, and leisure/travel industries.

Coral extraction of fossilized limestone, AKA coral rag, and living reef coral is extensively carried out along the Tanzanian coastline, with the most significant levels of mining occurring on the offshore islands. The mining of live coral has been emphasized as one of the most harmful extractive practices in the region, according to a study done by biologist Nicholas K. Dulvy.

Kuna-Yala is an indigenous province in the northeast of Panama with prominent coral reefs off the coast. Due to population expansions, the Kuna people of Kuna-Yala, Panama, have participated in coral extraction and landfilling for many years.

== Prevention ==
Many nations are working towards preventing poachers from mining coral in shallow-reef areas that harbor marine wildlife and habitats. The Japanese government punishes anyone poaching coral in their waters with up to six months imprisonment or a ¥300,000 fine. In the United States, a group known as SeaWeb has worked with other agencies to prevent illegal poaching as well as the preservation of coral colonies.

Possible methods to eliminate the illegal removal of precious coral colonies include:

- Improve guidelines of coral reef trade that requires demonstration of maintainable use and assortment, for both domestic and international trade
- Establish "no-take" Marine Protected Areas as environmental reserves
- Create administration plans that limit harvesting to a supportable level
- Prevent destruction of coral reefs through legal action and execution
- Encourage certification schemes which give sustainable gathered coral products a market benefit, such as the Marine Aquarium Council (MAC)
- Teach consumers of coral reef products and the consequences of their choices
- Educate resident communities on maintainable fishing procedures and alternative livings

Preventing fisherman from illegally harvesting coral in many parts of the world will allow coral colonies to repopulate and provide the necessary ecosystems for many marine life forms that depend on coral for survival.

== See also ==
- Wildlife management
- Wildlife smuggling
