= Gamba, Chad =

Gamba خامبا
- Town
- Location in Chad
- Coordinates: 9°42′20″N 14°52′52″E
- Country: Chad
- Region: Mayo-Kebbi Ouest Region
- Department: Mayo-Dallah
- Sub-prefecture: Pala

Gamba (Arabic: خامبا) or Ganba is a small town in the Mayo-Kebbi Ouest Region of southwestern Chad. It is located approximately 35 kilometres (22 mi) north of Pala, to the southwest of Fianga, about 25 kilometres (16 mi) south of the border with Cameroon. Elephant poaching in the area is a problem and of the worst massacres took place on 14-15 March 2013 when 89 elephants, including 33 pregnant females and 15 calves, were slaughtered by poachers near the town.
