= Ivory trade =

Commercial, often illegal, trade of animal ivory

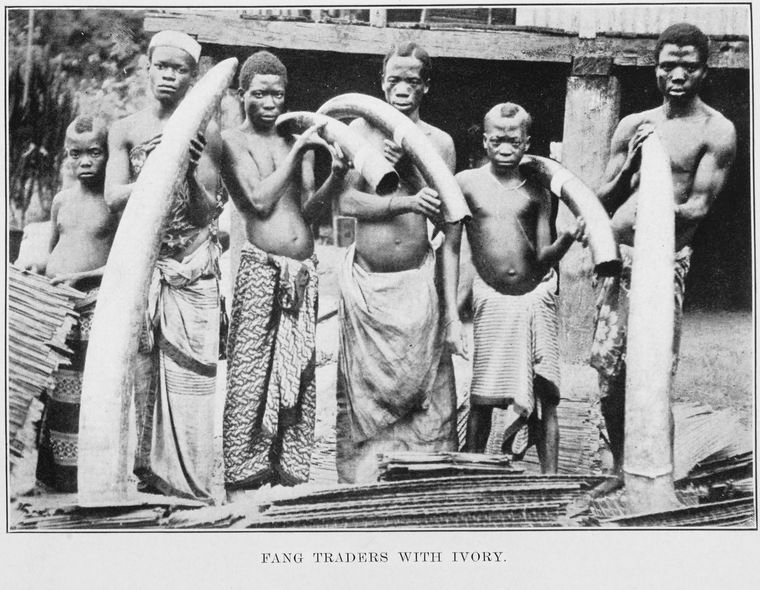
Ivory traders, c. 1912

The ivory trade is the commercial, often illegal trade in the ivory tusks of the hippopotamus, walrus, narwhal, mammoth, and most commonly, African and Asian elephants.

Ivory has been traded for hundreds of years by people in Africa and Asia, resulting in restrictions and bans. Ivory was formerly used to make piano keys and other decorative items because of the white color it presents when processed but the piano industry abandoned ivory as a key covering material in the 1980s in favor of other materials such as plastic. Also, synthetic ivory has been developed which can be used as an alternative material for making piano keys.

== Elephant ivory ==
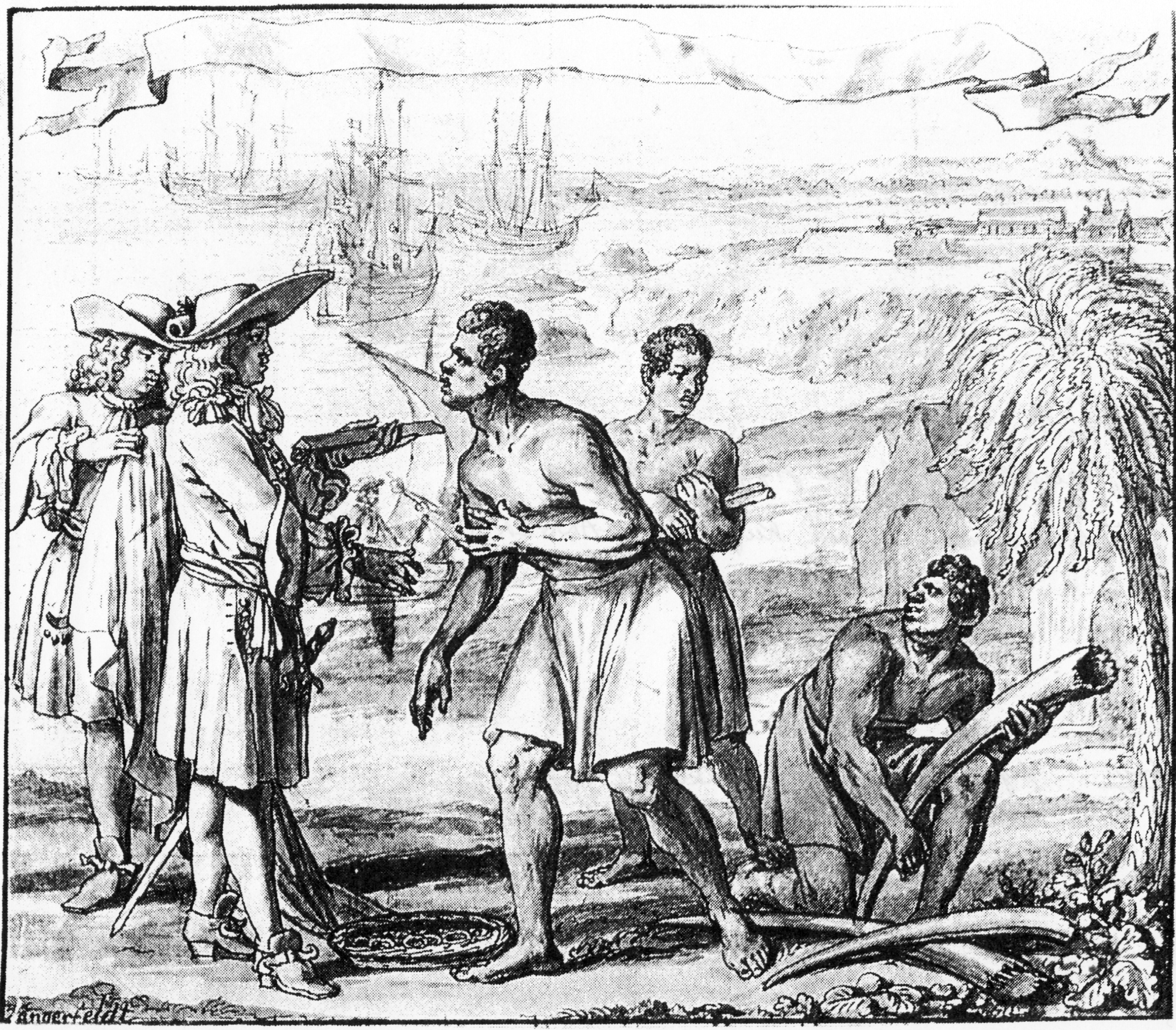
Ivory trade in Ghana, 1690

Elephant ivory has been exported from Africa and Asia for millennia with records going back to the 14th century BCE. Transport of the heavy commodity was always difficult, and with the establishment of the early-modern slave trades from East and West Africa, freshly captured slaves were used to carry the heavy tusks to the ports where both the tusks and their carriers were sold. The ivory was used for piano keys, billiard balls and other expressions of exotic wealth. At the peak of the ivory trade, pre-20th century, during the colonization of Africa, around 800 to 1,000 tonnes of ivory were sent to Europe alone every year.

World wars and the subsequent economic depressions caused a lull in this luxury commodity, but increased prosperity in the 1960s and early 1970s saw a resurgence. Japan, relieved from its exchange restrictions imposed after World War II, started to buy up raw (unworked) ivory. This started to put pressure on the forest elephants of Africa and Asia, both of which were used to supply the hard ivory preferred by the Japanese for the production of hanko, name seal stamps used like a signature. Prior to this period, most name seals had been made from wood with an ivory tip, carved with the signature, but increased prosperity saw the formerly unseen solid ivory hanko in mass production. Softer ivory from East Africa and southern Africa was traded for souvenirs, jewelry and trinkets.

While the massive demand for hanko drove the majority of Japan's consumption, ivory has also historically been used in the production of high-status cultural objects, including components for the Japanese tea ceremony (Chanoyu). This includes the custom-made lids (futa) for certain types of ceramic tea caddies (chaki), which remain objects of traditional value. The persistence of ivory use in such high-end cultural practices keeps the issue linked to contemporary conservation debates.

By the 1970s, Japan consumed about 40% of the global trade; another 40% was consumed by Europe and North America, often worked in Hong Kong, which was the largest trade hub, with most of the rest remaining in Africa. China, yet to become the economic force of today, consumed small amounts of ivory to keep its skilled carvers in business.

=== African elephant ===
==== 1980s poaching and illegal trade ====
In 1979, the African elephant population was estimated to be around 1.3 million in 37 range states, but by 1989, only 600,000 remained. Although many ivory traders repeatedly claimed that the problem was habitat loss, it became glaringly clear that the threat was primarily the international ivory trade. Throughout this decade, around 75,000 African elephants were killed for the ivory trade annually, worth around 1 billion dollars. About 80% of this was estimated to come from illegally killed elephants.

The international deliberations over the measures required to prevent the serious decline in elephant numbers almost always ignored the loss of human life in Africa, the fueling of corruption, the "currency" of ivory in buying arms, and the breakdown of law and order in areas where illegal ivory trade flourished. The debate usually rested on the numbers of elephants, estimates of poached elephants and official ivory statistics. Activists such as Jim Nyamu have described current ivory prices for poached ivory and the dangers such activists face from organized poaching.

Solutions to the problem of poaching and illegal trade focused on trying to control international ivory movements through CITES (Convention on International Trade in Endangered Species of Wild Fauna and Flora).

Although poaching remains a concern in areas of Africa, it is not the only threat for the elephants who roam its wilderness. Fences in farmlands are becoming increasingly more common; this disrupts the elephants' migration patterns and can cause herds to separate.

==== CITES debate, an attempt to control and ban ====
Some CITES parties (member states), led by Zimbabwe, stated that wildlife had to have economic value attached to it to survive and that local communities needed to be involved. Ivory was widely accepted in terms of non-lethal use of wildlife, but a debate raged over lethal use as in the case of the ivory trade. Most encounters between CITES officials and local bands of poachers erupted in violent struggle, killing men and women on each side. It was recognised that the "sustainable lethal use of wildlife" argument was in jeopardy if the ivory trade could not be controlled. In 1986, CITES introduced a new control system involving CITES paper permits, registration of huge ivory stockpiles and monitoring of legal ivory movements. These controls were supported by most CITES parties as well as the ivory trade and the established conservation movement represented by World Wide Fund for Nature (WWF), Traffic and the International Union for Conservation of Nature (IUCN).

In 1986 and 1987, CITES registered 89.5 and 297 tonnes of ivory in Burundi and Singapore respectively. Burundi had one known live wild elephant and Singapore had none. The stockpiles were recognized to have largely come from poached elephants. The CITES Secretariat was later admonished by the US delegate for redefining the term "registration" as "amnesty". The result of this was realised in undercover investigations by the Environmental Investigation Agency (EIA), a small NGO with few resources, when they met with traders in Hong Kong. Large parts of the stockpiles were owned by international criminals behind the poaching and illegal international trade. Well-known Hong Kong-based traders such as Wang and Poon were beneficiaries of the amnesty, and elephant expert Iain Douglas-Hamilton commented on the Burundi amnesty that it "made at least two millionaires". EIA confirmed with their investigations that not only had these syndicates made enormous wealth, but they also possessed huge quantities of CITES permits with which they continued to smuggle new ivory, which if stopped by customs, they produced the paper permit. CITES had created a system which increased the value of ivory on the international market, rewarded international smugglers and gave them the ability to control the trade and continue smuggling new ivory.

Further failures of this "control" system were uncovered by the EIA when they gained undercover access and filmed ivory carving factories run by Hong Kong traders, including Poon, in the United Arab Emirates. They also collected official trade statistics, airway bills and further evidence in UAE, Singapore and Hong Kong. The UAE statistics showed that this country alone had imported over 200 tonnes of raw and simply prepared ivory in 1987/88. Almost half of this had come from Tanzania where they had a complete ban on ivory. It underlined that the ivory traders rewarded by CITES with the amnesties were running rings around the system.

Despite these public revelations by the EIA, and followed by media exposures (including ITV's The Cook Report) and appeals from African countries and a range of well-respected organisations around the world, WWF only came out in support of a ban in mid-1989, indicating the importance of the "lethal use" principle of wildlife to WWF and CITES; even then, the group attempted to water down decisions at the October 1989 meeting of CITES.

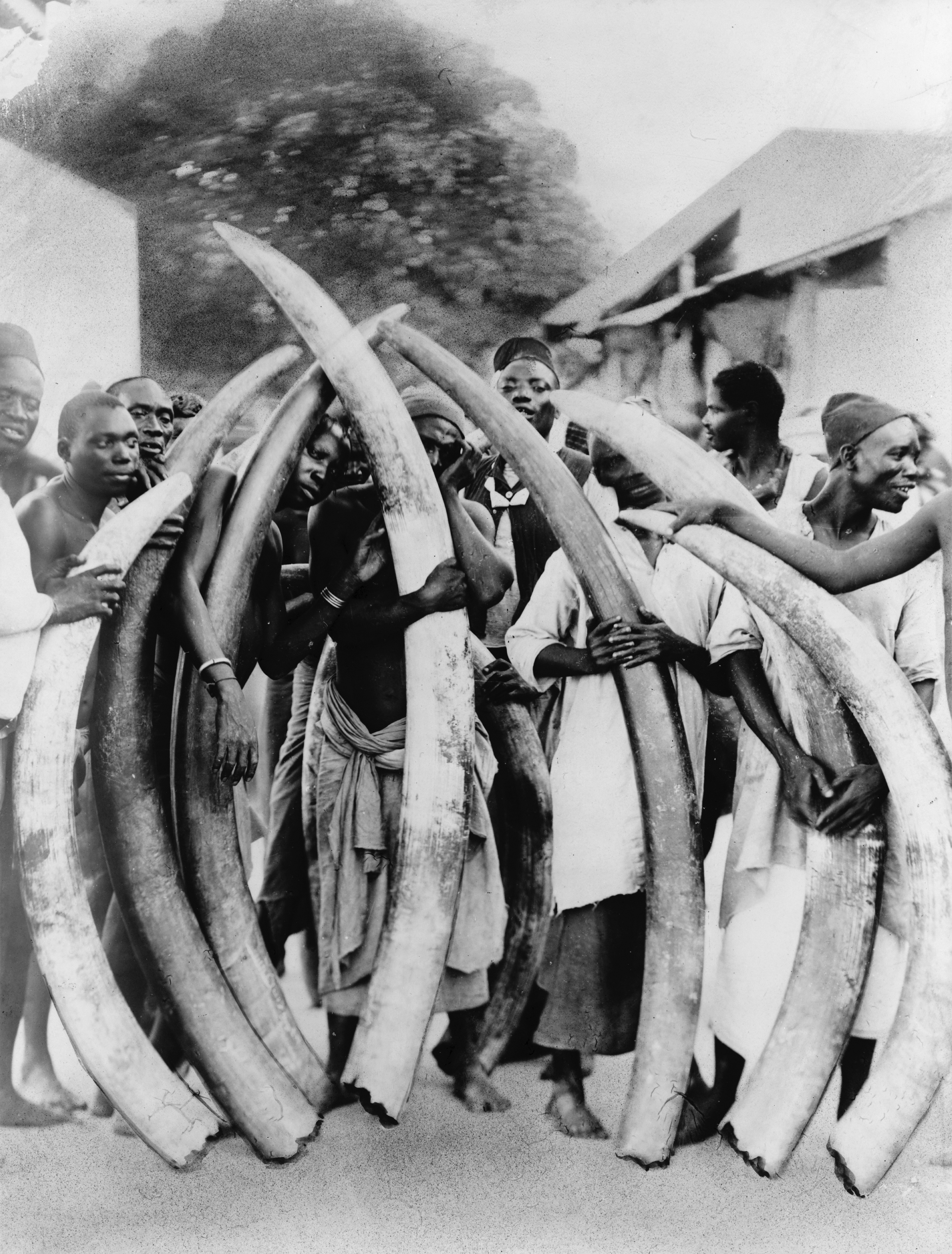
Men with ivory tusks from the African elephant, Dar es Salaam, Tanzania

Tanzania, attempting to break down the ivory syndicates that it recognized were corrupting its society, proposed an Appendix One listing for the African Elephant (effectively a ban on international trade). Some southern African countries including South Africa and Zimbabwe were vehemently opposed. They claimed that their elephant populations were well managed and they wanted revenue from ivory sales to fund conservation. Although both countries were implicated as entrepôts in illegal ivory from other African countries, WWF, with strong ties to both countries, found itself in a difficult position. It is well documented that publicly it opposed the trade but privately tried to appease these southern African states. However, the so-called Somalia-Proposal, presented by the governmental delegation of the Republic of Somalia, of which nature protection specialist Prof. Julian Bauer was an official member, then broke the stalemate and the elephant moratorium with its ban of elephant ivory trade was adopted by the CITES delegates.

Finally at that October meeting of CITES after heated debates, the African elephant was put on Appendix One of CITES, and three months later in January 1990 when the decision was enacted, the international trade in ivory was banned.

It is widely accepted that the ivory ban worked. The poaching epidemic that had hit so much of the African elephants' range was greatly reduced. Ivory prices plummeted and ivory markets around the world closed, almost all of which were in Europe and the US. It has been reported that it was not simply the act of the Appendix One listing and various national bans associated with it, but the enormous publicity surrounding the issue prior to the decision and afterwards, that created a widely accepted perception that the trade was harmful and now illegal. Richard Leakey stated that stockpiles remained unclaimed in Kenya and it became cheaper and easier for authorities to control the killing of elephants.

==== Southern African oppositions to the ban ====
Throughout the debate which led to the 1990 ivory ban, a group of southern African countries supported Hong Kong and Japanese ivory traders to maintain trade. This was stated to be because these countries claimed to have well-managed elephant populations and they needed the revenue from ivory sales to fund conservation. These countries were South Africa, Zimbabwe, Botswana, Namibia and Swaziland. They voted against the Appendix One listing and actively worked to reverse the decision.

The two countries leading the attempt to overturn the ban immediately after it was agreed were South Africa and Zimbabwe.

South Africa's claim that its elephants were well managed was not seriously challenged. However, its role in the illegal ivory trade and slaughter of elephants in neighbouring countries was exposed in numerous news articles of the time, as part of its policy of destabilisation of its neighbours. 95% of South Africa's elephants were found in Kruger National Park which was partly run by the South African Defence Force (SADF) which trained, supplied and equipped the rebel Mozambique army RENAMO. RENAMO was heavily implicated in large-scale ivory poaching to finance its army.

Zimbabwe had embraced "sustainable" use policies of its wildlife, seen by some governments and the WWF as a pattern for future conservation. Conservationists and biologists hailed Zimbabwe's Communal Areas Management Programme for Indigenous Resources (CAMPFIRE) as a template for community empowerment in conservation. The failure to prevent the Appendix One listing through CITES came as a blow to this movement. Zimbabwe may have made the career of some biologists, but it was not honest with its claims. The government argued the ivory trade would fund conservation efforts, but revenues were instead returned to the central treasury. Its elephant census was accused of double counting elephants crossing its border with Botswana by building artificial waterholes. The ivory trade was also wildly out of control within its borders, with Zimbabwe National Army (ZNA) involvement in poaching in Gonarezhou National Park and other areas. More sinister was the alleged murder of a string of whistle-blowers, including a Capt. Nleya, who claimed the ZNA was involved in rhinoceros and elephant poaching in Mozambique. Nleya was found hanged at his army barracks near Hwange National Park. The death was reported as suicide by the army, but declared a murder by a magistrate. Nleya's widow was reportedly later threatened by anonymous telephone calls.

The dispute over the ivory trade involves opposing sets of perceived national interests. The debate is further complicated by the many academic and policy disciplines at play, including biology, census techniques, economics, international trade dynamics, conflict resolution, and criminology—all reported to CITES delegates representing over 170 countries. The decisions made within this agreement have often been highly political. Inevitably, it attracts misinformation, skulduggery and crime.

The southern African countries continue to attempt to sell ivory through legal systems. In an appeal to overcome national interests, a group of eminent elephant scientists responded with an open letter in 2002 which clearly explained the effects of the ivory trade on other countries. They stated that the proposals for renewed trade from southern Africa did not bear comparison with most of Africa because they were based on a South African model where 90% of the elephant population lived in a fenced National Park. They went on to describe South Africa's wealth and ability to enforce the law within these boundaries. By comparison, they made it clear that most elephants in Africa live in poorly protected and unfenced bush or forest. They finished their appeal by describing the poaching crisis of the 1980s, and emphasized that the decision to ban ivory was not made to punish southern African countries, but to save the elephants in the rest of the world.

Southern African countries have continued to push for the international ivory trade. Led by Zimbabwe's President Robert Mugabe, they had some success through CITES. Mugabe himself had been accused of bartering tonnes of ivory for weapons with China, breaking his country's commitment to CITES.

On 16 November 2017, it was announced that US President Donald Trump had lifted a ban on ivory imports from Zimbabwe implemented by Barack Obama.

==== African voices ====
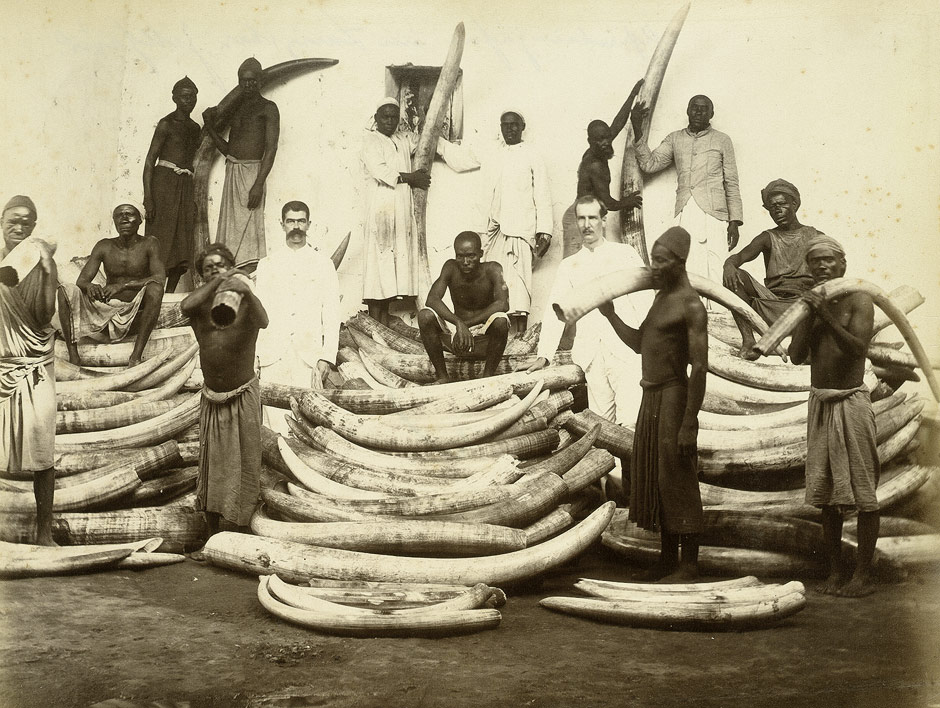
Ivory trade in East Africa during the 1880s and 1890s

The debate surrounding ivory trade has often been depicted as Africa versus the West.

The novel Heart of Darkness, by Joseph Conrad, describes the brutal ivory trade as a wild, senseless wielding of power in support of the resource-hungry economic policies of European imperialists, describing the situation in Congo between 1890 and 1910 as "the vilest scramble for loot that ever disfigured the history of human conscience."

However, the southern Africans have always been in a minority within the African elephant range states. To reiterate this point, 19 African countries signed the "Accra Declaration" in 2006 calling for a total ivory trade ban, and 20 range states attended a meeting in Kenya calling for a 20-year moratorium in 2007.

==== Renewed sales ====
Using criteria that had been agreed upon at the 1989 CITES meeting, among much controversy and debate, in 1997 CITES parties agreed to allow the populations of African elephants in Botswana, Namibia and Zimbabwe to be "downlisted" to Appendix Two which would allow international trade in elephant parts. However, the decision was accompanied by "registering" stockpiles within these countries and examining trade controls in any designated importing country. CITES once again was attempting to set up a control system.

Forty-nine tonnes of ivory was registered in these three countries, and Japan's assertion that it had sufficient controls in place was accepted by CITES and the ivory was sold to Japanese traders in 1997 as an "experiment".

In 2000, South Africa also "downlisted" its elephant population to CITES Appendix Two with a stated desire to sell its ivory stockpile. In the same year, CITES agreed to the establishment of two systems to inform its member states on the status of illegal killing and trade. The two systems, Monitoring the Illegal Killing of Elephants (MIKE) and Elephant Trade Information System (ETIS), have been highly criticised as a waste of money for not being able to prove or disprove any causality between ivory stockpile sales and poaching levels—perhaps the most significant reason for their establishment. They do pull together information on poaching and seizures as provided by member states, although not all states provide comprehensive data.

The effect of the sale of ivory to Japan in 2000 was hotly debated with Traffic, the organization which compiled the ETIS and MIKE databases, claiming they could not determine any link. However, many of those on the ground claimed that the sale had changed the perception of ivory, and many poachers and traders believed they were back in business.

A seizing of over 6 tonnes of ivory in Singapore in 2002 provided a stark warning that poaching in Africa was not for only local markets, but that some of the ivory syndicates from the 1980s were operating again. 532 elephant tusks and over 40,000 blank ivory hankos were seized, and the EIA carried out investigations which showed that this case had been preceded by 19 other suspected ivory shipments, four destined for China and the rest for Singapore, though often en route to Japan. The ivory originated in Zambia and was collected in Malawi before being containerized and shipped out of South Africa. Between March 1994 and May 1998, nine suspected shipments had been sent by the same company Sheng Luck from Malawi to Singapore. After this, they started to be dispatched to China. Analysis and cross-referencing revealed company names and company directors already known to the EIA from investigations in the 1980s—the Hong Kong criminal ivory syndicates were active again.

In 2002, another 60 tonnes of ivory from South Africa, Botswana and Namibia was approved for sale, and in 2006, Japan was approved as a destination for the ivory. Japan's ivory controls were seriously questioned with 25% of traders not even registered, voluntary rather than legal requirement of traders, and illegal shipments entering Japan. A report by the Japan Wildlife Conservation Society warned that the price of ivory jumped due to price fixing by a small number of manufacturers who controlled the bulk of the ivory—similar to the control of stocks when stockpiles were amnestied in the 1980s. Before the sale took place, in the wings China was seeking approval as an ivory destination country.

In 2014, Uganda said that it was investigating the theft of about 3,000 lb (1,400 kg) of ivory from the vaults of its state-run wildlife protection agency. Poaching is acute in central Africa, which is said to have lost at least 60 percent of its elephants in the past decade.

==== The rise of Asia, modern European trade and the modern poaching crisis ====
Esmond Martin has said,

When the exchange restrictions imposed upon Japan after the Second World War were lifted during the late 1960s, it began importing huge amounts of raw ivory.

Martin said that Chinese carvers mainly sold ivory products to neighbors in the 1990s and not to internal buyers in China:

These were supplying shops selling trinkets to tourists and businessmen from Asian countries such as Japan, Singapore, Taiwan, Hong Kong, Malaysia and Indonesia, where the anti-ivory culture wasn't so strong, They were also exporting worked ivory wholesale to neighbouring countries. The Chinese were buying some ivory products for themselves, but only a small proportion.

Born Free Foundation CEO Will Travers said that,

Even if we managed to close down all the unregulated markets around the world, there would still be a demand for illegal ivory coming from countries such as China and Japan.

To demonstrate the lack of ivory controls in China, the EIA leaked an internal Chinese document showing how 121 tonnes of ivory from its own official stockpile (equivalent to the tusks from 11,000 elephants) could not be accounted for, a Chinese official admitting "this suggests a large amount of illegal sale of the ivory stockpile has taken place." However, a CITES mission recommended that CITES approve China's request, and this was supported by WWF and TRAFFIC. China gained its "approved" status at a meeting of the CITES Standing Committee on 15 July 2008. China's State Council has announced that China is banning all ivory trade and processing activities by the end of 2017. The commercial processing and sale of ivory will stop by 31 March 2017. The announcement was welcomed by conservation group WWF, who called it a "historic announcement... signalling an end to the world's primary legal ivory market and a major boost to international efforts to tackle the elephant poaching crisis."

China and Japan bought 108 tonnes of ivory in another "one-off" sale in November 2008 from Botswana, South Africa, Namibia and Zimbabwe. At the time, the idea was that these legal ivory sales may depress the price, thereby removing poaching pressure, an idea supported by both TRAFFIC and WWF. Illegal ivory continues to flow into Japan's ivory market, but since 2012, the demand for ivory has decreased as a result of new consumer awareness through education about the connection between buying ivory and the killing of elephants.

China's increased involvement in infrastructure projects in Africa and the purchase of natural resources has alarmed many conservationists who fear the extraction of wildlife body parts is increasing. Since China was given "approved buyer" status by CITES, the smuggling of ivory seems to have increased alarmingly. Although, WWF and TRAFFIC, which supported the China sale, describe the increase in illegal ivory trade a possible "coincidence", others are less cautious. Chinese nationals working in Africa have been caught smuggling ivory in many African countries, with at least ten arrested at Kenyan airports in 2009. In many African countries, domestic markets have grown, providing easy access to ivory, although the Asian ivory syndicates are most destructive buying and shipping tonnes at a time.

Contrary to the advice of CITES that prices may be depressed, and those that supported the sale of stockpiles in 2008, the price of ivory in China has greatly increased. Some believe this may be due to deliberate price fixing by those who bought the stockpile, echoing the warnings from the Japan Wildlife Conservation Society on price-fixing after sales to Japan in 1997, and monopoly given to traders who bought stockpiles from Burundi and Singapore in the 1980s. It may also be due to the exploding number of Chinese able to purchase luxury goods. A study funded by Save the Elephants showed that the price of ivory tripled in China during four years following 2011 when stockpile destruction of ivory became more popular. The same study concluded that this led to increased poaching.

A 2019 peer-reviewed study reported that the rate of African elephant poaching was in decline, with the annual poaching mortality rate peaking at over 10% in 2011 and falling to below 4% by 2017. The study found strong correlations between annual poaching rates in 53 sites and proxies of ivory demand in Chinese markets, as well as associations between variation in poaching rates and indicators of corruption and poverty. Based on these findings, the study authors recommended action to both reduce demand for ivory in China and other main markets and to decrease corruption and poverty in Africa.

In 2012, The New York Times reported on a large upsurge in ivory poaching, with about 70% flowing to China. At the 2014 Tokyo Conference on Combating Wildlife crime, United Nations University and ESRI presented the first case of evidence-based policy-making maps on enforcement and compliance of CITES convention where illegal ivory seizures were mapped out along with poaching incidences

The ivory and rhino horn trade has steadily been a reoccurring problem that dwindled down the population of the African elephants and the white rhino. In 2013, a single seizure in Guangzhou uncovered 1,913 tusks, the product of nearly 1,000 dead animals. In 2014, the Ugandan authorities had 1,355 kilograms (2,987 lb) of ivory, stored in a safe and guarded by police and the army, stolen. At a value of over $1.1 million, it is definitely a cause for concern. This loss was discovered during an audit of the Uganda Wildlife Authority, which has led to an investigation of those who were responsible for safeguarding that amount of ivory. As a result, five of the Wildlife Authority staffers have been suspended so far.

Major centers of ivory trafficking in Vietnam include Mong Cai, Hai Phong and Da Nang. One of the major traffickers of illegal ivory from Togo is a Vietnamese, Dao Van Bien. A 22-month sentence was imposed. In terms of retail trade of elephant ivory, Hong Kong is the largest market in the world, and has been criticised for fueling the slaughter of elephants to meet the demand of customers principally from mainland China. A 101 East report named Hong Kong as "one of the biggest ivory laundering centres in the world [where] legitimate operations are used to mask a far more sinister, more lucrative business". 95 kilograms (209 lb) of elephant ivory was confiscated at Charles de Gaulle Airport in Paris from two Vietnamese who were arrested by French customs.

The Philippines is a major center of the ivory trade with the Philippines priest Monsignor Cristobal Garcia implicated by National Geographic in a scandal over his involvement in the trade.

African elephants ivory has entered Thailand's Asian elephant ivory market.

Massive amounts of ivory are still being imported by Japan.

Vientiane, Laos, is a major venue for Chinese tourists looking to circumvent Chinese restrictions on the sale of ivory. The sale of ivory is done openly, including at San Jiang Market, in the Golden Triangle Special Economic Zone, and in Luang Prabang Province.

In 2018, a study by Avaaz sponsored by Oxford University indicated that legal antique ivory trading in the European Union continues to fuel the poaching of elephants. It is believed that a legal loophole that allows for the trading of old ivory masks the sale of items made of ivory from more recently killed elephants.

==== Source of possible terrorism funding ====
Claims of a link between terrorism and the ivory trade have been made by a number of public officials and media outlets. NGO reports cited an anonymous source within the militant organization Al-Shabaab who claimed that the group engaged in the trafficking of ivory. The claim that Al-Shabaab received up to 40% of its funding from the sale of elephant ivory gained further attention following the 2013 Westgate shopping mall attack in Nairobi, Kenya.

However, a report published jointly by Interpol and the United Nations Environment Programme described these claims as unreliable. According to the report, Al-Shabaab's primary income was from informal taxation and the trade in charcoal, a significant source of deforestation.

It is possible that some Somali poachers paid taxes to Al-Shabaab while smuggling ivory through their territory, representing only a small portion of the group's total income. Somalia was a popular place for illegal trade for it is home and financial support for many terrorist groups. There are still laws in place that support the criminalization of poaching, but similar to all illegal materials, people will always find ways around it.

=== Asian elephant ===
International trade in Asian elephant ivory was banned in 1975 when the Asian elephant was placed on Appendix One of the Convention on the International Trade in Endangered Species (CITES). By the late 1980s, it was believed that only around 50,000 remained in the wild.

There has been little controversy in the decision to ban trade in Asian elephant ivory. However, the species is still threatened by the ivory trade, and many conservationists have supported the African ivory trade ban because evidence shows that ivory traders are not concerned whether their raw material is from Africa or Asia. Decisions by CITES on ivory trade affect Asian elephants. For intricate carving, Asian ivory is often preferred.

=== London Conference on the Illegal Wildlife Trade ===
The London Conference on the Illegal Wildlife Trade was held on 12 and 13 February 2014. The purpose of this conference was to recognize "the significant scale and detrimental economic, social and environmental consequences of the illegal trade in wildlife, make the following political commitment and call upon the international community to act together to bring this to an end." One of the main concerns of the conference was specifically on reevaluating the measures already in place to protect African elephants and the illegal trade of their ivory. While 46 countries signed this agreement, it was reported in 2015 by The Guardian that the elephant poaching crisis was still unimproved. One such article reported "William Hague said the deal would "mark the turning point in the fight to save endangered species and to end the illegal wildlife trade". But wildlife experts and the UK government said on Monday it was too early to judge the effectiveness of the accord."

On 6 October 2017, the UK government announced plans to ban the sales and exportation of ivory in areas of the United Kingdom.

==== 2018 UK Ivory Act ====
On 20 December 2018, the UK Ivory Act 2018, received Royal Assent after being passed by the British parliament. The Act may be extended to include hippos, walruses, and narwhals in the future. The ban, when it comes into effect, has been described one of the "world's toughest" ivory bans and effectively bans the buying and selling of all available form of ivory in the UK bar some narrow exemptions.

== Walrus ivory ==
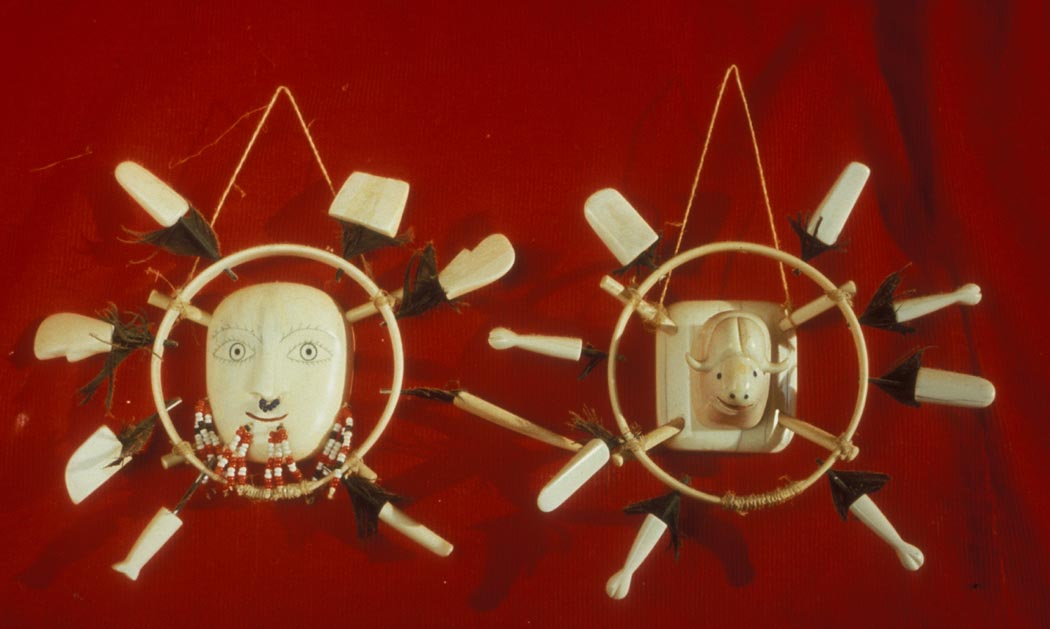
Ceremonial ivory masks produced by Yupik in Alaska

Trade in walrus ivory has taken place for hundreds of years in large regions of the northern hemisphere, involving such groups as the Norse, Russians, other Europeans, the Inuit, and the people of Greenland.

=== North America ===
According to the United States government, Alaska natives (including first nations, Inuit and Aleuts) are allowed to harvest walrus for subsistence as long as the harvesting is not wasteful. The natives are permitted to sell the ivory of the hunted walrus to non–natives as long as it is reported to a United States Fish and Wildlife Service representative, tagged and fashioned into some type of handicraft. Natives may also sell ivory found within 0.25 miles (0.40 km) of the ocean—known as beach ivory— to non–natives if the ivory has been tagged and worked in some way. Fossilized ivory is not regulated, and can be sold without registering, tagging or crafting in any way.

In Greenland, prior to 1897, it was purchased by the Royal Greenland Trade Department exclusively for sale domestically. After that time, walrus ivory was exported.

Walrus ivory was used to create pieces of art and specifically chess pieces in the Middle Ages. Narwhal horns, mainly from Greenland, were sold in Europe as unicorn horn.

Authentic carving of marine mammal ivory is a protected cultural practice for Arctic Indigenous peoples in the US, but research led by EcoVerde Global Consulting found that raw walrus tusks and bone from the US have been illegally exported to Bali (Indonesia), to be carved by local craftsmen and smuggled back to the US market

=== Bering Strait fur trade network ===
In the nineteenth century, Bering Strait Inuit traded, among other things, walrus ivory to the Chinese, for glass beads and iron goods. Prior to this, the Bering Strait Inuit used ivory for practical reasons; harpoon points, tools, etc., but about the only time(s) walrus ivory was used otherwise, it was to make games for festivities, and for children's toys.

=== Russia ===
Moscow is a major hub for the trade in walrus ivory, providing the commodity for a large foreign market.

== Narwhal ivory ==
=== Greenland ===
The people of Greenland likely traded narwhal ivory amongst themselves before any contact with Europeans. For hundreds of years, the tusks have moved from Greenland to international markets.

In the 1600s, the Dutch traded with the Inuit, typically for metal goods in exchange for narwhal tusks, seal skins, and other items.

Trading continues today between Greenland and other countries, with Denmark by far being the leading purchaser.

=== Canada ===
There is an international export ban of narwhal tusks from 17 Nunavut communities imposed by the Canadian federal government. The Inuit traders in this region are challenging the ban by filing an application with the Federal Court. The Canadian Department of Fisheries and Oceans restricts the export of narwhal tusks and other related products from these communities, including Iqaluit, the territorial capital.

Tusks in good condition are valued at up to $450 per metre. The ban affects both carvings and raw tusks.

The Canadian government has stated that if it fails to restrict export of narwhal tusks, then the international community might completely ban exports under CITES.

Tusks are still allowed to be traded within Canada.

== Mammoth ivory ==
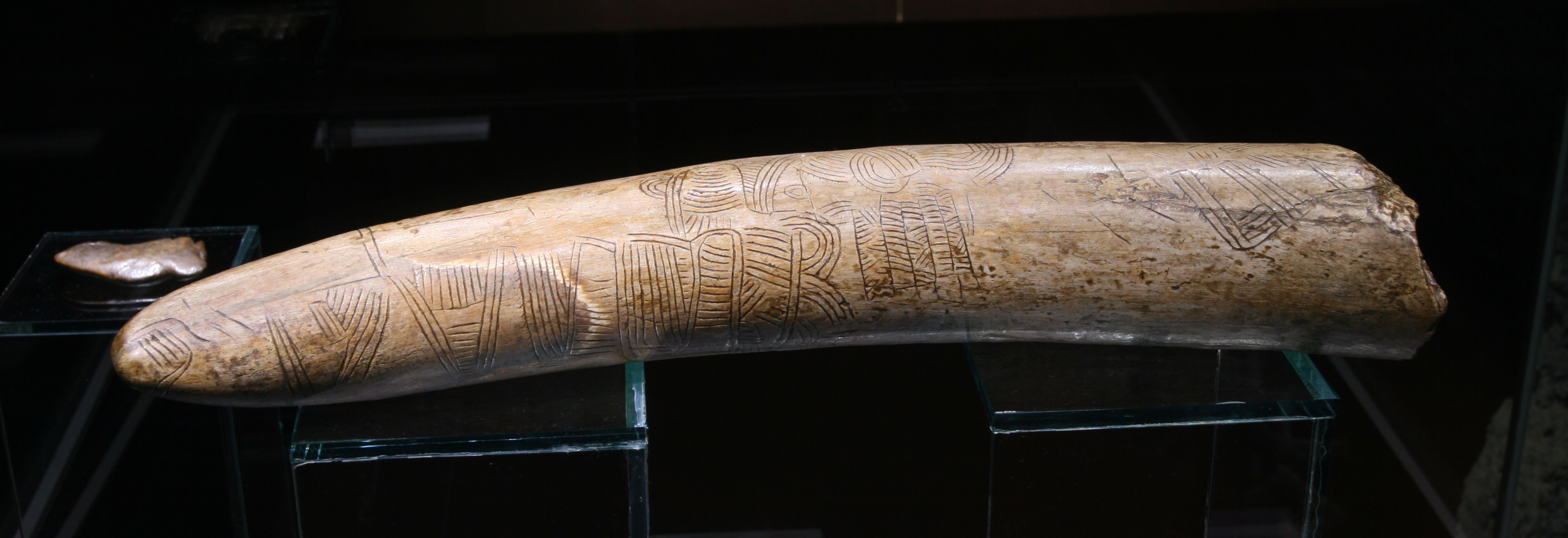
Engraved mammoth tusk

The first known instance of mammoth ivory reaching western Europe was in 1611, when a piece, purchased from Samoyeds in Siberia, reached London.

After 1582, when Russia conquered Siberia, the ivory became a more regularly available commodity. Siberia's mammoth ivory industry experienced substantial growth from the mid-18th century on. In one instance, in 1821, a collector brought 8,165 kg (18,001 lb) of ivory, from approximately 50 mammoths, back from the New Siberian Islands.

It is estimated that 46,750 mammoths have been excavated during the first 250 years since Siberia became part of Russia.

In the early 19th century mammoth ivory was used, as substantial source, for such products as piano keys, billiard balls, and ornamental boxes.

In 1998, over 300 mammoth tusks were discovered in an underground ice cave in the Taimyr Peninsula in North Siberia. These fossils and tusks were studied up to 2003, until 24 of them were stolen and transported to Russia. The suspect was eventually caught and arrested, but there was too much damage done to continue studying these mammoth tusks.

== See also ==
- African Wildlife Foundation
- Destruction of ivory
- Environmental crime
- Elephants in Thailand
- Synthetic ivory: may decrease ivory prices due to greater availability (see Supply and demand)
