= Ouadi Rimé-Ouadi Achim Faunal Reserve =

Protected area in Chad

Ouadi-Rimé Ouadi-Hachim Faunal Reserve
- IUCN category IV (habitat/species management area)
- Location within Chad
- Location: Chad
- Nearest city: Batha, Chad
- Coordinates: 15°31′00″N 19°40′00″E
- Area: 77,950 km^{2} (30,100 sq mi)
- Established: 1969

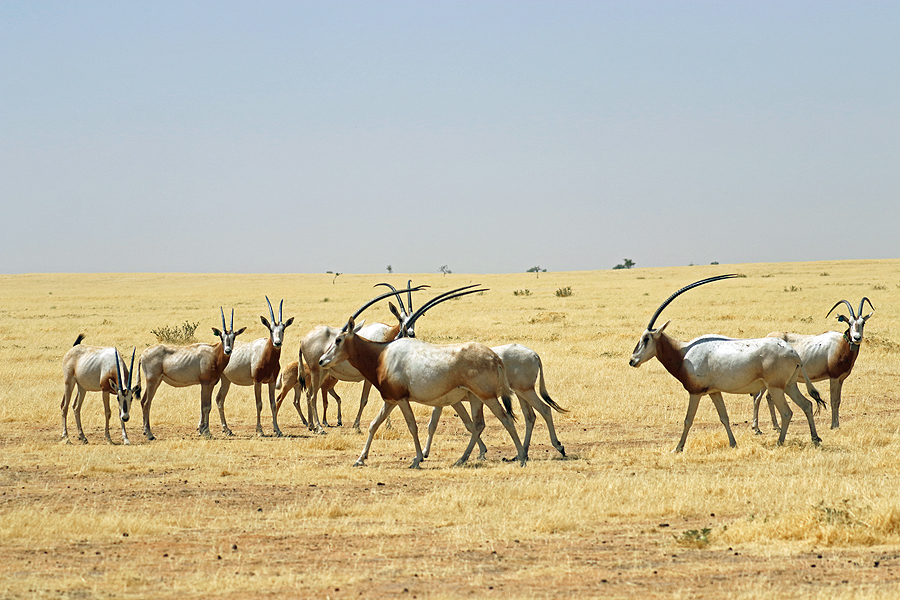
Wild Scimitar-horned Oryx in Ouadi Rimé-Ouadi Achim Faunal Reserve in Chad, in 2022

Ouadi-Rimé Ouadi-Hachim Faunal Reserve, is located in the Batha administrative region in the centre of Chad. It is an IUCN Category IV area, which was established in 1969. At 77,950 km^{2} (30,100 sq mi) – equivalent to the size of Scotland – it is one of the largest reserves in the world.

== Geography ==
The Ouadi Rimé–Ouadi Achim, covering three habitats of Sahelian wooded grassland, sub-desert grassland (covers about 66% of the area), and desert, and is one of the largest reserves in Chad. Its terrain, with an elevation range of 180–250 m (590–820 ft), has no prominent features except for an isolated patch of a remnant of volcanic eruption. It has a long line of dunes called the Goz Kerky that runs through the reserve in a north–south direction. The eastern part of the reserve has massifs which rise to a height of 1,500 m (4,900 ft) which drain a number of streams that flow through the reserve. The reserve also has flood plains which are inundated temporarily and along with the streams help in creation of the biodiversity of the reserve.

Rainfall in the reserve mostly during July–September varies widely with the Sahelian wooded grassland recording a mean annual rainfall in the range of 105–980 millimetres (4.1–38.6 in), the sub-desert grassland zone recording rainfall in the range of 43–570 mm (2–22 in) and the desert with scanty rainfall in the range of 0–73 mm (0–3 in).

== Flora ==
Senegalia senegal, Balanites aegyptiaca, Combretum glutinosum and Boscia senegalensis are the plant types in the Sahelian grassland. Plant species Aristida mutabilis, Chloris prieurii and Cenchrus biflorus, herbs Limeum viscosum, Indigofera hochstetteri and Blepharis linariifolia are recorded in the desert zone; the dune depressions have Vachellia tortilis. Also noted are clumps of Cornulaca monacantha in the deserts.

== Fauna ==
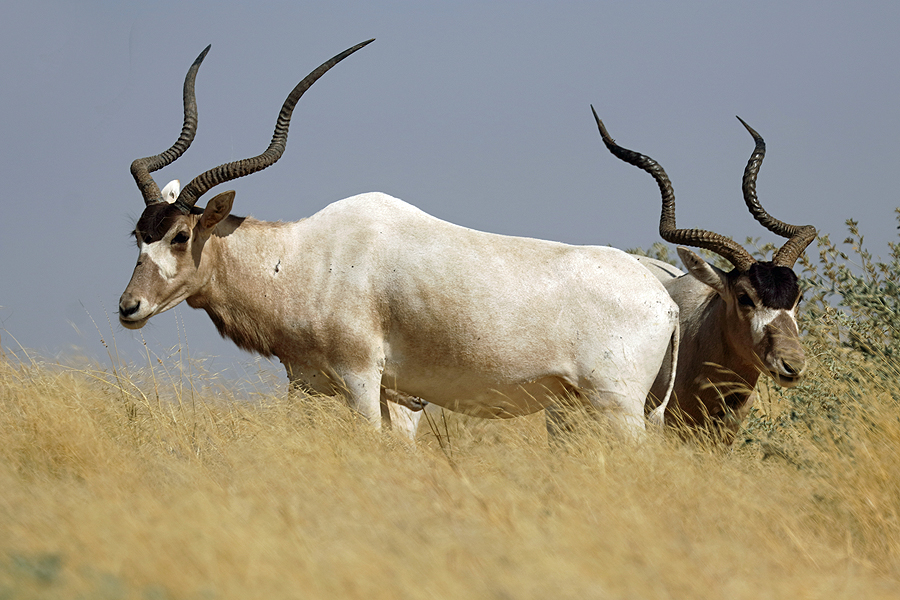
Wild addax Ouadi Rimé-Ouadi Achim Faunal Reserve (2022)

Faunal species noted are dama gazelle, Dorcas gazelle, red-fronted gazelle, Northeast African cheetah and addax, but the presence of the last two is in doubt. The scimitar oryx had its last stronghold in this reserve before eventually becoming extinct in the wild. Subsequently, a reintroduction program for the species selected Ouadi Rimé-Ouadi Achim to reintroduce it in the wild; as a result, since 2016, a small herd is living within the reserve limits. Following on from the oryx reintroduction addax were reintroduced starting in 2019

Some 267 bird species, including three species of the Sudan–Guinea Savanna biome, have been recorded. During the rainy season migrant Palearctic waterbirds flock to the streams in large numbers. The reserve has been designated an Important Bird Area (IBA) by BirdLife International.

== Conservation ==
Though created primarily to protect the fauna in the reserve there are hardly any personnel posted for the purpose. The problem of water shortage due to the reduced incidence of rainfall has been answered by the provision of deep tube wells as water sources. However, hunting is widely prevalent. Falconers from Persian Gulf states, who used to visit the reserve to hunt bustards and gazelles, have been prevented from doing so because of local resistance. In July 2025 the Chadian Ministry of Environment, Fisheries and Sustainable Development signed a renewable ten-year management agreement with the Sahara Conservation they will hire and train a force of 40 rangers, ensuring that the reserve is much better protected.
