= Bou-Hedma National Park =

National park in Tunisia

- IUCN category II (national park)
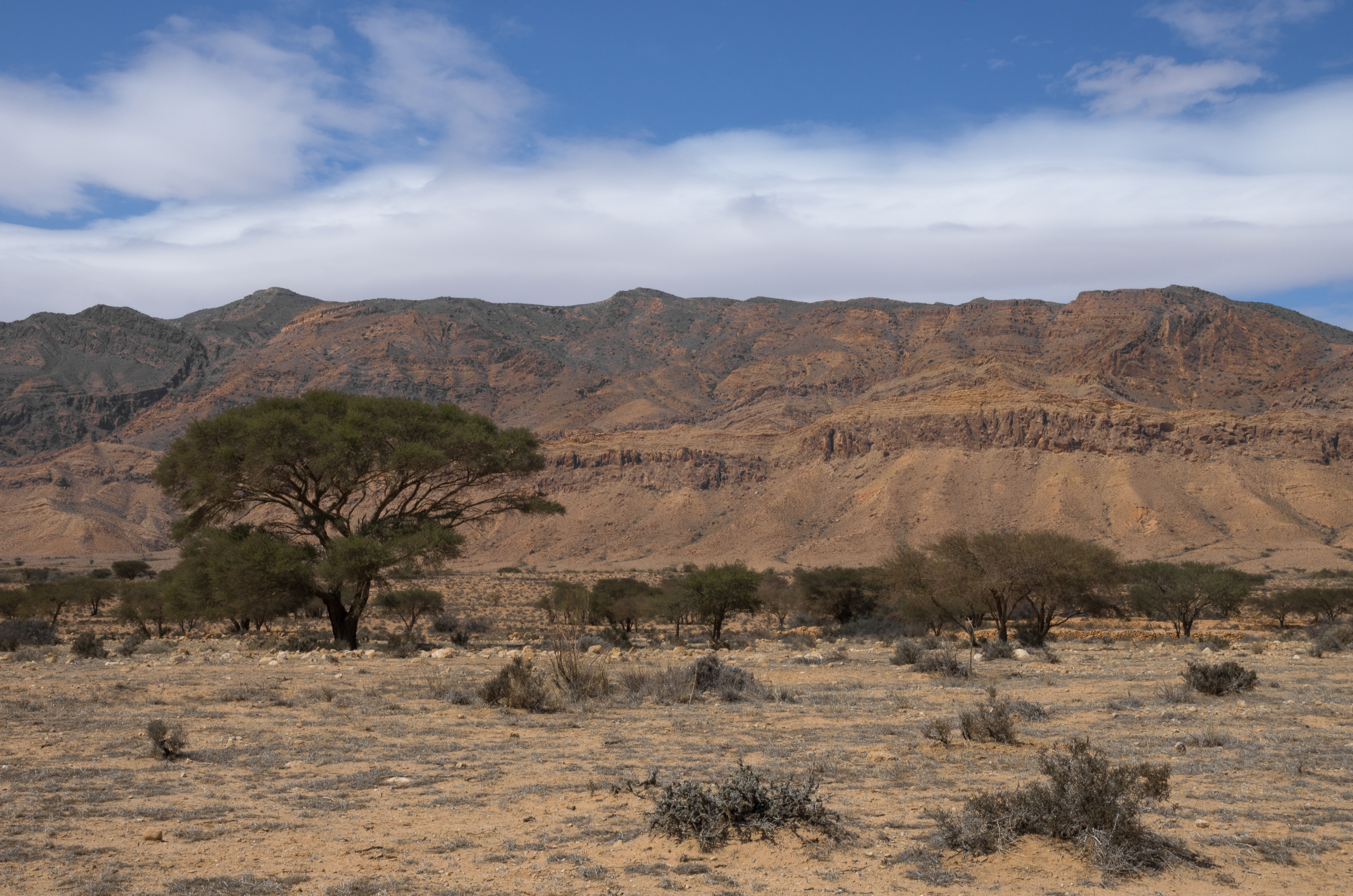

- Location within Tunisia
- Location: Tunisia
- Nearest city: Gafsa, Sidi Bouzid
- Coordinates: 34°28′31″N 9°38′57″E
- Established: 1980

Ramsar Wetland
- Official name: Sebkhet Noual
- Designated: 11 July 2007
- Reference no.: 1711

Bou-Hedma National Park is located in both the Gafsa Governorate and Sidi Bouzid Governorate, in Tunisia. The park was created on 18 December 1980, and has been on the UNESCO tentative list of World Heritage Sites since 28 May 2008

The national park is mainly important because of its flora and fauna. Endangered species that have been reintroduced here include scimitar oryx (Oryx dammah), addax (Addax nasomaculatus), North African ostrich (Struthio camelus camelus) and dama gazelle (Gazella dama mhorr).

Bou-Hedma is an important archaeological site. It includes, among others, the remains of ancient Roman settlements, such as Roman villages, the Roman bridge of Wadi Bautista, the ancient Roman pools and the rest of the Roman aqueduct.
