= Algazel =

Algazel may refer to:

- Al-Ghazali, an 11th century Persian philosopher
- Scimitar oryx, originally described as Oryx algazel
