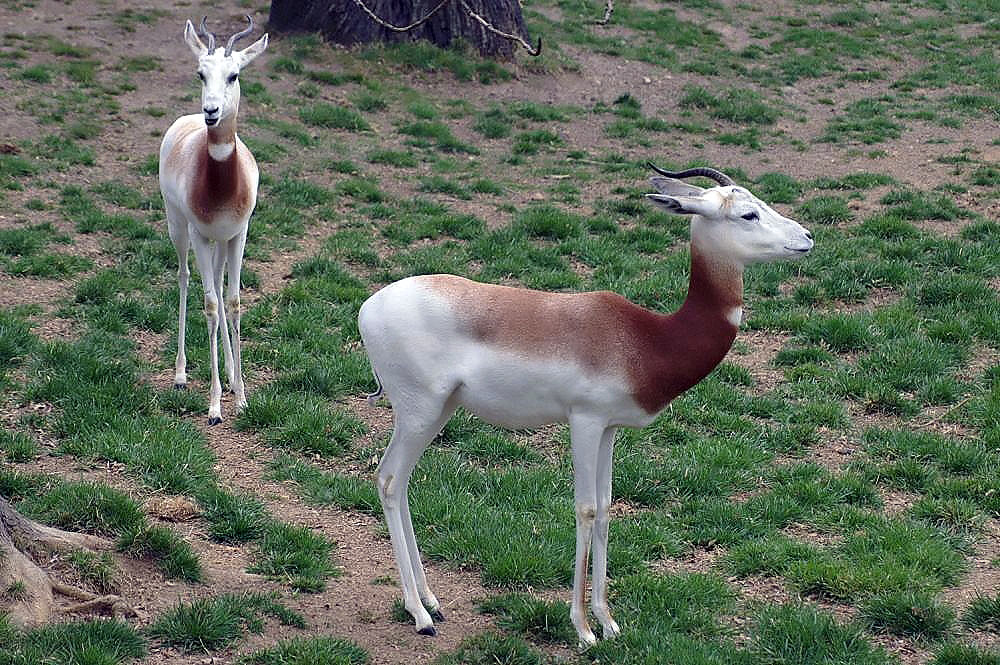
- Addra gazelle (N. d. ruficollis) at Maryland Zoo in Baltimore, Maryland
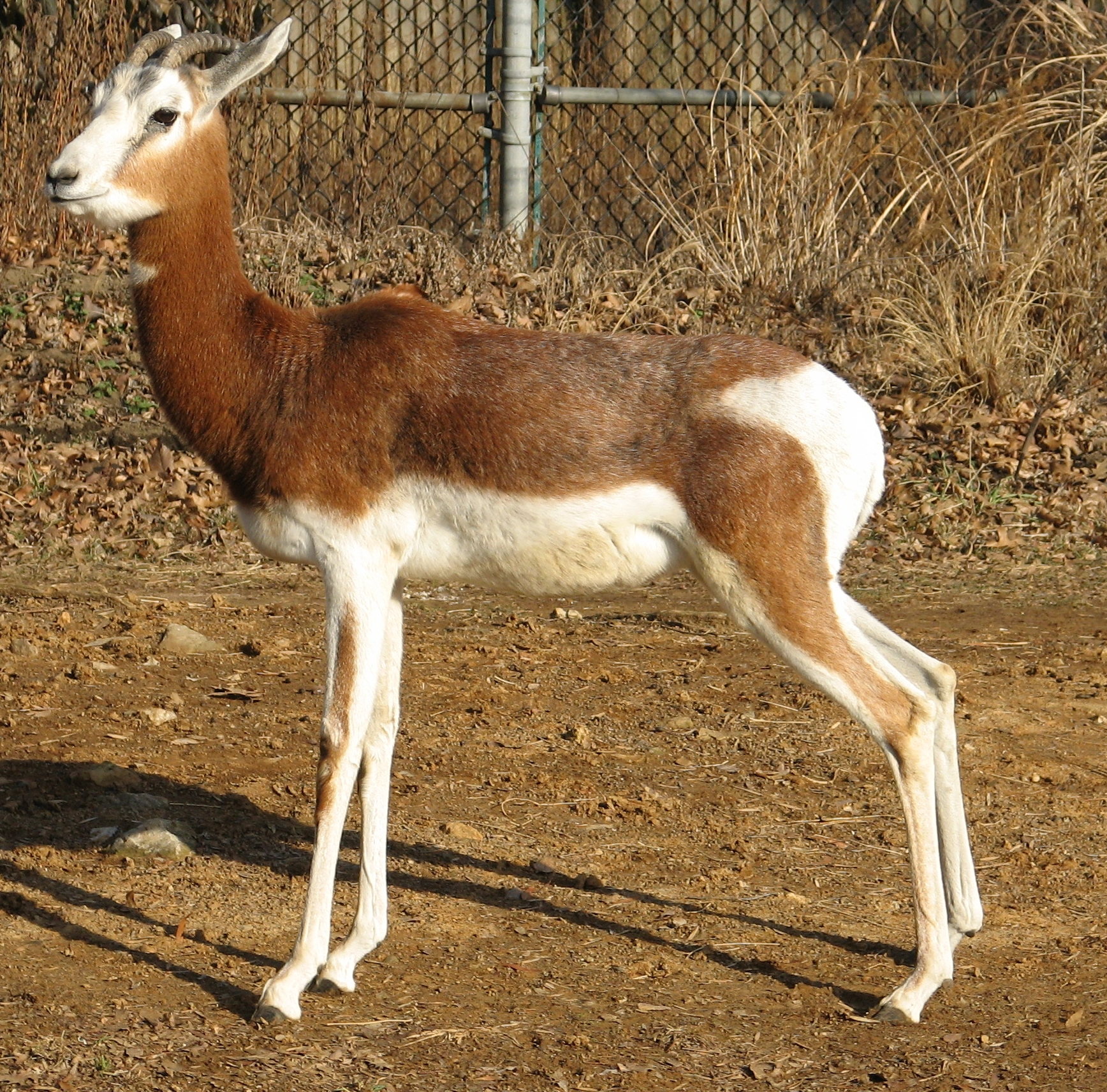
- Mhorr gazelle (N. d. mhorr) at Louisville Zoo in Louisville, Kentucky

Conservation status
- Critically Endangered (IUCN 3.1)
- CITES Appendix I

Scientific classification
- Kingdom: Animalia
- Phylum: Chordata
- Class: Mammalia
- Order: Artiodactyla
- Family: Bovidae
- Subfamily: Antilopinae
- Genus: Nanger
- Species: N. dama

Binomial name
- Nanger dama (Pallas, 1766)

Subspecies
- N. dama dama (dama); N. dama mhorr (mhorr); N. dama ruficollis (addra); also see text
- Geographic range

Synonyms
- Antilope dama Pallas, 1766; Gazella dama (Pallas, 1766)

= Dama gazelle =

Species of mammal

The dama gazelle (Nanger dama), also known as the addra gazelle or mhorr gazelle, is a species of gazelle. It lives in Africa, in the Sahara desert and the Sahel. A critically endangered species, it has disappeared from most of its former range due to overhunting and habitat loss, and natural populations only remain in Chad, Mali, and Niger. Its habitat includes grassland, shrubland, semi-deserts, open savanna and mountain plateaus. Its diet includes shrubs, herbs, grasses, leaves (especially Acacia leaves), shoots, and fruit.

In Niger, the dama gazelle has become a national symbol. Under the Hausa name mayna or ménas, the dama gazelle appears on the badge of the Niger national football team, who are popularly called the Maynas or Ménas.

== Description ==
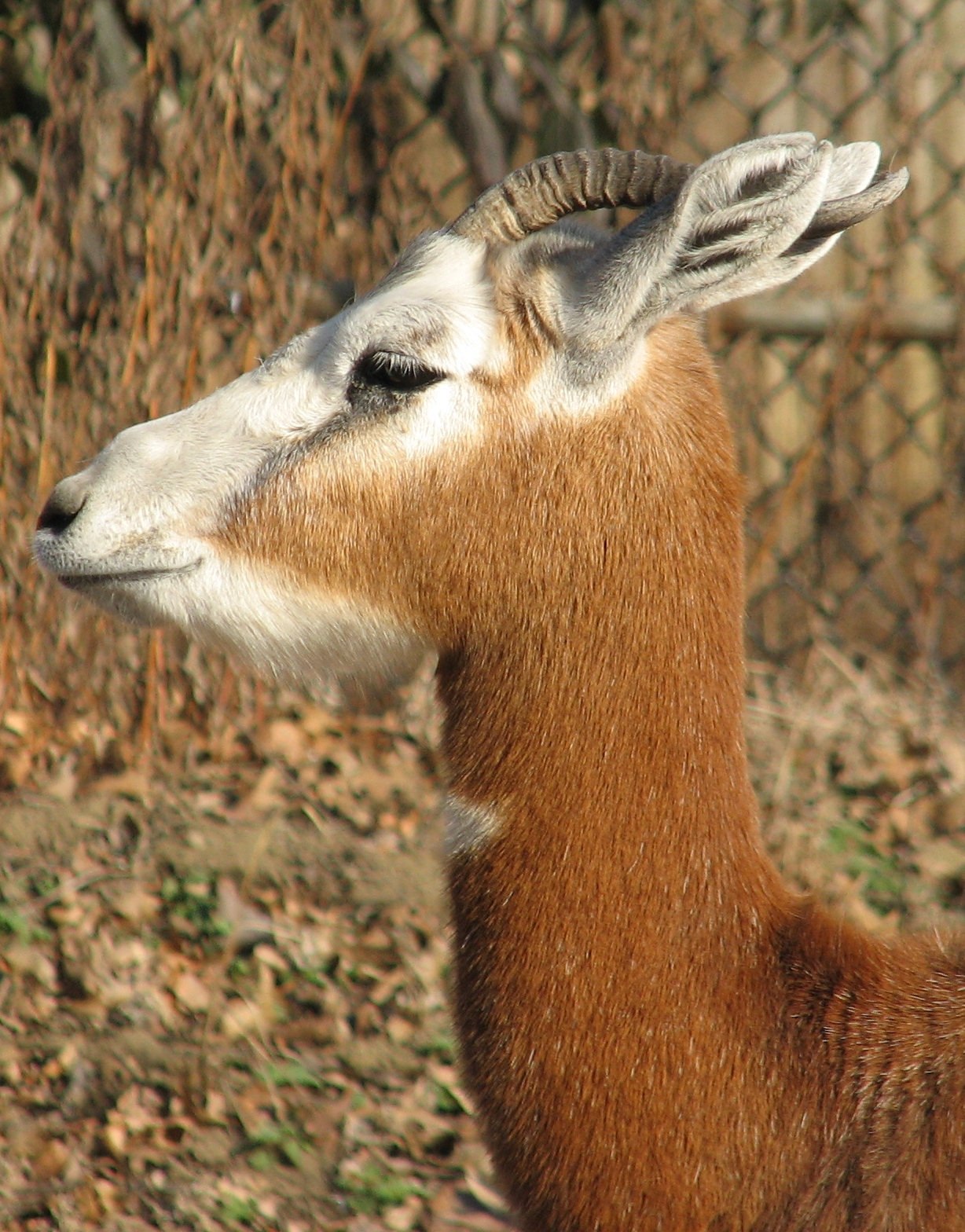
Close-up of the head of a mhorr gazelle (N. d. mhorr)

The dama gazelle is white with a reddish-brown head and neck. Both sexes usually have medium-length ringed horns curved like an "S". Males' horns are about 35 cm (14 in) long, while females' horns are much shorter. The head is small with a narrow muzzle, and the eyes are relatively large. It has a longer neck and longer legs than most gazelles. It is between 90 and 95 cm (35 and 37 in) tall at the shoulder, weighs between 35 and 75 kg (77 and 165 lb), and has a lifespan up to 12 years in the wild or 18 in captivity. A few days following birth, dama young are strong enough to follow the herd, and after a week, they are able to run as fast as the adults. The dama gazelle is considered the largest species of gazelle, with incredibly long legs, which provide extra surface area to dissipate heat, one of the many ways it stays cool in its hot desert environment. It also tends to need more water than some of its desert relatives, but it can withstand fairly long periods of drought. Unlike many other desert mammals, the dama gazelle is a diurnal species, meaning it is active during the day. Always on the alert, the dama gazelle uses a behavior called pronking to warn herd members of danger. Pronking involves the animal hopping up and down with all four of its legs stiff, so that its limbs all leave and touch the ground at the same time. Males also establish territories, and during breeding season, they actively exclude other mature males. They mark their territories with urine and dung piles and secretions from glands near their eyes.

== Subspecies status and conservation ==
The dama gazelle is generally divided into three subspecies based on the colour of the animal's back, flanks and haunches. These three subspecies occupied three blocks running along the east–west axis of the gazelle's range. The easternmost is N. dama ruficollis (the addra gazelle) whose historical range was to the east of 15°E. The westernmost is N. dama mhorr (the mohor or mhorr gazelle) whose historical range was to the west of 7°E. Between the two was the historical range of N. dama dama. Genetic studies have raised questions over the validity of these subspecies and the colour variation (phenotype) appears to be clinal.

- N. d. mhorr, the mhorr gazelle, is extinct in the wild, with the last known wild sighting in 1968. It is currently present in captive breeding programs in Europe, North Africa and the Middle East, and several efforts have reintroduced animals into former areas and others with a similar habitat.
- N. d. dama (the nominate subspecies) is only kept in captivity at the Al Ain Zoo and Sharjah Safari Park in the United Arab Emirates, and is very rare in the wild.
- N. d. ruficollis, the addra gazelle, is present in captive breeding programs in North America, and is equally rare in the wild.
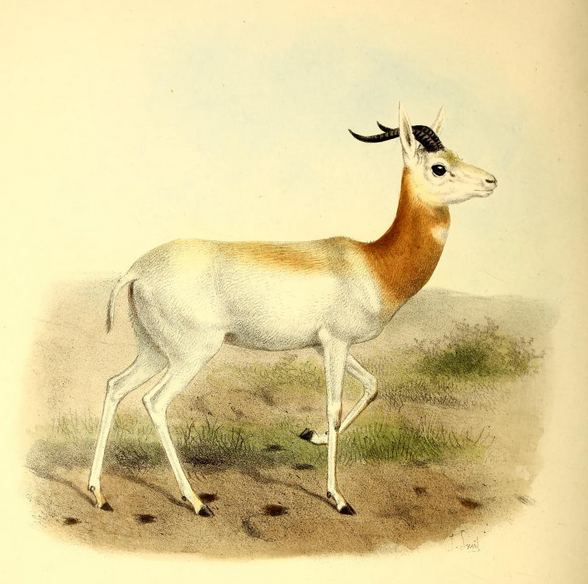
Illustration of N. d. ruficollis

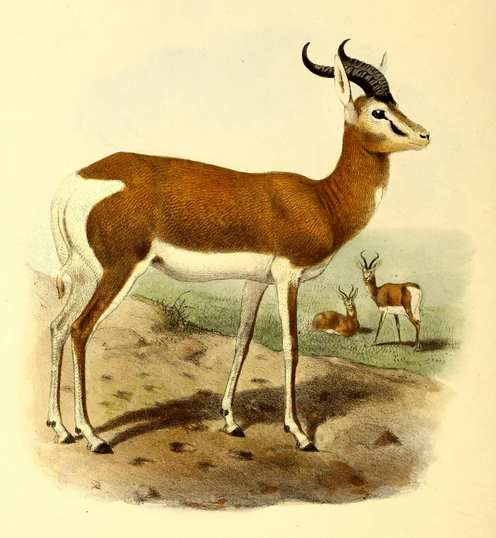
Illustration of N. d. mhorr

The numbers of this species in the wild have fallen by 80% over the last decade. As of 2015, the IUCN lists it as critically endangered with a wild population of no more than 250. It occurs in poor countries and little action is taken to protect the species. The national parks are not well guarded, and poaching still occurs. It has been extirpated from Libya, Mauritania, Morocco and Nigeria. Populations remain in Chad, Mali and Niger, and it has been reintroduced in Senegal and Tunisia.

== Threats to survival ==
=== Biological threats ===
The Dama gazelle does not need a lot of water, but it needs more than other desert animals. It is not as resistant and perishes from a lack of water during the drought season. The environment has become ill-suited for it. Habitat pressure from pastoral activity is another reason for decline, as are introduced diseases from livestock.

=== Human threats ===
Another reason for the decline of the dama gazelle is habitat destruction. Humans cut down the branches of the trees on which this gazelle feeds. As a result, the trees die and the gazelle cannot eat. Human threats are the most dangerous of threats to the dama gazelle. The main reason this species of gazelle is endangered is because of mechanized hunting; hunters using vehicles increase its decline. Civil unrest, for instance in Sudan, also negatively affects the life of the dama gazelle. Since the gazelle is already having a hard time surviving, these conditions have made its habitat unsuitable. A potential threat the dama gazelle faces is tourism. Tourists want to take pictures of this endangered species, and in doing so, may be perceived as a threat, especially during the hot season. Gazelles will run away from perceived danger, and in the hot season may overheat and die of stress.

== Conservation efforts ==
Relatively few actions have been taken in the conservation of the dama gazelle. The few measures that have been taken are reserves so the animal can live in a peaceful environment and captive breeding to help rebuild the populations.

A reserve for mhorr gazelles was set up in 1971 to help avoid extinction. This reserve, Parque de Rescate de la Fauna Sahariana (Rescue Park for Saharan Fauna) of the Estación Experimental de Zonas Áridas (Experimental Station of Arid Zones), is in Spain. The reserve has been a success and is still around today.

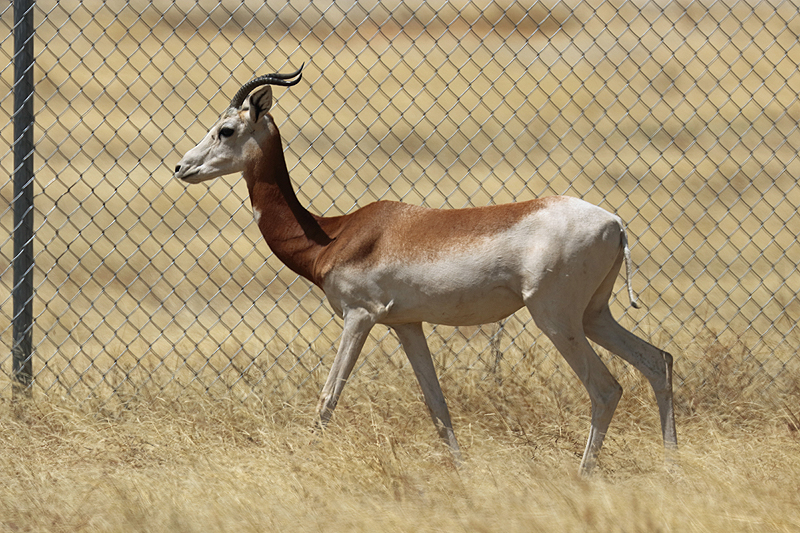
Captive dama gazelle in Ouadi Rime-Ouadi Achime Faunal Reserve in Chad

Another reserve for the mhorr subspecies was set up in Chad, the Ouadi Rime-Ouadi Achime Faunal Reserve. This reserve was effective from 1978 to 1987, but due to civil war, it was abandoned for a significant period. during the fighting the last known wild population of the scimitar oryx was extirpated, attempts to re-establish conservation in the reserve started in the early 2000s and were stepped up in 2008 as Sahara Conservation started to plan the reintroduction of scimitar oryx, their involvement led to better protection of all the reserve's wildlife, but the population of around 50 dama gazelles, was not growing in spite of this, to address the situation an in-situ captive breeding herd was established, in January 2020 three female gazelles rescued from a doomed population in the Manga region of Western Chad were flown in a male from the reserve was captured to join them, two more gazelles were brought from Manga and over time more gazelles from the reserve were added and five captive bred dama gazelles were also flown in, from the Deleika Wildlife Conservation Centre in Abu Dhabi, after growing to 29, in 2023 6 gazelles were satellite tagged and released into the reserve.

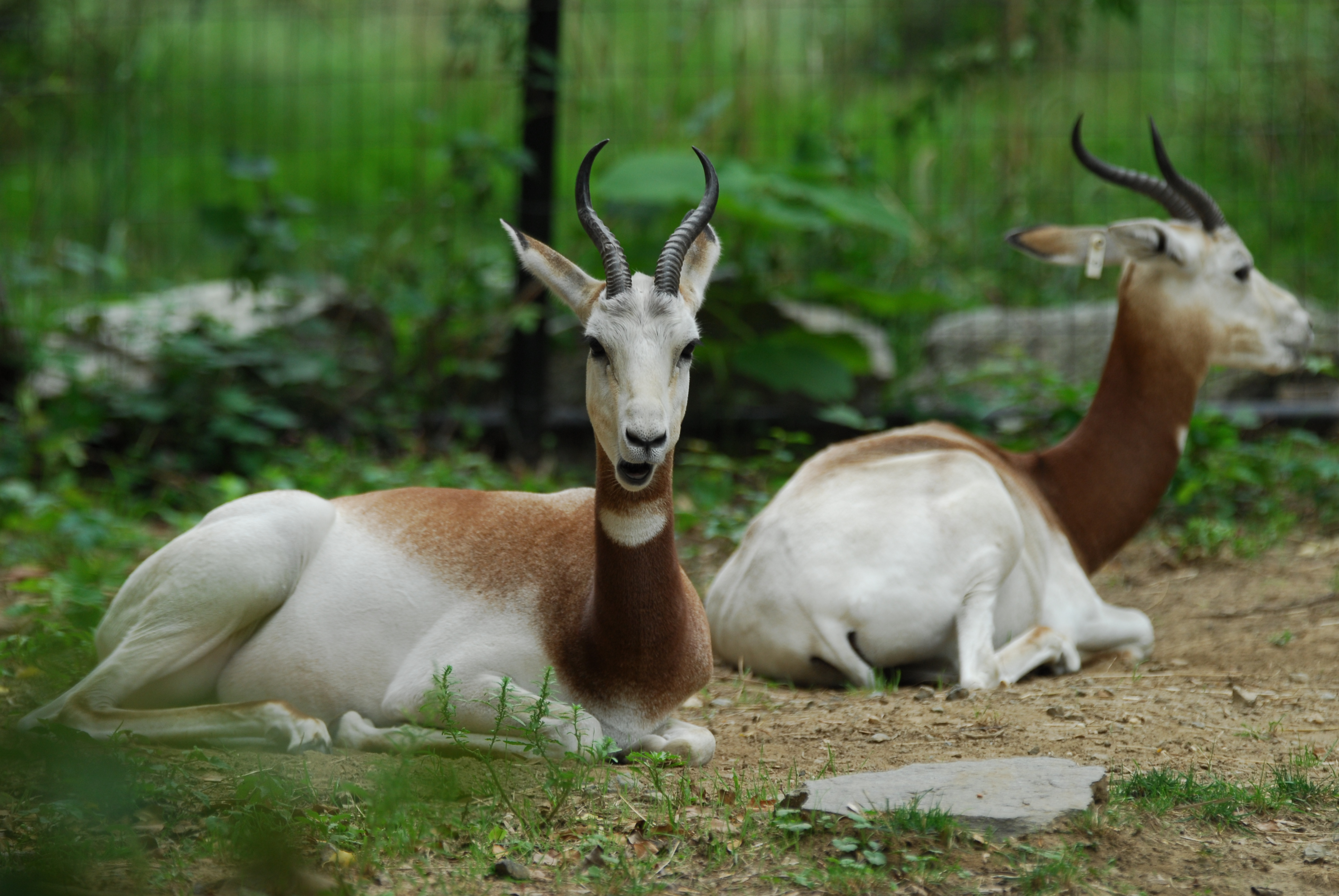
Addra gazelles, part of the breeding program at the National Zoo in Washington, D.C.

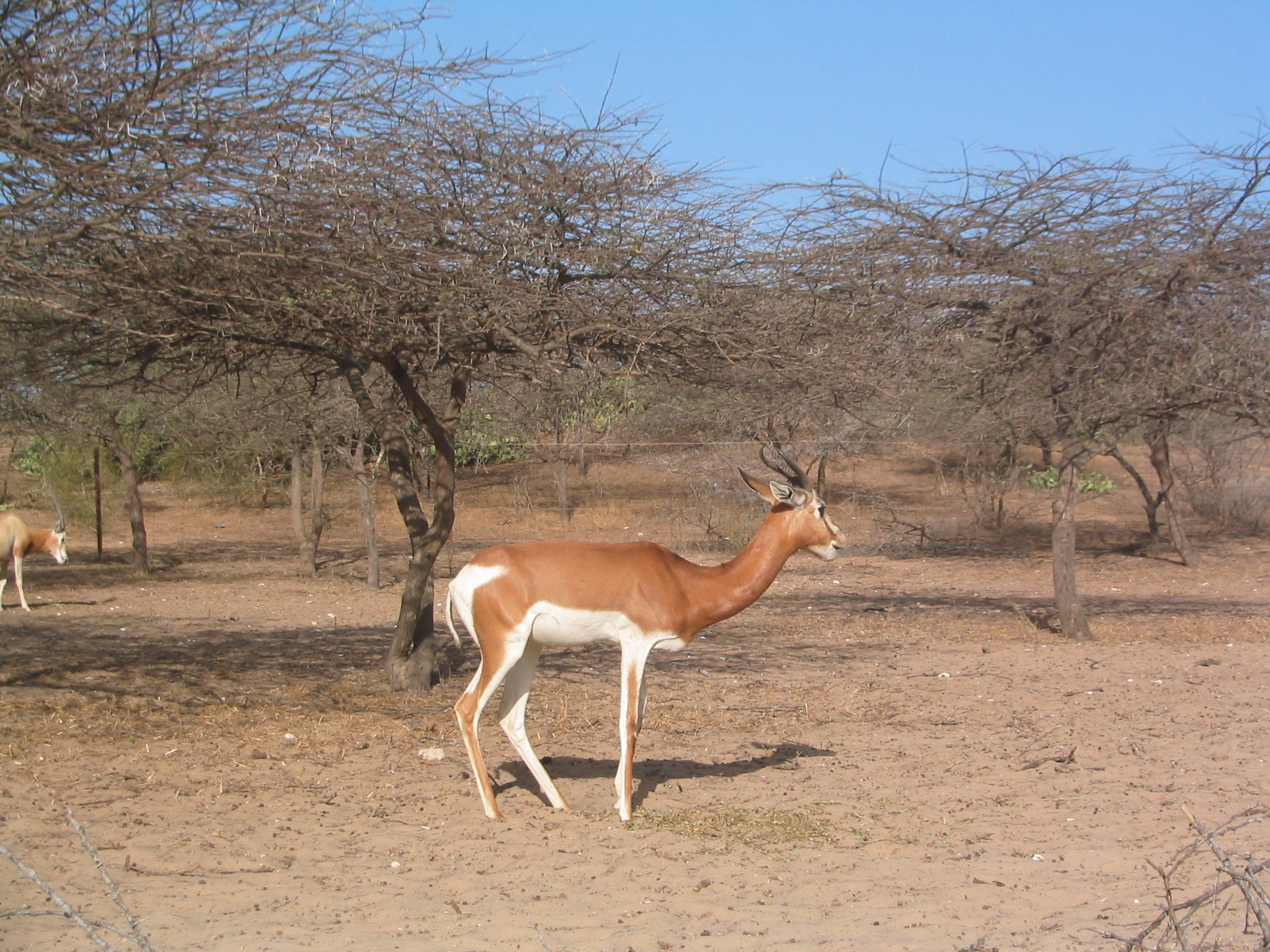
At Guembeul Natural Reserve, Sénégal

Captive breeding is a very popular way to help an endangered species repopulate. The species reproduces in captivity, but the small founder population potentially presents a problem and may result in inbreeding. The primary focus of European EAZA zoos is the mhorr gazelle (N. d. mhorr), while the primary focus of North American AZA zoos is the addra gazelle (N. d. ruficollis). Mhorr gazelles are also kept in North African facilities and both subspecies are kept in the Middle East. These are maintained as part of the European Endangered Species Programme and Species Survival Plan. The studbooks include 293 mhorr (2014) and 168 addra gazelles (2012). One participant in the addra gazelle plan, White Oak Conservation in Yulee, Florida, has bred the gazelles since 1983, resulting in nearly 300 births. Several hundred additional animals that are not managed as part of the studbooks are kept privately, especially in Texas.

Small population size and inbreeding are a serious concern in this population due to the increased parasite load and reduced reproductive viability. Few substantial in situ conservation efforts have been mounted due to the political situation in their currently fragmented habitat. The survival of this species in the wild depends on more reserves being created in the Sahelian and Saharan zones and better protection in the reserves that do exist. As the population deteriorates, researchers in 2008 stressed the need for healthy captive population and for help to preserve their habitats in the wild.

In 2015, a reintroduction project was conducted in the Western Saharan territory of Morocco, in the Safia Natural Reserve close to the border with Mauritania. Twenty-four gazelles were released in a semi-enclosed facility, seven of which were monitored with telemetry collars. During the course of the project, animals experienced a poaching event, resulting in the deaths of three animals. Additionally, seven animals were killed by domestic dogs from nearby military outposts, suggesting that the animals do not recognize potential predators. This milestone project proved that reintroduction of wild animals in this part of the world is extremely difficult despite the favourable sentiment of the majority of local communities.

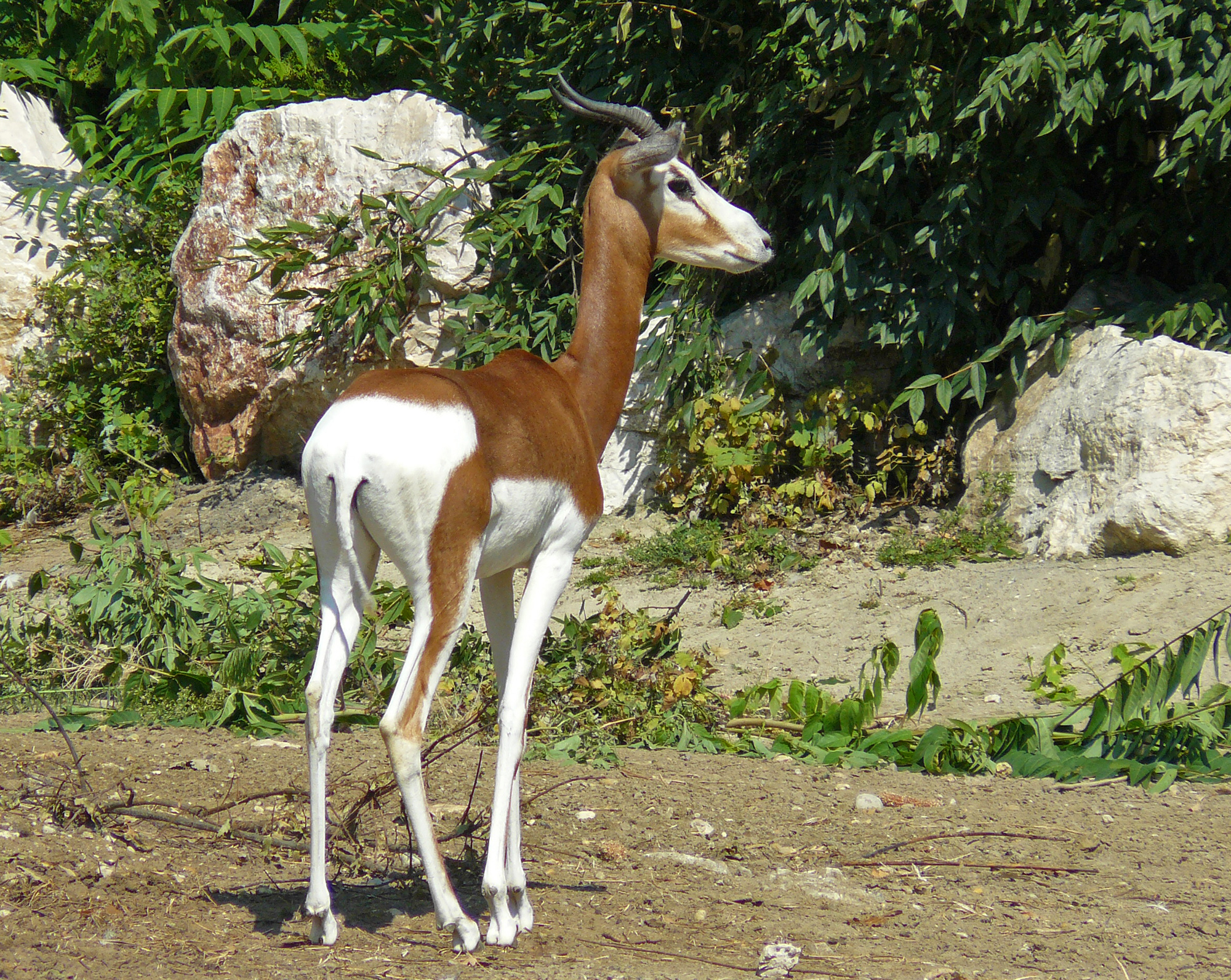
Budapest Zoo and Botanical Garden, Hungary

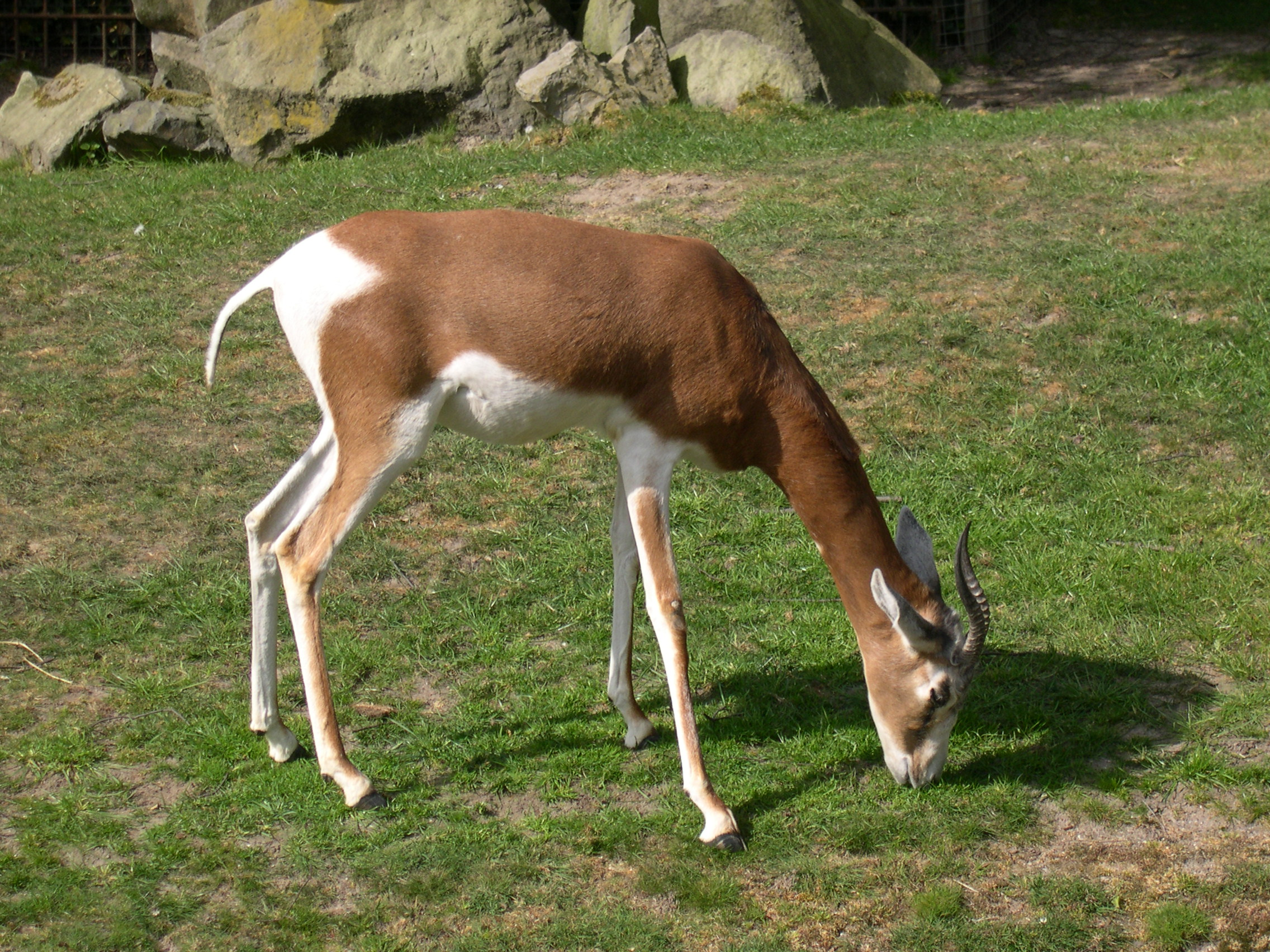
Rotterdam Zoo, the Netherlands

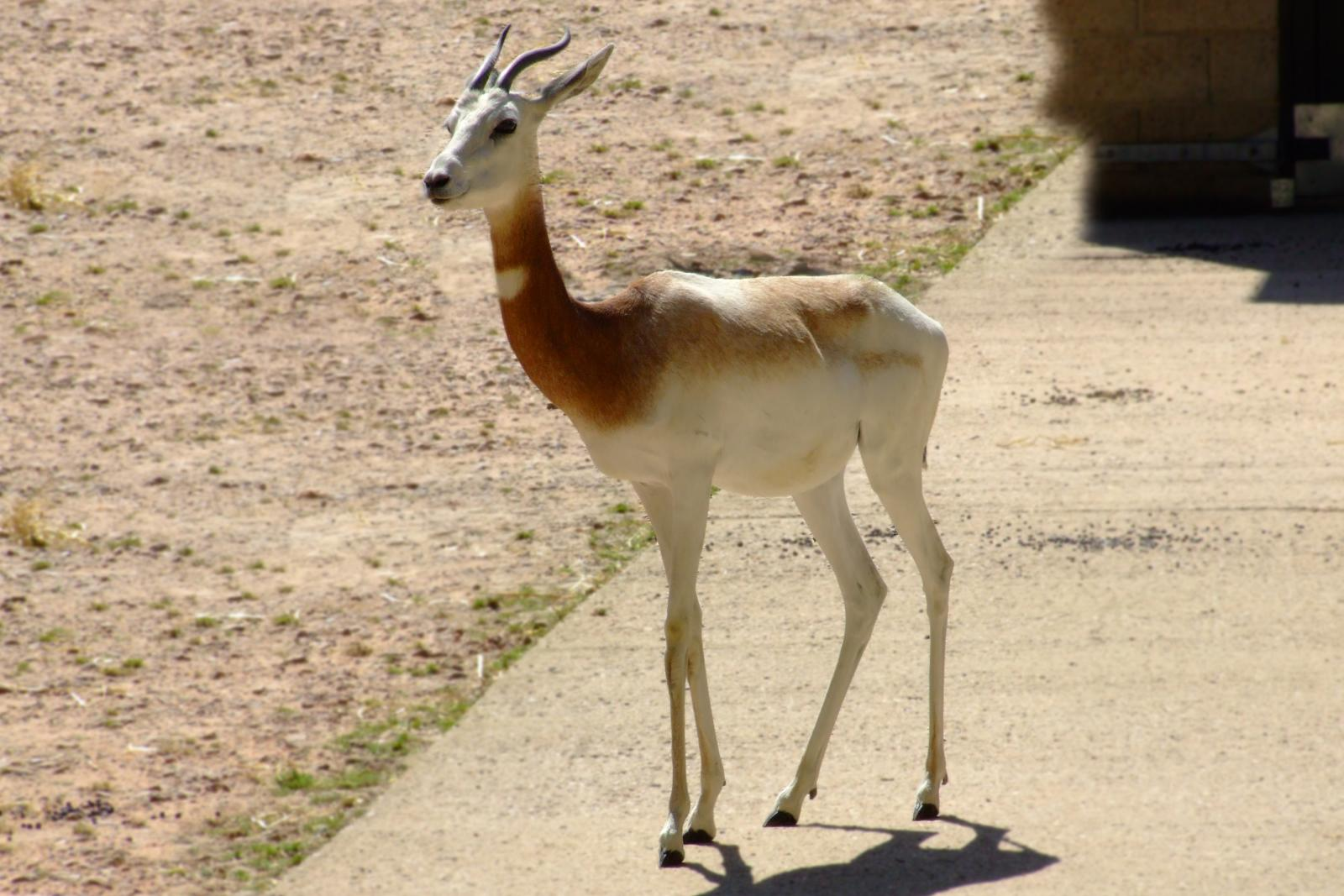
Marwell Zoo, Hampshire, UK

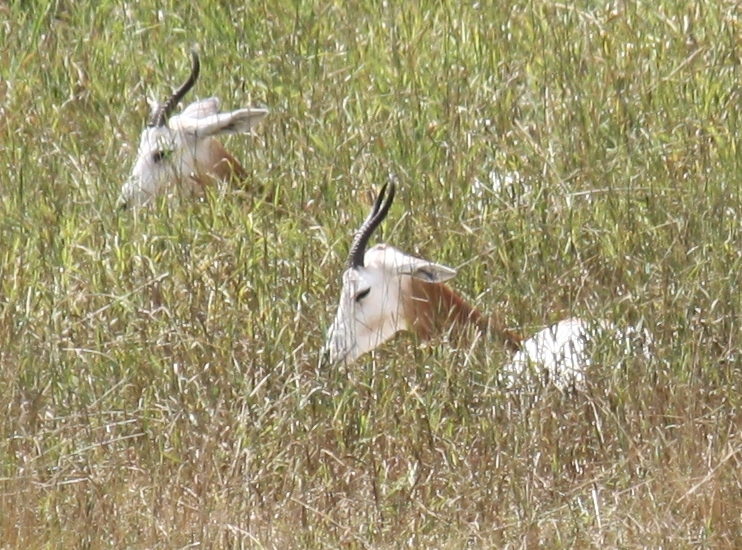
Addra gazelle at Binder Park Zoo, Battle Creek, Michigan, U.S.

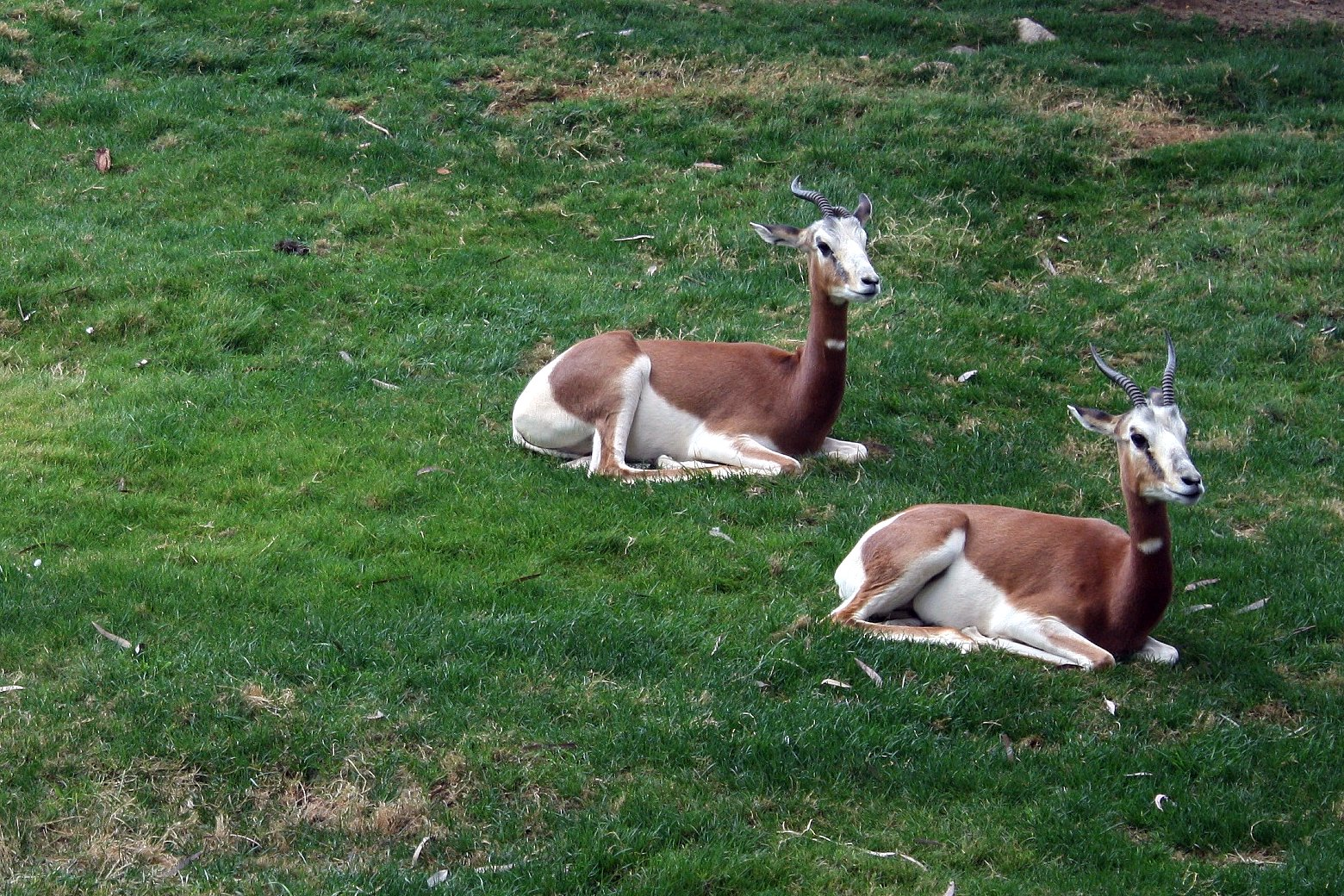
Phoenix Zoo, Arizona

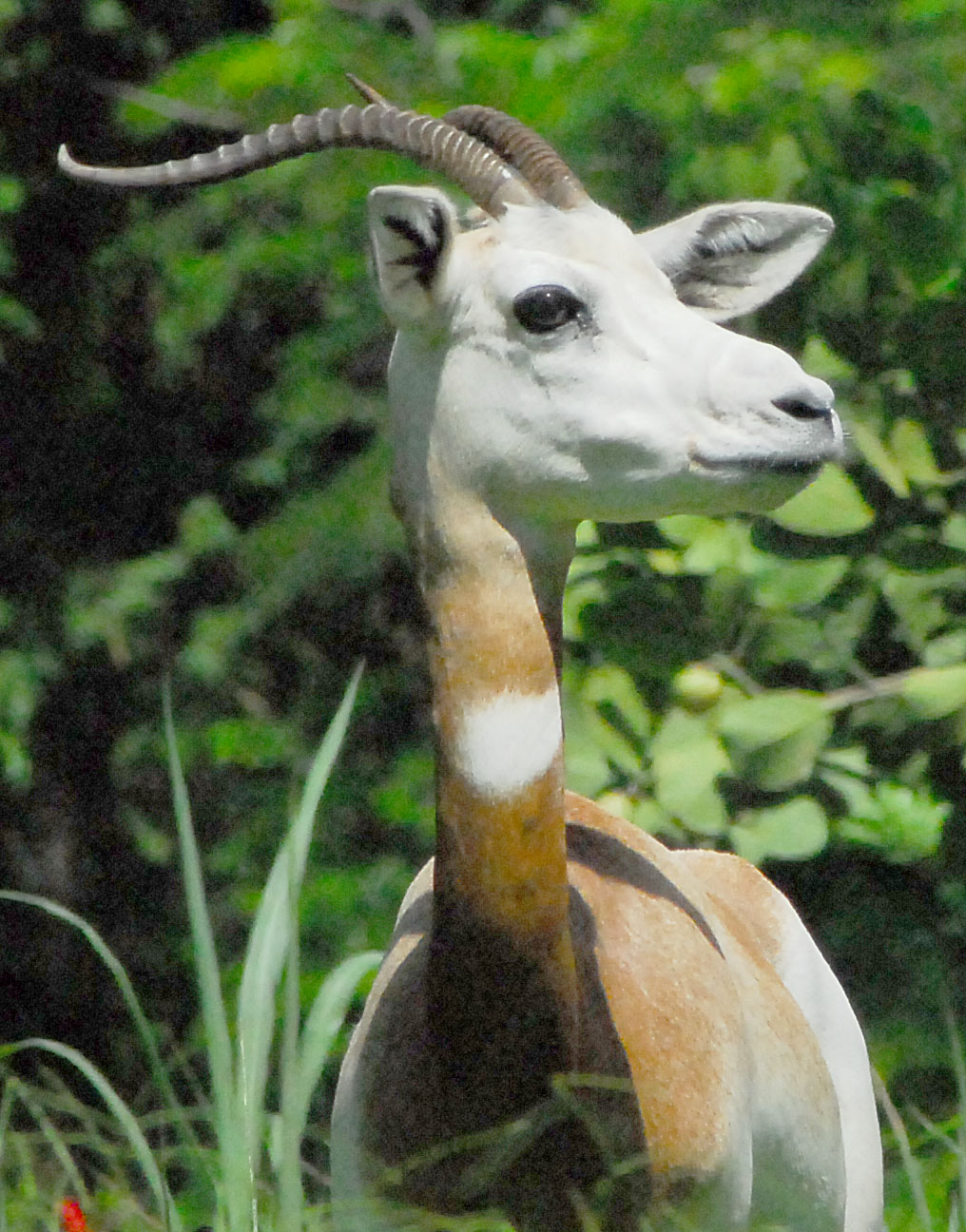
Honolulu Zoo, Hawaii
