= Guembeul Natural Reserve =

Natural reserve in Gandiol, Senegal

Réserve spéciale de faune de Guembeul
- IUCN category IV (habitat/species management area)
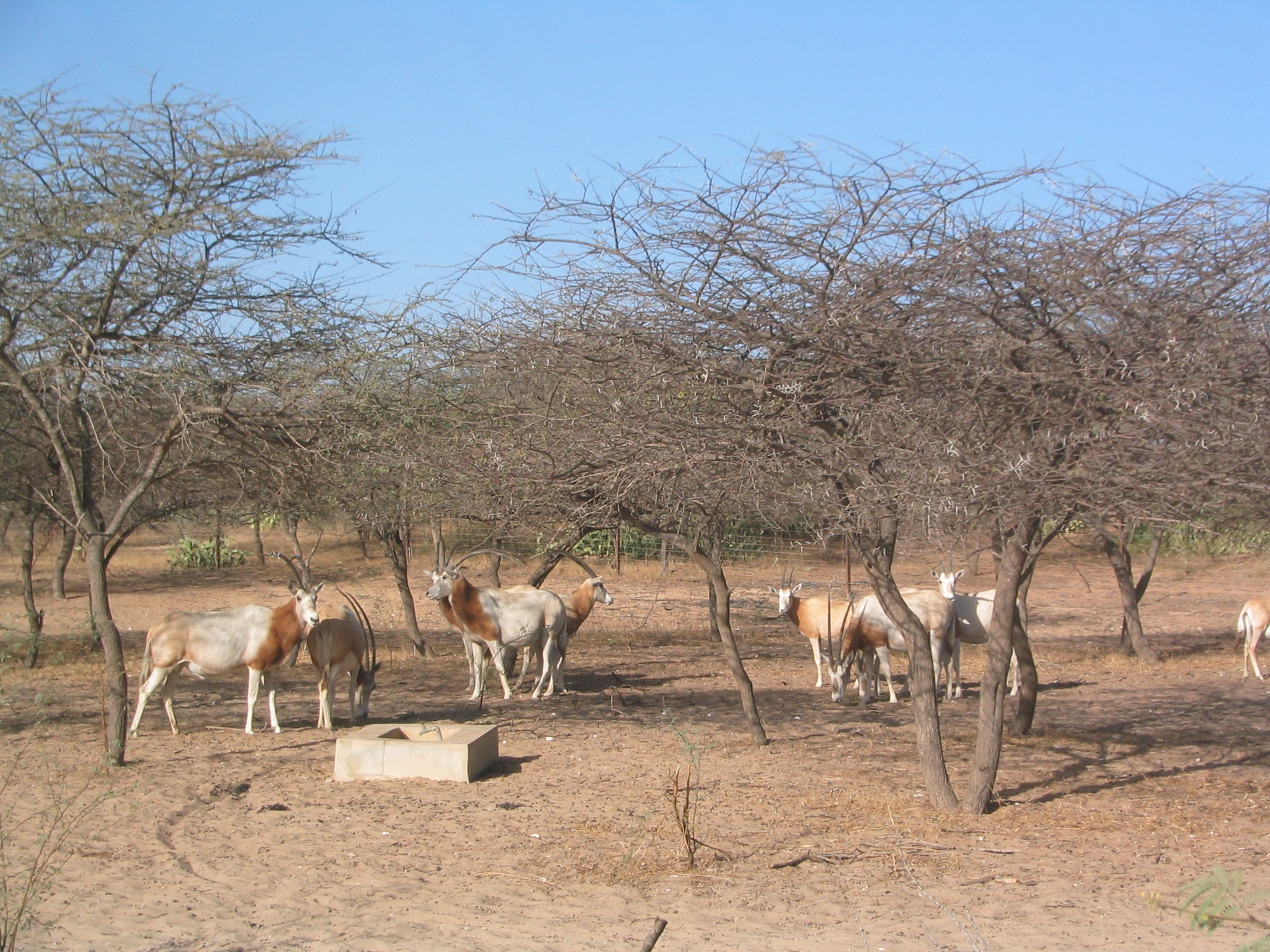
- Scimitar Oryxs at the Guembeul Reserve
- Interactive map of Réserve spéciale de faune de Guembeul
- Location: Gandiol Region, Senegal
- Nearest city: Saint-Louis, Senegal
- Coordinates: 15°55′00″N 16°28′00″W
- Area: 720 ha (1,800 acres)
- Established: 1 January 1983
- Governing body: Ministre de l'Environnement et de la Protection de la Nature - Senegal

Ramsar Wetland
- Official name: Réserve Spéciale de Faune de Gueumbeul
- Designated: 29 September 1986
- Reference no.: 338

Guembeul Natural Reserve (fr. Réserve spéciale de faune de Guembeul) is a natural reserve located about 10 km south of Saint-Louis, Senegal, in the Gandiol region. It covers an area of 720 hectares, and was designated an IUCN category IV Faunal Reserve in 1983.

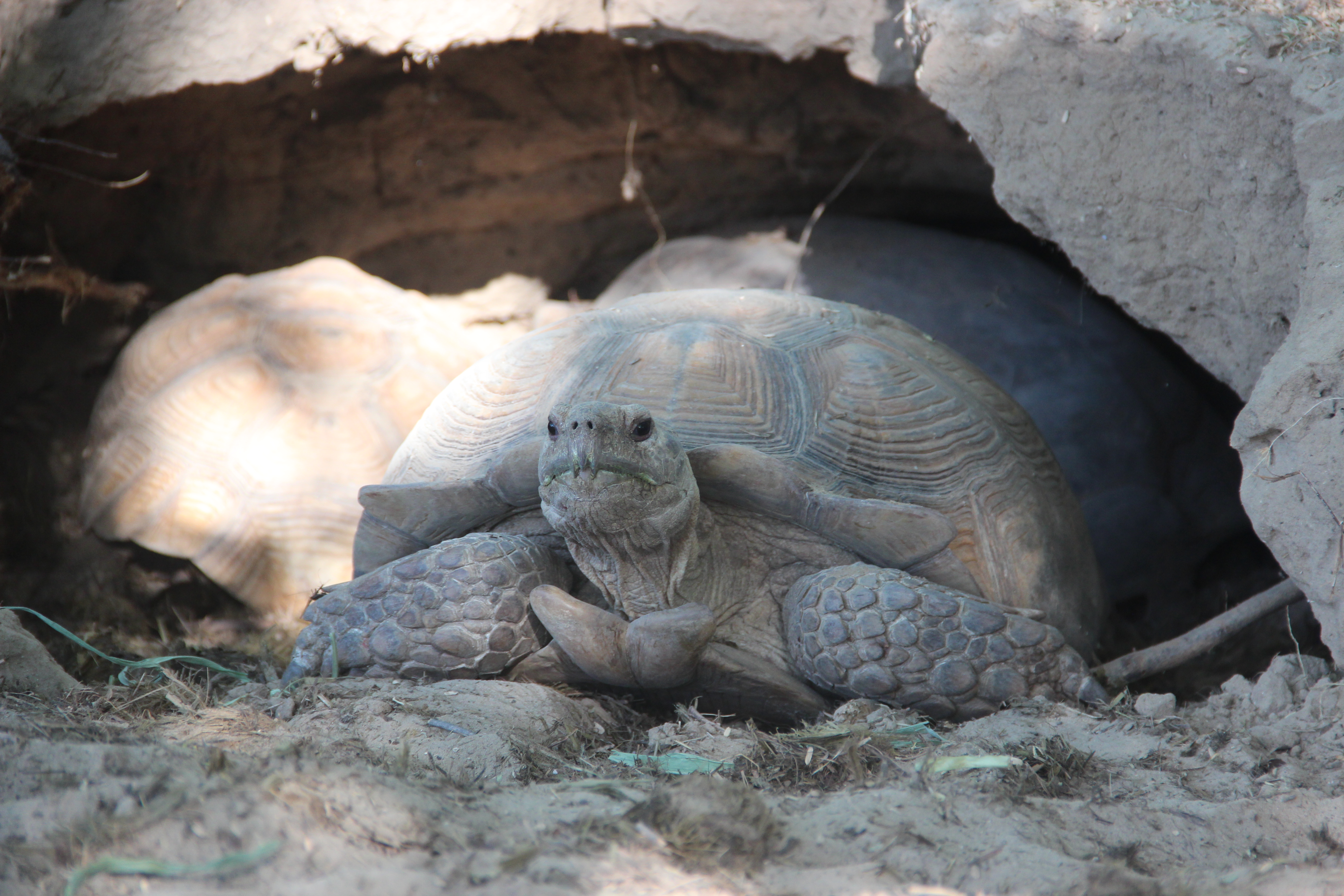
African spurred tortoise

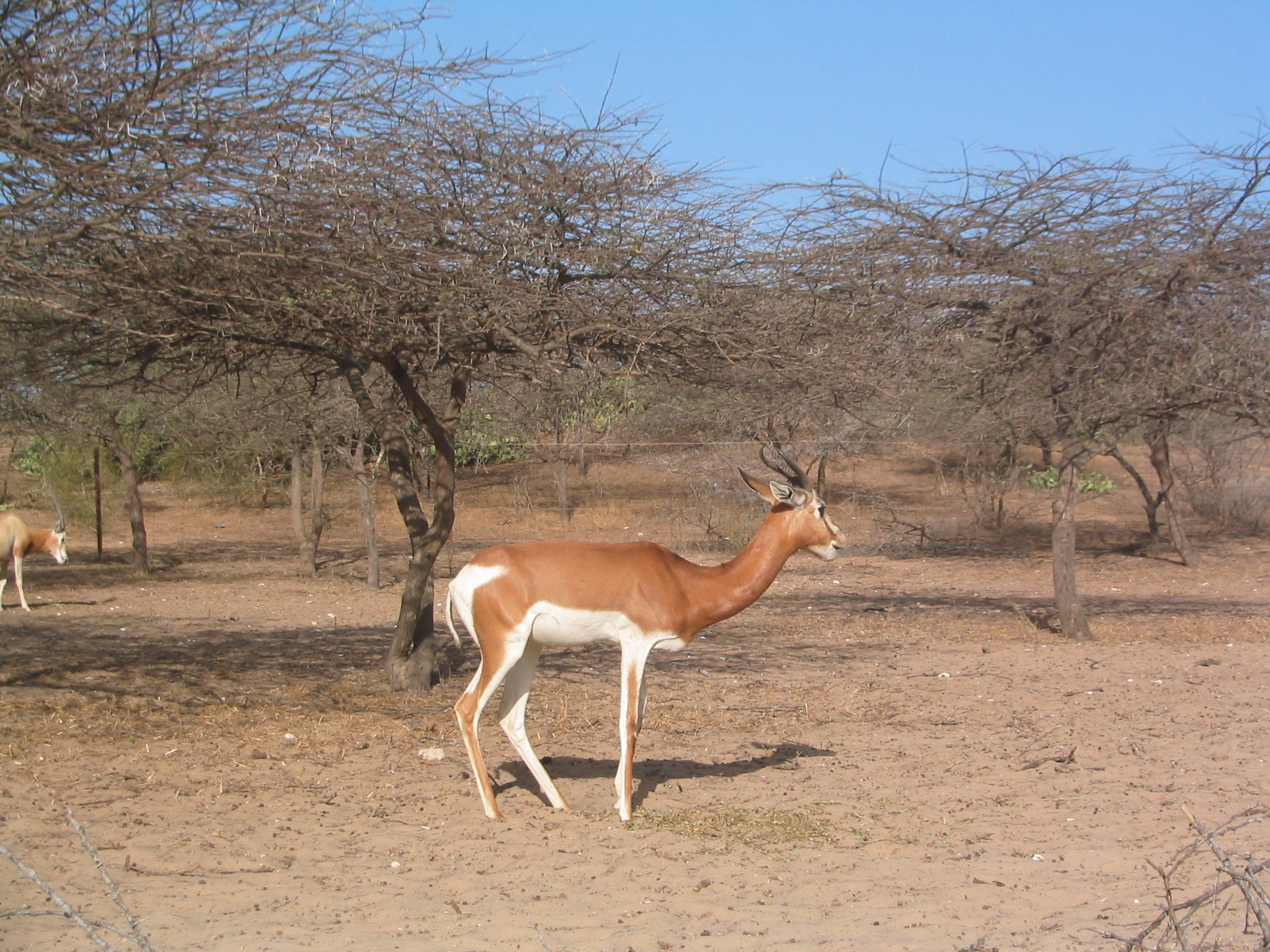
Mhorr gazelle(Subspecies of Dama gazelle)

The park is home to many species of birds, reptiles and mammals. The site is also the center for reintroduction programs of three species of gazelles and is home to the African spurred tortoise.
