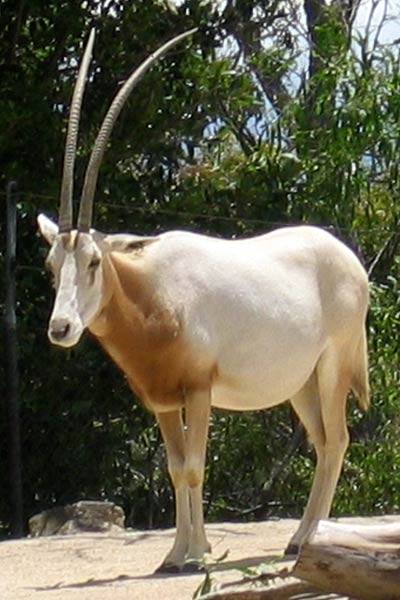
- Adult at the Taronga Zoo

Conservation status
- Endangered (IUCN 3.1)
- CITES Appendix I

Scientific classification
- Kingdom: Animalia
- Phylum: Chordata
- Class: Mammalia
- Order: Artiodactyla
- Family: Bovidae
- Subfamily: Hippotraginae
- Genus: Oryx
- Species: O. dammah

Binomial name
- Oryx dammah (Cretzschmar, 1827)

Synonyms
- Oryx algazel

= Scimitar oryx =

Species of oryx

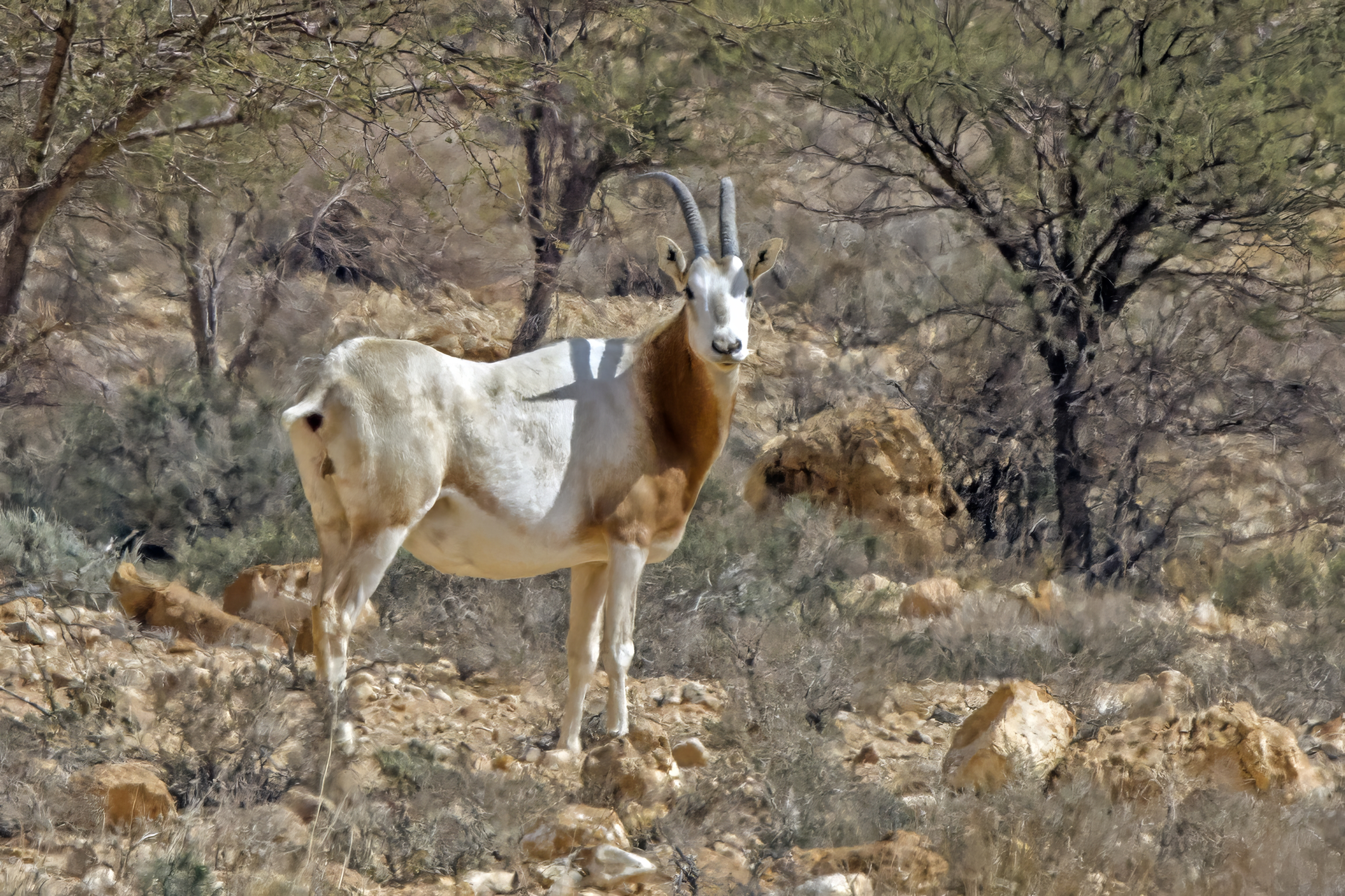
in Bou-Hedma National Park, Tunisia

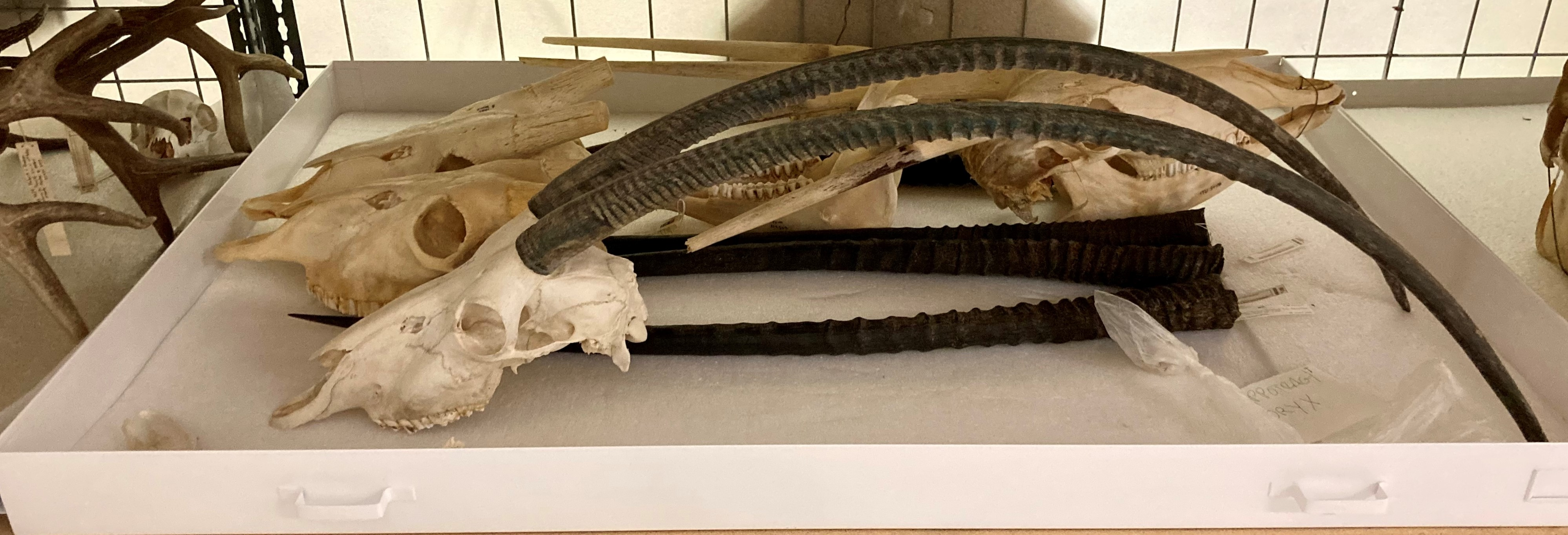
Osteological specimen of a scimitar oryx in the Natural Science Research Laboratory's (NSRL) collection at the Museum of Texas Tech University.

The scimitar oryx (Oryx dammah), also known as the scimitar-horned oryx and the Sahara oryx, is an Oryx species that was once widespread across North Africa and parts of West and Central Africa. In 2000, it was declared extinct in the wild on the IUCN Red List, but in 2023, it was downlisted to endangered, with a reintroduced population in Chad. This particular oryx is adapted to harsh desert conditions and can survive for months without drinking water. A grazing animal, it derives most of its daily moisture intake from plants.

The decline of the scimitar oryx population began as a result of climate change during the Neolithic period, and later it was hunted extensively for its horns. Today, it is bred in captivity in special reserves in Tunisia, Morocco, and Senegal, and on private exotic animal ranches in the Texas Hill Country, United States. In 2016, a reintroduction program was launched, and currently a small herd has been successfully reintroduced in Chad.

The scimitar oryx was the emblem of the ancient Egyptian Oryx nome and today is the animal symbol of the Sahara Conservation Fund.

== Taxonomy and naming ==
The scimitar oryx is a member of the genus Oryx and the family Bovidae. German naturalist Lorenz Oken first described it in 1816, naming it Oryx algazel. The nomenclature has undergone various changes since then, with the introduction of names such as Oryx tao, O. leucoryx, O. damma, O. dammah, O. bezoarticus, and O. ensicornis. In 1826, Philipp Jakob Cretzschmar used the name Oryx ammah for the species. A year later, the name Oryx leucoryx came into use, but as this was a synonym of the Arabian oryx (then called Oryx beatrix), it was abandoned, and Oryx algazel was accepted once more. Over 100 years later in 1951, Sir John Ellerman and Terence Morrison-Scott found that the name Oryx algazel was also ineligible for use. Finally, in January 1956, the International Trust for Zoological Nomenclature accepted Oryx dammah as the scientific name. No change has been made since then, though many papers published after 1956 created confusion by using names such as O. gazella tao.

Its scientific name, Oryx dammah, is derived from: Ancient Greek ὄρυξ (orux), meaning a gazelle or antelope (originally a pickaxe); Latin damma (fallow deer or antelope); and Arabic dammar (sheep). The scimitar oryx is named for its horns, which resemble scimitars. Its common name in English is "scimitar-horned oryx", or simply "scimitar oryx".

== Genetics and evolution ==
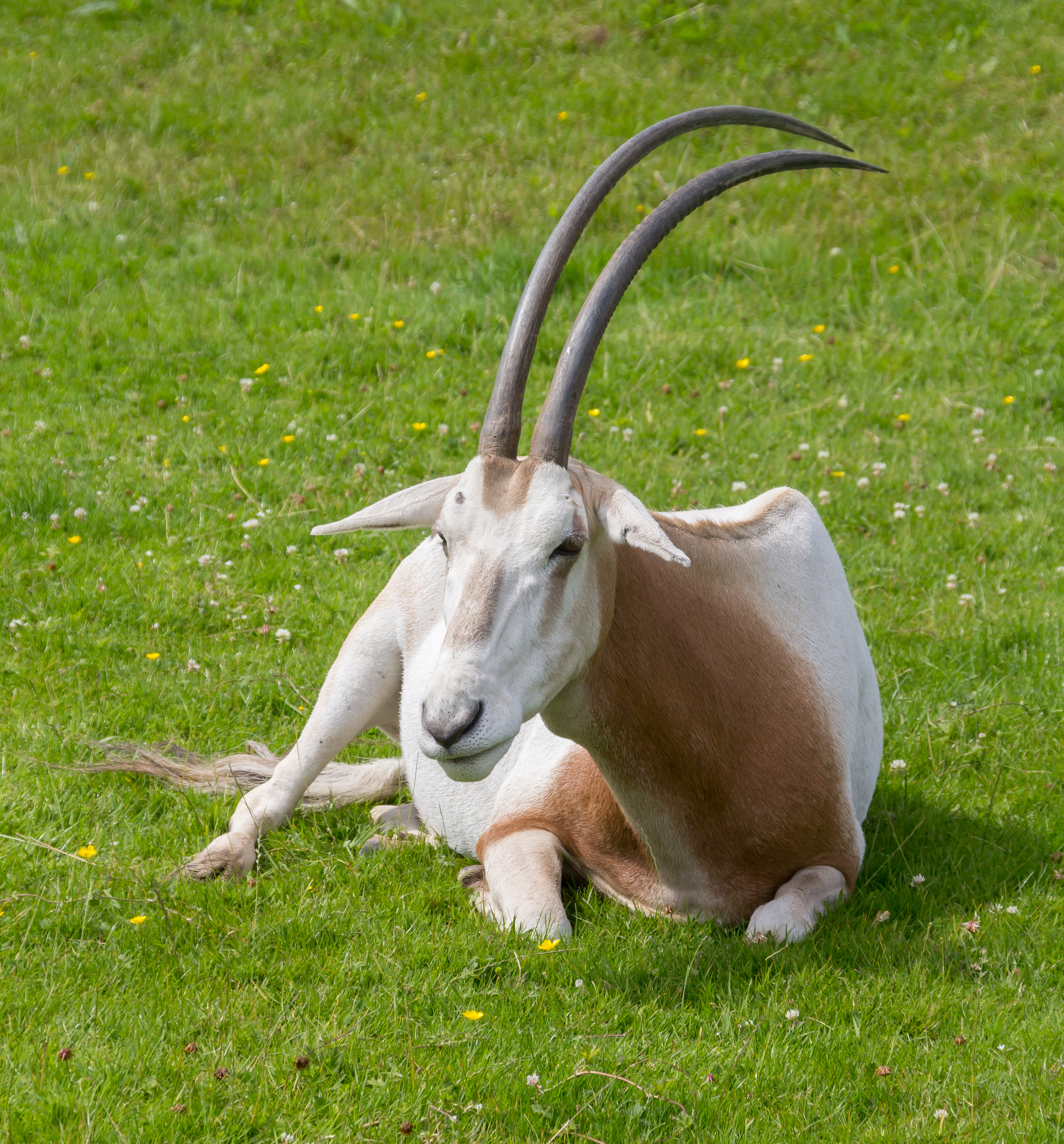
Scimitar oryx at Chester Zoo

The scimitar oryx has 58 chromosomes - one pair of large submetacentric autosomes and 27 acrocentric autosomal pairs. The X and Y chromosomes are the largest and smallest acrocentrics. The first molecular study of this species (published in 2007) observed genetic diversity among European, North American, and some other captive groups. Divergence was found within the mitochondrial DNA haplotypes and was estimated to have taken place between 2.1 and 2.7 million years ago (Mya). Population increases occurred about 1.2 and 0.5 Mya.

In another study, intended to note genetic differences between Oryx species, karyotypes of Oryx species and subspecies – namely O. gazella, O. b. beisa, O. b. callotis, O. dammah, and O. leucoryx – were compared with the standard karyotype of Bos taurus. The number of autosomes in all karyotypes was 58. The X and Y chromosomes were conserved in all five species.

== Description ==
The scimitar oryx is a straight-horned antelope that stands just over 1 m (3 ft 3 in) at the shoulder. The body measures 140–240 cm (55–94 in) from the head to the base of the tail. The tail is 45–60 cm (18–24 in) long and ends with a tuft. Its coat is white with a red-brown chest and black markings on the forehead and down the length of the nose. The white coat helps to reflect the heat of the desert. It reflects the sun's rays, while the black portions and the tip of the tongue provide protection against sunburn.

The scimitar oryx is sexually dimorphic, with males being larger than females. Males weigh 140–210 kg (310–460 lb) and females 91–140 kg (201–309 lb). Calves are born with yellow coats and lack distinguishing marks, which appear later in life. Their pelage changes to adult coloration at the age of 3–12 months. Both male and female oryxes have horns, with the females' being more slender. The horns are long, thin, and symmetrical, and curve backward, a distinctive feature of this species; they can reach 1.0 to 1.2 m (3 ft 3 in to 3 ft 11 in) in both sexes. The hollow walls of the horns are so thin that they can easily break. The female's udder has four teats. The large, spreading hooves are well adapted to allow them to walk on the sand of dry habitats.

== Diseases and parasites ==
The scimitar oryx can be infected with cryptosporidiosis, a parasitic disease caused by protozoan parasites of the genus Cryptosporidium in the phylum Apicomplexa. A study in 2004 revealed that C. parvum or similar organisms infected 155 mammal species, including the scimitar oryx. An analysis in 2005 found Cryptosporidium parasites in stool samples from 100 mammals, including the scimitar oryx. Oocysts of a new parasite, Eimeria oryxae, have been discovered in the feces of a scimitar oryx from Zoo Garden in Riyadh. In France, Streptococcus uberis was isolated for the first time in an oryx. It had caused vegetative endocarditis in the animal, leading to fatal congestive heart failure.

== Ecology and behavior ==
The scimitar oryx was a very sociable animal and traveled in herds of two to 40 individuals, generally, led by a dominant bull. This species once gathered in groups of several thousand for migration. During the wet season, they migrated north into the Sahara. Scimitar oryxes are diurnal. In the cool, early mornings and evenings, they rest under trees and shrubs, or if neither is available, they dig depressions in the soil with their hooves and rest there. Males fight often, but not for long and not violently. Predators, such as lions, leopards, hyenas, cheetahs, golden jackals, vultures, and Cape hunting dogs, mostly kill weak and young oryxes.

=== Adaptations ===
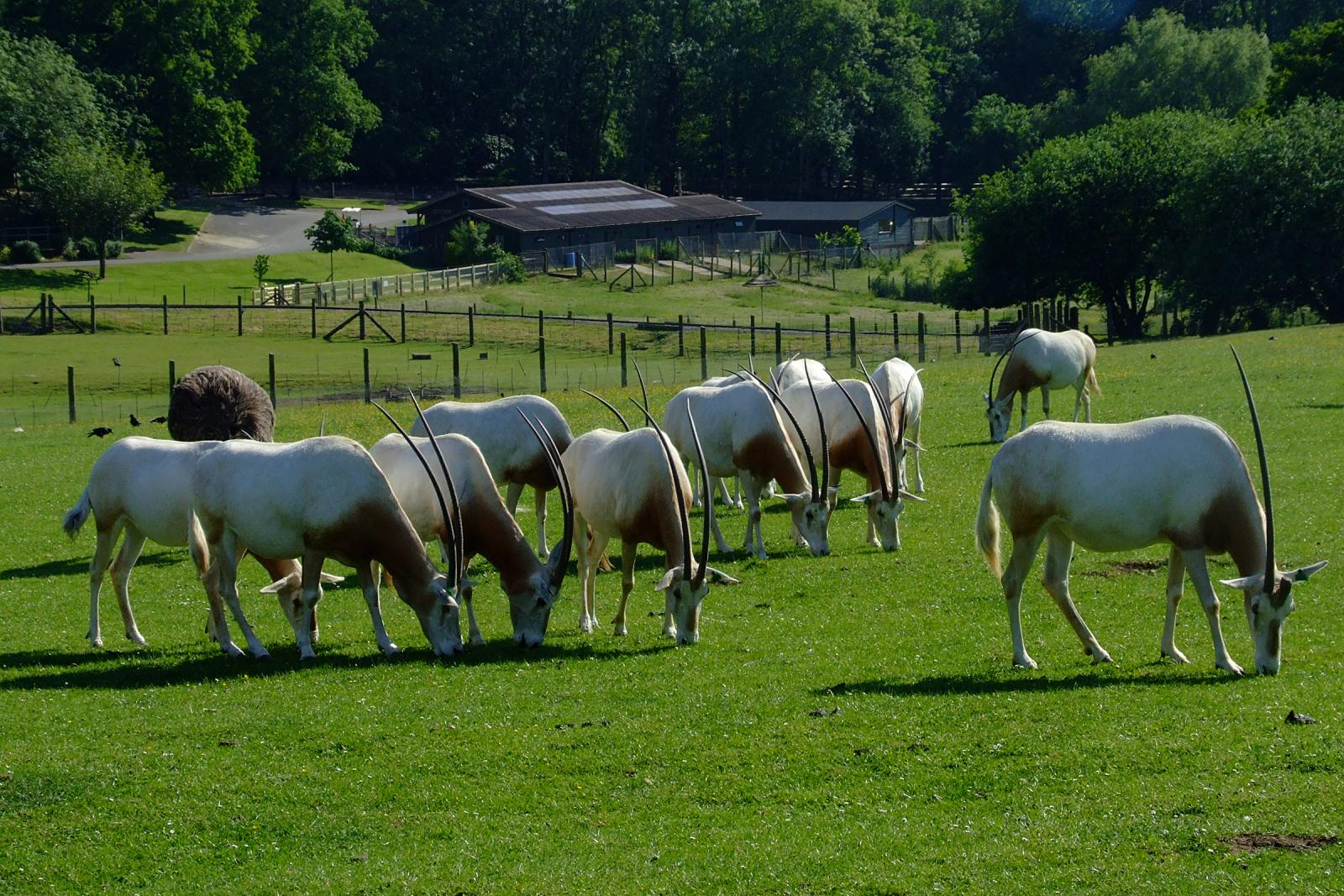
Captive scimitar oryxes grazing in a paddock, Marwell Zoo, Hampshire, UK

With a metabolism that functions at the high temperatures prevalent in their habitats, scimitar oryxes need less water for evaporation to help conduct heat away from the body, enabling them to go for long periods without water. They can allow their body temperatures to rise to almost 46.5 °C (115.7 °F) before beginning to perspire. In times of ample supply, oryxes can use fluid loss through urination and feces to lower their body temperatures to below 36 °C (97 °F) at night, giving more time before reaching maximum body temperature the following day. They can tolerate high temperatures that would be lethal to most mammals. They have a network of fine blood vessels that carries blood from the heart to the brain, passing close to the nasal passage, thus allowing the blood to cool by up to 3 °C (5 °F) before reaching the brain, which is one of the more heat-sensitive organs of the body.

=== Diet ===
The habitat of scimitar oryxes in the wild is steppe and desert, where they eat foliage, grass, herbs, shrubs, succulent plants, legumes, juicy roots, buds, and fruit. They can survive without water for 9-10 months because their kidneys prevent water loss from urination – an adaptation to desert habitats. They can get water from water-rich plants such as the wild melon (Citrullus colocynthis) and Indigofera oblongifolia and from the leafless twigs of Capparis decidua. In the night or early morning, they often search for plants such as Indigofera colutea, which produce a hygroscopic secretion that fulfills water requirements. They eat tuft grasses such as Cymbopogon schoenanthus after rains, but they normally prefer more palatable grasses, such as Cenchrus biflorus, Panicum laetum, and Dactyloctenium aegyptium. When the dry season begins, they feed on the seedpods of Acacia raddiana and during the dry season, they rely on perennial grasses of genera such as Panicum (especially Panicum turgidum) and Aristida and browse plants such as Leptadenia species, Cassia italica, and Cornulaca monacantha.

=== Reproduction ===
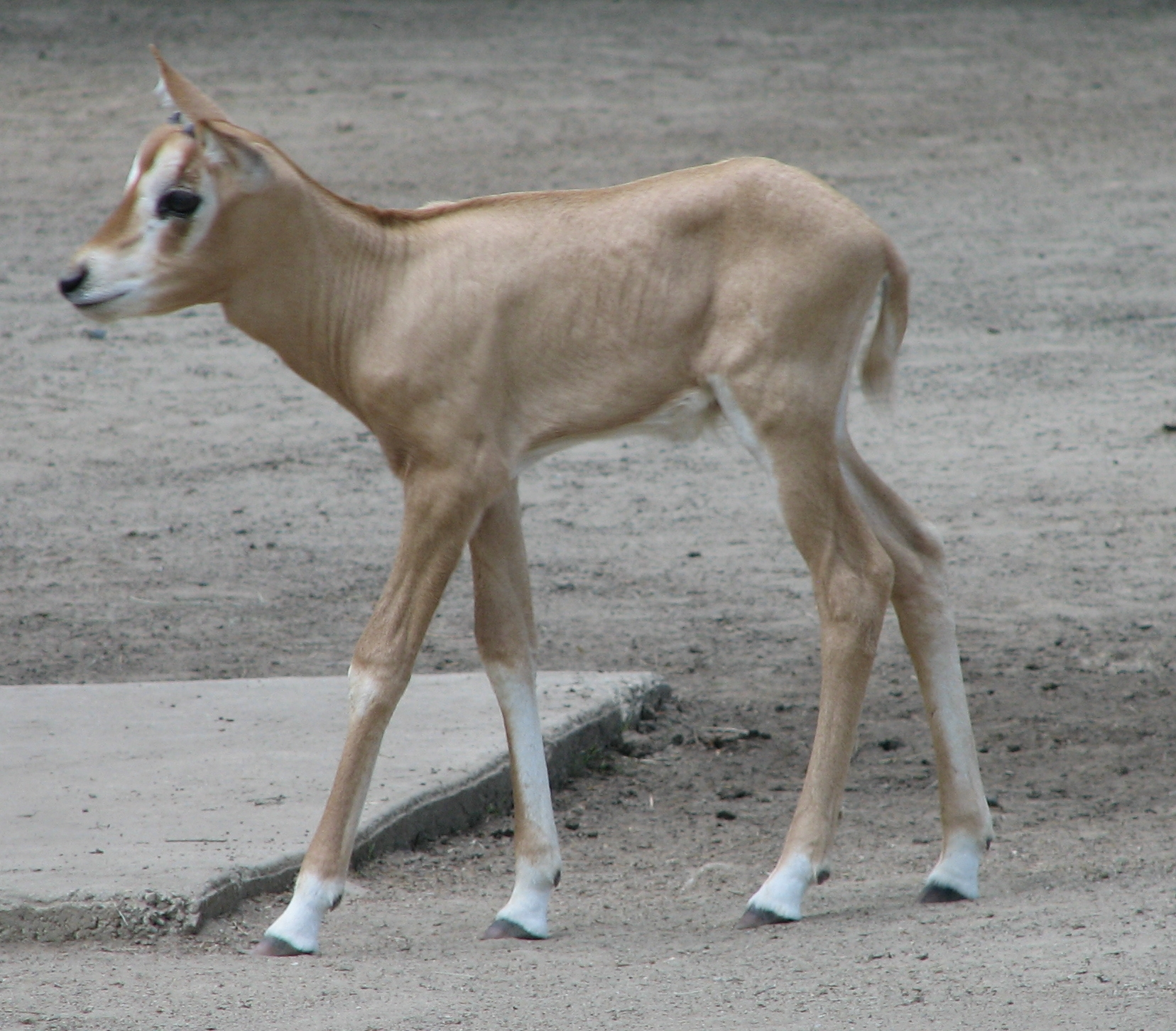
A young scimitar oryx

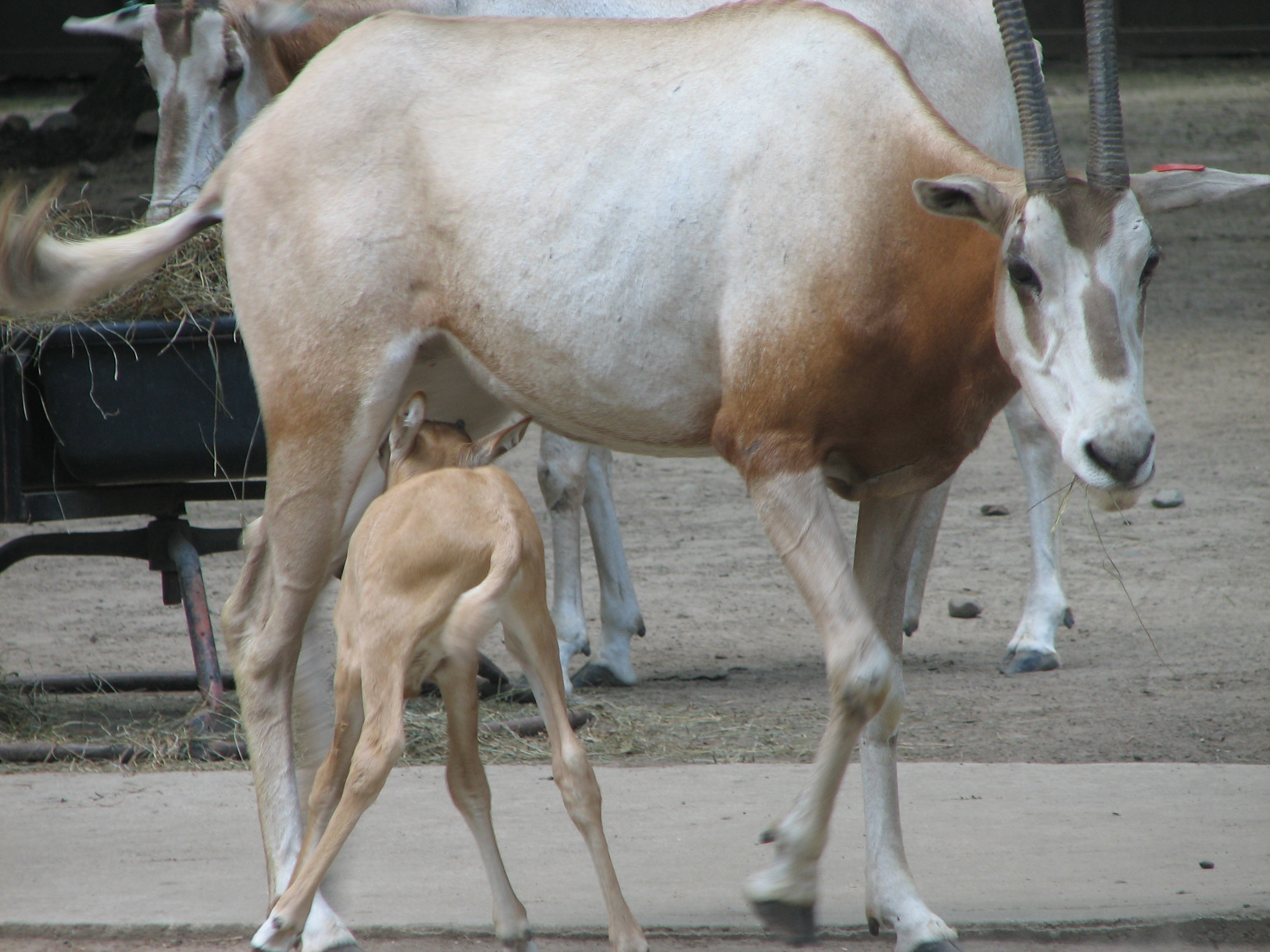
A young scimitar oryx with its mother

Both males and females reach sexual maturity at 18-24 months of age. Births peak between March and October. Mating frequency is greater when environmental conditions are favorable. In zoos, males are most sexually active in autumn. The estrous cycle lasts roughly 24 days, and females experience an anovulatory cycle in spring. Periods between births are less than 332 days, showing that the scimitar oryx is polyestrous.

Courting is done by means of a mating circle; the male and female stand parallel to one another, facing in opposite directions, and then circle around each other until the female allows the male to mount her from behind. If the female is not ready to mate, she runs away and circles in the reverse direction. Copulation is completed in about 10 seconds. Females mate again during their postpartum estrus; thus, they can produce one calf a year. Gestation lasts about nine months, after which a single calf is born, weighing 10–15 kg (22–33 lb). Twin births are very rare, with only 0.7% of the births observed in one study. The mother returns to the herd while the calf hides out at some distance from the herd. The female separates herself from the herd for a few hours while she nurses the calf and cleans the calf as it defecates. Weaning starts at 3.5 months, and the young become fully independent around 14 weeks old.

A scimitar oryx can live as long as 20 years. At Smithsonian National Zoo, a female oryx died at 21, an exceptional age, since females generally have a lifespan around 15 years.

== Habitat and distribution ==
The scimitar oryx once inhabited grassy steppes, semideserts and deserts in a narrow strip of central north Africa (especially in Niger and Chad). It was widespread on the fringes of the Sahara, mainly in subdesert steppe, the grassy zone between the real desert and the Sahel, an area characterized by an annual rainfall of 75–150 mm (3.0–5.9 in). In 1936, a single herd of 10,000 scimitar oryxes was seen in the steppe area of Chad. By the mid-1970s, Chad was home to more than 95% of the world population of this species.

== Status and conservation ==
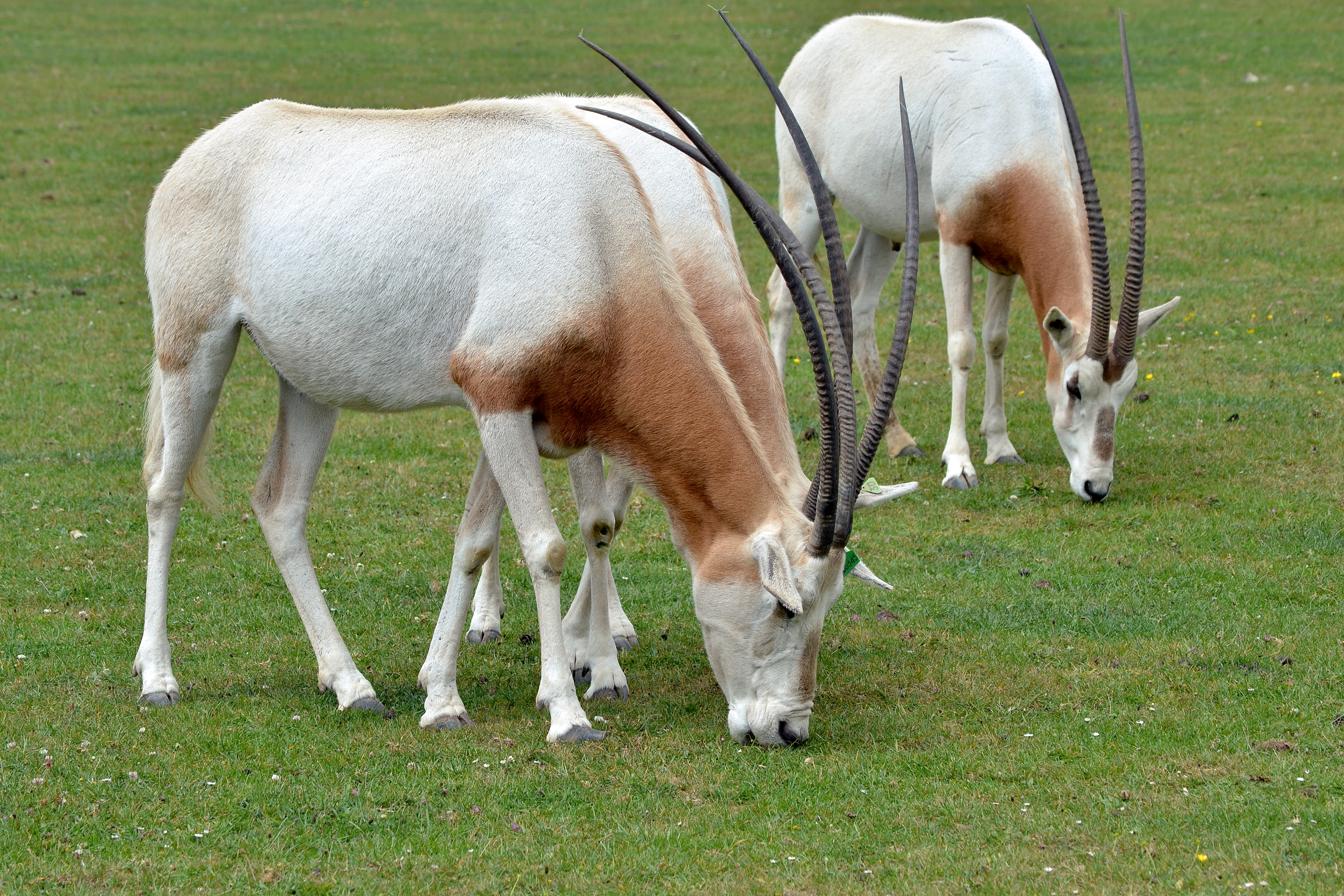
A group of scimitar oryxes at the Marwell Zoo in Hampshire, Great Britain

Following the Neolithic Subpluvial, around 7500 to 3500 BC, the "green Sahara" became dry and the scimitar oryx's population began to decline due to a loss of suitable habitat. This was further exacerbated by humans who hunted the scimitar oryx for both its meat and horns. The northern population was already almost lost before the 20th century. With the introduction of horses and firearms during the 20th century, nomadic hunters were able to decimate populations. The decline of the southern population accelerated as Europeans began to settle the area and hunt them for meat, hides, and horn trophies. French involvement in World War II and the civil war in Chad that started in the 1960s are thought to have caused heavy decreases of the species through an increase in hunting for food. Roadkill, nomadic settlements near watering holes (the oryx's dry-season feeding places), and introduction of cattle and firearms for easy hunting have also reduced numbers.

The IUCN lists the scimitar oryx as extirpated in Algeria, Burkina Faso, Chad, Egypt, Libya, Mali, Mauritania, Morocco, Niger, Nigeria, Senegal, Sudan, Tunisia, and Western Sahara, and has assessed it as extinct in the wild since 2000. Reports of sightings in Chad and Niger remain unsubstantiated, despite extensive surveys carried out throughout Chad and Niger from 2001 to 2004 in an effort to detect antelopes in the Sahel and the Sahara. At least until 1985, 500 scimitar oryxes were estimated to be surviving in Chad and Niger, but by 1988, only a few individuals survived in the wild.

A global captive-breeding program now exists for the scimitar oryx. In 2015, about 1,750 captives were managed as part of breeding programs; at the program's peak, up to 11,000 were kept in Texas farms and 4,000 were held in the Arab states of the Persian Gulf. Reintroduction plans involve fenced-in herds in Bou-Hedma National Park (1985), Sidi Toui National Park (1999) and Oued Dekouk National Park (1999) in Tunisia; Souss-Massa National Park (1995) in Morocco; and Ferlo Faunal Reserve (1998) and Guembeul Wildlife Reserve (1999) in Senegal.

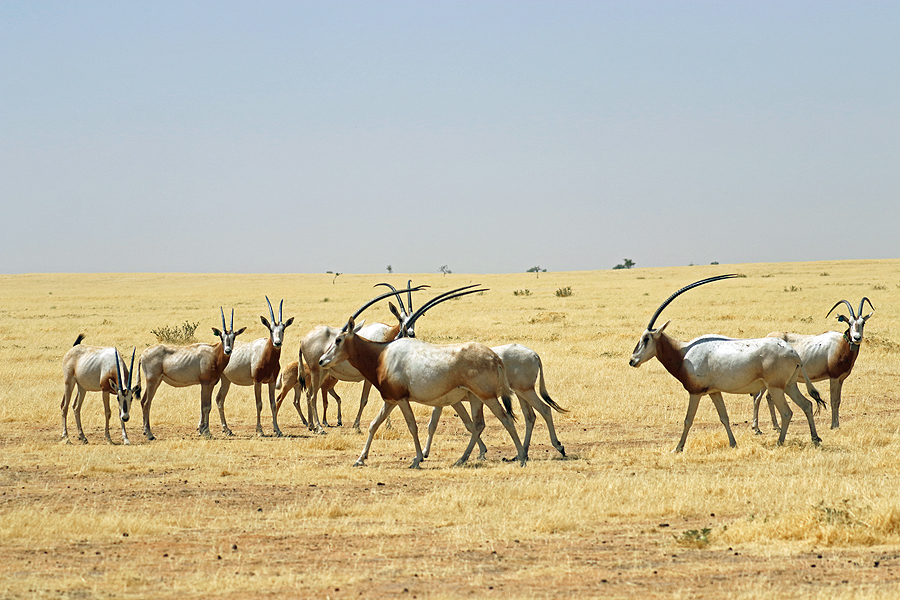
Wild Scimitar-horned Oryx in Ouadi Rimé-Ouadi Achim Faunal Reserve in Chad, in 2022

Chad is currently leading a project to reintroduce the species in Ouadi Rimé-Ouadi Achim Game Reserve, with the support of the Sahara Conservation Fund and the Environment Agency of Abu Dhabi. At 78,000 km^{2} - equivalent to the size of Scotland - Ouadi Rimé Ouadi Achim is one of the world's largest protected areas. The first group was released at the beginning of 2016 in an acclimation enclosure and then fully released in the wild in the rainy season. That group of 21 animals, by the beginning of 2017, had already produced a calf, the first birth in the wild for more than 20 years. A second group comprising six males and eight females was placed in the acclimation enclosure on 21 January 2017. A captive-bred group was released into an acclimation enclosure within the Ouadi Rimé-Ouadi Achim Faunal Reserve in 2016, then reintroduced into the wild. An additional 21 individuals were released into the acclimation enclosure in 2017. The first ones to be relocated were released into the wild in 2016 and have adapted well to their surroundings. In 2017, another herd of 75 scimitar-horned oryxes arrived in an operation led by Chad's Ministry of Environment and Fisheries and the Sahara Conservation Fund. In 2021, 60 new calves were born, bringing the number in the wild to about 400.

The Marwell Zoo in Hampshire and the Edinburgh Zoo have also worked in partnership with ZSL to help reintroduce captive-bred scimitar oryx to their former natural ranges. The Tunisian reintroductions began in 1985 with 10 scimitar oryx from the Marwell and Edinburgh Zoos (co-ordinated by ZSL). In 1999 and 2007, Marwell co-ordinated the release of scimitar oryx into three more protected areas within their former historic range.

== In culture ==
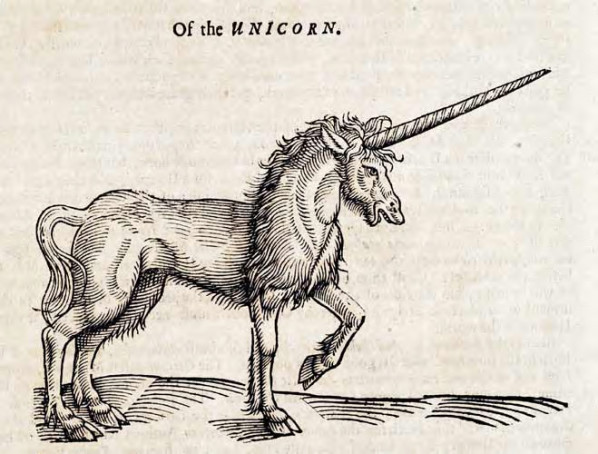
Woodcut illustration of a unicorn, from The History of Four-footed Beasts and Serpents by Edward Topsell

=== Ancient times ===
In ancient Egypt, scimitar oryxes were domesticated or tamed, possibly to be used as offerings for religious ceremonies or as food. They were called ran and bred in captivity. In ancient Rome, they were kept in paddocks and used for coursing, and wealthy Romans ate them. The scimitar oryx was the preferred quarry of Sahelo-Saharan hunters. Its hide is considered high-quality, and the king of Rio de Oro sent 1,000 shields made of it to a contemporary in the Middle Ages. Since then, it has been used to make ropes, harnesses, and saddlery.

=== Unicorn myth ===
The myth of the one-horned unicorn may have originated from sightings of injured scimitar oryxes; Aristotle and Pliny the Elder held that the oryx was the unicorn's "prototype". From certain angles, the oryx may seem to have one horn rather than two, and given that its horns are made from hollow bone that cannot be regrown, if a scimitar oryx were to lose one of its horns, for the rest of its life, it would have only one.

=== Modern times ===
In 2015, Yellow Nose, a scimitar oryx that lives in Portland, Oregon, escaped and startled hikers in Forest Park. The following day, he was caught and returned home.
