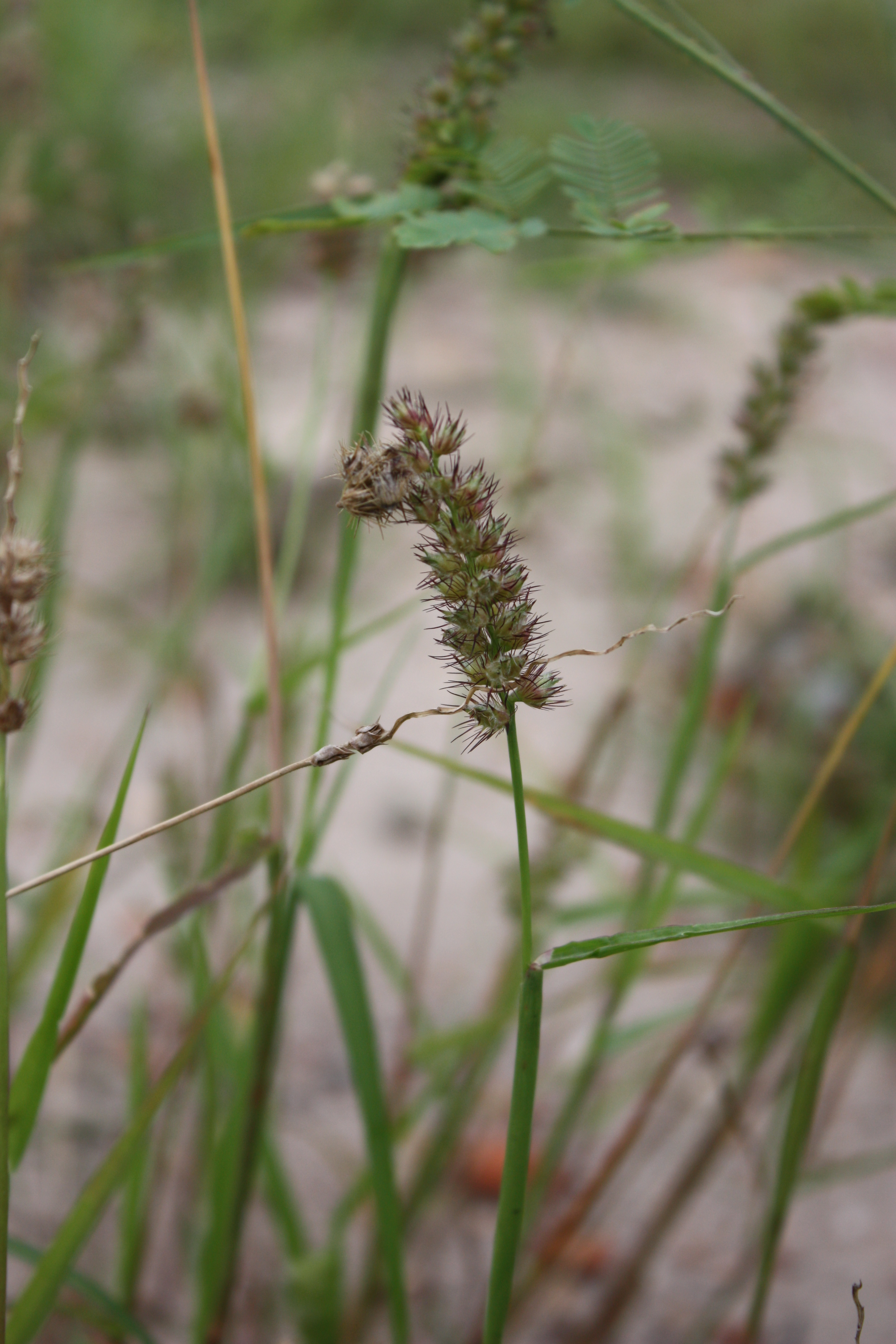

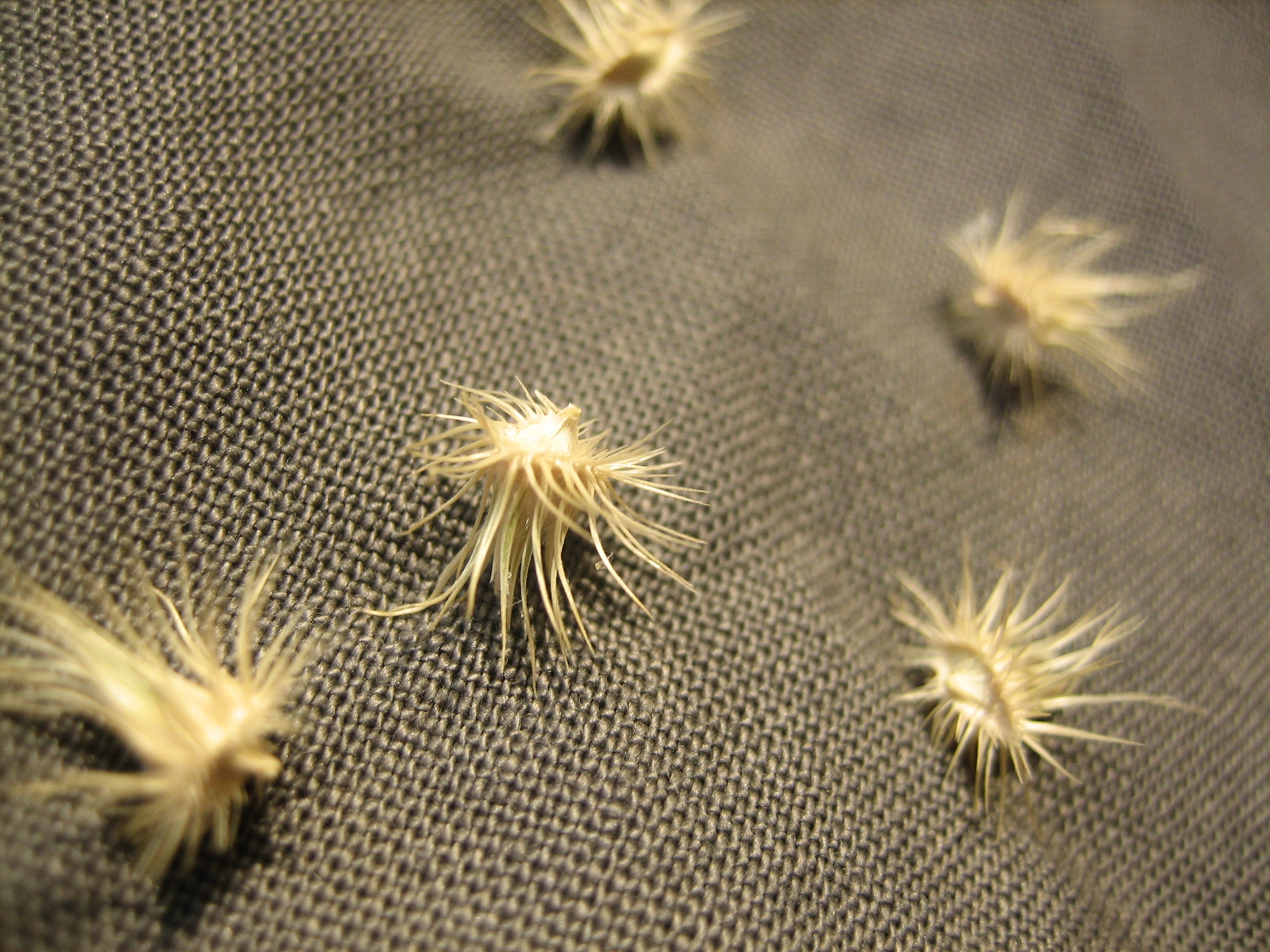

Scientific classification
- Kingdom: Plantae
- Clade: Tracheophytes
- Clade: Angiosperms
- Clade: Monocots
- Clade: Commelinids
- Order: Poales
- Family: Poaceae
- Subfamily: Panicoideae
- Genus: Cenchrus
- Species: C. biflorus

Binomial name
- Cenchrus biflorus Roxb.

Synonyms
- Cenchrus catharticus

= Cenchrus biflorus =

Species of grass

Cenchrus biflorus is a species of annual grass in the family Poaceae. Common names include Indian sandbur, Bhurat or Bhurut in India, Haskaneet in Sudan, Aneeti in the Arabic dialect of Mauritania, Ƙarangiya in the Hausa language of Nigeria, Tòdlɗi in the Karai-karai language and Ngibbi in the Kanuri language of Nigeria. In the francophone countries of the Sahel, it is usually referred to as "cram-cram" .

== Description ==
Cenchrus biflorus is an annual grass of the family Poaceae with culms between 4–90 cm high and spikelets that are 1-3 per bur and 3.6 to 6 mm long. Seeds dispersal is through the attachment of burs to passing cars, animals and human clothes. The burs of the plant can be harmful to animals because it adheres to animal skin and may cause ulcers in mouths of animals.

== Distribution ==
It is common in the Sahel savannas of Africa, south of the Sahara. According to a botanical criteria of geographer Robert Capot-Rey, the northern limit of Cenchrus biflorus defines the southern boundary of the Sahara.

It is also found in India, where the seeds are used in Rajasthan and its Marwar region to make bread, either alone or mixed with bajra (millet).

== Uses ==
A traditional food plant in Africa, this little-known grain has potential to improve nutrition, boost food security, foster rural development and support sustainable landcare. It is thus considered a famine food in several desertic areas. Cenchrus biflorus is also a valuable fodder plant for ruminants, particularly at its early stages of development.
