= Sahara Conservation Fund =

International conservation organization

Sahara Conservation (SC) - previously known as Sahara Conservation Fund - is an international non-governmental organization established in 2004 to conserve the wildlife, including the endangered species, of the Sahara desert and bordering Sahelian grasslands. Its goal is to maintain the Sahara as a well-conserved, well-managed desert in which ecological processes function naturally, with plants and animals in healthy numbers across their normal historical range.

SC creates partnerships between people, governments, worldwide zoos, and scientific communities, international conventions, NGOs, and donor agencies. Its activity is based on three complementary program areas: conserving the Sahara’s remaining wildlife, captive breeding and reintroduction of key species, and communicating the crisis faced by Saharan wildlife. SC currently works in several African countries, including Niger and Chad.

Sahara Conservation was established in 2007 as a 501(c)(3) not for profit organization by the US Internal Revenue Service (tax identification number: 26-0171939) in the State of Missouri (United States). Sahara Conservation - Europe was established in 2016 under the French Law of Associations 1901. These organizations facilitate the essential acquisition and distribution of resources to where they are needed in the field. Sahara Conservation operates across the region but with particular focus on critical conservation landscapes in Chad and Niger where we operate through our locally registered non-profit entities under agreements with these governments
