= Vassako Bolo Strict Nature Reserve =

Nature reserve in the Central African Republic

- Réserve Intégrale de la Vassako-Bolo
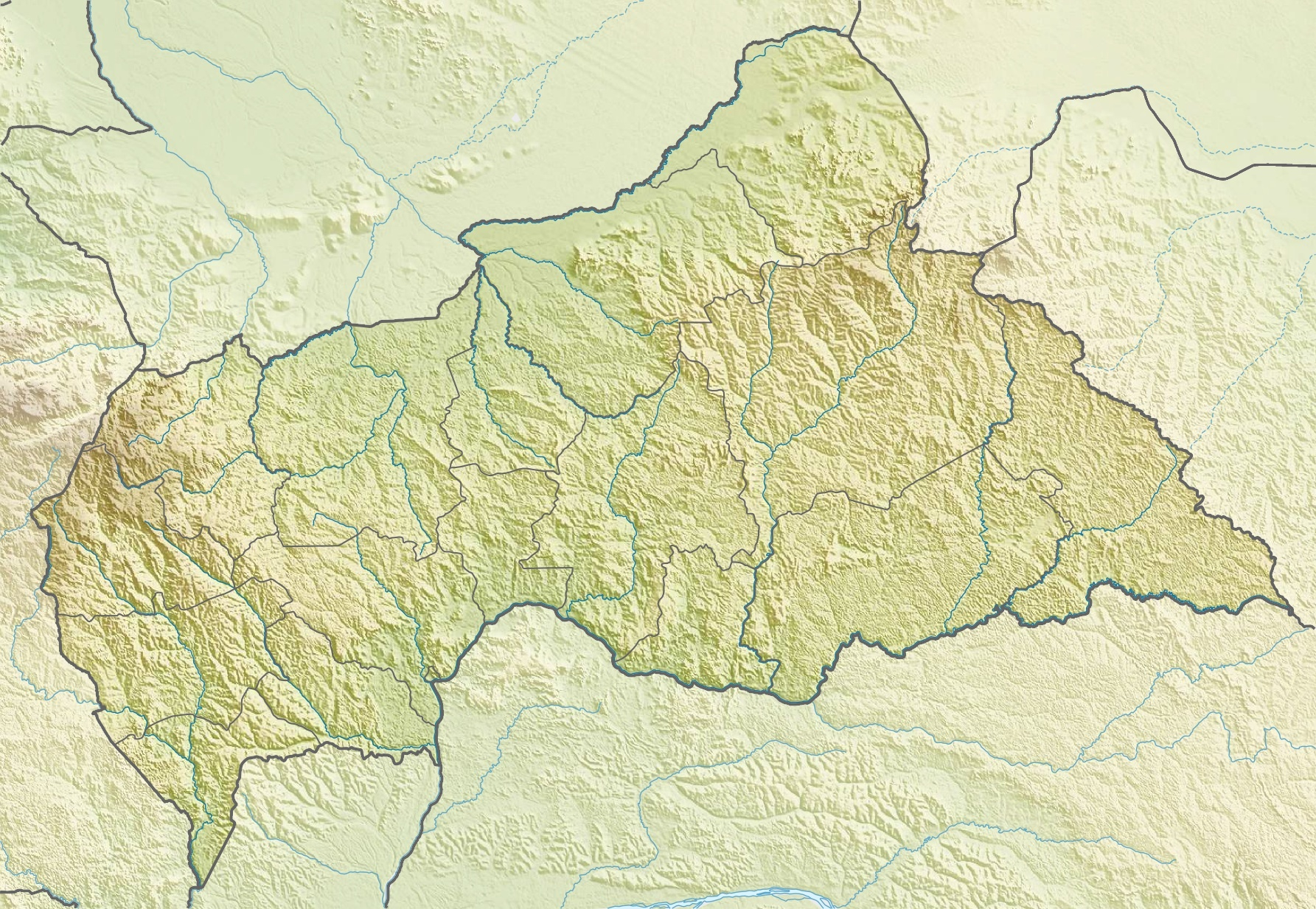
- Location within Central African Republic
- Location: Bamingui-Bangoran, Central African Republic
- Nearest city: N'Délé
- Coordinates: 8.134°N 19.782°E
- Area: 860 km^{2} (330 sq mi)
- Established: 1960

The Vassako Bolo Strict Nature Reserve (Réserve Intégrale de la Vassako-Bolo) is an 860-square-kilometre (330 sq mi) nature reserve within Bamingui-Bangoran National Park and Biosphere Reserve in the northern region of the Central African Republic. It is located near the town of N'Délé, Bamingui-Bangoran prefecture. It was gazetted in 1960.
