= Mbeli Bai =

Freshwater swamp forest in the Republic of the Congo

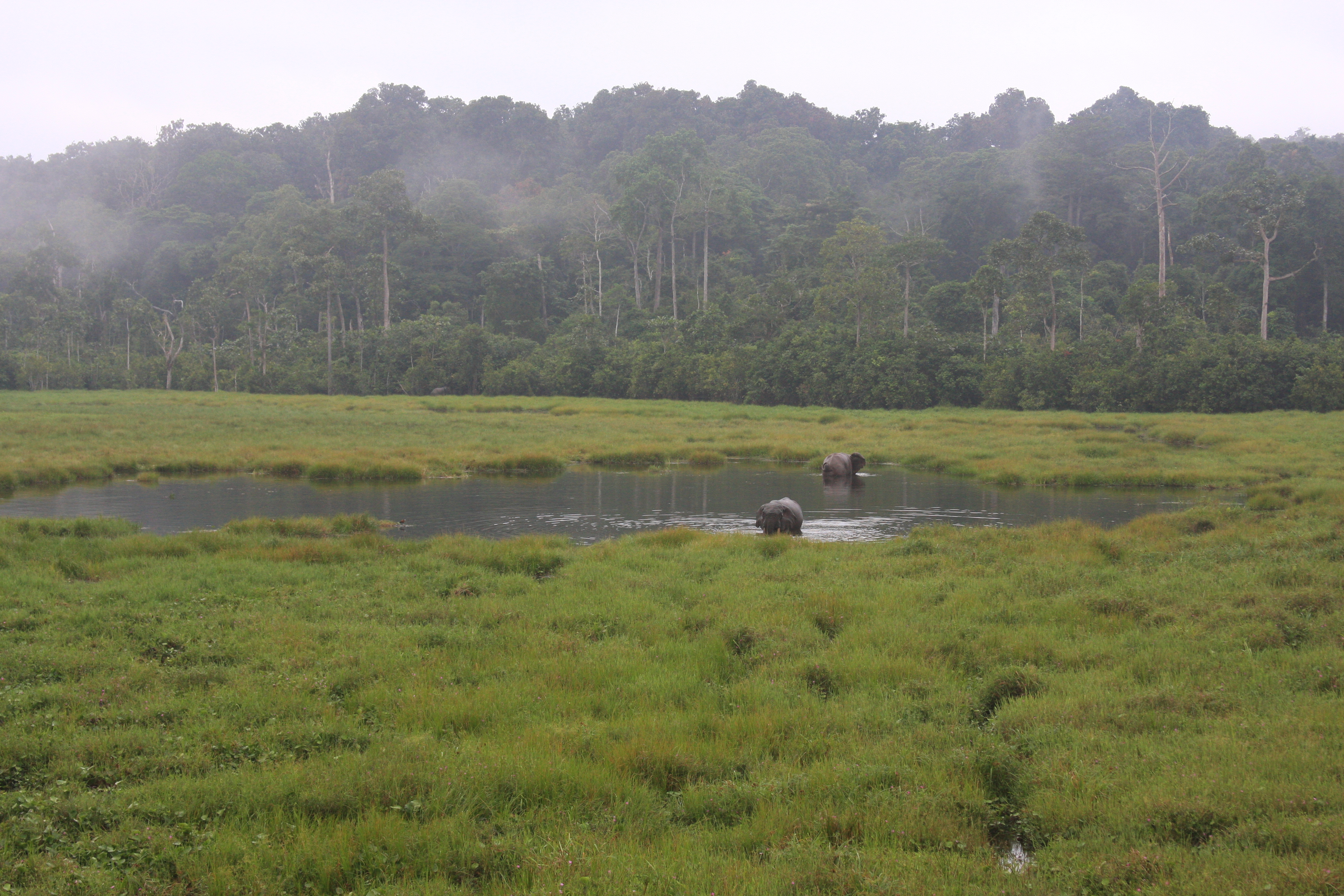
- African forest elephants in Mbeli Bai, 2011

- Location within Republic of the Congo
- Location: Nouabalé-Ndoki National Park
- Nearest city: Ouésso, Republic of the Congo
- Coordinates: 2.2583°N 16.4117°E
- Area: 12.9 ha (32 acres)
- Established: 1993
- Governing body: Wildlife Conservation Society; Ministry of Forest Economy and Environment

Mbeli Bai is a 12.9 hectare protected freshwater swamp forest, part of the Sangha Trinational Forest and the Western Congolian swamp forests ecoregion, in the Nouabalé-Ndoki National Park in the Republic of the Congo. The area is commonly used for research on wild gorillas and elephants.

== History ==
In 1993, the Wildlife Conservation Society, together with the Ministry of Forest Economy and Environment, protected the swamp from human settlement. The area is inhabited by African forest elephants, sitatunga, black-and-white colobus monkeys, Congo clawless and spotted-necked otter, and around 226 western lowland gorillas found in groups of between 2 and 16 individuals.

== Animal research ==
Mbeli Bai is commonly used for animal research. Since February 1995, researchers working for Mbeli Bai's research group, Mbeli Bai Study (MBS), have been monitoring the animals in Mbeli Bai. The Mbeli Bai Study is funded by the Columbus Zoo and Aquarium, the Cologne Zoological Garden, the Dublin Zoo, the Toronto zoo, the Wildlife Conservation Society, and the Woodland Park Zoo, in exchange for receiving animals.

More than 330 gorillas have been monitored spanning more than 1750 gorilla years of around 55 groups of silverback gorillas. The researchers monitored gorilla socialisation, power structures and the first tool use by gorillas.

== Poaching ==
The area had some elephant poaching during the 1990s. During the late 2000s and the 2010s, a poaching group led by Guyvanho killed around 500 elephants in the area. On August 19, 2020, he and his group were arrested, and Guyvanho was sentenced to 30 years in prison.

== Gallery ==
Mbeli Bai

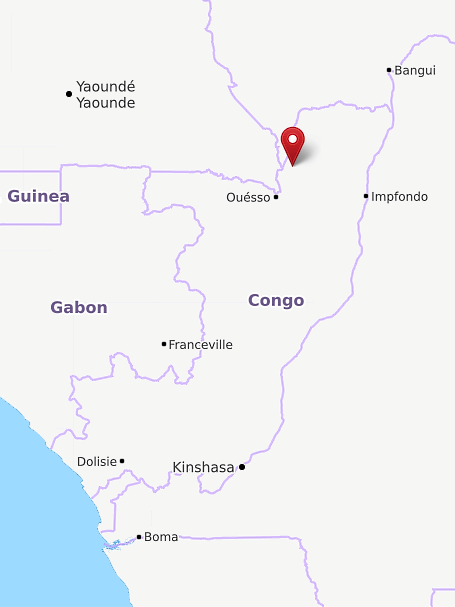
Mbeli Bai on a map

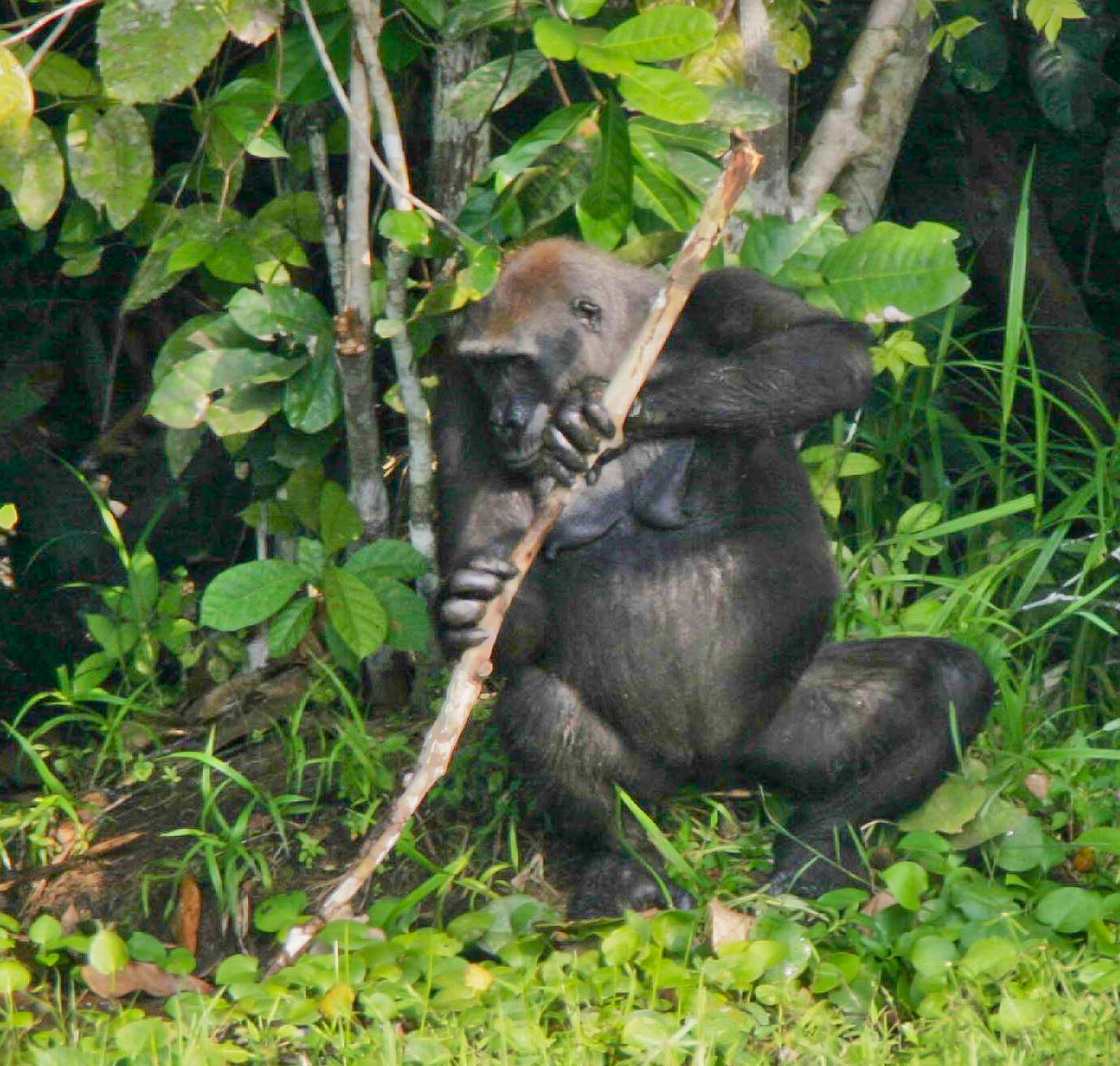
Female western lowland gorilla Efi, the first gorilla spotted using tools, Mbeli Bai, 2005

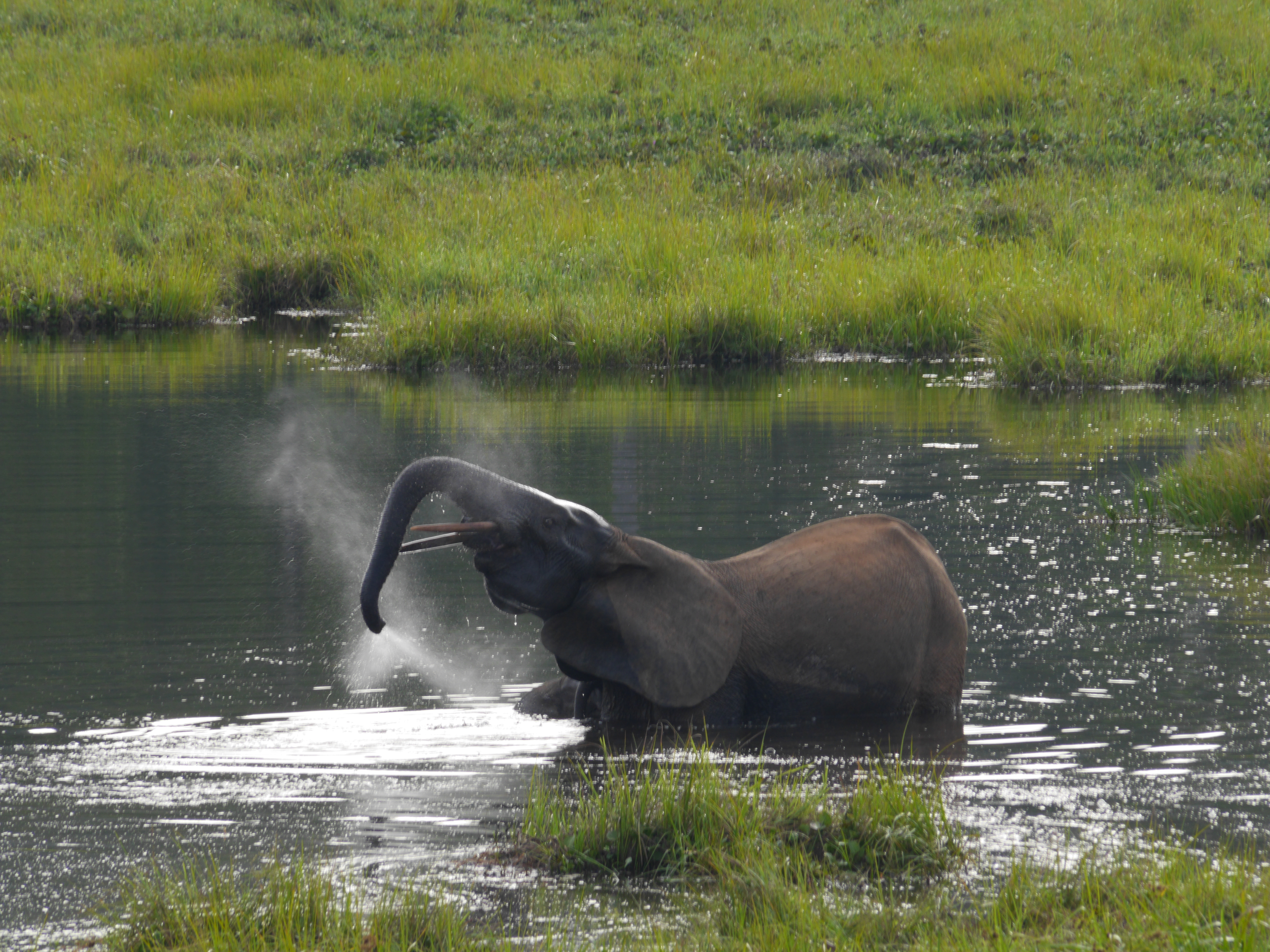
Elephant in marsh, Mbeli Bai, 2015. Photo by the United States Fish and Wildlife Service
