= Nouabalé-Ndoki National Park =

National Park in the Republic of the Congo

Nouabale-Ndoki National Park
- IUCN category II (national park)
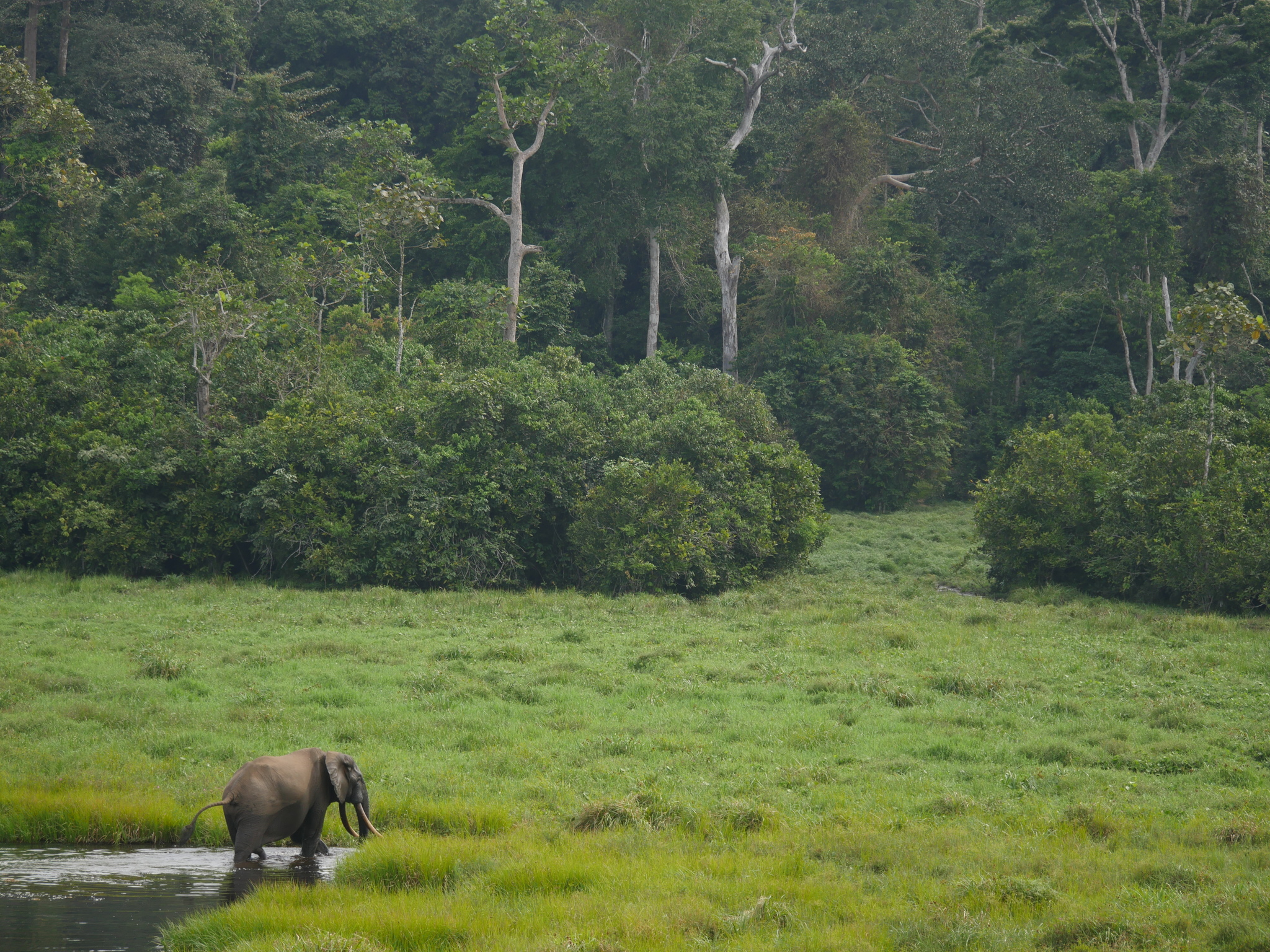
- Park landscape

- Location within Republic of the Congo
- Location: Republic of the Congo
- Coordinates: 2°28′N 16°27′E
- Area: 3,921.61 km^{2} (1,514.14 sq mi)
- Established: 1993
- Governing body: Ministry for National Forestry Commission

Ramsar Wetland
- Official name: Sangha-Nouabalé-Ndoki
- Designated: 4 March 2009
- Reference no.: 1858

Nouabalé-Ndoki National Park is a national park in the Republic of the Congo. Established in 1993, in the northern provinces of Congo, it is home to forest elephants, great apes, including western lowland gorillas and the eastern sub-species of chimpanzees and bongo. The forests have a rich biodiversity of 300 bird species, plus 1,000 plant and tree species which include endangered mahoganies.

== Administration ==
The Nouabalé-Ndoki National Park is managed under a Public-Private Partnership (PPP) agreement, signed in 2013 between the RoC Government and the WCS. The agreement creates the Fondation Nouabalé-Ndoki (FNN), of which WCS has been delegated as the Park Management Unit until 2038.

== History ==
The concept of creating reserved parks emerged in the 1980s with the realization that wild roaming elephants which moved freely in the entire region of the three parks needed to be protected from poachers and the logging industry. Plans to establish the Nouabale-Ndoki National Park were initiated in 1991 by the Wildlife Conservation Society (WCS) and the Government of Congo with support from USAID as a transboundary collaborative project. It also involved a progression of interaction with local, regional and national authorities.

The park was finally established in September 1993 covering an area of 3,921.69 km^{2} (1,514.17 sq mi) between the north-eastern Sangha Department and the north-western Likouala Department of Congo. In 1999, the timber company CIB (Congolaise Industrielle du Bois) and the local community joined hands with WCS and the Government of Congo to create an entity that would minimise the negative impacts of logging on the national park.

In 2001, the park area was extended with part of a neighbouring logging concession known as the Gouloago triangle getting annexed to this park. The German logging firm surrendered its rights over 100 km^{2} (39 sq mi) of the Goualougo Triangle under its lease hold to be merged with the national park, and also resolved to ban hunting. While logging operations (particularly of two species of the African mahogany for high-grade timber) have taken place in many forest regions in the northern Congo to a limited scale, this park has been free of any such operations. This has resulted in the fact that it has been beneficial to effective preservation and growth of population of the wildlife and natural habitat of the forests in the park.

In a conference of the Ministers of Forests of Central African Forest Commission (COMIFAC), it had been resolved to establish within the Congo Basin, the Sangha River Tri-National Protected Area (TNS) with a total area of 11,331 km^{2} (4,375 sq mi) encompassing the Dzanga Sangha Special Reserve and the Dzanga-Ndoki National Park in the Central African Republic, the Nouabalé-Ndoki National Park in the Congo-Brazzaville, and the Lobéké National Park in Cameroon. In 2012, all three national parks were awarded World Heritage Site-status as the Sangha Trinational.

== Geography ==
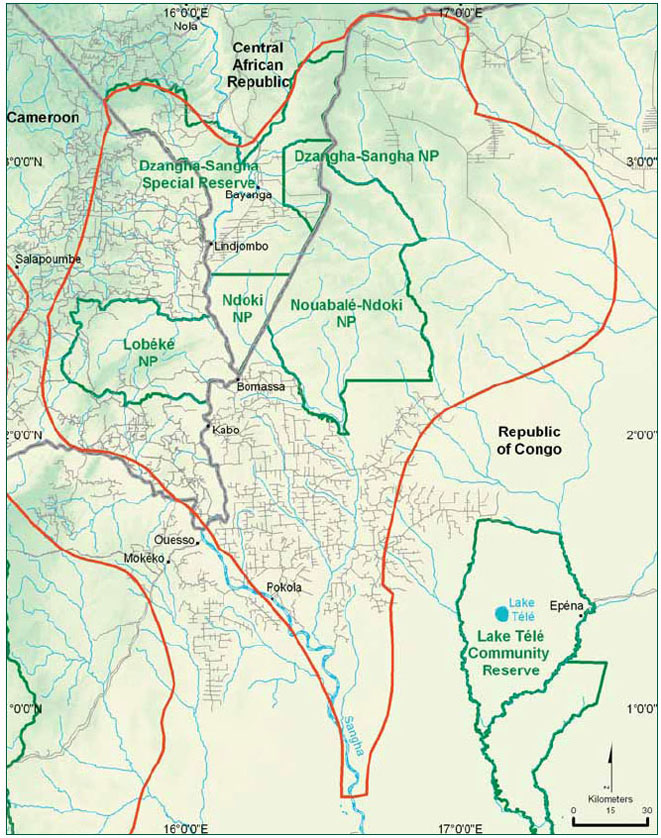
The Sangha Tri National Landscape. The park is labelled.

The protected area, which is part of the Sangha River Tri-National Protected Area (STN) is drained mainly by the Sangha River, a tributary of the Congo River. It is 3,921.61 km^{2} (1,514.14 sq mi) of pristine tropical rainforest with no human habitation within it and with human population densities in its periphery that are comparatively low for the sub-region. Part of the forest is still inaccessible and remains unexplored. It is a swampy tropical forest in lowlands that are part of the Congo River drainage basin. This park, along with the other two reserved parks within the larger Sangha Reserve, is secluded from all economic activity involving roads and human interference, which has resulted in its maintenance as a pristine rainforest.

The park lies within the forest area of Congo which forms 11% of the total area of the country. It has been further demarcated into protected areas, cleared areas known as Bai and Yanga, two seasonal zones for use by nomadic people, hunting areas reserved for employees, protected zones that act as prey zones for hunting, hunting zones for local community, and sacred sites.

=== Climate ===
The park has a humid climate with an average 125 cm (4.10 ft) of rain a year. The wet season is August to November and the dry season December to February.

== Wildlife ==
=== Flora ===
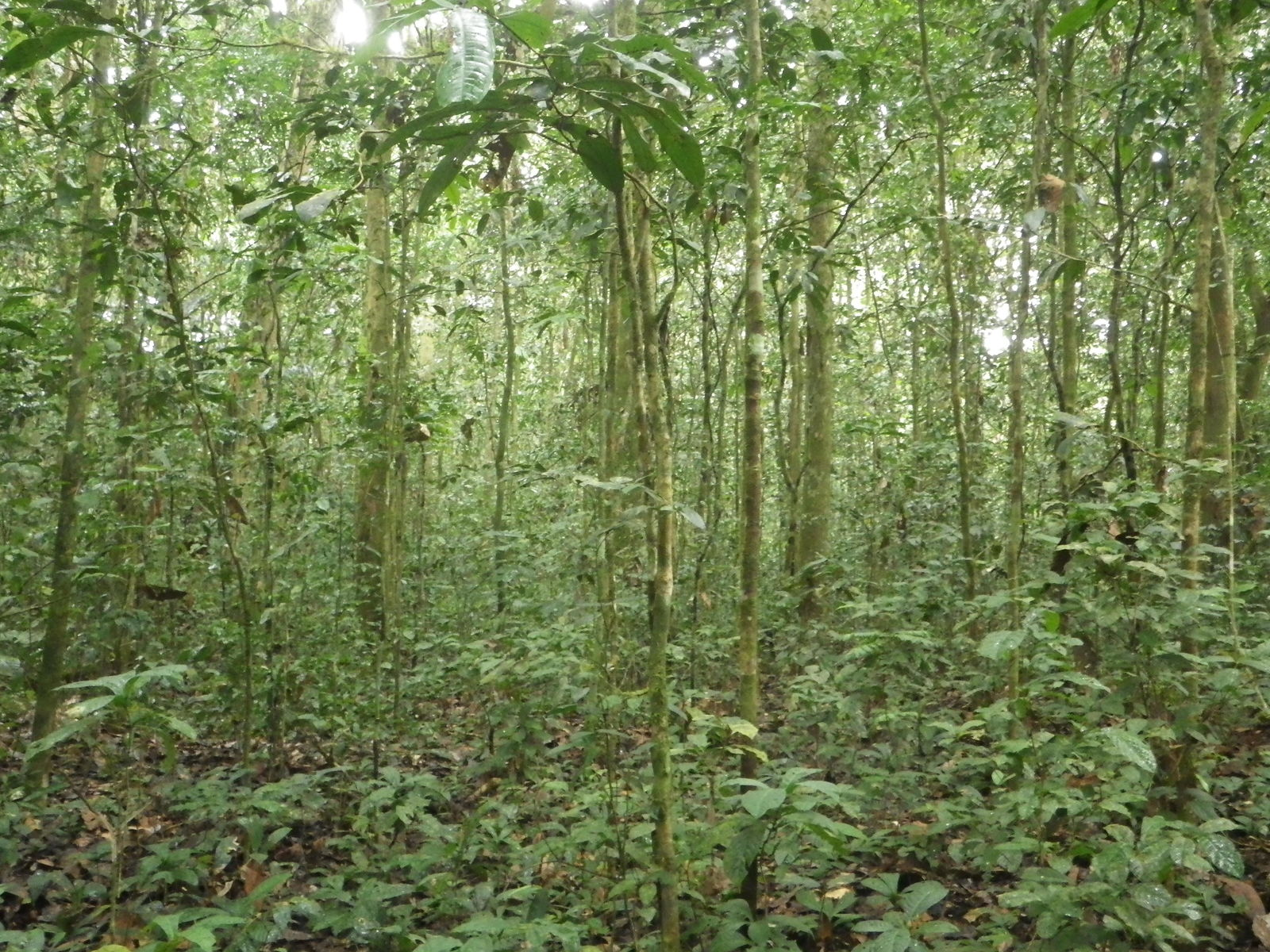
Gilbertiodendron dewevrei forest

Nouable-Ndoki National Park is a lush rainforest with 24 distinct types of vegetation. The plants include a collection of different types of mahoganies. However, the dominant trees are Gilbertiodendron dewevrei in the upland region and away from water courses in large areas. Mixed and swamp forests are also a feature. The forest has many “bais”, or cleared areas. Over 1000 different plant and tree species have been identified. G. dewevevri produces a supra-annual seed crop and it is “thought that mast fruiting may have occurred to combat seed predation through predator satiation”. These seeds are destroyed by beetles. However, they form the major food source for a large number of mammals such as rodents, duikers, red river and giant forest hogs, buffaloes, elephants and, particularly, gorillas.

=== Fauna ===
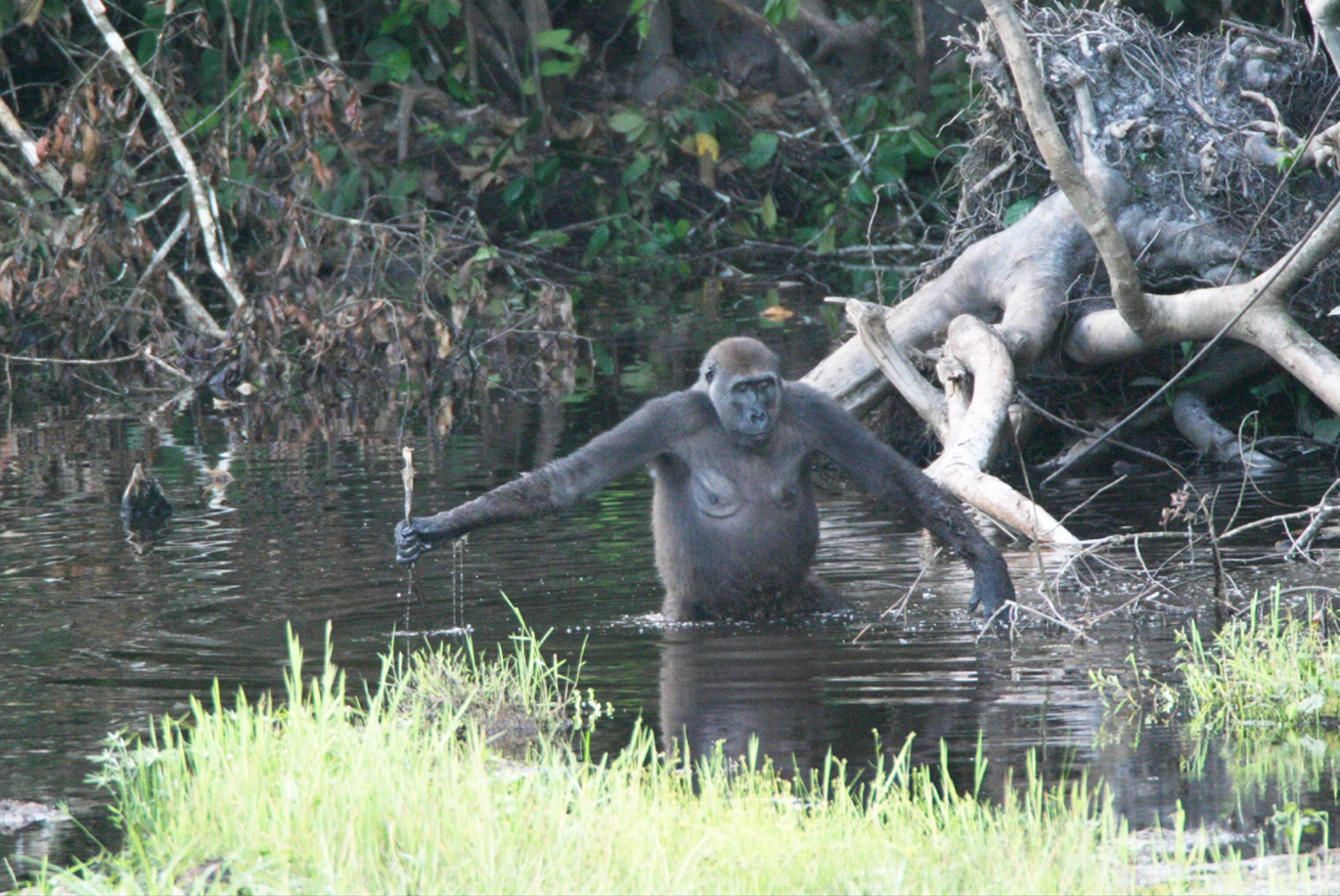
Adult female gorilla in the park

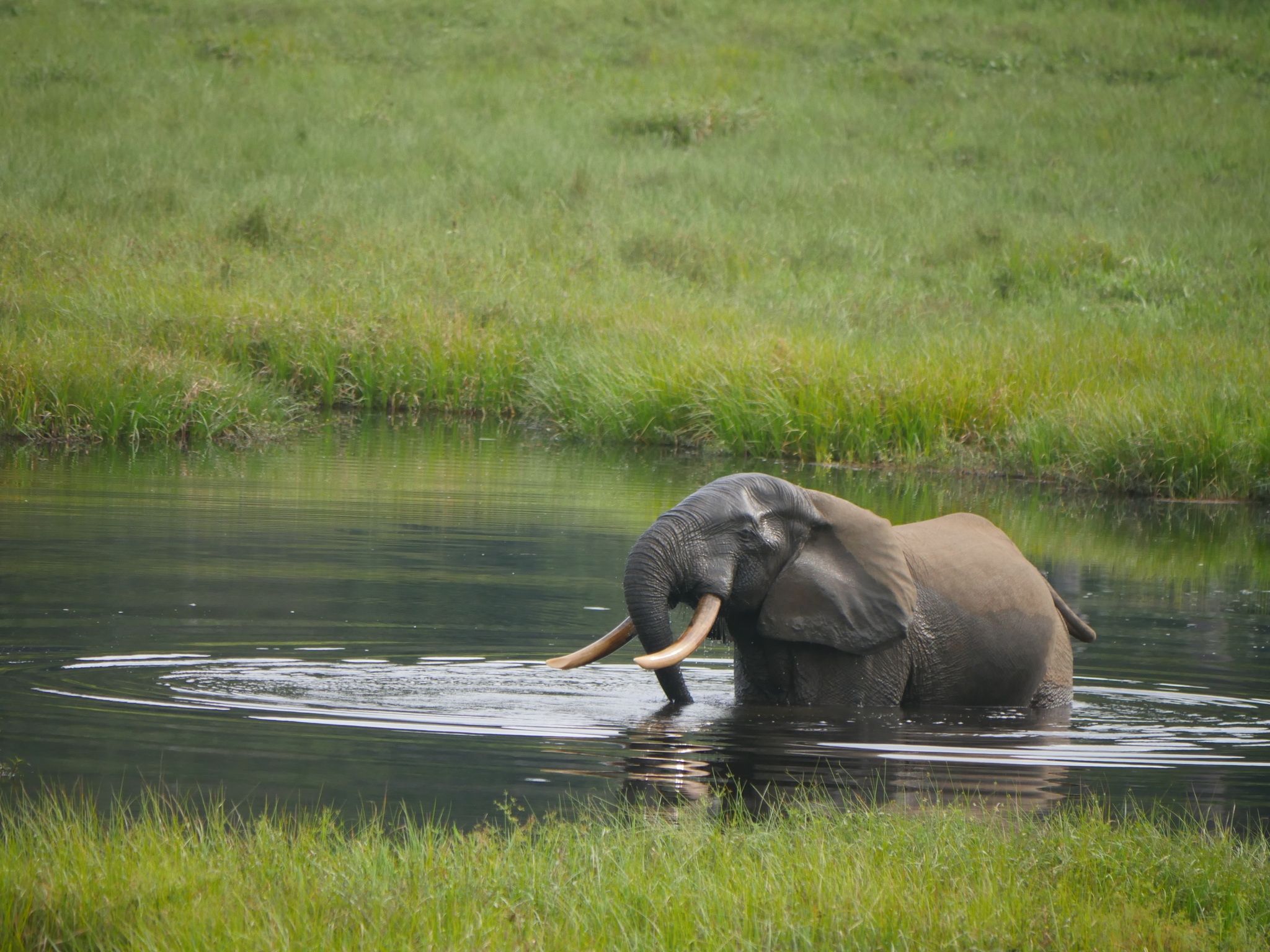
Forest elephant in the park

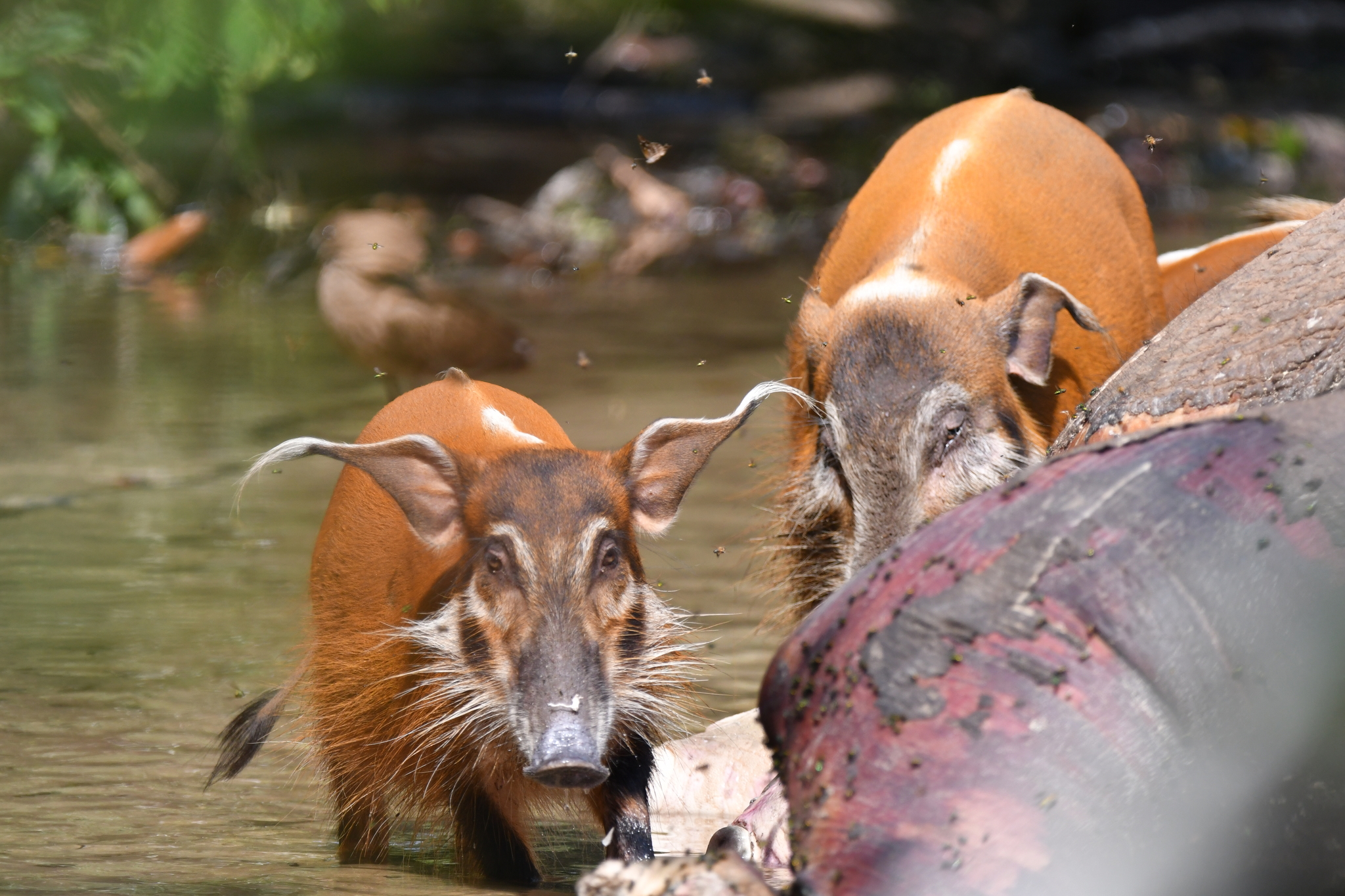
Red river hogs at the carcass of a poached elephant

There are many animal species living in the park. The National Geographic Society has observed that the park may have the largest concentration of wildlife in Africa. The most prominent species are primates, including western lowland gorillas and chimpanzees. Mbeli Bai is a specific 3 km^{2} (1.2 mi^{2}) area within the park which is particularly rich in gorillas, with 180 western lowland gorillas reported here. It also contains many monkey species, nine of which have a population density of 50 per 1 km^{2} (0.39 mi^{2}). Monkeys include black-and-white and red colobus, moustached and crowned guenons, grey-cheeked mangabeys as well as many others.

There are also the rare forest elephant, forest buffalo, leopard, bongo, and blue duiker. Forest elephants create space by clearing the forest for other animals to move. Horned antelopes with 12 lb (5.4 kg) tops number 100 per 1 km^{2} (0.39 mi^{2}). According to an African Pygmy legend, a Congo-based long-necked reptile, known as Mokele-mbembe killed elephants with its huge frontal horn.

The park plays host to over 300 different kinds of birds, including eagles, hawks, owls, vultures, herons and parrots. It has been designated an Important Bird Area (IBA) by BirdLife International because it supports significant populations of many bird species.

Crocodiles and blood-sucking insects are also part of the forest fauna. Herpetofaunal studies have been conducted in four areas, recording 20 amphibian and 14 reptile species in the southern edge of the park; of these, the frogs include Aubria masako, Amietophrynus regularis, Cryptothylax greshoffii, Hyperolius balfouri, H. brachiofasciatus, Leptopelis brevirostris and L. calcaratus meridionalis.

== Conservation ==
Conservation efforts undertaken are not limited to the Nouabale-Ndoki National Park alone but also to the two other parks of the tri region, and also the entire Sangha River Tri-national Protected Area that encompasses more than 96% of the land area. The countries who have formed the tri-national organization under a trans-boundary program through the efforts of the World Wide Fund for Nature (WWF) are the Central African Republic, the Congo and Cameroon. This organizational effort has ensured appropriate actions being implemented related to anti-poaching, research and the promotion of tourism to the rain forests.

A regular feature of this effort is the meetings that are held at regular intervals of the three park-administrations, as well as the prefects of the three countries. Patrolling of the parks is carried out by regular joint patrols to ensure that poaching, smuggling of ivory and unauthorized fishing and carriage fire arms do not happen in the reserve park. Visitors can visit the park only in a group as part of an organized tour arranged by professional wild life tour operators. Numerous providers run safaris into the park in order to fund conservation efforts and raise awareness about the wildlife.

Conservation measures are supported by the German Cooperation of Technical Collaboration (GTC) in Central African Republic and Cameroon, and the World Wildlife Fund for Nature (WWF) and Wildlife Conservation Society (WCS - New York) in the Congo. A trust fund, flush with funds, has also been created for the purpose of conservation of the parks. The national park has also its several research projects that are financially supported by USAID-CARPE, U.S. Fish & Wildlife Service, Columbus Zoo, and the MacArthur Foundation. Consequent to extensive international support, the park is now considered not only nationally important, but also an internationally recognised conservation area of immense importance, with a very well established infrastructure, skilled personnel, and substantial economic backing.

=== Protection ===
In the past, protection technology had been limited for rangers. However, now, they have been using detectors to catch criminals hurting the park. The rangers of Nouabalé-Ndoki National Park have a group known as 'eco-guards'. The 'eco-guards' are under the supervision of the MFEE (Ministry of Forestry Economy and the Environment). With the MFEE/eco-guards, it has been ensured that no illegal human activities take place in the park such as poaching. Apart from the rangers, the local community of the Ba’Aka also provide their local knowledge base inputs to promote sustainable preservation and conservation of the forests in the park.

== See also ==
- African Wildlife
- Guyvanho, poacher who killed over 500 African forest elephants in the park
- Rainforests
