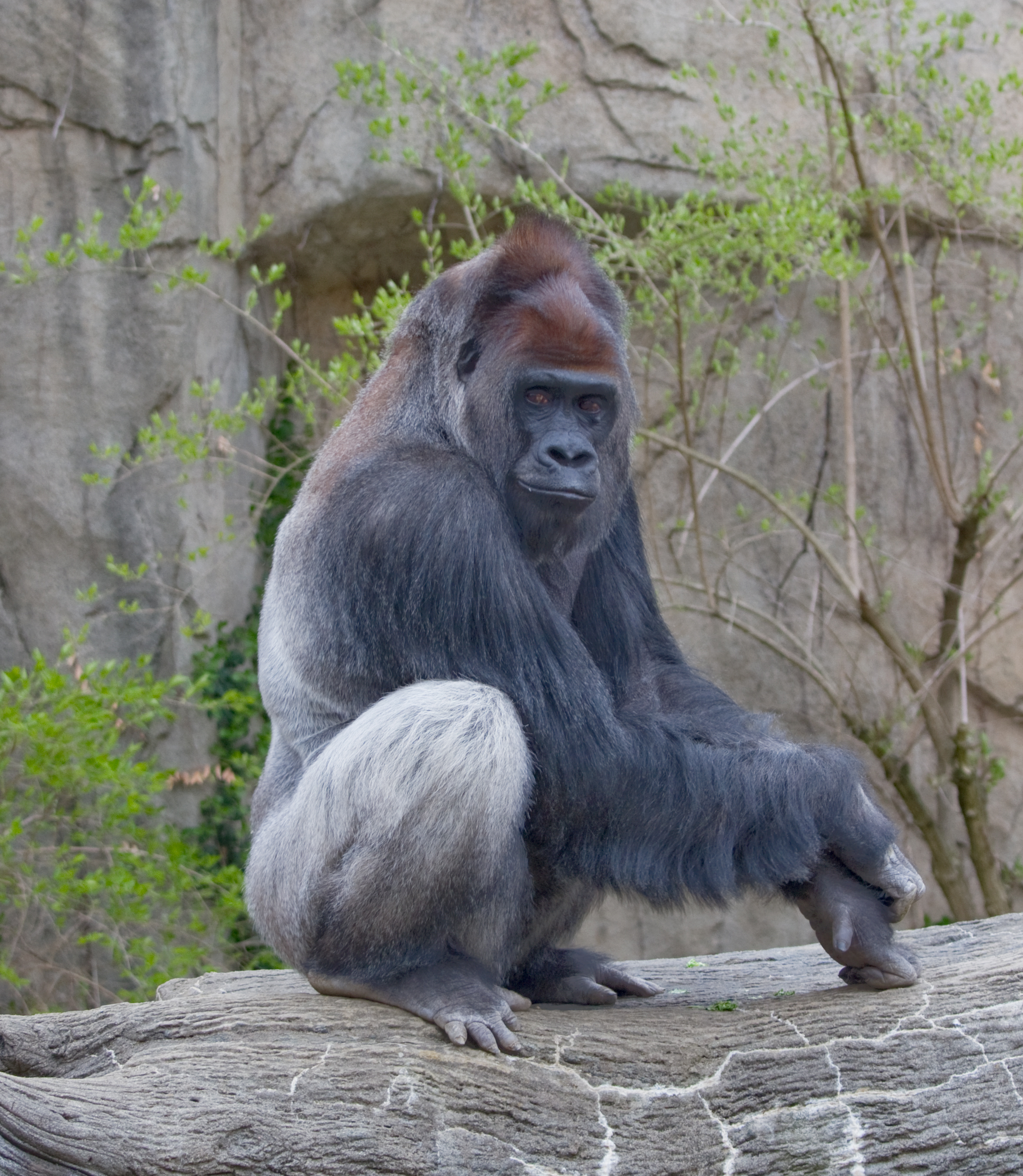
- Silverback
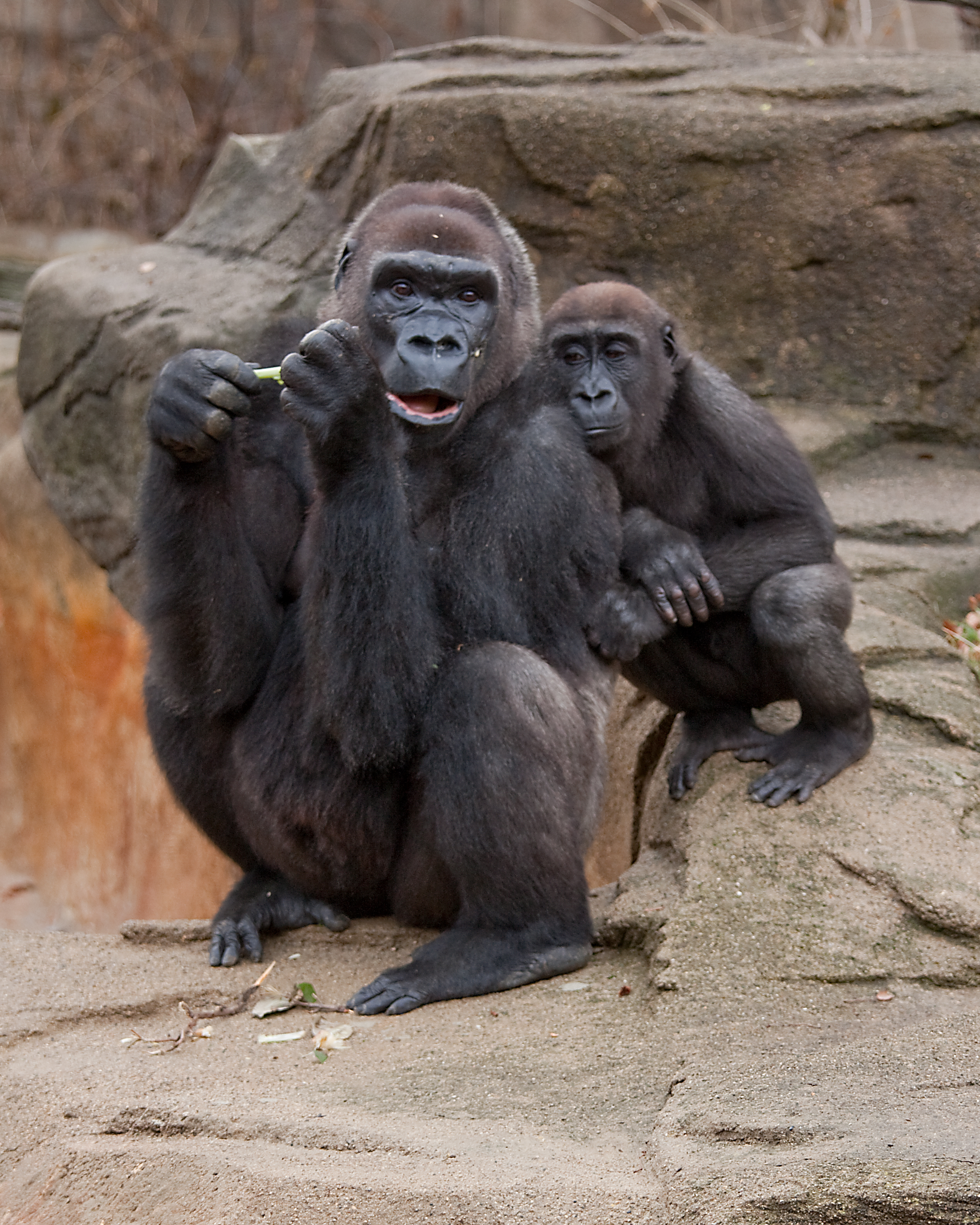
- Adult female and juvenile All photographed at Cincinnati Zoo in Cincinnati, Ohio

Conservation status
- Critically Endangered (IUCN 3.1)
- CITES Appendix I

Scientific classification
- Kingdom: Animalia
- Phylum: Chordata
- Class: Mammalia
- Order: Primates
- Superfamily: Hominoidea
- Family: Hominidae
- Genus: Gorilla
- Species: G. gorilla
- Subspecies: G. g. gorilla

Trinomial name
- Gorilla gorilla gorilla (Savage, 1847)
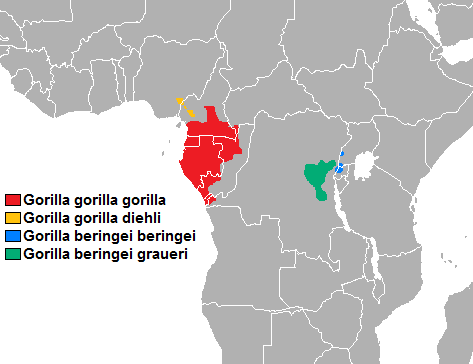
- Distribution range in red

= Western lowland gorilla =

Subspecies of ape

The western lowland gorilla (Gorilla gorilla gorilla) is one of two critically endangered subspecies of the western gorilla (Gorilla gorilla) that lives in montane, primary and secondary forest and lowland swampland in central Africa in Angola (Cabinda Province), Cameroon, Central African Republic, Republic of the Congo, Democratic Republic of the Congo, Equatorial Guinea and Gabon. It is the nominate subspecies of the western gorilla, and the smallest of the four gorilla subspecies.

The western lowland gorilla is the only subspecies kept in zoos with the exception of Amahoro, a female eastern lowland gorilla at Antwerp Zoo, and a few mountain gorillas kept captive in the Democratic Republic of the Congo.

== Description ==
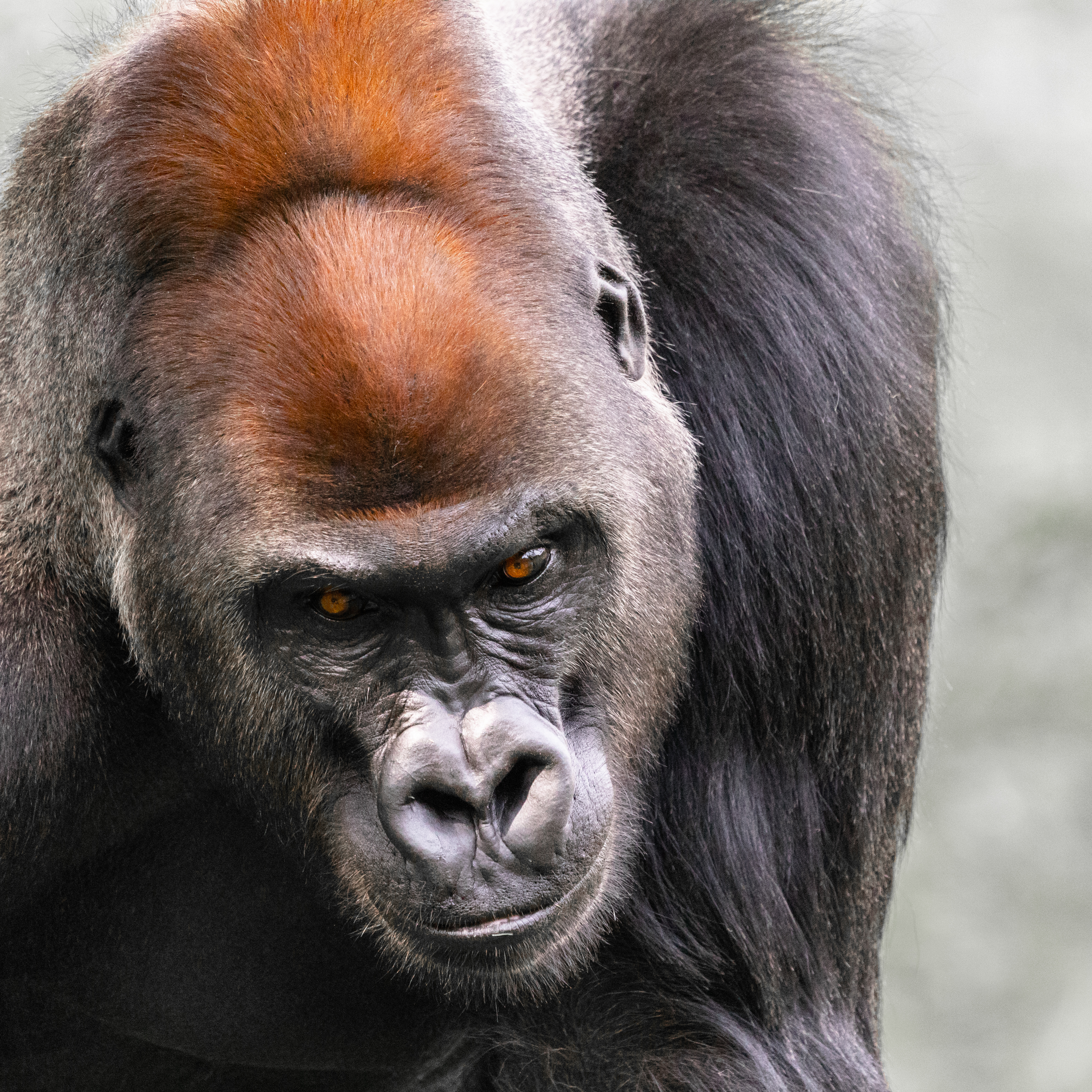
Close-up of male silverback's head at the Leipzig Zoo in Leipzig city, Germany

Skull of a male subject

The western lowland gorilla is the smallest subspecies of gorilla but still has exceptional size and strength. This species of gorillas exhibits pronounced sexual dimorphism. They possess no tails and have jet black skin along with coarse black hair that covers their entire body except for the face, ears, hands and feet. The hair on the back and rump of males takes on a grey coloration and is also lost as they get older. This coloration is the reason why older males are known as "silverbacks". Their hands are proportionately large with nails on all digits (similar to those of humans) and very large thumbs. They have short muzzles, prominent brow ridges, large nostrils and small eyes and ears. Other features are large muscles in the jaw region along with broad and strong teeth. Among these teeth are strong sets of frontal canines and large molars in the back of the mouth for grinding fruits and vegetables.

A male standing erect can be up to 1.83 m (6 ft 0 in) tall and weigh up to 227 kg (500 lb). Males have an average weight of 140 kg (310 lb), females of 70 kg (150 lb). Males in captivity, however, are noted to be capable of reaching weights up to 275 kg (606 lb). Males stand upright at 1.67 m (5 ft 6 in), females at 1.5 m (4 ft 11 in). Zoo owner John Aspinall claimed a silverback gorilla in his prime has the physical strength of seven or eight Olympic weightlifters, but this claim is unverified. Western gorillas frequently stand upright, but walk in a hunched, quadrupedal fashion, with hands curled and knuckles touching the ground; as a result, their arm span is greater than their standing height.

=== Albinism ===
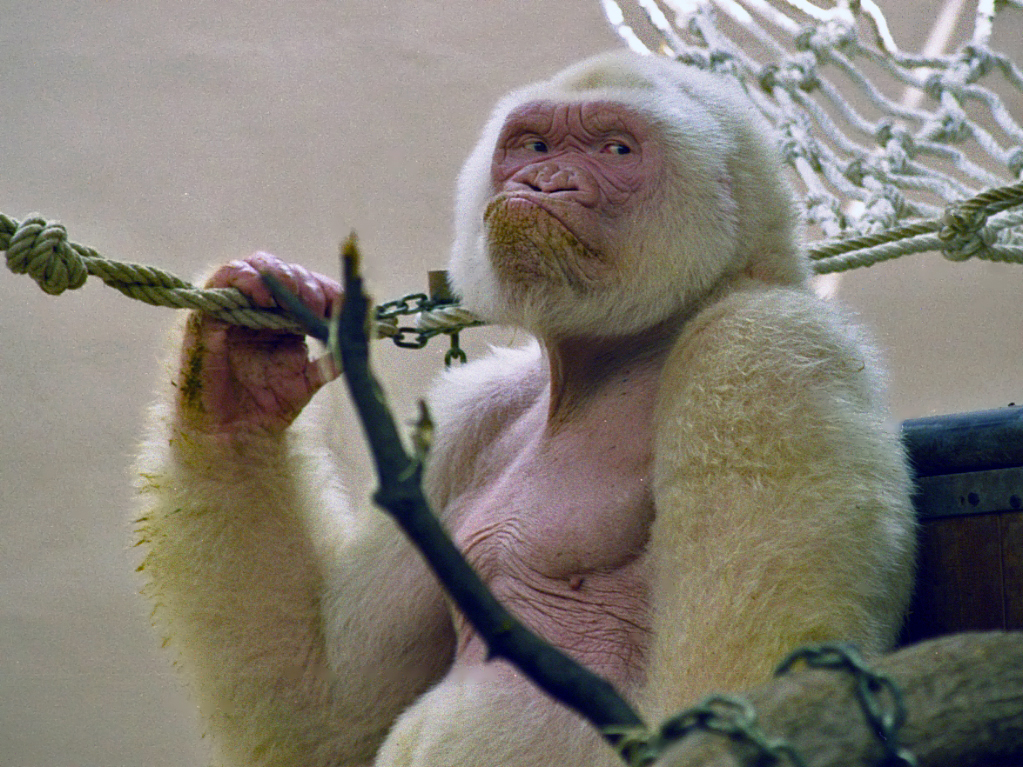
Snowflake in the Barcelona Zoo

The only known albino gorilla – named Snowflake – was a wild-born western lowland gorilla originally from Equatorial Guinea. Snowflake, a male gorilla, was taken from the wild and brought to the Barcelona Zoo in 1966 at a very young age. He presented the typical traits and characteristics of albinism seen in humans, including white hair, pinkish skin, light colored eyes, reduced visual perception and photophobia, and was diagnosed with non-syndromic albinism. The genetic variant for Snowflake's albinism was identified by the scientists as a non-synonymous single nucleotide polymorphism located in a transmembrane region of SLC45A2. This transporter is also known to be involved in oculocutaneous albinism type 4 in humans. As it is a recessive allele, and his parents were an uncle and niece who were both carriers, this revealed the first evidence of inbreeding in western lowland gorillas.

== Behavior ==
=== Social structure ===
Western lowland gorillas at Ueno Zoo in Tokyo, Japan

Western lowland gorilla groups travel within a home range typically between 8 and 45 km^{2} (3 and 17 sq mi) in area. Gorillas do not display territorial behavior, and neighboring groups often overlap ranges. The group usually favours a certain area within the home range, but seems to follow a seasonal pattern depending upon the availability of ripening fruits and, at some sites, localised large open clearings (swamps and "bais"). Gorillas normally travel 3–5 km (1.9–3.1 mi) per day. Populations feeding on high-energy foods that vary spatially and seasonally tend to have greater day ranges than those feeding on lower-quality but more consistently available foods. Larger groups travel greater distances in order to obtain sufficient food.

It is easier for males to travel alone and move between groups, as before reaching the age of sexual maturity, males leave their natal group and go through a "bachelor stage" that can last several years either in solitary or in a nonbreeding group. However, while both sexes leave their birth group, females are always part of a breeding group. Males like to settle with other male members of their family. Their breeding groups consist of one silverback male, three adult females and their offspring. The male gorilla has the role of the protector. Females tend to make bonds with other females in their natal group only, but form strong bonds with males. Males also aggressively compete for contact with females.

The group of gorillas is led by one or more adult males. In cases where there is more than one silverback male in a group, they are most likely father and son. Groups containing only one male are believed to be the basic unit of the social group, gradually growing in size due to reproduction and new members migrating in. In the study done at Lope, gorillas harvest most of their food arboreally, but less than half of their night nests are built in trees. They are often found on the ground, and the group has up to 30 gorillas. Western lowland gorillas live in the smallest family groups of all gorillas, with an average of four to eight members in each. The leader (the silverback) organizes group activities, like eating, nesting and travelling in their home range. Those who challenge this alpha male are apt to be cowed by impressive shows of physical power. He may stand upright, throw things, make aggressive charges, and pound his huge chest with open or cupped hands while barking out powerful hoots or unleashing a frightening roar. Despite these displays and the animals' obvious physical power, gorillas are generally calm and nonaggressive unless they are disturbed. Young gorillas, from three to six years old, remind human observers of children. Much of their day is spent in play, climbing trees, chasing one another and swinging from branches.

=== Reproduction ===
Female western lowland gorillas do not produce many offspring due to the fact that they do not reach sexual maturity until the age of 8 or 9. Female gorillas give birth to one infant after a gestation period of nearly nine months. Female gorillas do not show signs of pregnancy. Unlike their powerful parents, newborns are tiny, weighing 4 lb (1.8 kg), but are able to cling to their mothers' fur. These infants ride on their mothers' backs from the age of four months through the first two or three years of their lives. Infants can be dependent on their mother for up to five years.

A study of over 300 births to captive female gorillas revealed that older females tend to give birth to more male offspring as opposed to females under 8 years old. This pattern is likely to result from selective pressures on females to have males at a time when they can provision them most effectively, as male reproductive success probably varies more than that of females and depends more on the maternal role.

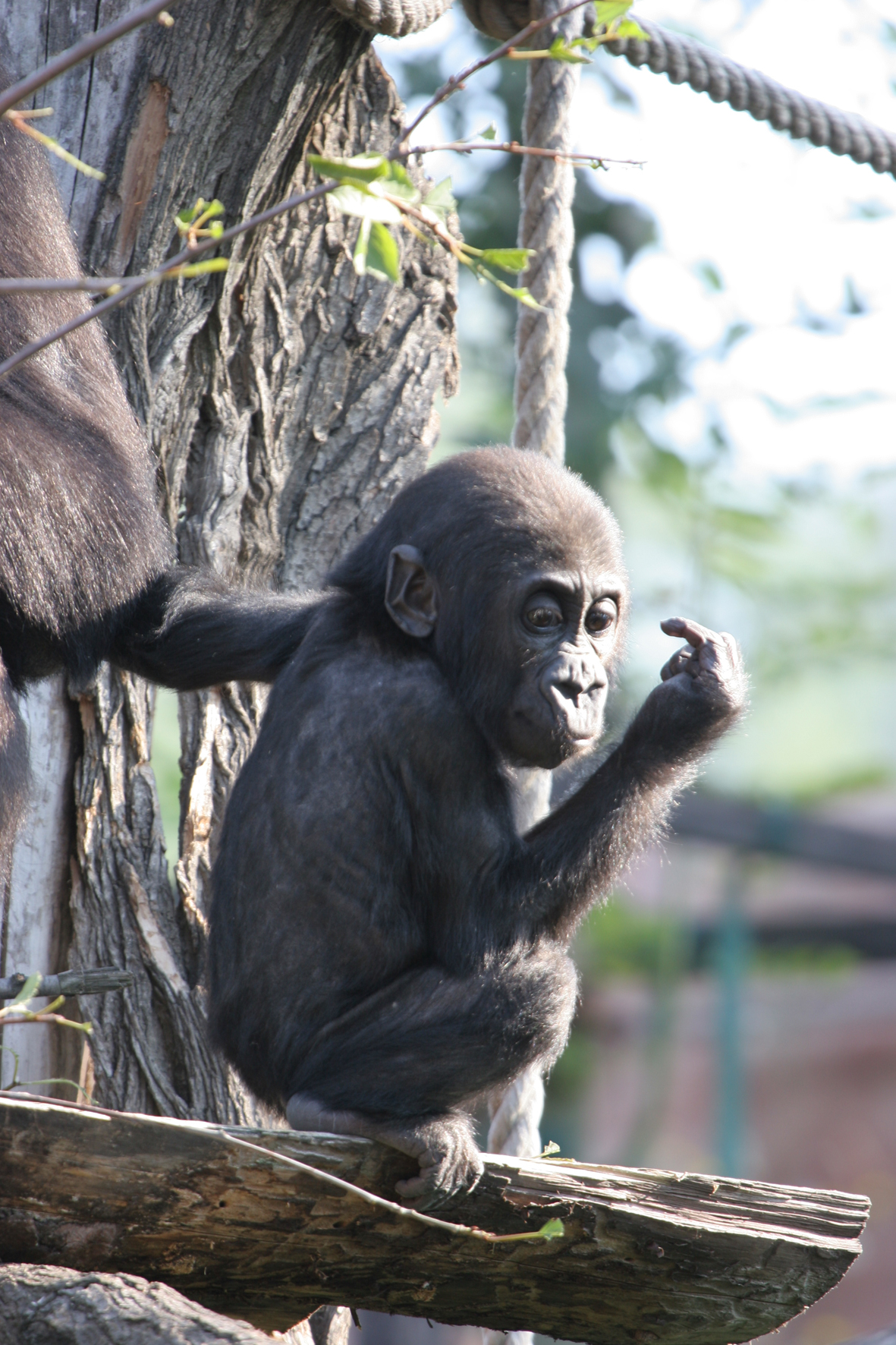
A baby at Praha Zoo in Prague, Czech Republic

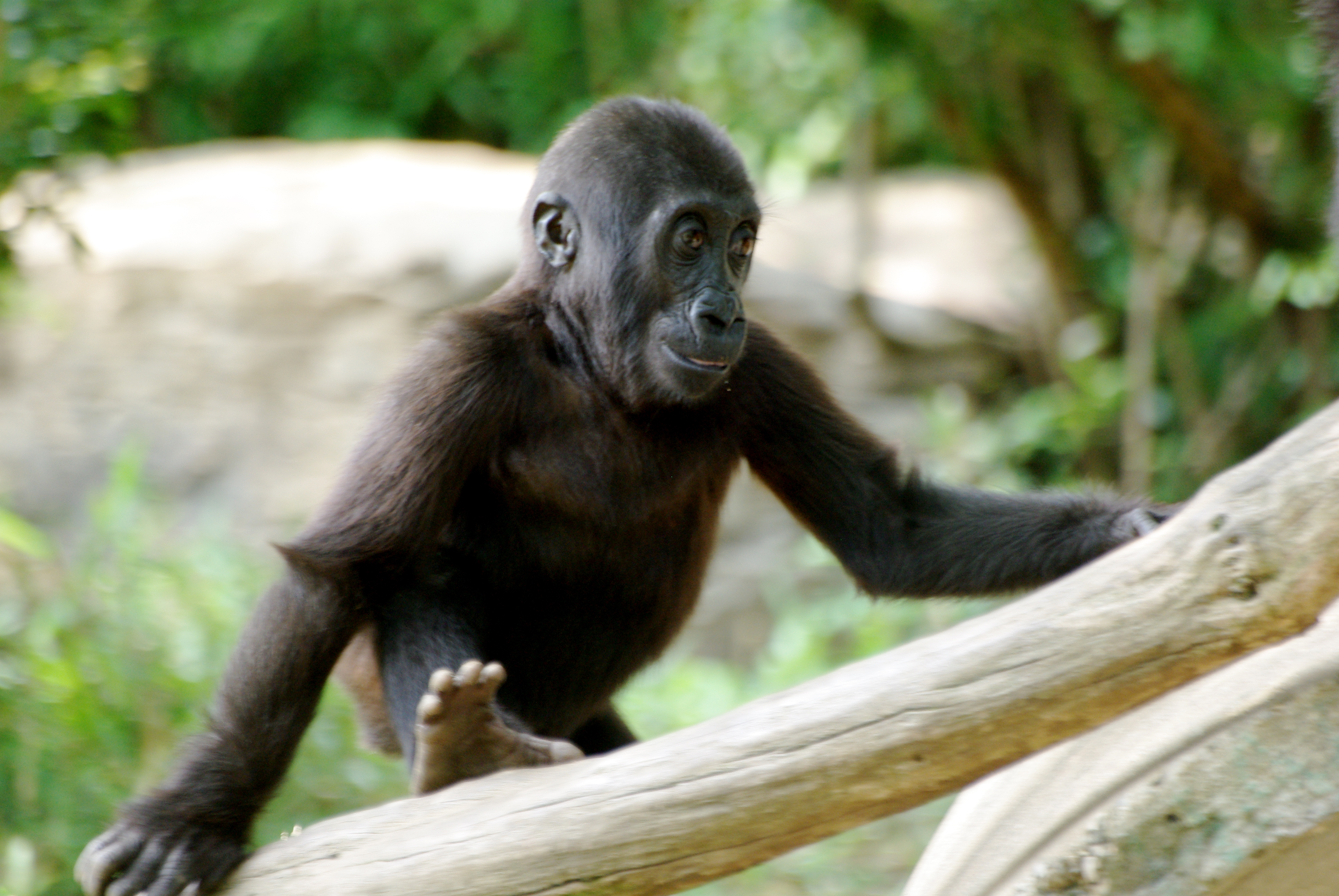
A young western lowland gorilla at the Smithsonian Zoo in Washington, DC

Female western lowland gorillas living in a group led by a single male have been observed to display sexual behavior during all stages of their reproductive cycle and during times of non-fertility. Three out of four females have been observed to engage in sexual behavior while pregnant, and two out of three females have been observed to engage in sexual behavior while lactating. Females are significantly more likely to engage and participate in sexual behavior and activity on a day when another female is sexually active. It has been found that female western lowland gorillas participate in non-reproductive sexual behavior in order to increase their reproductive success through sexual competition. By increasing the female's own reproductive success, she then decreases the reproductive success of other female gorillas, regardless of their reproductive state.

Infanticide by adult male gorillas has occasionally been observed in this subspecies. Victims are never related to the killer. A male does this in order to have the opportunity to mate with the mother, who otherwise would be unavailable while caring for her young offspring.

== Intelligence ==
=== Use of tools ===
Their intelligence is displayed through their ability to fashion natural materials into tools that help them gather food more conveniently.

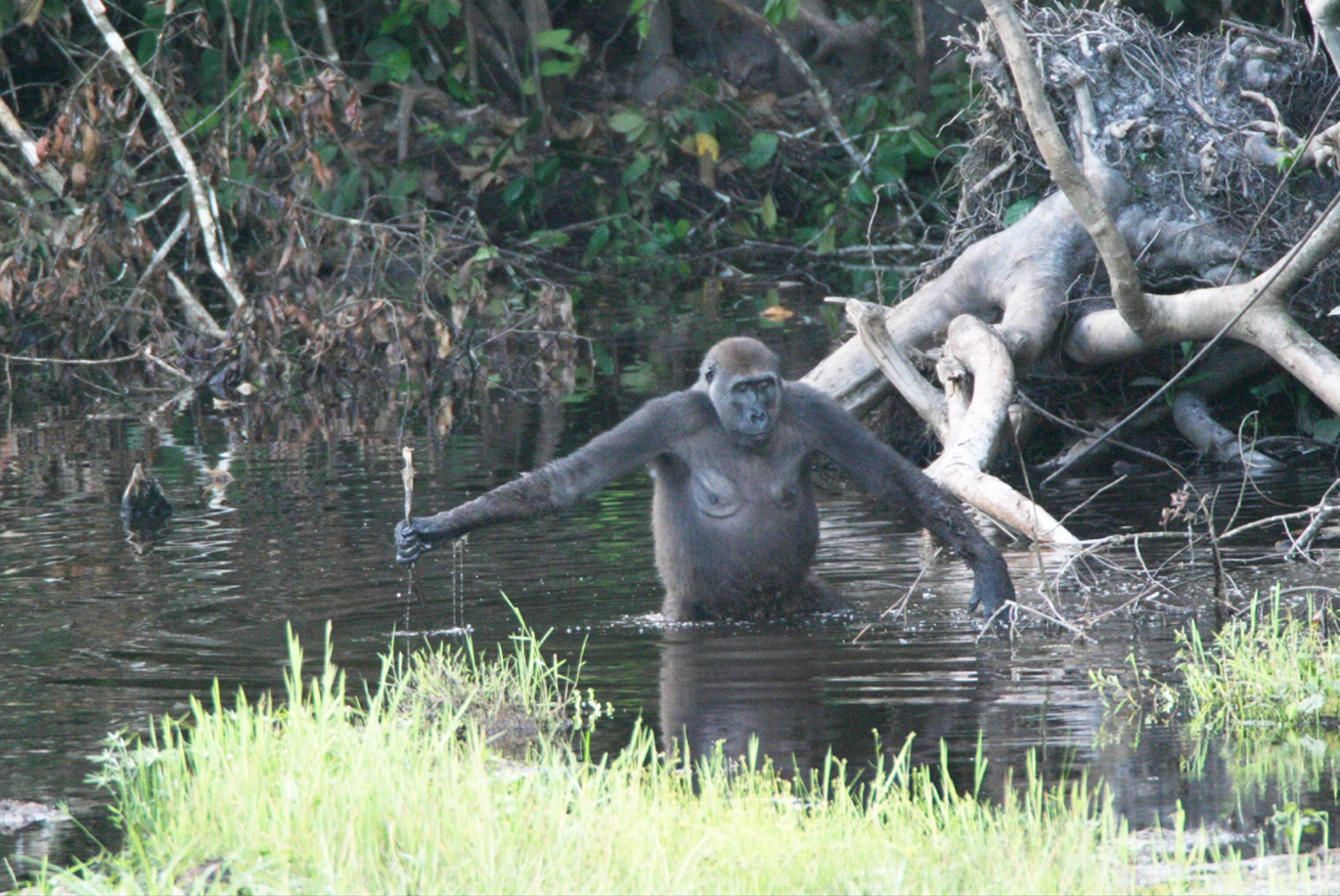
A female gorilla measuring depth of water with a branch at Nouabalé-Ndoki National Park in northern Republic of the Congo, an example of tool use in gorillas

Western lowland gorillas can adapt tools to a particular use by selecting branches, removing projections such as leaves and bark, and adapting their length to the depth of the holes. It appears that they also plan the use of the tool, since they begin with one of the biggest sticks available and progressively modify it until it is the perfect fit for inserting into a hole that contains food. This demonstrates the gorillas' acquisition of high level sensorimotor intelligence, similar to that of young human children.

A gorilla has been observed to use a stick to measure the depth of water. In 2009, a western lowland gorilla at Buffalo Zoological Gardens used a bucket to collect water. In an experiment, one adult male gorilla and three adult female gorillas were given five-gallon buckets near a standing pool. Two of the younger females were able to fill the buckets with water. This is the first record of gorillas spontaneously using tools to drink in zoos.

=== Communication ===
Another example of gorillas' significant intelligence is their ability to comprehend simple sign language. In the mid-1970s, researchers turned their attention to communicating with gorillas via sign language. One gorilla, Koko, was born in San Francisco Zoo on July 4, 1971. Francine Patterson officially started working with Koko on July 12, 1972, with the goal of teaching her sign language. In the beginning, Patterson focused on teaching Koko only three basic signs: "food", "drink", and "more". Koko would learn signs through observation and from Patterson or one of her colleagues molding Koko's hands into the correct sign. On August 7, Patterson began a more formal routine of teaching Koko those three signs. In the couple of weeks before that, Koko had been using gestures that seemed like attempts at the signs taught, but were deemed as coincidental and random and not intended for the actual purpose. Only two days after they started the more formal routine, Koko started responding consistently with the sign "food" when prompted to do so. Within the first three months, Koko made 16 different combinations of signs and was also starting to form simple questions by using eye contact and different positioning of signs by the body. Koko mastered more than 1,000 signs and was said to be able to connect up to eight words together to form a statement expressing wants, needs, thoughts, or simple responses.

There has been a study examining the ability of western lowland gorillas to give to and exchange with humans. This involved humans holding objects such as fruit, leaves or peanuts in one hand. Once the gorillas had given twigs to the humans, they would receive one of these objects. If the gorillas did not give them a twig, they would not get their desired object. The gorillas were shown to quickly learn about receiving rewards, as mistakes made by the gorillas at the beginning of the experiments gradually decreased.

== Ecology ==
=== Habitat ===
Western lowland gorillas primarily live in rainforest, swamp forest, brush, secondary vegetation, clearing and forest edges, abandoned farming fields and riverine forest. They live in primary and secondary lowland tropical forest at elevations that extend from sea level up to 1,300 m (4,300 ft). The average amount of rainfall in the areas where western lowland gorillas typically reside is about 1,500 mm (60 in) a year, with the greatest rainfall between the months of August and November. Western lowland gorillas are not typically observed in areas that are close to human settlements and villages. They have been known to avoid areas with roads and farms that show signs of human activity. These gorillas favor areas where edible plants are more copious. Swamp forest is now considered an important food source and habitat for the western lowland gorilla. These areas support the gorillas in both wet and dry seasons. The forest of the Republic of the Congo is currently considered to host the majority of the western lowland gorilla population. The isolation of the large swampy forest areas protects the gorillas.

=== Diet ===
The western lowland gorilla is primarily herbivorous, and its main diet consists of roots, shoots, fruit, wild celery, tree bark and pulp, which are found in the thick forest of Central and West Africa. During the wet season, gorillas commonly consume fruits. In the dry season, they eat less fleshy fruits, but they continue to eat other kinds of fruits. The diversity of fruits consumed was higher in a poor fruit year, when favored fruit species failed to produce large crops. They may also eat insects from time to time. The common food item which provides fibers is herbaceous stems.

Important food species have been divided into three categories: staple foods which are eaten on a daily/weekly basis throughout the year; seasonal foods which are present in the majority of resources when available; and fallback foods which are always available, but eaten only or mainly during fruit-scarce months. The adult will eat around 18 kg (40 lb) of food per day. Gorillas will climb trees up to 15 meters in height in search of food. They never completely strip vegetation from a single area, since the rapid regrowth of the vegetation allows them to stay within a reasonably confined home range for extended periods of time.

They eat a combination of fruits and foliage, providing a balance of nutrients, depending on the time of year. However, when ripe fruit is available, they tend to eat more fruit as opposed to foliage. When ripe fruit is in scarce supply, they eat leaves, herbs and bark. During the rainy months of July and August, fruit is ripe; however, in the dry seasons, ripe fruit is scarce. Gorillas choose fruit that is high in sugar for energy, as well as fiber.

== Predation ==
In Mbeli Bai, western lowland gorillas may consider West African slender-snouted crocodiles to be a serious threat, based on a strong reluctance to cross waters with crocodiles and a violent reaction to the visual stimuli of crocodiles.

== Relationship with humans ==
The presence of western lowland gorillas has allowed the study of how gorillas compare with humans in regard to human diseases, behavior, and linguistic and psychological aspects of their lives. They are hunted illegally for their skins and meat in Africa and captured to be sold to zoos. While defended as economically profitable for restaurants and local people, such hunting contributes greatly to the endangered status of the western lowland gorilla. They are also seen as a crop pest in western Africa, because they raid plantations, and so destroy valuable crops.

=== Threats ===
==== Hunting and logging ====
In tropical forest, gorillas are hunted to provide meat for the bushmeat trade. Logging also destroys gorilla habitats, although it may also provide increased herbaceous vegetation as a result of gaps in the tree cover. Destruction of gorilla habitat may harm the overall forest ecosystem. Western lowland gorillas are seed dispersers, which is beneficial to many of the animals in the forest, so their extinction could affect many other animals, which could over time destroy their current ecosystem.

==== Population decline and recovery ====
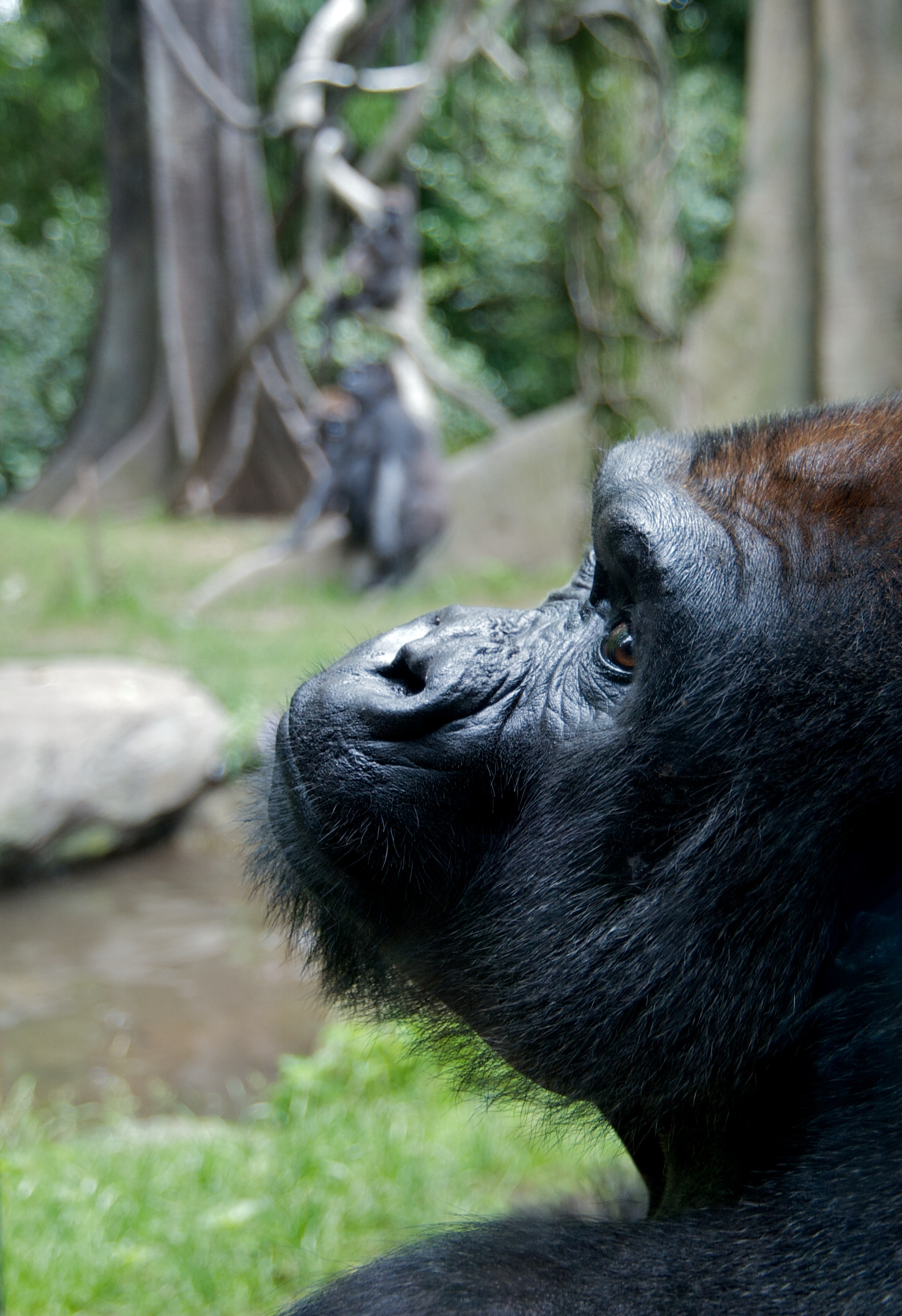
Bronx Zoo

The western lowland gorilla population in the wild faces a number of threats to its survival. These include deforestation, farming, grazing, and the expanding human settlements that cause forest loss. There is a correlation between human intervention in the wild with the destruction of habitats and an increase in bushmeat hunting. Another threat is infertility. Generally, female gorillas mature at 10–12 years of age (or earlier at 7–8 years). Males mature more slowly: they are rarely strong and dominant enough to reproduce before 15–20 years of age. The fecundity of females (their capacity to produce young in great numbers) appears to decline by the age of 18. Of one half of captive females of viable reproductive age, approximately 30% of those had only a single birth. However, those gorillas that do not reproduce may prove to be a valuable resource, since the use of assisted reproductive techniques helps to maintain genetic diversity in the limited populations in zoos.

=== Conservation ===
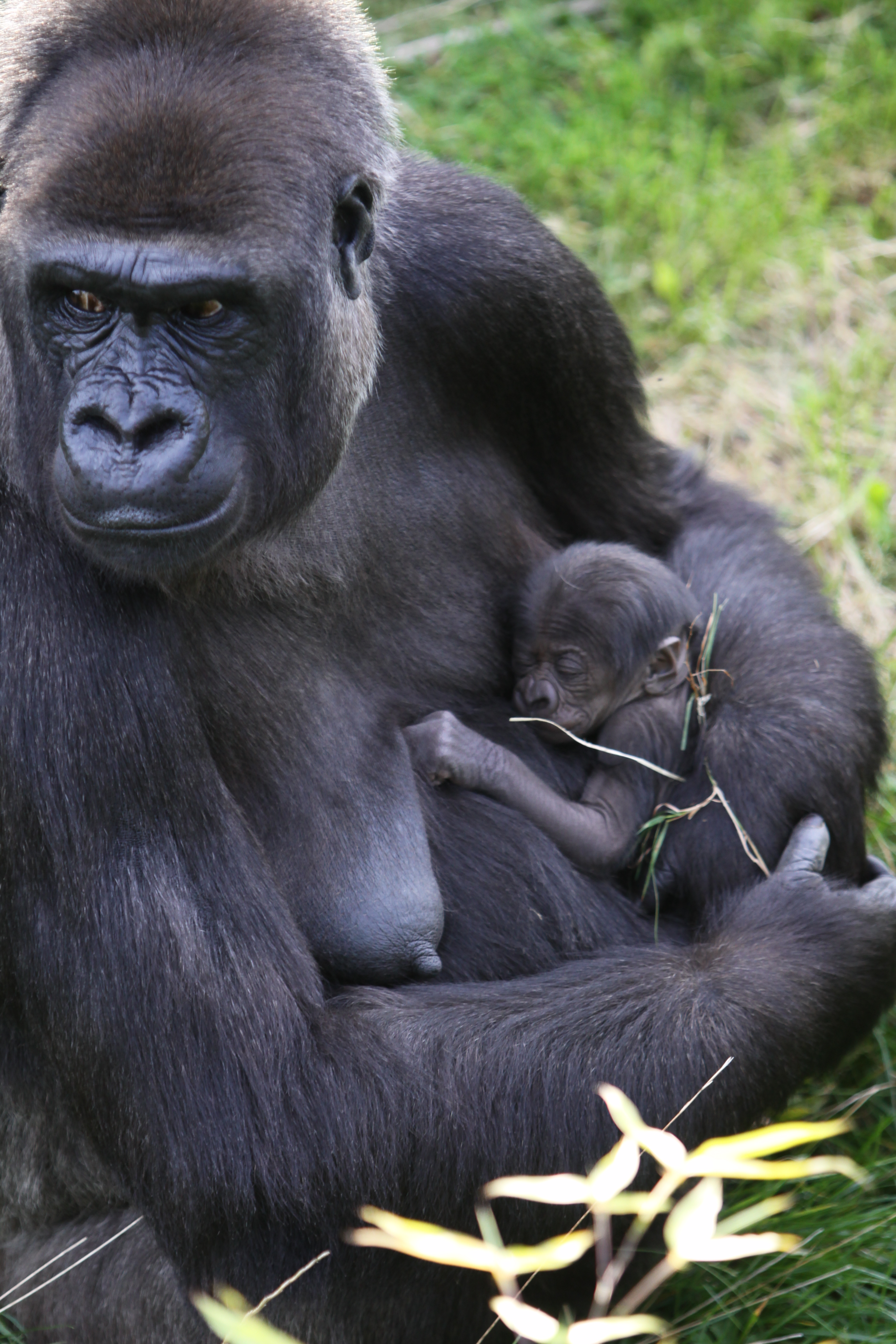
Female western lowland gorilla with newborn baby, at Durrell Wildlife Park

In the 1980s, a census of the gorilla populations in equatorial Africa was thought to be 100,000. Researchers later adjusted the figure to less than half because of poaching and diseases. Surveys conducted by the Wildlife Conservation Society in 2006 and 2007 found about 125,000 previously unreported gorillas have been living in the swamp forests of Lake Télé Community Reserve and in neighboring Marantaceae (dryland) forests in the Republic of the Congo. However, gorillas remain vulnerable to Ebola, deforestation and poaching.

In 2002 and 2003, there was an Ebola outbreak in the Lossi sanctuary population, and in 2004, there was an Ebola outbreak in the Lokoué forest clearing in Odzala-Kokoua National Park, both in the Republic of the Congo. The Ebola outbreak in the Lokoué forest clearing negatively affected the individuals living in groups and the adult females more than the solitary males, resulting in an increase in the proportion of solitary males to those living in groups. This population decreased from 377 individuals to 38 individuals two years after the outbreak and to 40 individuals six years after the outbreak. The population is still slowly recovering, even today, it is hoped, towards a population that has the same demographic structure as an unaffected population, because of new births and breeding groups. This Ebola outbreak also affected the Maya Nord population (52 kilometres northwest from Lokoué) from 400 individuals to considerably fewer. Because of these outbreaks, the International Union for Conservation of Nature (IUCN) updated the status of western lowland gorillas from "endangered" to "critically endangered".

In the northeastern part of the Republic of the Congo, western lowland gorillas are still being hunted for their bushmeat and the young for pets; five percent of the subspecies is killed each year because of this. Deforestation of this area allows for the trade of bushmeat and even more poaching. Commercial poaching of chimpanzees, forest elephants and western gorillas in the Republic of the Congo resulted from the increased amount of commercial logging and infrastructure. Deforestation and logging allowed for the creation of roads which allowed hunters to hunt deeper into the forest, increasing the amount of poaching and bushmeat trade in the area. The Republic of the Congo has put in place a conservation effort to conserve different species such as chimpanzees, forest elephants and western gorillas from poaching and deforestation. This conservation effort would allow these species to benefit from vegetation and ecologically important resources.

Bush meat hunting and timber harvesting in the western lowland gorilla's habitat have negatively affected the probability of its survival. The western lowland gorilla is considered to be critically endangered by the IUCN. The western lowland gorillas, like many gorillas, are essential to the composition of the rainforest due to their seed distribution. The conservation of the western lowland gorilla has been made a priority by many organizations. The Wildlife Conservation Society (WCS) has been working with the local community in the Congo Basin to establish wildlife management programs. The WCS is also working in Congo and surrounding countries to limit the bush meat trade by enforcing laws and hunting restrictions and also helping the local people find new sources of protein.

Zoos worldwide have a population of 550 western lowland gorillas, and the Cincinnati Zoo leads the United States in western lowland gorilla births.

== In captivity ==
=== Stress ===
Stress has been known to cause both physiological and behavioral chronic issues for captive species including, but not limited to, altered reproductive cycling and behavior, reduced immune responses, disrupted hormone and growth levels, reduced body weight, heightened abnormal activities and aggression and decreased exploratory behavior with increased hiding behaviors. Such stress reactions could be caused by sounds, light conditions, odors, temperature and humidity conditions, material makeup of enclosures, habitat size constraints, lack of proper hiding areas, forced closeness to humans, routine husbandry and feeding conditions, or abnormal social groups to name a few. Use of both internal and external privacy screens on exhibit windows has been shown to alleviate stresses from visual effects of high crowd densities, leading to decreased stereotypic behaviors in the gorillas. Playing naturalistic auditory stimuli as opposed to classical music, rock music, or no auditory enrichment (which allows for crowd noise, machinery, etc. to be heard) has been noted to reduce stress behavior as well. Enrichment modifications to feed and foraging, where clover-hay is added to an exhibit floor, decrease stereotypic activities while simultaneously increasing positive food-related behaviors.

=== Stereotypic behaviors ===
Stereotypic behaviors are abnormal or compulsive behaviors. It is common for non-human primates kept in captivity to exhibit behaviors deviating from the normal behavior observed of them in the wilderness. In captive gorillas, such frequent aberrant behaviors include eating disorders—such as regurgitation, reingestion and coprophagy—self-injurious or conspecific aggression, pacing, rocking, sucking of fingers or lip smacking, and overgrooming. Negative vigilance of visitor behaviors have been identified as starting, posturing and charging at visitors. Groups of bachelor gorillas containing young silverbacks have significantly higher levels of aggression and wounding rates than mixed age and sex groups.

A particularly abnormal behavior is hair-plucking, which occurs across many species of mammals and birds. Studies made on the topic show that of all the western lowland gorillas housed in the Association of Zoos and Aquariums (AZA) population, 15% of the surveyed population displayed hair-plucking behavior with 62% of all institutions housing a hair-plucker. Individual gorillas, particularly those of a more solitary nature, are more likely to self-pluck using their fingers and pick up this behavior if they were exposed to a group member that plucked their hair as a youngster and not yet mature gorilla.

Recent research on captive gorilla welfare emphasizes a need to shift to individual assessments instead of a one-size-fits-all group approach to understanding how welfare increases or decreases based on a variety of factors. Individual characteristics such as age, sex, personality and individual histories are essential in understanding that stressors will affect each individual gorilla and their welfare differently.

== Genetics ==
Genomic information
- NCBI ID: 9595
- Ploidy: diploid
- Genome size: 3,035.66 Mb
- Number of chromosomes: 23 pairs
- Year of completion: 2012

The gorilla became the next-to-last great ape genus to have its genome sequenced. This was done in 2012. This has given scientists further insight into the evolution and origin of humans. Despite the chimpanzees being the closest extant relatives of humans, 15% of the human genome was found to be more like that of the gorilla. In addition, 30% of the gorilla genome "is closer to human or chimpanzee than the latter are to each other; this is rarer around coding genes, indicating pervasive selection throughout great ape evolution, and has functional consequences in gene expression". Analysis of the gorilla genome has cast doubt on the idea that the rapid evolution of hearing genes gave rise to language in humans, as it also occurred in gorillas.

Furthermore, in 2013, a study was conducted in order to better understand the genetic variation in gorillas by using reduced representation sequencing. This study consisted of a sample of 12 western lowland gorillas and two eastern lowland gorillas, all in captivity. The study found that western lowland gorillas are more likely to be heterozygous than homozygous. Most pure (meaning they are not inbred) western lowland gorillas have a hom/het ratio that ranges from 0.5 to 0.7. Therefore, because of variation in these gorillas, it has been concluded that they display a moderate substructure within the western lowland population in general. Finally, the study sought out to analyze the allele frequency spectrum (AFS) in western lowland gorillas. The reason why is that AFS knowledge can help give information regarding demographics and evolutionary processes. The AFS has determined that western lowland gorillas display a deficit of rare alleles.

== Disease ==
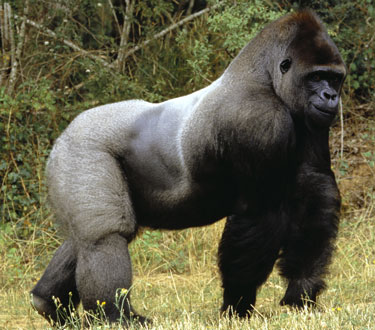

Western lowland gorillas are believed to be one of the zoonotic origins of HIV/AIDS. The SIV or simian immunodeficiency virus that infects them is similar to a certain strain of HIV-1. The HIV-1 virus exhibits phylogeographic clustering, which is due to large rivers. This clustering allows pinpointing the probable geographic origins of two of the human virus clades. In the southern part of Cameroon, the populations of western lowland gorillas have had examinations of their feces. Out of 2,934 gorilla samples, 70 reacted with at least one HIV-1 antigen. These samples came from four field sites, all located in southern Cameroon.

The origin of AIDS has been linked to a virus known to infect more than 40 species of nonhuman primates in Africa. HIV-1, is composed of four phylogenetic lineages, which at some point in time have independently gone through cross-species transmission of SIV. The simian immunodeficiency virus infected various African primates such as gorillas and chimpanzees.

Disease has also been a factor in the survival of the western lowland gorilla. The Ebola epizootic in western and central Africa has caused more than 90% mortality rate in western lowland gorillas. From 2003 to 2004, two epizootics infected the western lowland gorilla, which caused two-thirds of their population to disappear. The outbreak was monitored in the Republic of Congo by Magdalena Bermejo and other field-based primatologists, as it also spread to humans through contact with bushmeat. The catastrophe led the World Conservation Union to designate the western lowland gorilla a critically endangered species. Malaria is also an issue that has been arising for the western lowland gorillas. Out of 51 faecal samples from habituated individuals, 25 were shown to have Plasmodium DNA. Laverania, which is a subgenus of the parasitic protozoan genus Plasmodium, was found in these studies. Varying exposure to different Anopheles mosquitoes transmitting Plasmodium species is known to be the origin of malaria in western lowland gorillas.

Wild western lowland gorillas are known to consume the seeds of the "grains of paradise" plant, apparently conferring healthy cardiovascular conditions from their consumption—the occasionally poor cardiovascular health of lowland gorillas in zoos has been postulated to be due to the lack of availability of the Aframomum seeds in zoo gorillas' diets. Adult male gorillas are prone to fibrosing cardiomyopathy, a degenerative heart disease.

== See also ==
- List of individual apes
- Cross River gorilla - Another western gorilla subspecies
- Mefou National Park
