= Hyperolius brachiofasciatus =

Conservation status
- Data Deficient (IUCN 3.1)

Scientific classification
- Kingdom: Animalia
- Phylum: Chordata
- Class: Amphibia
- Order: Anura
- Family: Hyperoliidae
- Genus: Hyperolius
- Species: H. brachiofasciatus

Binomial name
- Hyperolius brachiofasciatus Ahl, 1931

Species of frog

Hyperolius Brachiofasciatus is a species of frog in the family Hyperoliidae. It is known from its type locality, Ngoto in southwestern Central African Republic, from another locality in central Republic of the Congo, and from a number of localities in central Democratic Republic of the Congo. However, as of 2014, IUCN SSC Amphibian Specialist Group considers records other than the one from the type locality erroneous, and that this species likely is a synonym of some other species. Common name Ngoto Reed Frog has been proposed for it.

== Description ==
Adult males measure 22–28 mm (0.9–1.1 in) and adult females 24–29 mm (0.9–1.1 in) in snout–vent length. Phase "J" individuals have light brown dorsum, often with darker spots that sometimes form an hourglass pattern. The border between the dorsal colour and the dark, irregular lateral band is sharp. The canthal area of head is dark; a dark bar is present between the eyes, with a broad apex pointing backwards. The tibia are light brown with a dark oblique band. Phase "F" individuals have dark dorsum with light spots or with dark and light marbling.

== Habitat and Conservation ==
Hyperolius Brachiofasciatus is a poorly known species, with no information on its habitat, ecology, or population status. Threats to it are unknown. It is recorded from the Nouabalé-Ndoki National Park in the Republic of the Congo (but see IUCN Red List of Threatened Species).
