= Fibrosing cardiomyopathy =

Disease of great apes

Fibrosing cardiomyopathy is a disease commonly caused by a heart failure in great apes, most specially the males. When fibrosing cardiomyopathy attacks a healthy heart, it comes with a bacterium or a virus that makes the muscles of the heart turn into fibrous bands which makes them unable to pump blood in the blood streams. When a gorilla is stressed, or the food it eats, then catecholamine which is a harmful substance is released in the heart muscle that make the C-reactive protein that is found in blood plasma produced by the liver to swell, causing rheumatoid arthritis.

== Contrast Analysis ==
Studies show that the causes of heart disease differ greatly between humans and chimpanzees. In this study, the scientists provided some new data and summarized existing reports on the subject. They also allow other primitives to have limited data, suggesting that they are more like chimpanzees in this respect. In general, the result is that heart disease does not represent a similarity between humans and other hominids, but rather an inexplicably special difference. Finally, the preliminary evidence of differences in extracellular matrix and glycosylation patterns between human and human-like hearts are proved and provided, which may be related to the understanding of these differences. Heart disease was the cause of 16 of the 52 deaths at Yakex primate research center between 1992 and 2005, and cardiac biopsies were carefully examined. This includes 9 animals (8 males, (1) dying females, (3) looking at the animals' serious animals (2 males, females). Almost all of these pathological abnormalities of death are associated with this type of FMI. Chimpanzees are very similar. An example shows a chimpanzee which goes through the heart muscle without hemiplegia, and heaven goes directly around the blood vessels, which can be seen in some people's hearts. For other reasons, the death of the Yerkes center also indicates that myocardial fibrosis was severe during this period of 14 men and 4 women, autopsies were fragmented by the IMF.

== Food used to alleviate illness ==
Scientists have begun to study how billions of bacteria, fungi and other microbes living in the stomach and intestines of humans affect our health for the last few decades. What we eat determines which of these microorganisms thrive, and the composition of the intestinal flora has a great influence on other parts of our body. For example, some intestinal bacteria cause inflammation in our immune system, while other bacteria secrete substances that penetrate blood or block arteries, which helps explain why heart disease patients have different microbes and health conditions. Grains of paradise are plants that grow in swampy areas in West Africa-vine chocked swamps a member of the ginger family. It is a plant that gorillas like eating but it contains a powerful anti- swollen compound. It grows up to 1.5 meters with a trumpet shape and reddish-brown seeds. Gorillas do use the plant to make nests on the ground and beds that they use over the night for sleeping; they also use the seeds to treat coughs, toothaches and measles. The plant also provides comfort and warmth to the weak and cold bodies of the gorilla. The invention of processed high-calorie cookies containing vitamins and nutrients and the addition of several fruits and vegetables ultimately helped to standardize the diet of gorillas. The animal biscuit diet begins to prolong life and looks healthier and can sometimes survive for 50 years. The researches found that the biscuit diet has many shortcomings. Although gorillas are genetically similar to humans, their digestive systems are very different and more like horses. Like a horse, a gorilla is a digestive organ that processes food primarily in the very long large intestine, not in the stomach. This means they are good for breaking down the fiber, but not very good for sugar or grain. If the zookeeper feed them sweet potatoes or commercially grown fruit, they will eat them but that didn't bring much energy to them.

== Category and symptoms ==
There are different types of cardiomyopathy which include a hypertrophic cardiomyopathy which makes the heart muscles to enlarge and thicken; dilated cardiomyopathy happens when the ventricles enlarge and weaken; restrictive cardiomyopathy makes the ventricles to stiffen; Hypertrophic cardiomyopathy is an inherited one from one generation to another and dilated cardiomyopathy results due to heavy alcohol consumption, use of cocaine and viral infections. The signs and symptoms of cardiomyopathy include; shortness of breath, fatigue, swelling in the legs, dizziness, lightheadedness, fainting during physical activities, irregular heartbeats, chest pain after heavy meals and unusual sounds associated with heartbeats. Gorillas inhabited the forests of central sub-Saharan Africa whereby they were divided into two species; the eastern gorillas and the western gorillas. They are much closer to humans because the DNA reveals a higher percentage between 95 and 99%. They fall under kingdom Mammalia same as the human and both have the same origin of common ancestors. Gorillas are considered to be a single species with three subspecies i.e. the western lowland gorilla, the eastern lowland gorilla and the mountain gorilla. Both the species became one after their forest habitat shrank and ended up separating. With gorillas that were captive by human, started developing fibrosing cardiomyopathy due to the foods that humans used to give them like biscuits diet which had much sugar and this made it difficult with digestion because of their hindgut digesters which processed food in their extra-long large intestines instead of their stomachs and had lesser energy distribution in their bodies. The new diet lowered the body fat and cholesterol and ended up affecting the bacteria living in gorillas' stomachs. A heart attack in humans occurs due to chest pain, sweating or even shortness of breath that results due to coronary artery having a problem in supplying blood into the heart muscle while with the gorillas, it happens due to the diet that the ones in captives used to take. Humans, who do not suffer from an acute coronary heart attack, do end up having a heart failure due to a gradual decrease of blood supply in the arteries. Both gorillas and humans have an unusual form of interstitial myocardial fibrosis whereby a normal myocardium in both humans and gorillas are quite similar to each other. The gorilla's heart fibrosis has been distributed in an unorderly manner in the cardiac muscle as seen in human.

== Prevention ==
After so many attempts on how to prevent the fibrosing from attacking gorillas, the zookeepers came with the ideas of how they could reduce the mortality rate of the gorillas i.e. the introduction of a National Gorilla Cardiac Database which will be used in tracking cases of the disease to those gorillas that were in captivity in the western lowland; Introduction of a tab that determines the populations of the gorillas and also comparing the ultrasound waves that is to produce a visual display of the heart from a healthy gorilla to a sick gorilla so that they can detect the presence of the disease; Implantation of an advanced pacemaker in a gorilla that has the disease so that pacemaker can detect the disease at an early stage and also correcting the breakdown of the heart's electrical circuit that comes with the disease which later restores the heart to pump properly.

Heart failure is considered to be common in both human and the gorillas which could be determined as a heart failure or a cardiac arrest to some point. When analysis is taken into an accord, a human heart attack would be considered to have occurred due to coronary artery atherosclerosis which happens when the arteries are hardened due to a buildup of plaque inside the walls of the arteries while for the gorillas it will be considered to have occurred due to the bacteria in the muscles of the heart that prevents the heart from pumping the blood properly into the arteries and the veins.

== Overview ==
Fibrosing cardiomyopathy is a type of a heart disease that affects the family of gorillas from West Africa that are in captive by humans due to the area that they live in and also the type of food they eat. Grains of paradise are a type of plants that grow in swampy areas and it has been discovered to be the favorite plant that gorillas like to eat. The plant contains a powerful anti-swollen compound that attacks the heart of the gorillas which makes the coronary arteries of their hearts to have a poor functioning in the supply of blood into the heart muscles. This disease attacks male gorillas that are 30 years and above and so far, the exact treatment has not yet been found but measures have been put in place in order to take control of the disease and reduce the mortality rate in the gorilla's family.
