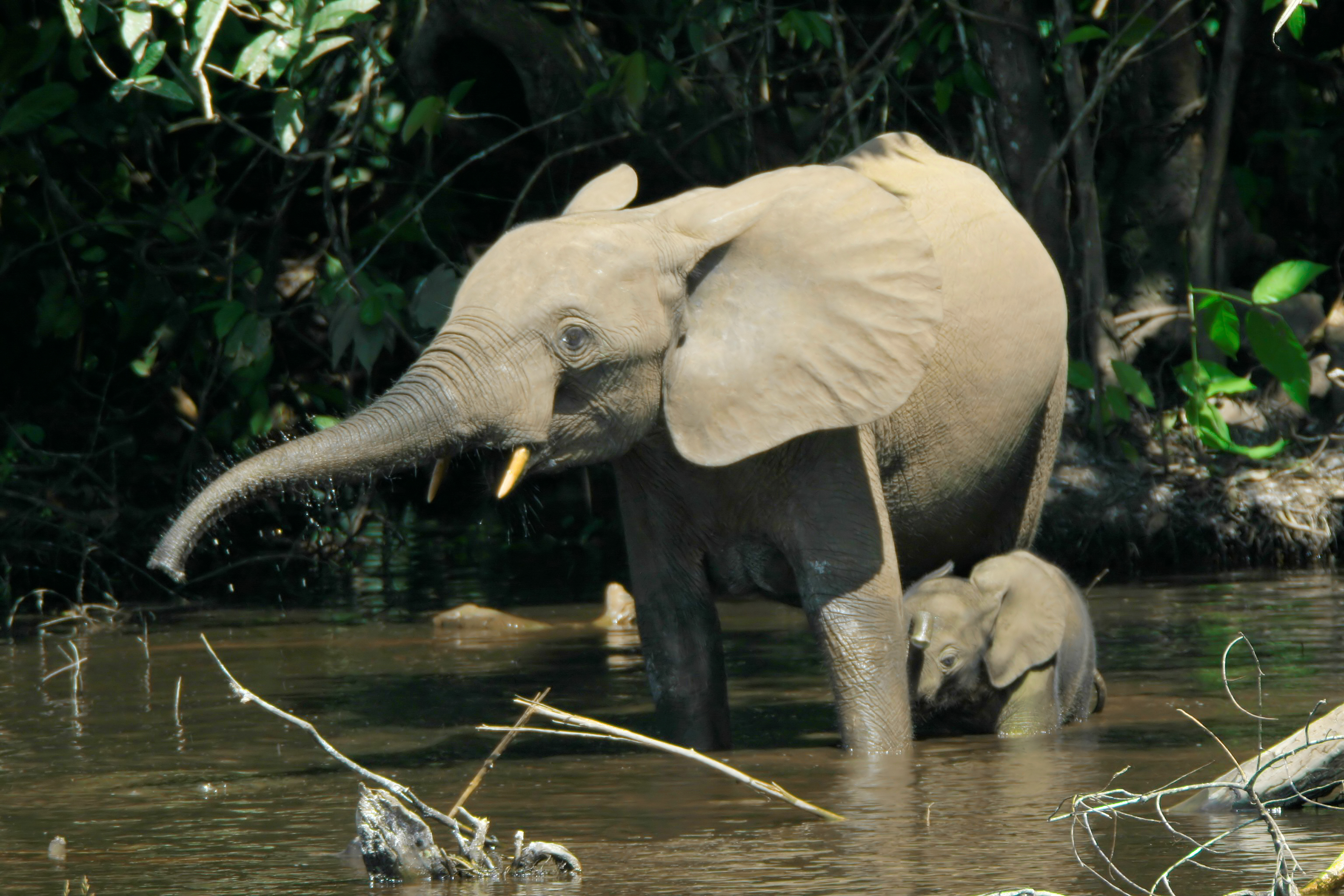
- African forest elephants in Nouabalé-Ndoki National Park

Conservation status
- Critically Endangered (IUCN 3.1)
- CITES Appendix I

Scientific classification
- Kingdom: Animalia
- Phylum: Chordata
- Class: Mammalia
- Order: Proboscidea
- Family: Elephantidae
- Genus: Loxodonta
- Species: L. cyclotis

Binomial name
- Loxodonta cyclotis (Matschie, 1900)
- Range of the African forest elephant Resident Possibly extant (resident) Possibly extinct

= African forest elephant =

African forest elephant Temporal range: Pleistocene–Recent

African elephant species

The African forest elephant (Loxodonta cyclotis) is an elephant species native to humid tropical forests in West Africa and the Congo Basin. It was first described in 1900. With an average shoulder height of 2.16 m (7 ft 1 in), it is the smallest of the three extant elephant species. Both sexes have straight, down-pointing tusks, which begin to grow at the age of 1–3 years.

The African forest elephant lives in highly sociable family groups of up to 20 individuals comprising adult cows, their daughters and sons. When young bulls reach sexual maturity, they separate from the family group and form loose bachelor groups for a short time, but usually stay alone. Adult bulls associate with family groups only during the mating season.

The African forest elephant forages on leaves, seeds, fruit, and tree bark of at least 96 plant species. Since it disseminates partly digested seeds for at least 5 km (3.1 mi) through its droppings, it contributes significantly to maintaining the diversity and structure of the Guinean Forests of West Africa and the Congolese rainforests.

During the 20th century, overhunting caused a sharp decline of the African forest elephant population, and by 2013 it was estimated that fewer than 30,000 individuals remained. It is threatened by habitat loss, fragmentation, and poaching. The conservation status of populations varies across range countries. Since 2021, it has been listed as Critically Endangered on the IUCN Red List.

== Taxonomy ==
Elephas (Loxodonta) cyclotis was the scientific name proposed by Paul Matschie in 1900 who described the skulls of a female and a male specimen collected by the Sanaga River in southern Cameroon.

=== Phylogeny and evolution ===
The African forest elephant was long considered to be a subspecies of the African elephant, together with the African bush elephant. Morphological and DNA analysis showed that they are two distinct species.

The taxonomic status of the African pygmy elephant (Loxodonta pumilio) was uncertain for a long time. Phylogenetic analysis of the mitochondrial genome of nine specimens from museum collections indicates that it is an African forest elephant whose diminutive size or early maturity is due to environmental conditions.

Phylogeny showing the relationship between living and extinct elephantids showing hybridisation between African forest elephants and Palaeoloxodon, represented by the straight-tusked elephant (Palaeoloxodon antiquus), resulting in introgressive gene flow from African forest elephants into Palaeoloxodon.

Phylogenetic analysis of nuclear DNA of African bush and forest elephants, Asian elephants, woolly mammoths and American mastodons revealed that the African forest elephant and African bush elephant are two distinct species that genetically diverged at least 1.9 million years ago. They are therefore considered distinct species. Despite evidence of hybridization between the two species where their ranges overlap, there appears to have been little gene flow between the two species since their initial divergence, though a 2026 study found that there was detectable recent gene flow between African forest and bush elephants within the last 200 years and many modern bush elephants have trace levels of forest elephant ancestry.

Analysis of ancient DNA from the extinct European straight-tusked elephant (Palaeoloxodon antiquus) indicates that members of the extinct elephant genus Palaeoloxodon hybridized with African forest elephants, resulting in substantial introgressive flow of African forest elephant genetic material into Palaeoloxodon due to backcrossing, with over 1/3 of the nuclear genome as well as the entirety of the mitochondrial genome of the straight-tusked elephant deriving from that of African forest elephants, with the genomic contribution more closely related to modern West African populations of the forest elephant than to other populations. Palaeoloxodon carried multiple separate mitochondrial lineages derived from forest elephants which had completely replaced the original Palaeoloxodon mitochondrial lineage, which were carried among European straight-tusked elephants, Chinese Palaeoloxodon, and the Japanese Palaeoloxodon naumanni, indicating this ancestry was widespread in Eurasian Palaeoloxodon populations. This hybridisation is suggested to have occurred around 1 million years ago, shortly prior to Palaeoloxodon leaving Africa.

== Description ==
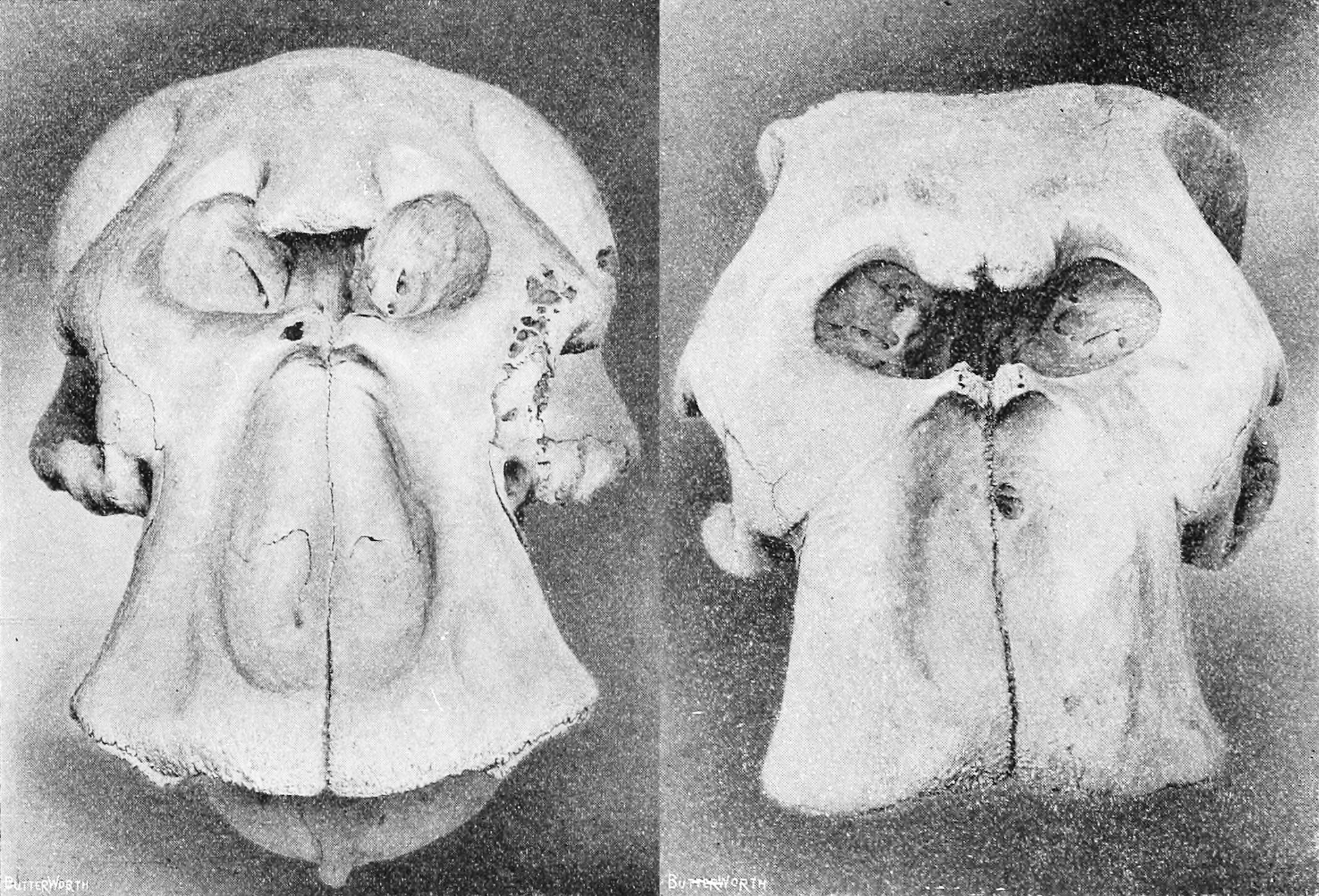
Skulls of African bush elephant (left) and African forest elephant (right)

The African forest elephant is considerably smaller than the African bush elephant, though the size of the species has been subject to contradictory estimates. A 2000 study suggested that bulls of the species reach a shoulder height of 2.4–3 m (7.9–9.8 ft), and weighed 4–7 t (4.4–7.7 short tons), while cows were about 1.8–2.4 m (5.9–7.9 ft) tall at the shoulder and 2–4 t (2.2–4.4 short tons). However, a 2003 study of forest elephants at a reserve in Gabon did not find any elephants taller than 2.16 m (7.1 ft). A 2015 study alternately suggested that fully grown African forest elephant males in optimal condition were only on average 2.2 m (7.2 ft) tall and 2 t (2.2 short tons) in weight, with the largest individuals (representing less than 1 in 100,000 as a proportion of the total population) no bigger than 2.75 m (9.0 ft) tall and 3.5 t (3.9 short tons) in weight.

The African forest elephant has grey skin, which looks yellow to reddish after wallowing. It is sparsely covered with black coarse hair, which is 20–200 mm (0.8–8 in) long around the tip of the tail. The length of the tail varies between individuals from half the height of the rump to almost touching ground. It has five toenails on the fore foot and four on the hind foot. Its back is nearly straight. Its oval-shaped ears have small elliptical-shaped tips, and the tip of the trunk has two finger-like processes.

The African forest elephant's tusks are straight and point downwards, and are present in both males and females. The African forest elephant has pink tusks, which are thinner and harder than the tusks of the African bush elephant. The length and diameter vary between individuals. Tusks of bulls grow throughout life, tusks of cows cease growing when they are sexually mature. The tusks are used to push through the dense undergrowth of their habitat. The largest tusk recorded for the species is 2.41 m (7.9 ft) long and 60 kg (130 lb) in weight. A larger tusk measuring 2.96 m (9.7 ft) long and weighing 70 kg (150 lb) has been recorded, but this may belong to a forest-bush elephant hybrid. The average tusk size is uncertain due to measurements historically being lumped in with those of African bush elephants, but based on the sizes of the largest known tusks may be in the region of 1.6–2 m (5.2–6.6 ft) and 25–30 kg (55–66 lb).

== Distribution and habitat ==
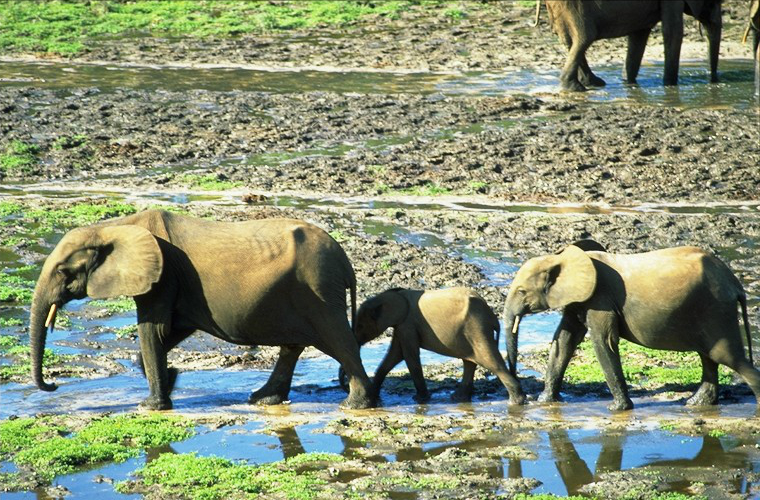
A family of African forest elephants in the Dzanga-Sangha Special Reserve wetlands, Central African Republic

Populations of the African forest elephant in Central Africa range in large contiguous rainforest tracts from Cameroon to the Democratic Republic of the Congo, with the largest stable population in Gabon, where suitable habitat covers 90% of the country.

They are also distributed in the evergreen moist deciduous Upper Guinean forests in Ivory Coast and Ghana, in West Africa.

A group of about 10-25 African forest elephants has been sighted on the escarpment to the east of Luanda in the Kambondo forest in 2015.

Nonetheless, it was estimated that the population of African forest elephants in Central Africa had declined by around 86% (in the 31 years preceding 2021) due to poaching and loss of habitat. In places such as Cameroon, Democratic Republic of the Congo, Republic of the Congo and the Central African Republic, many areas of appropriate forest habitat have been reduced after years of warfare and human conflict. As of 2021, an estimated 95,000 forest elephants lived in Gabon. Prior to this the population had been estimated at 50,000 to 60,000 individuals.

== Behaviour and ecology ==
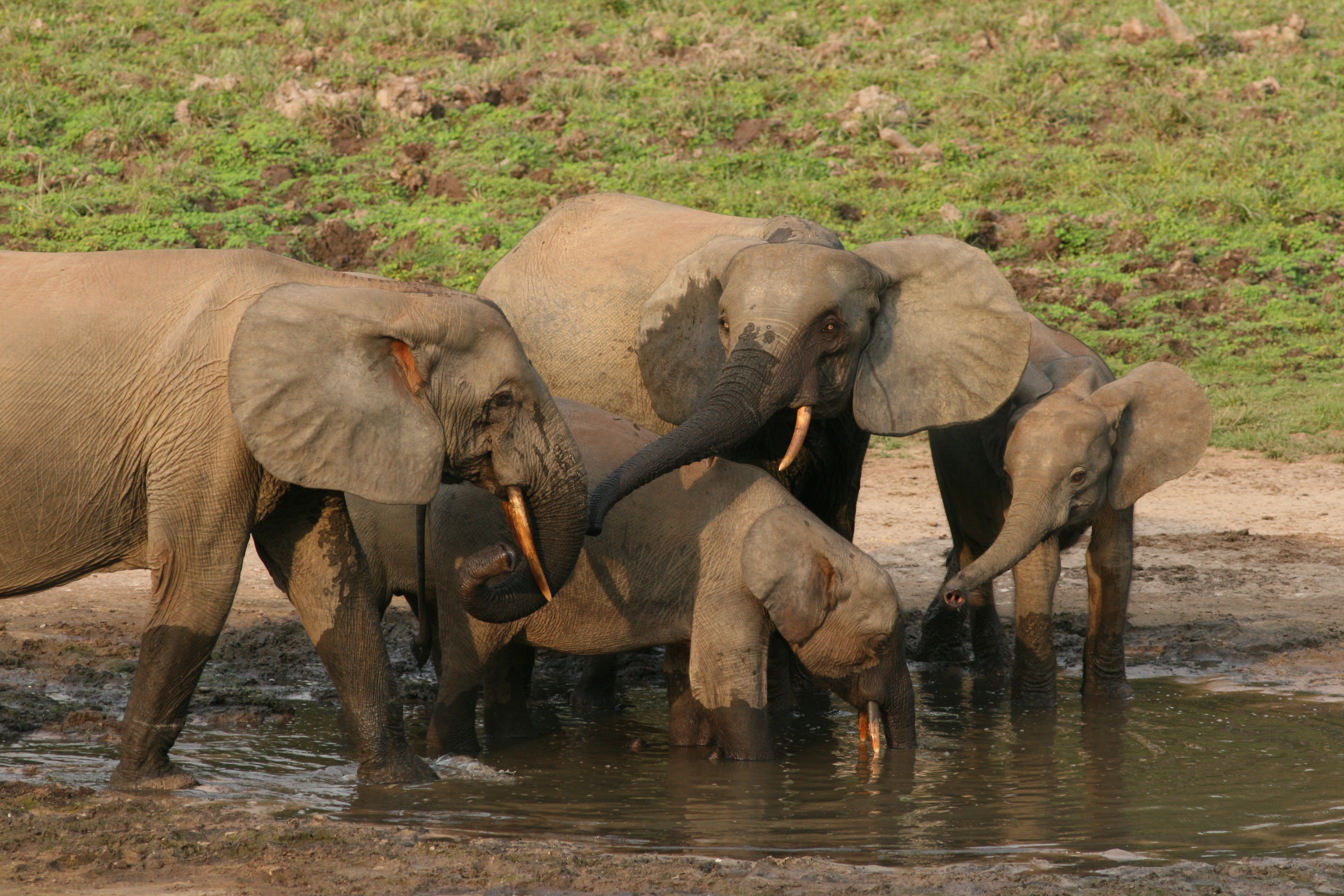
African forest elephants in a waterhole

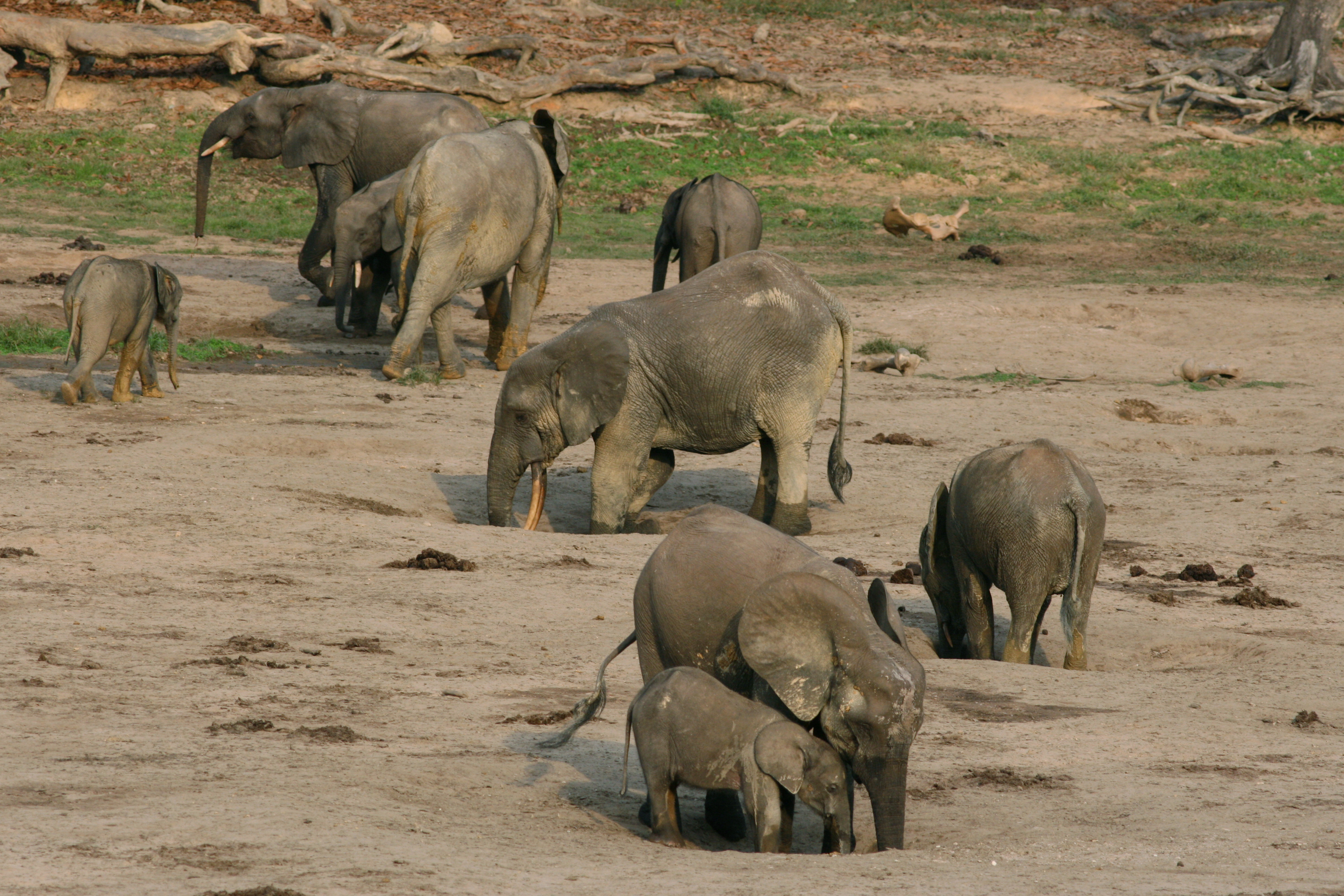
Group of African forest elephants digging at a mineral lick

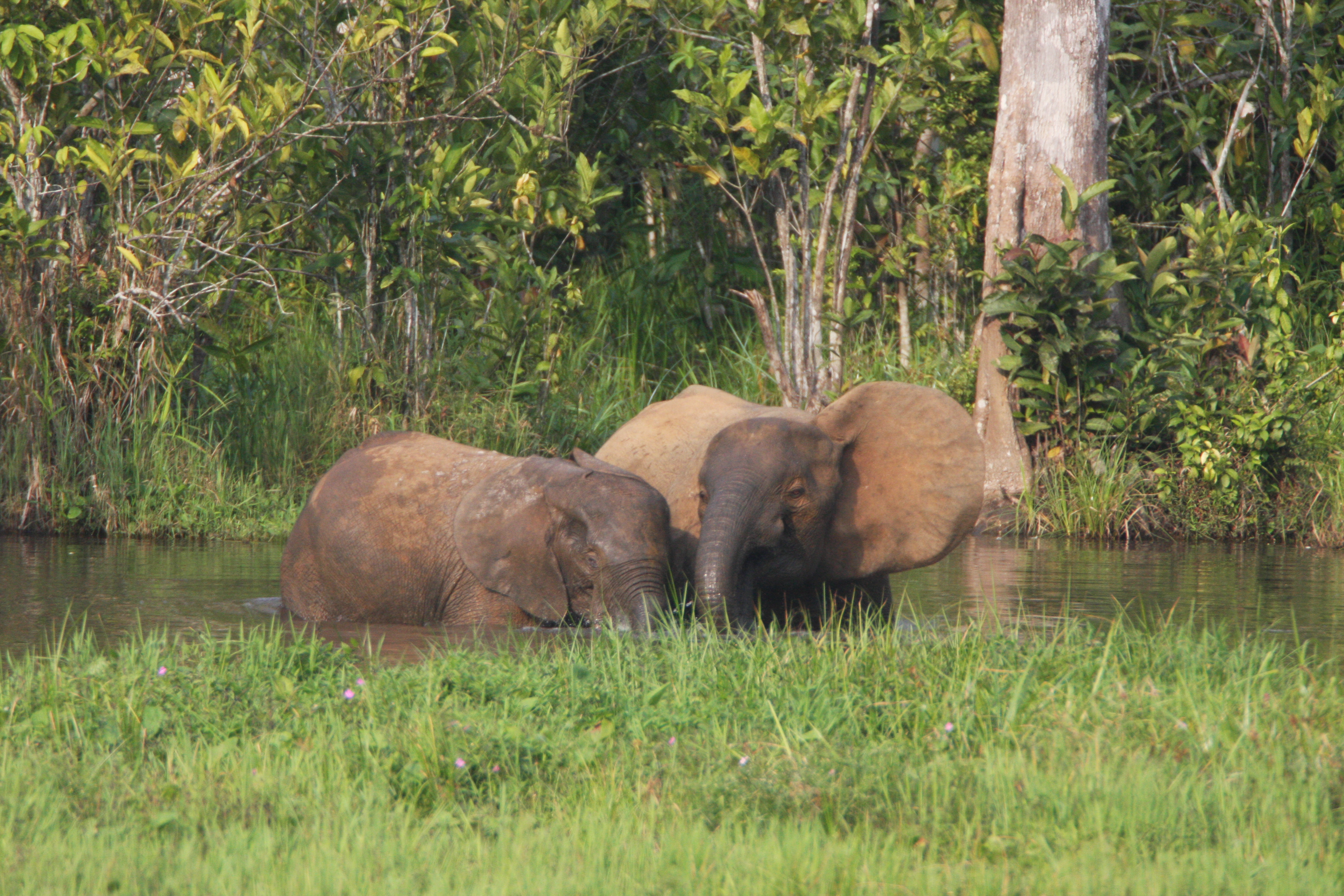
A female with her calf drinking from a spring

The African forest elephant lives in family groups. Groups observed in the rain forest of Gabon's Lopé National Park between 1984 and 1991 comprised between three and eight individuals. Groups of up to 20 individuals were observed in the Dzanga-Sangha Complex of Protected Areas, comprising adult cows, their daughters and subadult sons. Family members look after calves together, called allomothering. Once young bulls reach sexual maturity, they separate from the family group and form loose bachelor groups for a few days, but usually stay alone. Adult bulls associate with family groups only during the mating season. Family groups travel about 7.8 km (4.8 mi) per day and move in a home range of up to 2,000 km^{2} (770 sq mi). Their seasonal movement is related to the availability of ripe fruits in Primary Rainforests. They use a complex network of permanent trails that pass through stands of fruit trees and connect forest clearings with mineral licks. These trails are reused by humans and other animals.

In Odzala-Kokoua National Park, groups were observed to frequently meet at forest clearings indicating a fission–fusion society. They stayed longer when other groups were also present. Smaller groups joined large groups, and bulls joined family units.

=== Diet ===
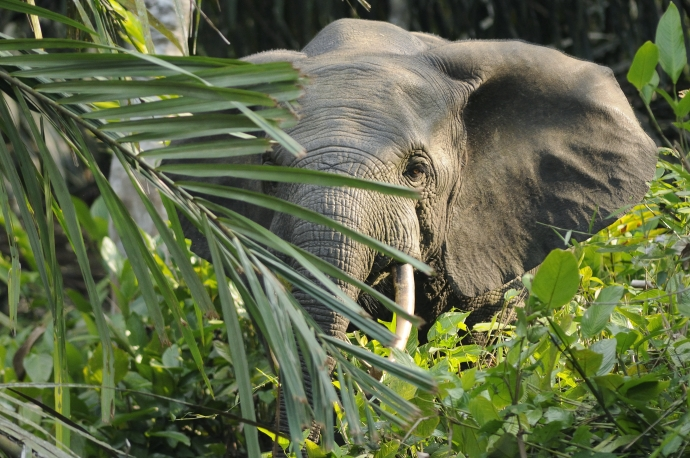
The African forest elephant feeds on bark, leaves, and fruit

The African forest elephant is a herbivore. Elephants observed in Lopé National Park fed mostly tree bark and leaves, and at least 72 different fruits. To supplement their diet with minerals, they congregate at mineral-rich waterholes and mineral licks.

Elephant dung piles collected in Kahuzi-Biéga National Park contained seeds and fruit remains of Omphalocarpum mortehanii, junglesop (Anonidium mannii), Antrocaryon nannanii, Klainedoxa gabonensis, Treculia africana, Tetrapleura tetraptera, Uapaca guineensis, Autranella congolensis, Gambeya africana and G. lacourtiana, Mammea africana, Cissus dinklagei, and Grewia midlbrandii. Dung piles collected in a lowland rain forest in the northern Republic of Congo contained seeds of at least 96 plant species, with a minimum of 30 intact seeds and up to 1102 large seeds of more than 1 cm (0.39 in) in a single pile. Based on the analysis of 855 dung piles, it has been estimated that African forest elephants disperse a daily mean of 346 large seeds per 1 km^{2} (0.39 sq mi) of at least 73 tree species; they transport about a third of the large seeds for more than 5 km (3.1 mi).

Seeds passed by elephant gut germinate faster. The African forest elephant is one of the most effective seed disperser in the tropics and has been referred to as the "megagardener of the forest" due to its significant role in maintaining plant diversity. In the Cuvette Centrale, 14 of 18 megafaunal tree species depend on seed dissemination by African forest elephants, including wild mango (Irvingia gabonensis), Parinari excelsa and Tridesmostemon omphalocarpoides. These 14 species are not able to survive without elephants. African forest elephants provide ecological services that maintain the composition and structure of Central African forests.

=== Communication ===
Vocalization is a trait found among L. cyclotis with studies emphasizing significance in acoustic structure and their social dynamics. Vocalization patterns can be classified into three main types: single rumble, single broadband, and combinatorial. Rumbles are tonal, low-frequency calls, while broadband are calls that lack clear harmonic structures, resembling barks and roars. The utilization of rumbles and broadband calls in combinatorial calls may involve distinct acoustic elements, forming multi-element calls, which combine meaningless elements to generate context-specific meaningful calls. The African forest elephant also exhibits a more balanced distribution of combinatorial call types compared to other elephant species. Despite having a simpler social structure, L. cyclotis can display a comparable repertoire of rumble-roar call combinations than L. africana. Communication patterns vary across age and sex, with adult males typically producing more combinatorial calls than adult females. Additionally, certain events may provoke a behavioral change, as evidenced by lowered levels of vocalizations in response to gunfire sounds related to poaching.

For these mammals, hearing and smell are the most important senses they possess because they do not have good eyesight. They can recognize and hear vibrations through the ground and can detect food sources with their sense of smell. Elephants are also an arrhythmic species, meaning they have the ability to see just as well in dim light as they can in the daylight. They are capable of doing so because the retina in their eyes adjusts nearly as quickly as light does.

=== Reproduction ===
Females reach sexual maturity between the age of 8 and 12 years, depending on the population density and nutrition available. On average, they begin breeding at the age of 23 and give birth every 5–6 years. As a result, the birth rate is lower than the bush species, which starts breeding at age 12 and has a calf every 3–4 years.

Baby elephants weigh around 105 kg (232 lb) at birth. Almost immediately, they can stand up and move around, allowing the mother to roam around and forage, which is also essential to reduce predation. The baby suckles using its mouth while its trunk is held over its head. Their tusks do not come until around 16 months and calves are not weaned until they are roughly 4 or 5 years old. By this time, their tusks are around 14 cm (5.5 in) long and begin to get in the way of suckling.

African forest elephants have a lifespan of about 60 to 70 years and mature slowly, coming to puberty in their early teens. Bulls generally pass puberty within the next year or two of females. Between the ages of 15 and 25, bulls experience "musth", which is a hormonal state they experience marked by increased aggression. The male secretes fluid from the temporal gland between his ear and eye during this time. Younger bulls often experience musth for a shorter period of time, while older bulls do for a longer time. When in musth, bulls have a more erect walk with their head high and tusks inward, they may rub their heads on trees or bushes to spread the musth scent, and they may even flap their ears, accompanied by a musth rumble, so that their smell can be blown toward other elephants. Another behavior affiliated with musth is urination. Bulls allow their urine to slowly come out and spray the insides of their hind legs. All of these behaviors are to advertise to receptive females and competing bulls that they are in the musth state. Bulls only return to the herd to breed or to socialize; they do not provide parental care to their offspring but rather play a fatherly role to younger bulls to show dominance.

Females are polyestrous, meaning they are capable of conceiving multiple times a year, which is a reason why they do not appear to have a breeding season. However, there does appear to be a peak in conceptions during the two rainy seasons of the year. Generally, the female conceives after two or three matings. Though the female has plenty of room in her uterus for twins, twins are rarely conceived. Gestation lasts 22 months. Based on the maturity, fertility, and gestation rates, African forest elephants have the capacity to increase their population by 5% annually under ideal conditions.

== Traditional hunting ==
African forest elephants are hunted by various hunter-gatherer groups in the Congo basin, including by Mbuti pygmies, among others. It is unknown how long the active hunting of elephants in the region has been practised, and it may have only begun as a response for the demand for ivory beginning in the 19th century or earlier.

Elephants are traditionally hunted using spears, typically to stab at the lower abdomen (as is done among the Mbuti) or knees, both of which are effective at rendering the animal immobile. Anthropologist Mitsuo Ichikawa observed the hunting of elephants by Mbuti pygmies in fieldwork during the 1970s and 1980s, when the Mbuti used spears tipped with metal points (though earlier reports suggest that that prior to this they used purely wooden spears, which may have been less effective at breaking the elephants' hide). As observed by Ichikawa, elephant hunting by the Mbuti pygmies involved both small and large groups of hunters, which was led by at least one experienced hunter called a mtuma. Before the hunt began, ritual acts of singing and dancing were performed by the community to support the success of the hunt. These hunters often went into the forest without food, living off of wild honey and vegetables, smearing themselves in mud, elephant dung, and charcoal made from certain plants to disguise their scent from the elephants. Once the traces of an elephant are detected, it was carefully tracked, before being approached from downwind and stabbed. It typically took several hours to several days from the first stab to the death of the elephant.

Many hunts failed due to elephants detecting the hunters before being stabbed and fleeing, with field research by Ichikawa finding that only one out of six Mbuti elephant hunts were successful in a six-month period, corresponding to around 60–70 days of total hunting time, meaning that despite the large quantity of meat provided by each individual elephant, it did not provide reliable subsistence, with the Mbuti instead relying on hunting smaller animals. Following the death of the animal, the Mbuti hunters returned to their homes, with the whole community moving to dismember the elephant carcass. Meat was shared equally among the community with the exception of a few body parts which were reserved for certain community members, with the feast on the animals remains lasting for several days. Elephant hunting was a dangerous activity that was known to result in the deaths of hunters.

== Threats ==
Both African elephant species are threatened foremost by habitat loss and habitat fragmentation following conversion of forests for plantations of non-timber crops, livestock farming, and building urban and industrial areas. As a result, human-elephant conflict has increased. Poaching for ivory and bushmeat is a significant threat in Central Africa. Because of a spike in poaching, the African forest elephant was declared Critically Endangered by the IUCN in 2021 after it was found that the population had decreased by more than 80% over 3 generations.

Civil unrest, human encroachment, and habit fragmentation leaves some elephants confined to small patches of forest without sufficient food. In January 2014, International Fund for Animal Welfare undertook a relocation project at the request of the Ivory Coast government, moving four elephants from Daloa to Assagny National Park.

=== Poaching ===
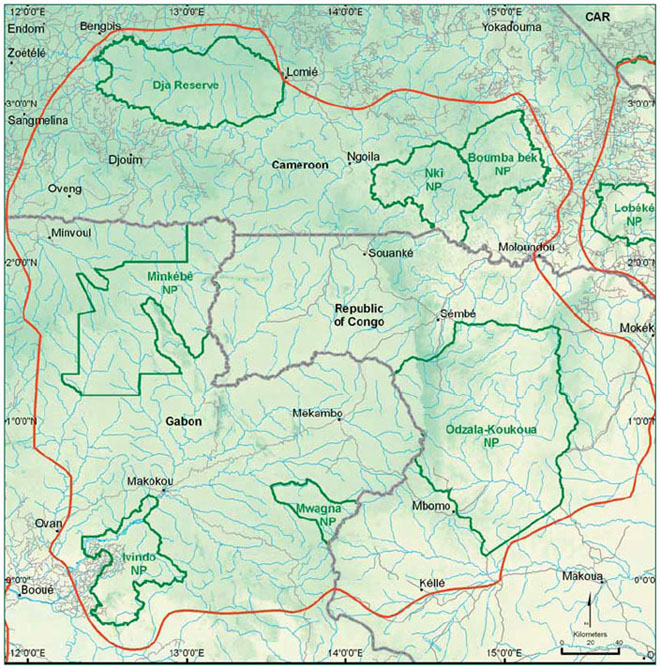
Tridom is a hotspot for poaching of African forest elephants

Genetic analysis of confiscated ivory showed that 328 tusks of African forest elephants seized in the Philippines between 1996 and 2005 originated in the eastern Democratic Republic of the Congo; 2,871 tusks seized in Hong Kong between 2006 and 2013 originated in Tridom, the tri-national Dja-Odzala-Minkébé protected area complex and the adjacent Dzanga Sangha Reserve in the Central African Republic. So did partly worked ivory confiscated between 2013 and 2014 at warehouses in Togo comprising 4,555 kg (5.021 short tons) of tusks. The hard ivory of the African forest elephant makes for more enhanced carving and fetches a higher price on the black market. This preference is evident in Japan, where hard ivory has nearly monopolized the trade for some time. Premium quality bachi, a traditional Japanese plucking tool used for string instruments, is contrived exclusively from African forest elephant tusks. In the impenetrable and often trackless expanses of the rain forests of the Congo Basin, poaching is extremely difficult to detect and track. Levels of off-take, for the most part, are estimated from ivory seizures. The scarcely populated and unprotected forests in Central Africa are most likely becoming increasingly alluring to organized poacher gangs.

Late in the 20th century, conservation workers established a DNA identification system to trace the origin of poached ivory. Due to poaching to meet high demand for ivory, the African forest elephant population approached critical levels in the 1990s and early 2000s. Over several decades, numbers are estimated to have fallen from approximately 700,000 to less than 100,000, with about half of the remaining population in Gabon. In May 2013, Sudanese poachers killed 26 elephants in the Central African Republic's Dzanga Bai World Heritage Site. Communications equipment, video cameras, and additional training of park guards were provided following the massacre to improve protection of the site. From mid-April to mid-June 2014, poachers killed 68 elephants in Garamba National Park, including young ones without tusks.

At the request of President Ali Bongo Ondimba, twelve British soldiers traveled to Gabon in 2015 to assist in training park rangers following the poaching of many elephants in Minkebe National Park.

On 19 August 2020, Guyvanho, a poacher who killed over 500 African forest elephants in the Nouabalé-Ndoki National Park, was convicted to 30 years in prison for charges of poaching and others. Guyvanho was the first poacher to be tried criminally in the Republic of the Congo, and has the longest prison sentence for a poacher in the Republic of the Congo.

=== Bushmeat trade ===
It is not ivory alone that drives African forest elephant poaching. Killing for bushmeat in Central Africa has evolved into an international business in recent decades with markets reaching New York and other major cities of the United States, and the industry is still on the rise. This illegal market poses the greatest threat not only to forest elephants where hunters can target elephants of all ages, including calves, but to all of the larger species in the forests. There are actions that can be taken to lower the incentive for supplying to the bushmeat market. Regional markets, and international trade, require the transporting of extensive amounts of animal meat which, in turn, requires the utilisation of vehicles. Having checkpoints on major roads and railroads can potentially help disrupt commercial networks. In 2006, it was estimated that 410 African forest elephants are killed yearly in the Cross-Sanaga-Bioko coastal forests.

== Conservation ==
In 1986, the African Elephant Database was initiated with the aim to monitor the status of African elephant populations. This database includes results from aerial surveys, dung counts, interviews with local people, and data on poaching.

Both African elephant species have been listed by the Convention on International Trade in Endangered Species of Wild Fauna and Flora on CITES Appendix I since 1989. This listing banned commercial international trade of wild African elephants and their parts and derivatives by countries that signed the CITES agreement. Populations of Botswana, Namibia and Zimbabwe were listed in CITES Appendix II in 1997 as was the population of South Africa in 2000. Hunting elephants is banned in the Central African Republic, Democratic Republic of Congo, Gabon, Côte d'Ivoire, and Senegal.

African forest elephants are estimated to constitute up to one-third of the continent's elephant population but have been poorly studied because of the difficulty in observing them through the dense vegetation that makes up their habitat. Thermal imaging has facilitated observation of the species, leading to more information on their ecology, numbers, and behavior, including their interactions with elephants and other species. Scientists have learned more about how the elephants, who have poor night vision, negotiate their environment using only their hearing and olfactory senses. They also appeared to be much more active sexually during the night compared to the day, which was unexpected.

Research in the tropical rainforest has shown that African forest elephants can significantly increase the forest's carbon uptake, making conservation a way to contribute to carbon storage.
