= African mahogany =

African mahogany is a marketing name for several African trees whose wood has properties similar to New World mahogany species.

- genus Entandrophragma of the family Meliaceae
- genus Khaya of the family Meliaceae
- genus Afzelia of the family Fabaceae (legumes)
