= Guyvanho =

Congolese convicted ivory trader and poacher (born c. 1985)

- Born: Mobanza Mobembo Gérard; 1985 (38–39 years old); Democratic Republic of the Congo
- Other name: Butcher of Nouabalé Ndoki
- Citizenship: Democratic Republic of the Congo; Republic of the Congo
- Occupations: Poacher; Ivory trader
- Years active: 2008–2020
- Known for: Longest prison sentence for a poacher in the Republic of the Congo
- Criminal charges: Attempted murder Ivory trading Poaching; Possession of military weapons
- Criminal penalty: 30 years
- Criminal status: Incarcerated

Mobanza Mobembo Gérard (born c. 1985), known as Guyvanho, nicknamed the Butcher of Nouabalé Ndoki, is a Congolese convicted ivory trafficker and poacher. He was sentenced to thirty years in prison for poaching and attempted murder of park rangers, the first criminal sentence and the longest sentence a poacher received in the Republic of the Congo.

== Poaching ==
Gérard was born around 1985 in the Democratic Republic of the Congo, then moved to the Republic of the Congo in 2008. He began poaching elephants that year in the Nouabalé-Ndoki National Park, the namesake for the nickname "Butcher of Nouablé Ndoki". He led a group of about 25 poachers, and they poached at least 500 African forest elephants. Gérard's group were connected to an incident in early 2018, where they were caught with 11 poached elephants. Gérard got away, but three members of his group were arrested, and Gérard had an arrest warrant issued on him. Gérard's group were also connected to an incident on May 31, 2019, where they shot at park rangers and injured two of them.

== Prosecutions ==
Gérard was arrested in May 2018 and was sent jail in Ouésso to await trial. On June 2, twelve days before his trial, he escaped from jail, later being given trial in absentia. He was charged five million Central African CFA franc in damages and was sentenced to five years in prison.

Gérard was arrested again on July 20, 2019, and was sent back to jail in Ouésso. He attempted to escape, but failed. He was then transferred to jail in Brazzaville.

On August 19, 2020, after a 3-year long investigation, Gérard received a 30-year prison sentence on charges of attempted murder, ivory trading, poaching and possession of military weapons. He was also required to pay 38 million CFA franc to the rangers he injured. He was the first poacher tried criminally in the Republic of the Congo, as other poachers were tried in civil court, which has maximum sentencing of five years. He also received the longest sentence for a poacher in the Republic of the Congo.
