= Wildlife of Cameroon =

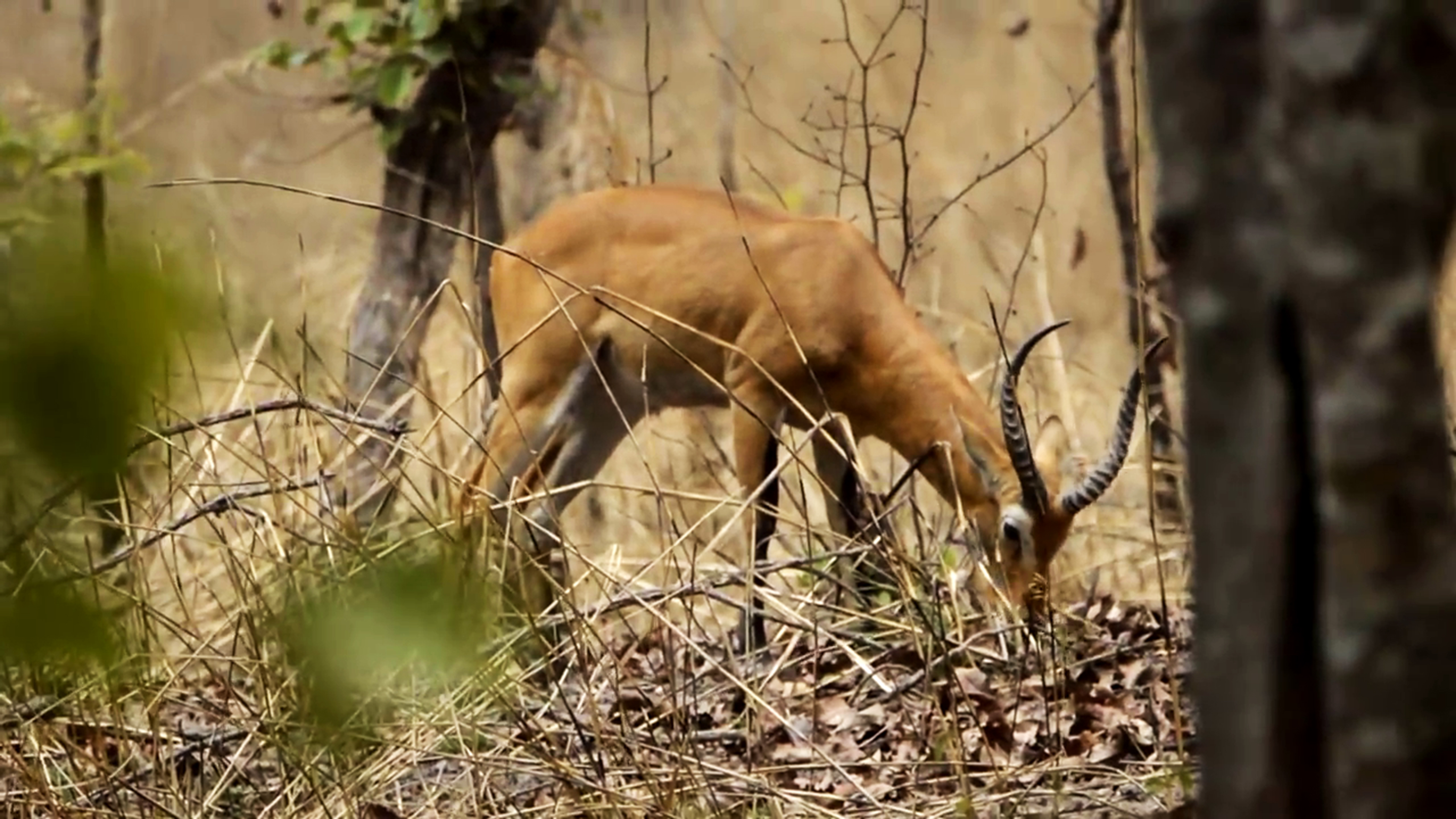
Kob (Kobus kob) in Bénoué National Park.

The wildlife of Cameroon is composed of its flora and fauna. Bordering Nigeria, it is considered one of the wettest parts of Africa and records Africa's second highest concentration of biodiversity. To preserve its wildlife, Cameroon has more than 20 protected reserves comprising national parks, zoos, forest reserves and sanctuaries. The protected areas were first created in the northern region under the colonial administration in 1932; the first two reserves established were Mozogo Gokoro Reserve and the Bénoué Reserve, which was followed by the Waza Reserve on 24 March 1934. The coverage of reserves was initially about 4 percent of the country's area, rising to 12 percent; the administration proposes to cover 30 percent of the land area.

The rich wildlife consists of 8,260 recorded plant species including 156 endemic species, 409 species of mammals of which 14 are endemic, 690 species of birds which includes 8 endemic species, 250 species of reptiles, and 200 species of amphibians. The habitats of these species include the southern region comprising tropical lowland, coastline on the Gulf of Guinea. Mangrove forests, 270,000 hectares (670,000 acres) in size, are along the coast line. Montane forests and savannas are in the northern region of the country. Important protected areas for these species are the Mbam Djerem National Park, Benoue National Park, Korup National Park, Takamanda National Park, and the Kagwene Gorilla Sanctuary. Cameroon is an important breeding area for marine and freshwater species such as crustaceans, mollusks, fish, and birds.

== Geography ==
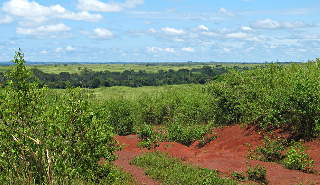
Equatorial savanna in the East Province of Cameroon

The topography of the country extends from the coastline to hill regions with elevations of up to 2,000 meters (6,600 ft). The habitat consists of three regions. These are: The dense rainforests in the southern region in the hot and humid climatic conditions; the central region of semi-deciduous forests; and the northern region consisting of semi-deciduous forests of wooded savanna with scattered trees. The climatic conditions are of low to highland with equatorial to tropical climate. Initial coverage of protected areas was in savanna region but it now covers all the ten provinces of the country with all the diversity of its topographic, climatic, hydrological biological features.

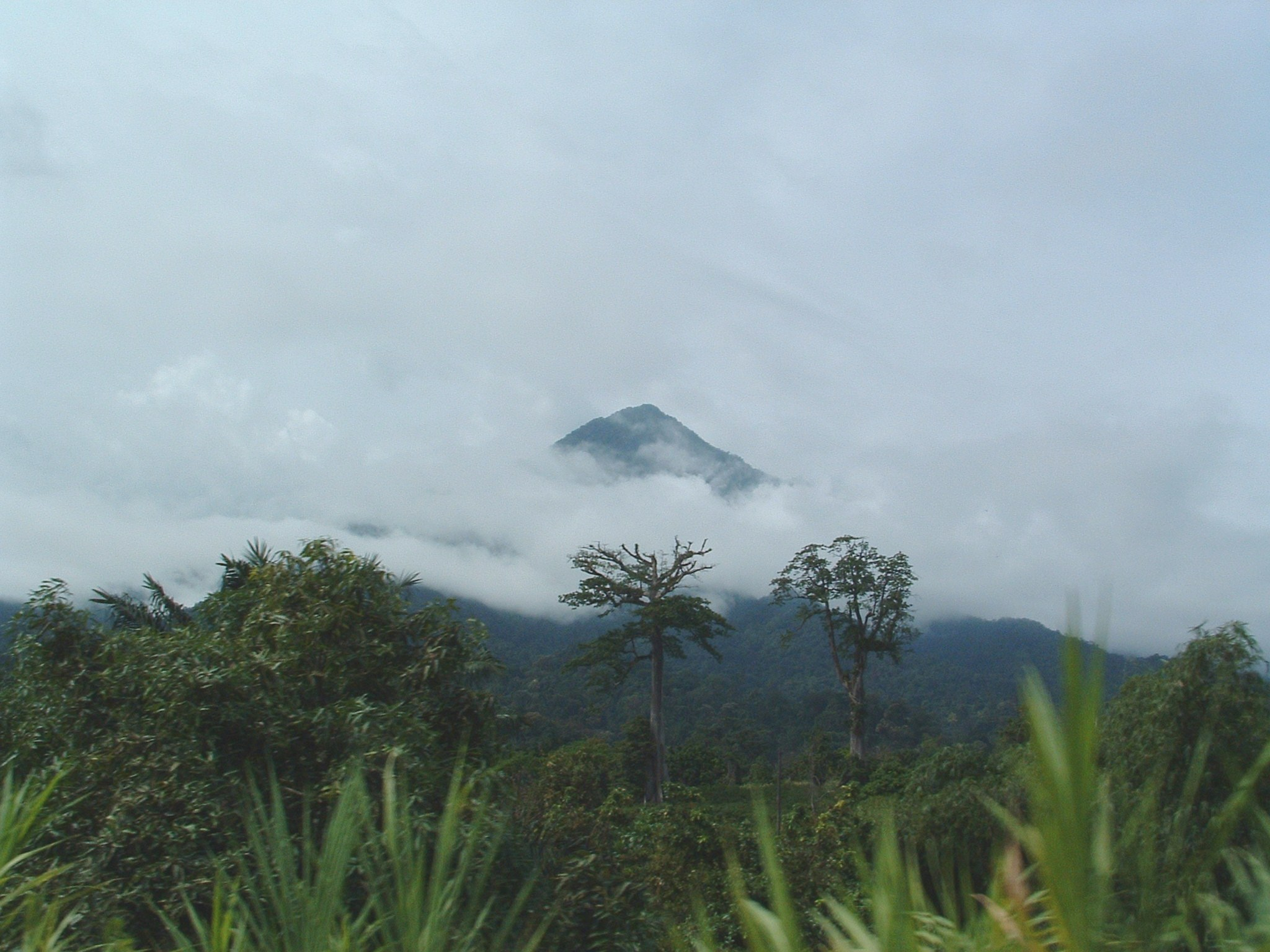
Mount Cameroon

The highest mountain in the country is the Mount Cameroon with an elevation of 4,070 meters (13,350 ft). It is located in southwestern Cameroon in the coastal zone close to the Nigerian border.

The total forest area coverage is reported to be 238,623 hectares (589,650 acres) of which 171,090 hectares (422,800 acres) of closed forest and 65,000 hectares (160,000 acres) is fragmented forest or degraded forests accounting for 27 percent of the total forest area. The forests are also categorized as part of the "Congolian Coastal Forests, Western Congo Basin Forests, Sudanian Savannas, Sahelian Flooded Savannas, Gulf of Guinea Rivers and Crater Lakes, Guinean-Congolian Coast Mangroves, and Gulf of Guinea Marine Ecosystems." One of the important regions is the Cameroonian Highlands forests which extends across the Cameroon Highlands, covering an area of 38,000 square kilometers (15,000 sq mi) in western Cameroon and eastern Nigeria. The ecoregion lies above 900 metres (3,000 ft) elevation, and is surrounded at lower elevations by the Cross-Sanaga-Bioko coastal forests at the southern end of the range, and by forest-savanna mosaic along the central and northern ends of the range; the Cameroon Highlands form the boundary between the Guinean and Northern Congolian forest-savanna mosaic ecoregions, consisting of sub-montane to montane forests and finally sub alpine grasslands. The region is categorized as critical/endangered, but the area under full protection is not great. The area is subject to intense population pressure and conversion of forest lands into agricultural areas.

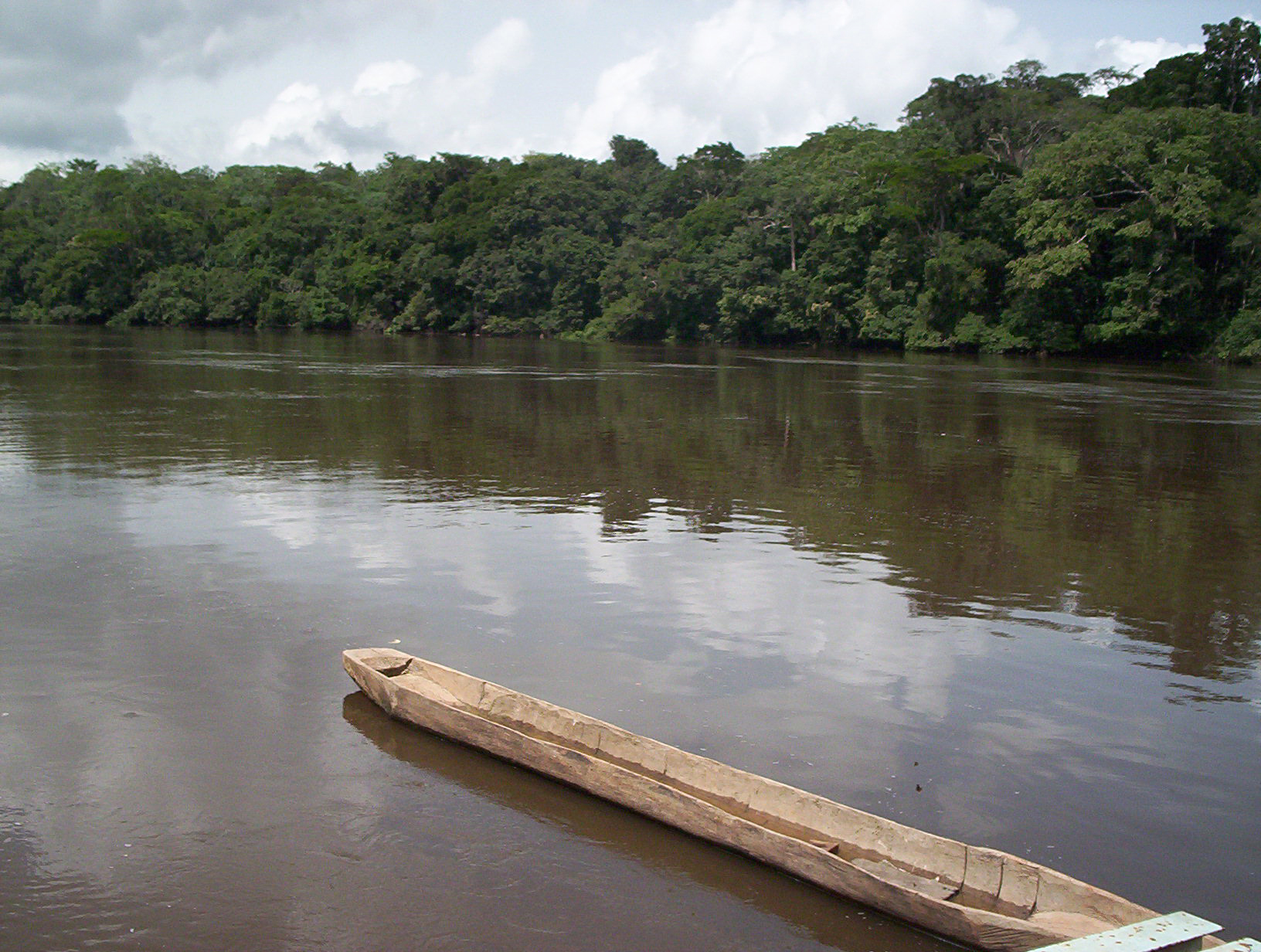
The Dja River which has the Dja Faunal Reserve joins the Sangha River.

As part of the Congo Basin, the Sangha River, drained by the tributaries rising in the northern humid region, and flowing into the southern region of the country, is the main water catchment. At the swampy estuary it forms several branches, and is also joined by the Likouala-aux-Herbes, Likouala-Mossaka, and Ubangi (Oubangui) rivers. Another major river, which joins the Sangha River, is the Dja River, which rises in west-central Africa and flows forming the border between Cameroon and the Republic of the Congo, and through the Dja Faunal Reserve, a UNESCO World Heritage Site. The major river drainage is the Chari subbasin of the Congo Basin, which covers Cameroon and the Central African Republic. It drains into the Atlantic Ocean.

== Protected areas ==
Many protected areas are still in "pristine" condition, mostly because there is less tourism in Cameroon than other regions of Africa. According to reported statistics, there were ten protected areas from 1932 to 1960. Six protected areas were added between 1960 and 1980, five more were added between 1980 and 2004, and eight protected areas are under consideration within a final approval process.

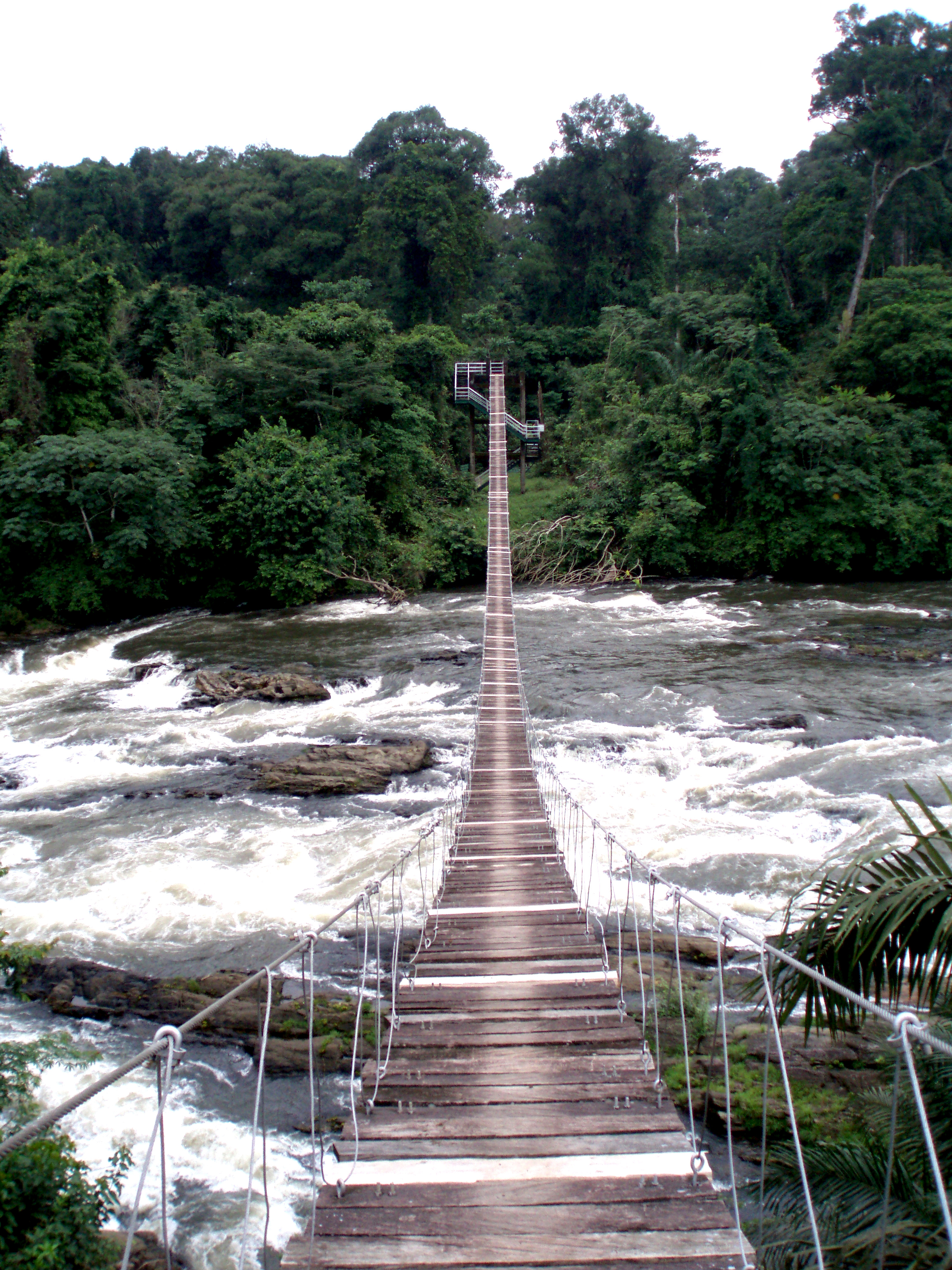
Korup became a national park in 1982.

The protected areas cover 28,104 square kilometres (10,851 sq mi) of which 22,784 square kilometres (8,797 sq mi) (81 percent) is part of the border protected area. The distribution of this protected area within Cameroon covers: The Lowland forest zones of Dja (5,260 square kilometres (2,030 sq mi)) with corridors connecting to the Nki and Minkébé protected areas, the Nki National Park covering 1,950 square kilometres (750 sq mi) with ecological corridors to Dja and Boumba–Bek, the Boumba Bek National Park covering 2,330 square kilometres (900 sq mi), and the Lobéké National Park covering 2,100 square kilometres (810 sq mi) (integrated with the Trinational Park of Cameroon, the Central African Republic, and the Republic of Congo and linked with an Eco-corridor to Boumba–Bek Reserve; the Campo Ma'an National Park of 3,000 square kilometres (1,200 sq mi), which borders with the Rio de Campo of Equatorial Guinea; and the Savanna Zone comprising the Waza National Park of 1,700 square kilometres (660 sq mi) near Chad border, Faro National Park of 3,300 square kilometres (1,300 sq mi) area with common boundary with Nigeria, and the Kalamaloué National Park of 45 square kilometres (17 sq mi) on the Chad border.

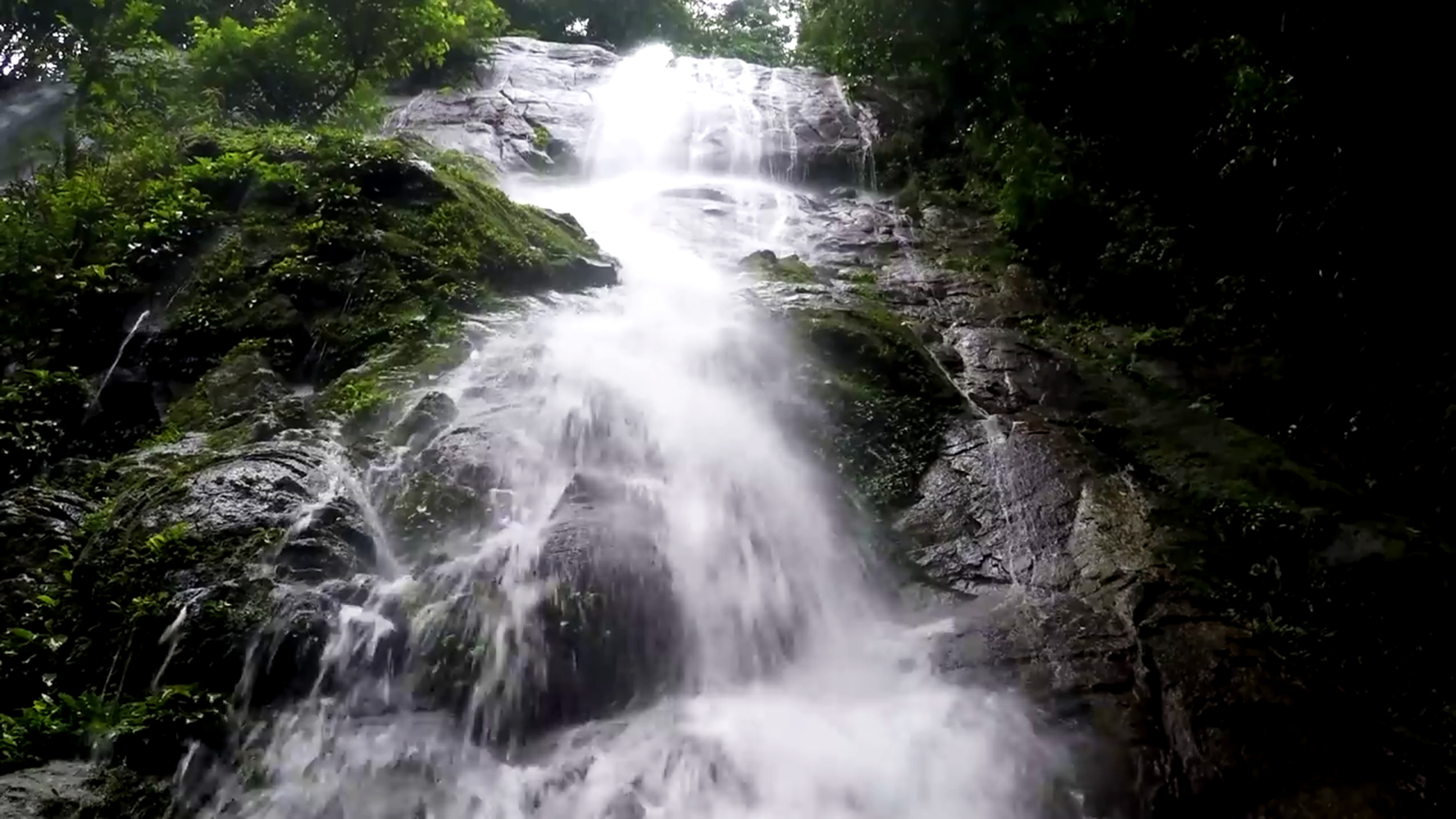
Falling waters in Korup National Park

Cameroon's first protected area in the northern part of the country was established in 1932 under the French colonial administration of the black francophone Africa. The first forest reserve created was the Mozogo Gokoro Reserve 12 June 1932 and the second in the same year was the Benue Reserve on 19 November 1932. The third reserve, the Waza Reserve was established on 24 March 1934, initially covering an area of 155,000 hectares (380,000 acres) which was extended in 1935 to cover 165,000 hectares (410,000 acres); this is one of the most popular reserves in the country. Until 1975, there were 9 protected areas with greater focus on the north than the south. Following the Earth Summit of Rio de Janeiro in Brazil in 1992, the number of protected areas increased substantially and were well distributed covering all the ten provinces of the country in widely differing topographic, climatic, hydrological and biological conditions. There are 20 protected reserves which include national parks, zoos, forest reserves and sanctuaries.

== Flora ==
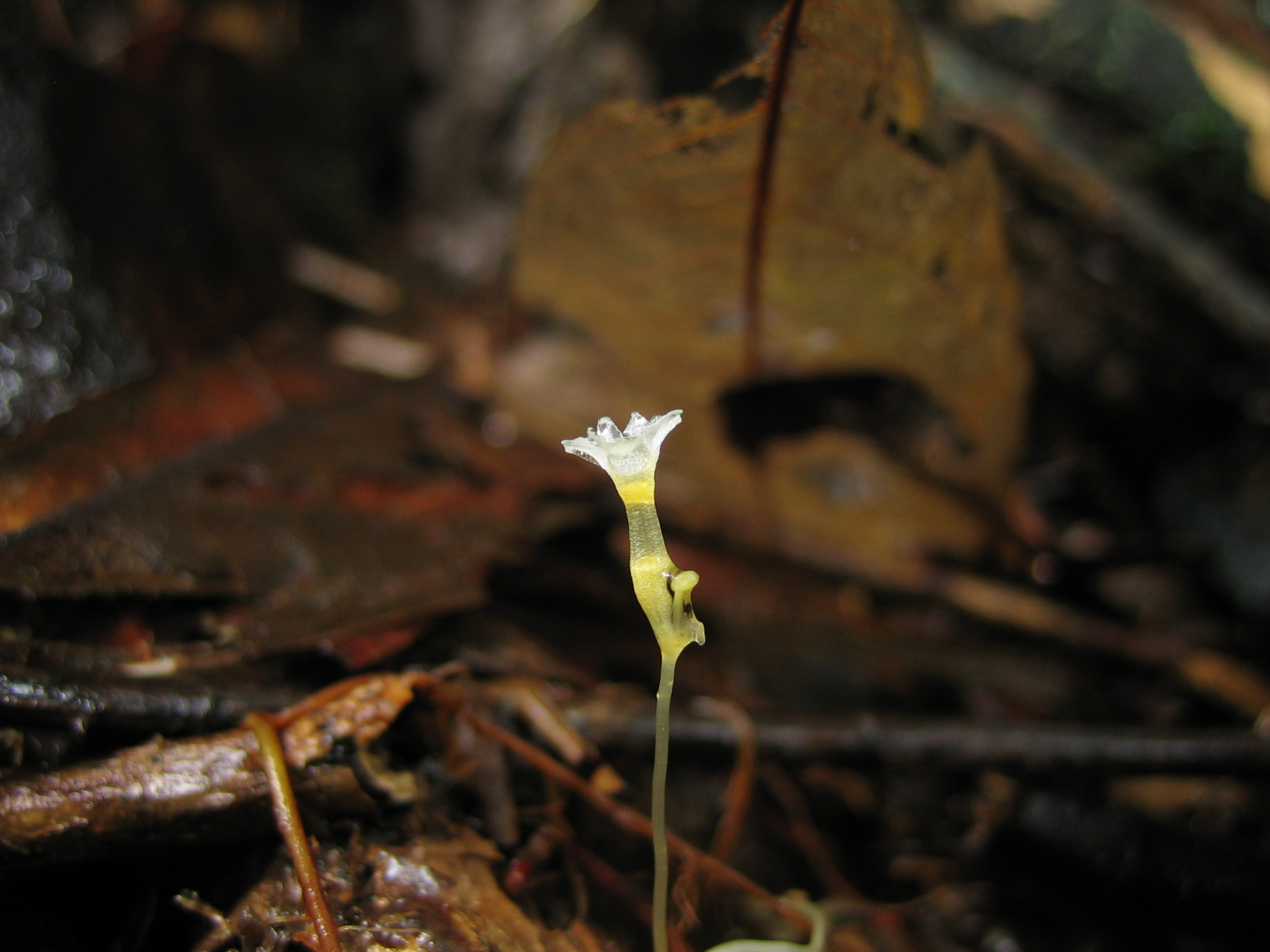
Gymnosiphon bekensis

The vegetation varies with elevation. Submontane forests extend from 900 to 1,800 meters (3,000 to 5,900 ft) elevation. Above 1,800 meters (5,900 feet) elevation are distinct montane forests and patches of montane grassland, bamboo forest, and subalpine grasslands and shrub lands. The ecoregion is characterized by the presence of afromontane species, which have an archipelago-like distribution across the highlands of Africa. Typical afromontane species are Nuxia congesta, Podocarpus milanjianus, Prunus africana, Rapanea melanophloeos, and Syzygium guineense bamendae.

In Cameroon forest cover is around 43% of the total land area, equivalent to 20,340,480 ha (50,262,400 acres) of forest in 2020, down from 22,500,000 ha (56,000,000 acres) in 1990. In 2020, naturally regenerating forest covered 20,279,380 ha (50,111,400 acres) and planted forest covered 61,100 ha (151,000 acres). Around 15% of the forest area was found within protected areas, for the year 2015, 100% of the forest area was reported to be under public ownership.

The evergreen trees found in the rainforests are mahogany, ebony, obeche, dibetu, and sapelli; the trees grow to heights of 200 feet. The trees are also covered with mosses, lichens, and other epiphytes. In the drier woodlands above the rain forests are the tall grasslands and also some areas covered with mountain bamboo. In elevations between 2,400 m and 3,000 m, short grasses are the dominant species, particularly in the region of Mount Cameroon.

== Fauna ==
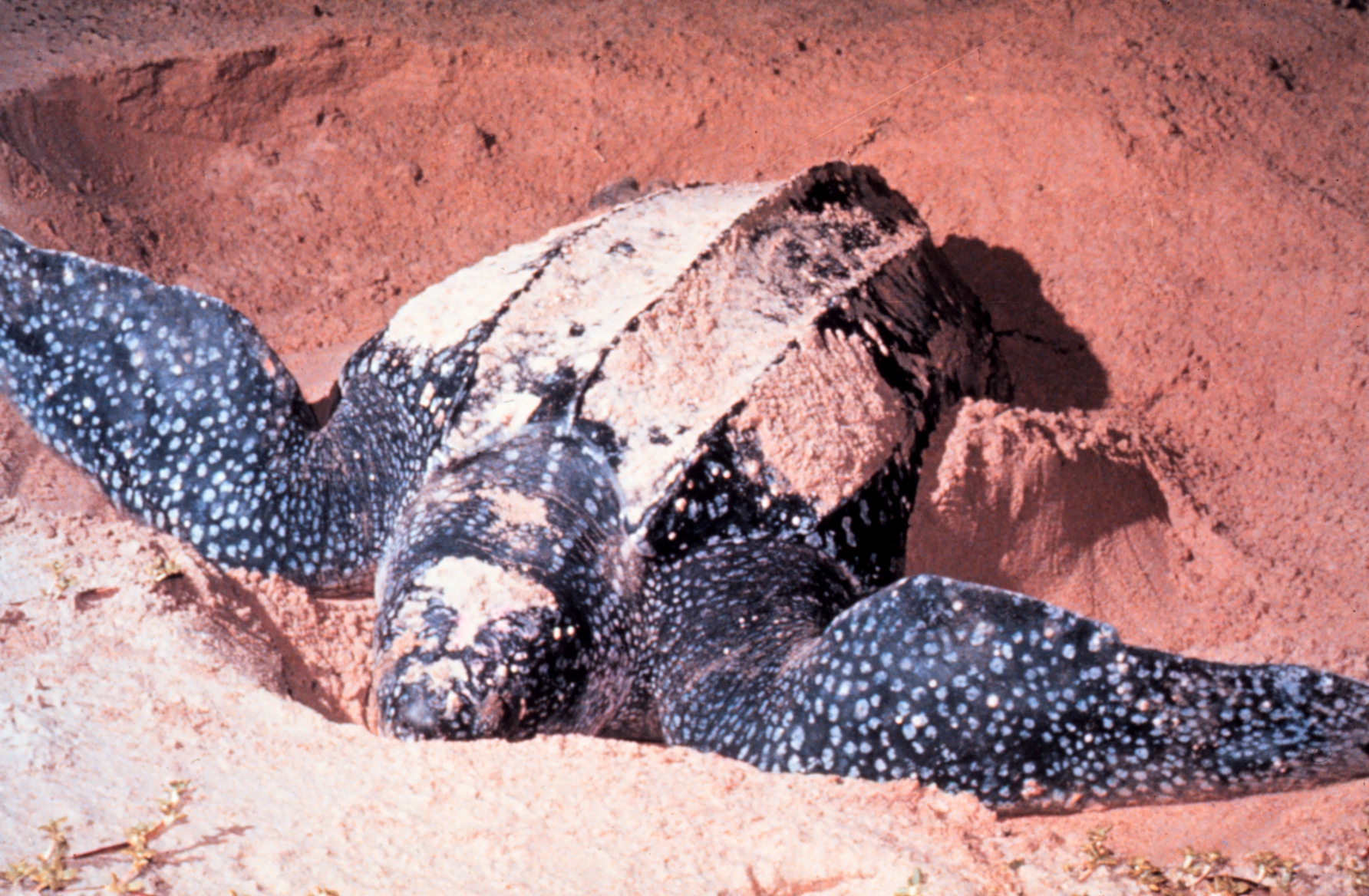
Leatherback turtle

The most endangered species is the Cross River gorilla, a great ape, whose last reported count was 300, spread over 11 scattered sites both in Cameroon and Nigeria. For preservation of this species of ape, the Kagwene Gorilla Sanctuary and the Takamanda National Park have been specifically established in Cameroon. Elephants migrate between the Lake Chad region in Chad and Cameroon; 300 to 400 elephants are reported to live here. In the dense forest areas of the rainforest ecoregion the fauna commonly reported are; red and green monkeys, chimpanzees, mandrills, rodents, bats, and large number of birds like the small sunbirds, giant hawks and eagles. Elephants are also reported in small numbers. The grassy woodlands have baboons and many species of antelope.

Reptiles

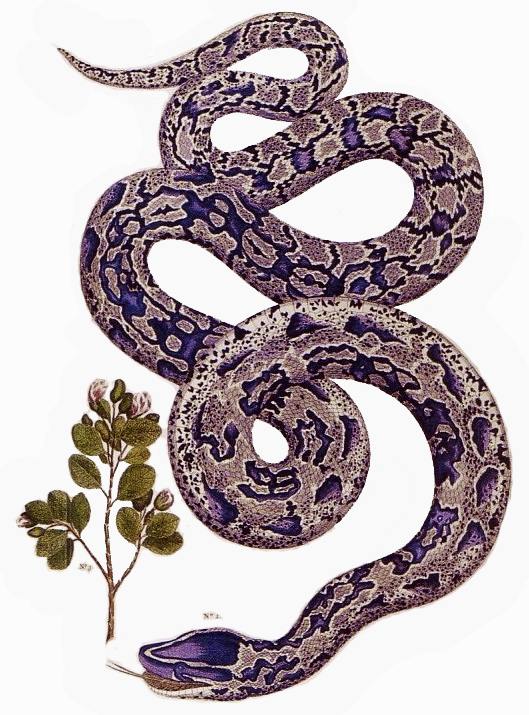
Python sebae

Prominent reptiles reported include the African rock python (Python sebae), the green bush viper (Atheris squamigera) and the African slender-snouted crocodile (Mecistops cataphractus). Marine turtles reported near the coasts of Cameroon in the Atlantic Ocean are the loggerhead (Caretta caretta), Atlantic green (Chelonias mydas), leatherback (Dermochelys coriacea), hawksbill (Eretmochelys imbricata), and the olive ridley (Lepidochelys olivacea). Cameroon has enacted legislation to protect all these species of turtles. Olive ridley, leatherback, and green turtles are reported to nest on the sandy shoreline between Equatorial Guinea and the Wouri Estuary in Cameroon during November to January.

Mammals

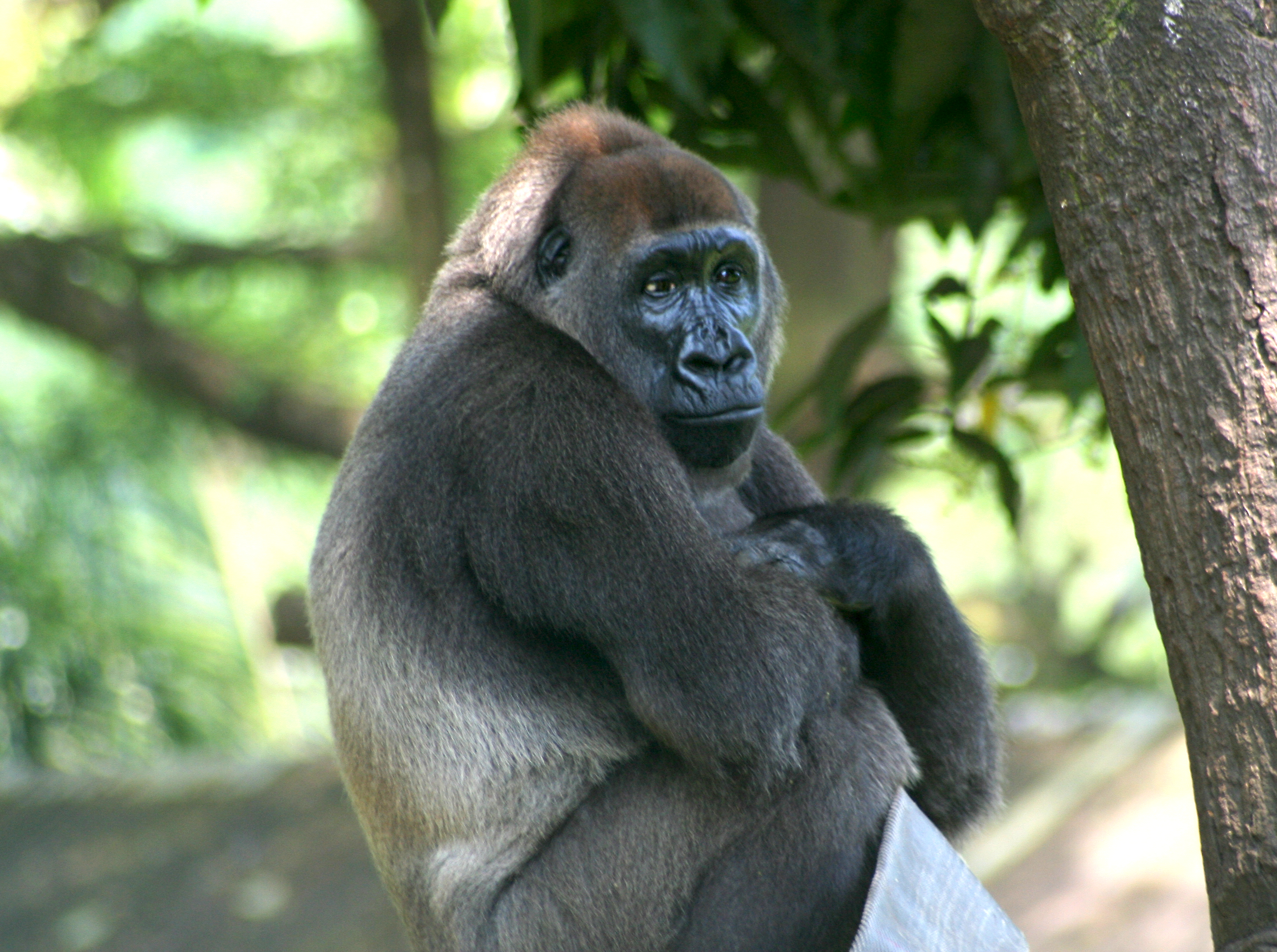
Cross River gorilla

Primates reported are: De Brazza's monkey (Cercopithecus neglectus), the black colobus (Colobus satanas); the patas monkey (Erythrocebus patas); the western gorilla (Gorilla gorilla); the Angolan colobus (Colobus angolensis); the moustached monkey (Cercopithecus cephus); the Gabon bushbaby (Galago gabonensis); the mona monkey (Cercopithecus mona); and the western needle-clawed galago (Euoticus elegantulus). The Cross River gorilla is the most endangered African ape subspecies.

Eleven small mammal species are endemic to the ecoregion: Eisentraut's striped mouse (Hybomys eisentrauti), the African wood mouse (Hylomyscus grandis), the Mount Oku rat (Lamottemys okuensis), Mittendorf's striped grass mouse (Lemniscomys mittendorfi), two brush-furred mouse species (Lophuromys dieterleni) and (Lophuromys eisentrauti), the Oku mouse shrew (Myosorex okuensis), the Rumpi mouse shrew (M. rumpii), the western vlei rat (Otomys occidentalis), Hartwig's soft-furred mouse (Praomys hartwigi), and Isabella's shrew (Sylvisorex isabellae).

Other small mammals present include Stuhlmann's golden mole (Chrysochloris stuhlmanni); the long-tailed pangolin (Manis tetradactyla) and the African clawless otter (Aonyx capensis). Rodents include the lesser cane rat (Thryonomys gregorianus); Dendromurinae (African climbing mice, fat mice, tree mice, and relatives), and Otomyinae (vlei rats and whistling rats). Bats include the lesser woolly bat (Kerivoula lanosa) and Franquet's epauletted bat (Epomops franqueti).

In Cameroon, a range of cetacean species such as humpback whale, right whale, sperm whale, fin whale, sei whale, killer whale, and dolphins are reported on the coast of the Atlantic Ocean. The African manatee (Trichechus senegalensis) is also present.

The Central African cheetah (Acinonyx jubatus soemmeringii) and West African wild dog (Lycaon pictus manguensis) were declared extinct from Cameroon in 2010.

Avifauna

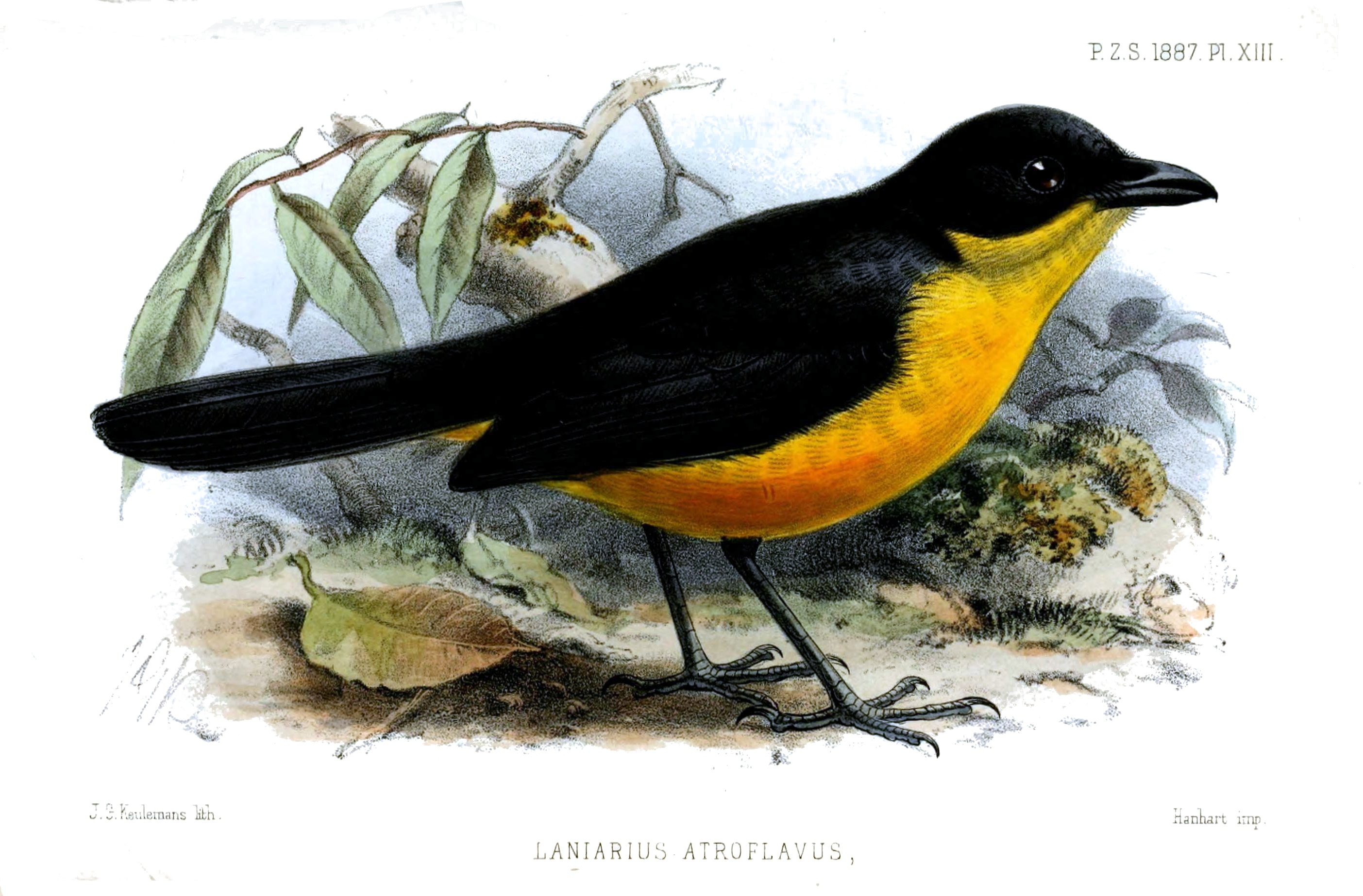
Laniarius atroflavus

Cameroon has more than 900 bird species which belong to 76 families. Of these 7 are endemic and 20 are specialty species. With this rich reporting of birds, they are categorized as resident birds (found throughout the year), breeding birds (which breed during the season), and migrants birds found only during specific the seasons and wintering birds which resided here during winter away from the colder regions of the north.

Though the ecoregion is rich in bird species, birdwatching is a very limited activity here. The nearby Mount Cameroon and Bioko montane forests ecoregion is also known for the endemic species. The seven endemic species are: the Bamenda apalis (Apalis bamendae), Bangwa forest warbler (Bradypterus bangwaensis), white-throated mountain-babbler (Kupeornis gilberti), banded wattle-eye (Platysteira laticincta), Bannerman's weaver (Ploceus bannermani), Bannerman's turaco (Tauraco bannermani), and Mt. Kupe bushshrike (Telophorus kupeensis). Fourteen species are endemic to the Cameroon Highlands forests and Mt. Cameroon: Andropadus montanus, Phyllastrephus poliocephalus, Laniarius atroflavus, Malaconotus gladiator, Cossypha isabellae and the subspecies Cisticola chubbi discolor (sometimes considered a separate species C. discolor). Nine more montane endemic species are shared with Mt. Cameroon and Bioko: Psalidoprocne fuliginosa, Andropadus tephrolaemus, Phyllastrephus poensis, Phylloscopus herberti, Urolais epichlora, Poliolais lopezi, Nectarinia oritis, Nectarinia ursulae and Nesocharis shelleyi.

Molluscs

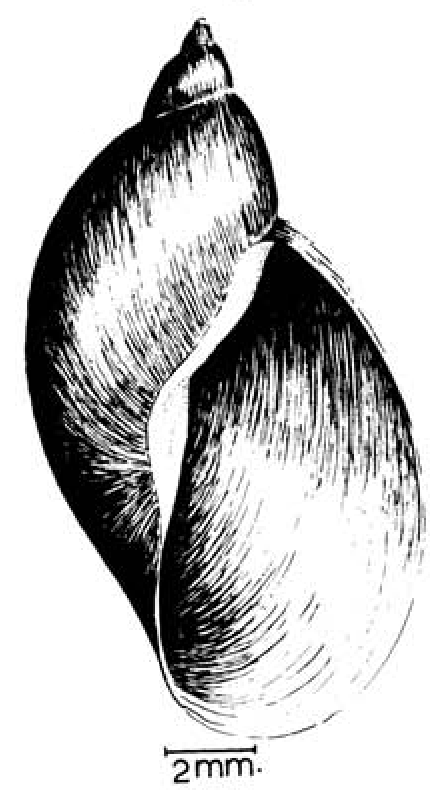
Radix natalensis shell

Some of the non-marine molluscs species found in the wild in Cameroon are: Bulinus camerunensis, an endangered species found in western Cameroon from Barombi Koto and Debundsha, both crater lakes; Lymnaea natalensis, a species of least concern; and Sinistrexcisa, a new genus of land snail with four new species.

== Endangered species ==
The ecoregion is home to several critically endangered, endangered and vulnerable species of animals. These are the following.

- The critically endangered species are: Eisentraut's shrew (Crocidura eisentrauti) also endemic, pitch shrew (Crocidura picea) also endemic, and Rumpi mouse shrew (Myosorex rumpii) also endemic. Gabon dwarf shrew (Suncus remyi) which was earlier rated by IUCN in 2004 as critically endangered is now rated as of least concern.
- The endangered species are: arrogant shrew (Sylvisorex morio) also endemic, chimpanzee (Pan troglodytes), crested genet (Genetta cristata), drill (Mandrillus leucophaeus), Eisentraut's mouse shrew (Myosorex eisentrauti). Eisentraut's striped mouse (Hybomys eisentrauti) also endemic, giant African water shrew (Potamogale velox), gorilla (Gorilla gorilla), Hartwig's soft-furred mouse (Praomys hartwigi), Mittendorf's striped grass mouse (Lemniscomys mittendorfi) also endemic, Mt. Oku rat (Lamottemys okuensis) also endemic, Preuss's monkey (or Preuss's guenon) (Cercopithecus preussi), western vlei rat (Otomys occidentalis), wild dog (Lycaon pictus), and Wimmer's shrew (Crocidura wimmeri).
- The vulnerable species are: African elephant (Loxodonta africana), African golden cat (Profelis aurata), African pygmy squirrel (Myosciurus pumilio), Allen's striped bat (Chalinolobus alboguttatus), black colobus (Colobus satanas), Cameroon climbing mouse (Dendromus oreas) also endemic, Cameroon soft-furred mouse (Praomys morio) also endemic, cheetah (Acinonyx jubatus), Cooper's mountain squirrel (Paraxerus cooperi) also endemic, Hun shrew (Crocidura attila), Isabella shrew (Sylvisorex isabellae), Ja slit-faced bat (Nycteris major), lion (Panthera leo), mandrill (Mandrillus sphinx), Oku mouse shrew (Myosorex okuensis) also endemic, red-eared guenon (Cercopithecus erythrotis), red-fronted gazelle (Gazella rufifrons), spotted-necked otter (Lutra maculicollis) and West African manatee (Trichechus senegalensis).

== Threats ==
The wildlife is under threat due to many factors. These are: conversion of forest land for agricultural use on account of their rich soil derived from volcanic rocks; pressure to meet firewood requirements; forest fires, particularly in grass land areas; the development of industrial complexes hydro-electric power plants and bauxite mining and forest land slotted for the purpose; as well as hunting. Forest loss in the Bamenda-Banso Highlands and also to certain degree in the Obudu Plateau is reported as more than 50% since the 1960s because of conversion to agricultural lands and good rainfall conditions. Hunting is recorded in the cross border regions of Cameroon. Trading in bush meat is common in the Sangha River Region; bush meat trade is reported to be concurrent with the logging operations. Hunting for ivory, skins and other animal parts is also reported in many national park areas in Cameroon, from within the country and also from cross border poachers.

== Conservation ==
Many NGOs are working in Cameroon for the conservation and preservation of wild life.

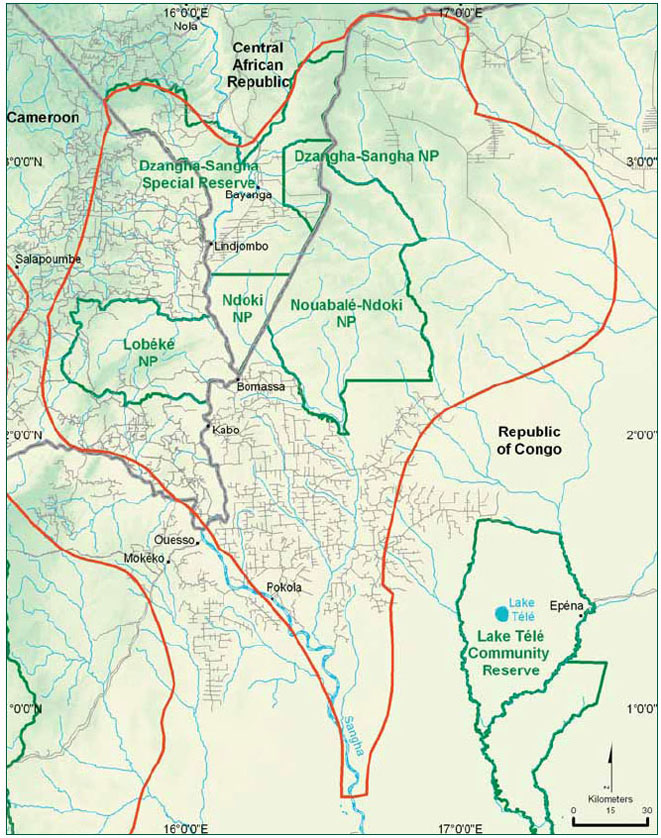
The Sangha Tri National Landscape. The park is labelled.

Conservation efforts in the Sangha River Tri-national Protected Area are in place in a trans-boundary program sponsored by the World Wide Fund for Nature (WWF) with participation by the Central African Republic, the Congo and the Cameroon. This covers a total area of 2,800,000 hectares (6,900,000 acres) encompassing the Dzanga Sangha Special Reserve (the second largest area in the world) in the Central African Republic, which incorporates within its ambit the Nouabalé-Ndoki National Park in the Republic of Congo (Brazzaville) and the Lobéké National Park in Cameroon. Appropriate actions are under implementation in respect of anti-poaching, research and the promotion of tourism to the rain forests (the mammal species of particular interest are elephants, apes, ranging from western lowland gorilla to chimpanzees and bongo). The three park-administrations and the prefects of the three countries meet often to ensure proper monitoring of the conservation activities. Patrolling of the parks is a regular joint effort to prevent poaching, smuggling of ivory and unauthorized fishing and carriage of fire arms in the reserve park

The German Cooperation of Technical Collaboration (GTC) in Central African Republic and Cameroon, and the World Wildlife Fund for Nature (WWF) and Wildlife Conservation Society (WCS - New York) in the Congo are providing large funds for conservation of the parks.

A particular success story of the enabled protection, particularly in the Nouabalé-Ndoki National Park is of the special group of 'eco-guards', who operate under the MFEE (Ministry of Forestry Economy and the Environment), unlike the past practice of deploying rangers, which is reported to have stopped illegal human activities taking place in the park such as poaching.

Ape Action Africa is one such non-profit NGO which was established in 1996 with the primary objective of conservation of endangered gorillas and chimpanzees, which are threatened by the bushmeat trade in Central and West Africa. The NGO not only helps in the rescue and rehabilitation of great apes but also helps in management of a large sanctuary in the Mefou forest.

== See also ==
- Natural areas of Cameroon
