= Pseudavakubia =

Scientific classification
- Domain: Eukaryota
- Kingdom: Animalia
- Phylum: Mollusca
- Class: Gastropoda
- Order: Stylommatophora
- Family: Streptaxidae
- Genus: Pseudavakubia de Winter & Vastenhout, 2012

Species
- Pseudavakubia atewaensis de Winter, 2013; Pseudavakubia ghanaensis de Winter, 2013; Pseudavakubia liberiana de Winter, 2013; Pseudavakubia majus de Winter & Vastenhout, 2013

Genus of gastropods

Pseudavakubia is a genus of land snails in the subfamily Enneinae.

== Etymology ==
Pseudavakubia refers to the strong resemblance of its shells with those of the genus Avakubia.

== Description ==
Snails inside Pseudavakubia have a small shell with a height ranging from 2.9 to 4.4 mm. Their shells are elongate-ovate or cylindrical and have about 6-7¼ whorls. Their last whorl is smaller than that of Avakubia species.

== Distribution ==
The distribution of Pseudavakubia includes:

- Ghana
- Liberia

== Species ==
Pseudavakubia contains the following species:

- Pseudavakubia atewaensis de Winter, 2013
- Pseudavakubia ghanaensis de Winter, 2013
- Pseudavakubia liberiana de Winter, 2013
- Pseudavakubia majus de Winter & Vastenhout, 2013
