= Ptychotrema mazumbiensis =

Conservation status
- Data Deficient (IUCN 2.3)

Scientific classification
- Kingdom: Animalia
- Phylum: Mollusca
- Class: Gastropoda
- Order: Stylommatophora
- Family: Streptaxidae
- Genus: Ptychotrema
- Species: P. mazumbiensis

Binomial name
- Ptychotrema mazumbiensis Tattersfield, 1999

Species of gastropod

Ptychotrema mazumbiensis is a species of air-breathing land snail, a terrestrial pulmonate gastropod mollusc in the family Streptaxidae.

This species is endemic to Tanzania. Its natural habitat is subtropical or tropical dry forests. It is threatened by habitat loss.
