= Bénoué National Park =

Natural park in Cameroon

- IUCN category II (national park)
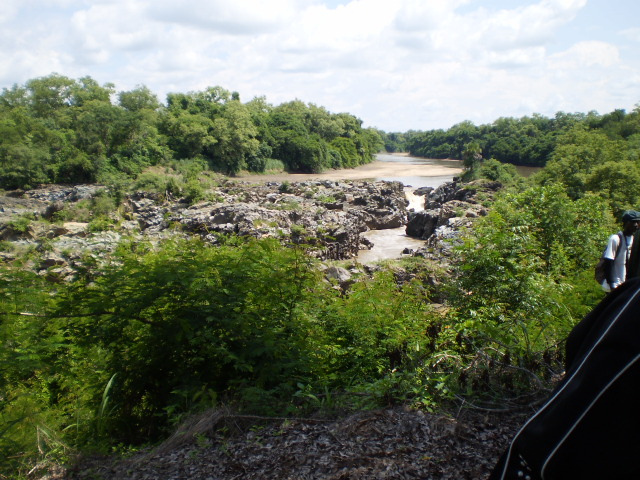

- Location within Cameroon
- Location: Cameroon
- Coordinates: 8°20′N 13°50′E
- Area: 1,800 km^{2} (690 sq mi)
- Established: 1968

Bénoué National Park is a national park of Cameroon and a UNESCO designated Biosphere Reserve. It spans 1,800 km^{2} (690 sq mi) in size. The park has a wide frontage to the Bénoué River, which stretches for over 100 km (62 mi), forming the eastern boundary. The public road to Tcholliré cuts across the northern part of the park. The western boundary is made up of the main road linking the towns of Garoua to the north, with Ngaoundéré to the south. The park can be accessed coming north from Ngaoundéré.

== History ==
In 1932, the area was established as a wildlife reserve. It was upgraded to a national park in 1968, and became a biosphere reserve in 1981.

== Geography ==
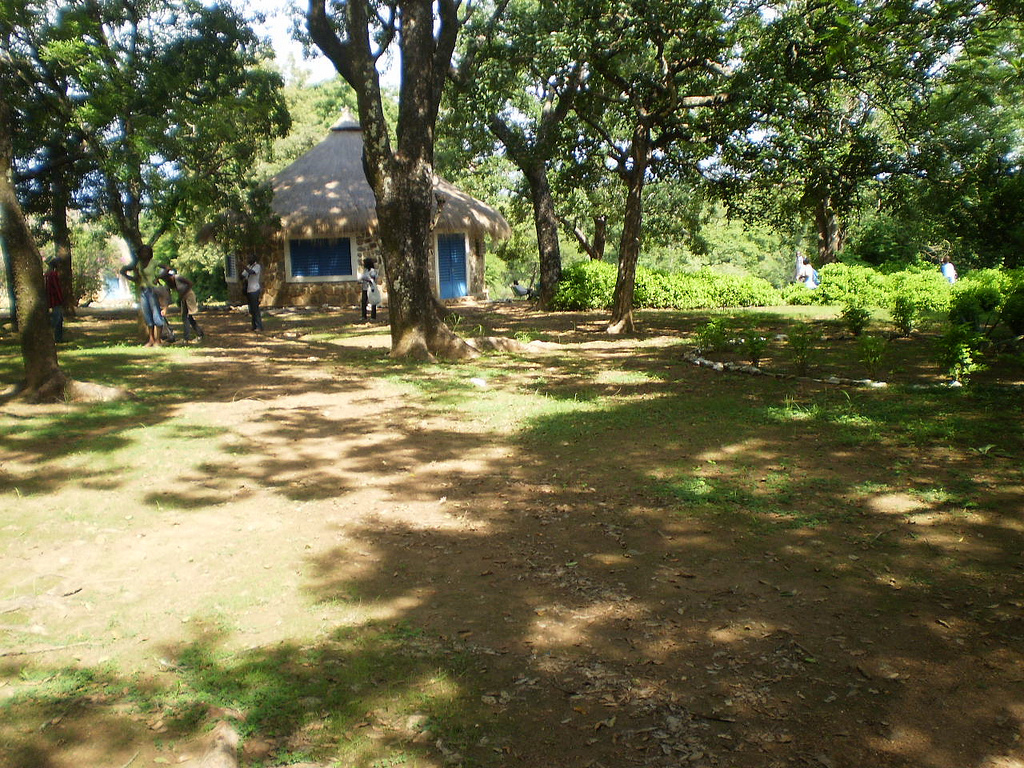
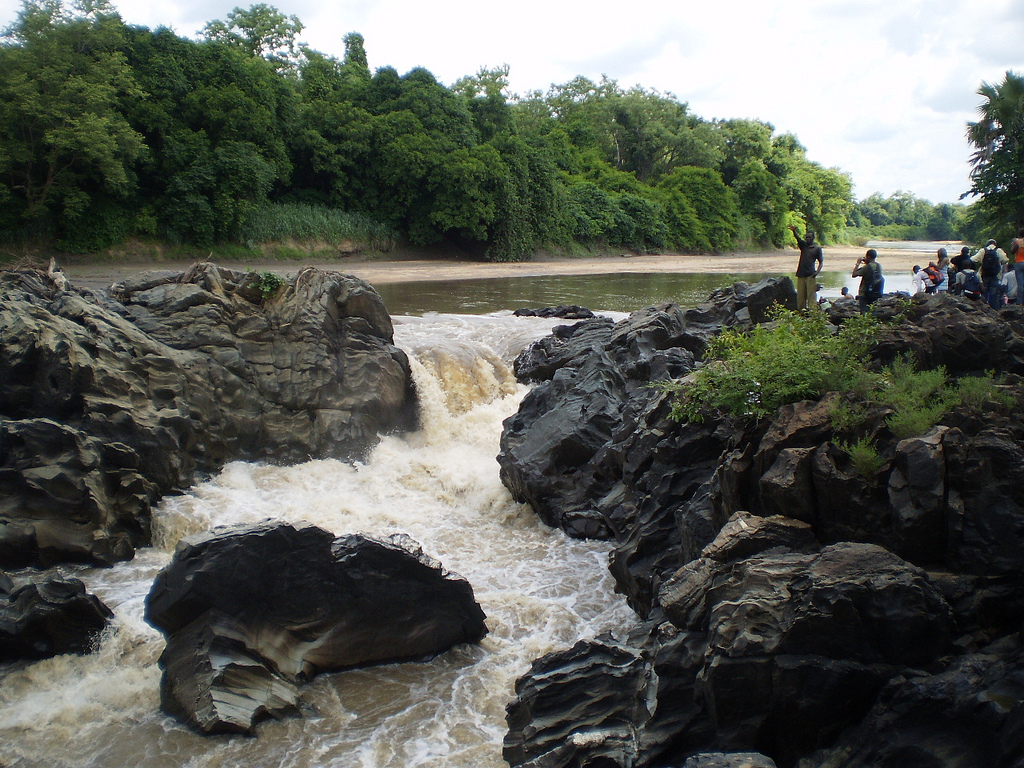

The park is located in northeastern Cameroon in the Bénoué Department. It lies in the Bénoué savanna belt, a humid savannah woodland area between the cities of Garoua to the north and Ngaoundéré to the south. The main river is the Bénoué River, which stretches for over 100 km (62 mi), forming the park's eastern boundary. The park's altitude ranges from 250 to 760 m (820 to 2,490 ft) above sea level. The higher elevations are characterized by large rocky massifs, while the undulating plain and forest characterize the lower sections. Eight hunting reserves, totaling 5,203.78 km^{2} (2,009.19 sq mi), surround the park except along the main road.

== Flora and fauna ==
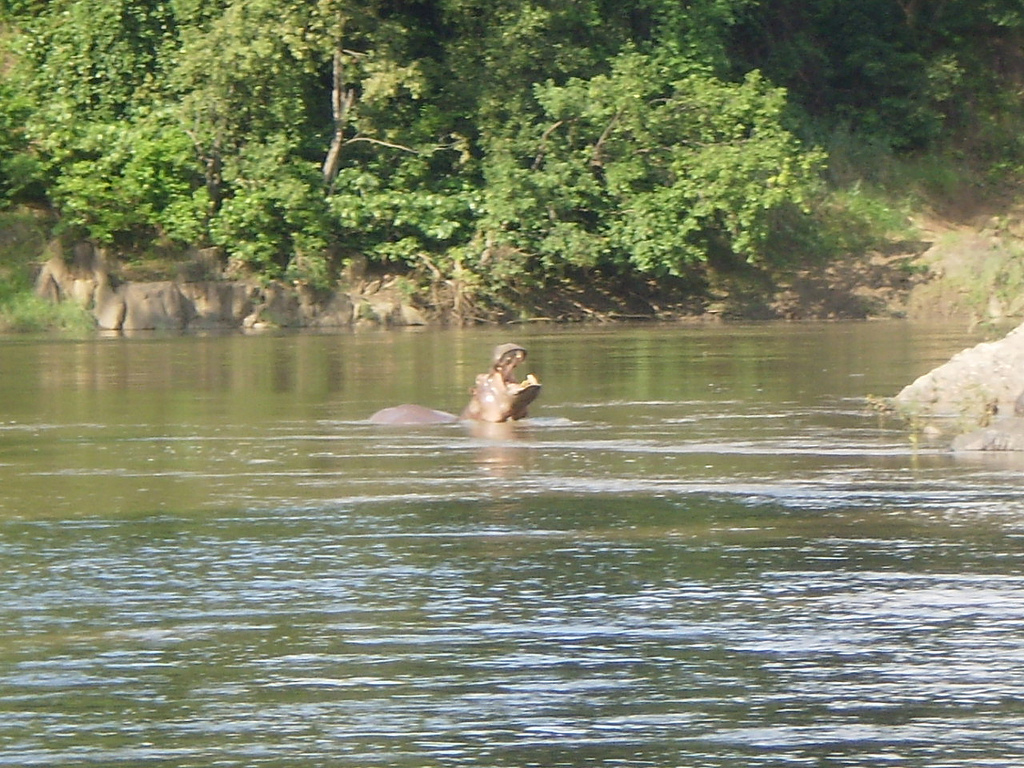
Hippopotamus inside the park

The habitat in Bénoué National Park is characterized by wooded grassland. It includes several types of Sudanian woodland such as Isoberlinia-dominated and other woodland in the south-centre, to shorter, more open, mixed wooded grassland in the north, dry Anogeissus forest, semi-evergreen riparian forest and thickets along the Bénoué and its major affluents.

African elephant, spotted hyena, waterbuck, warthog and monkeys are also found in the park. The predominant large ungulates in the park are antelope such as the kob, western hartebeest, giant eland and waterbuck, as well as African buffalo. The only place in Africa where there is a realistic chance to view the giant eland, Africa's largest antelope, is within Bénoué National Park. The African wild dog is present within the national park, though less common here than in Faro National Park. Bénoué National Park is known for its hippopotamus colonies. Along with hippo, crocodile are common in the rivers.

Since 2005, the protected area is considered a Lion Conservation Unit. In 2011, the lion population was estimated at 200 adult individuals.

Bénoué National Park is an Important Bird Area (#CM007) with recent surveys identifying 306 species. In the dry season, sandbars exposed by fluctuating levels of the sandy Bénoué River provide habitat for plover and other waterbirds. Common species include Adamawa turtle-dove, crocodile bird, red-throated bee-eater, red-winged grey warbler, stone partridge, and violet turaco.

== Population ==
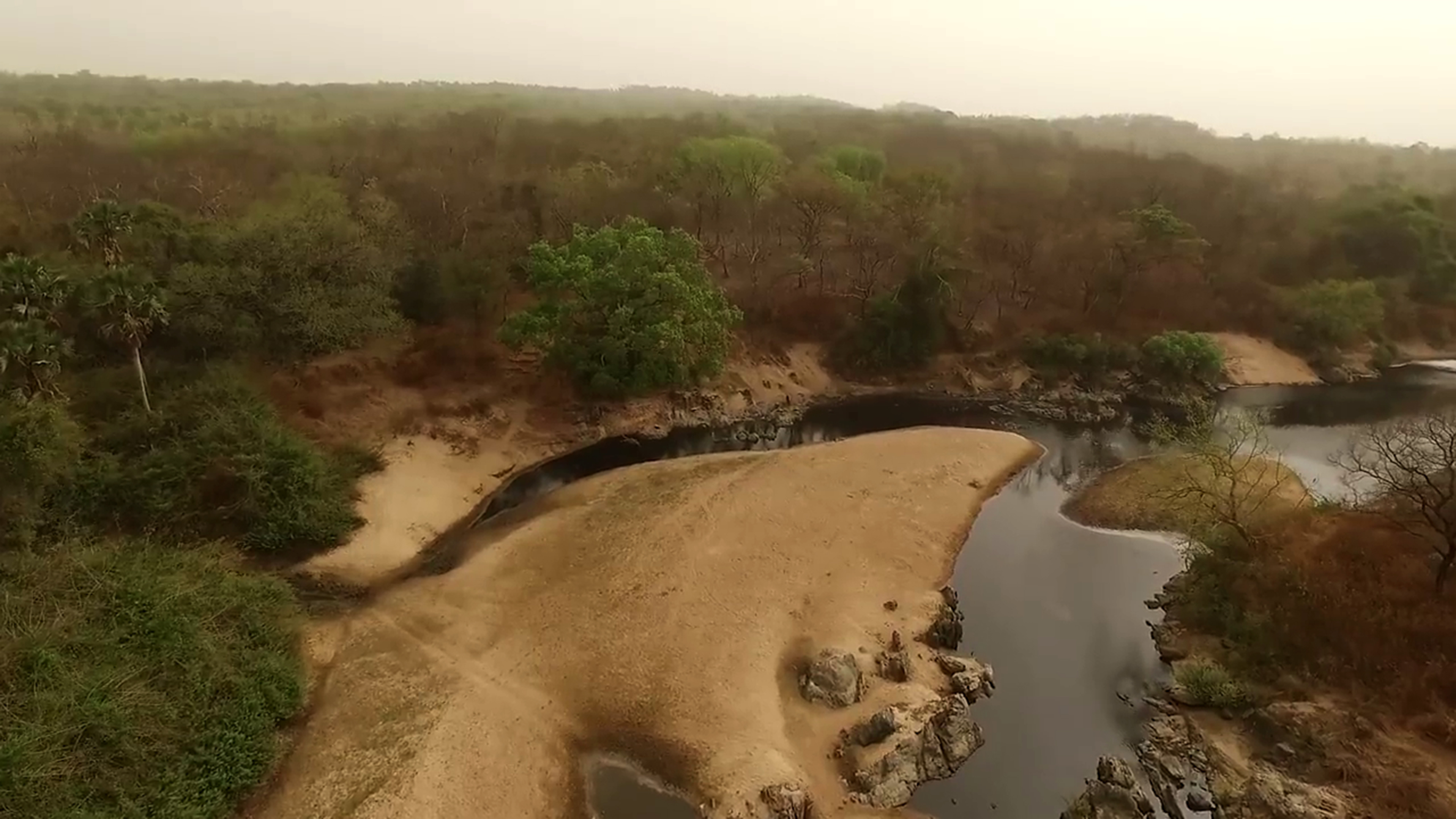
Bénoué view

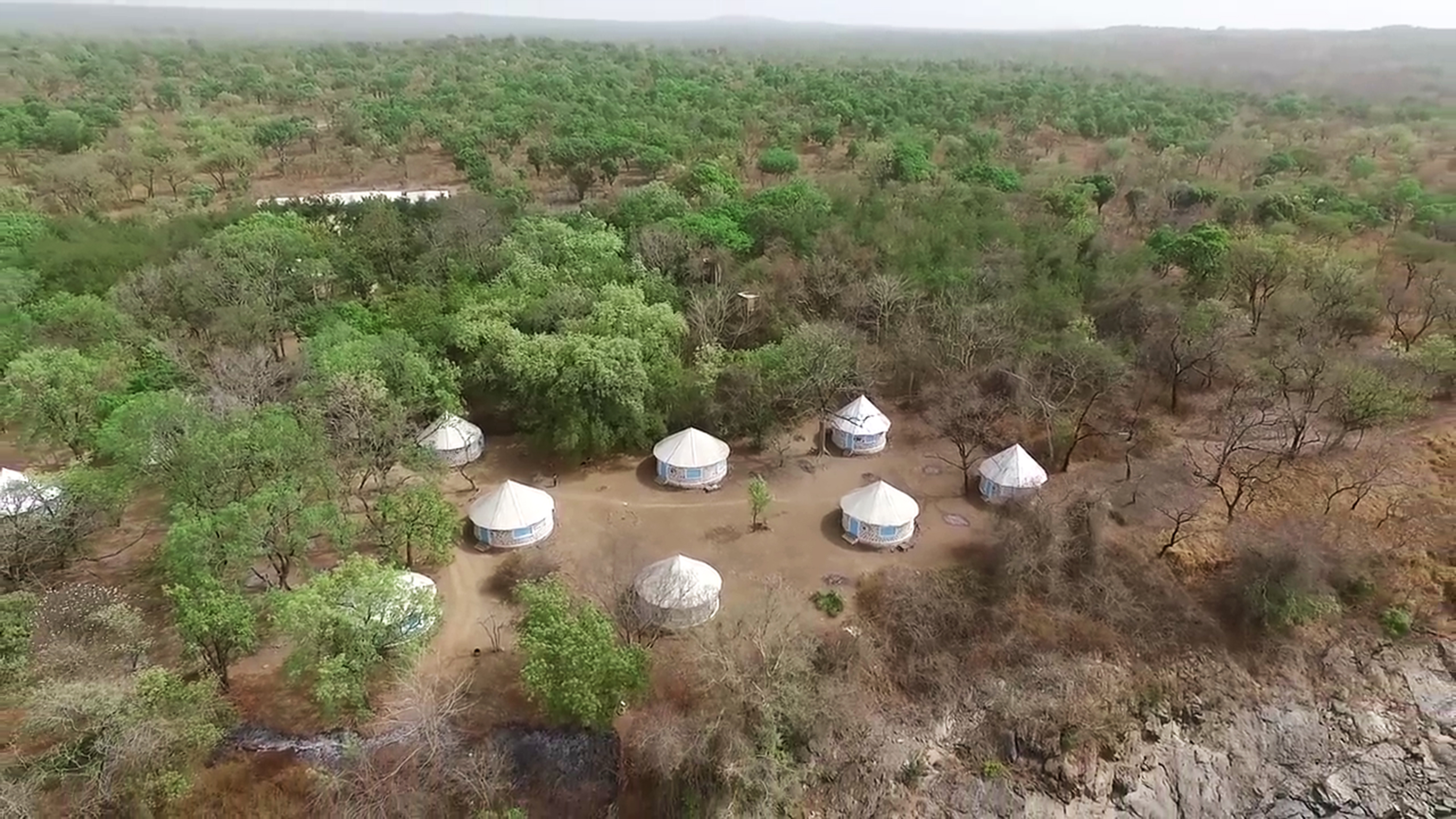
Benoue huts

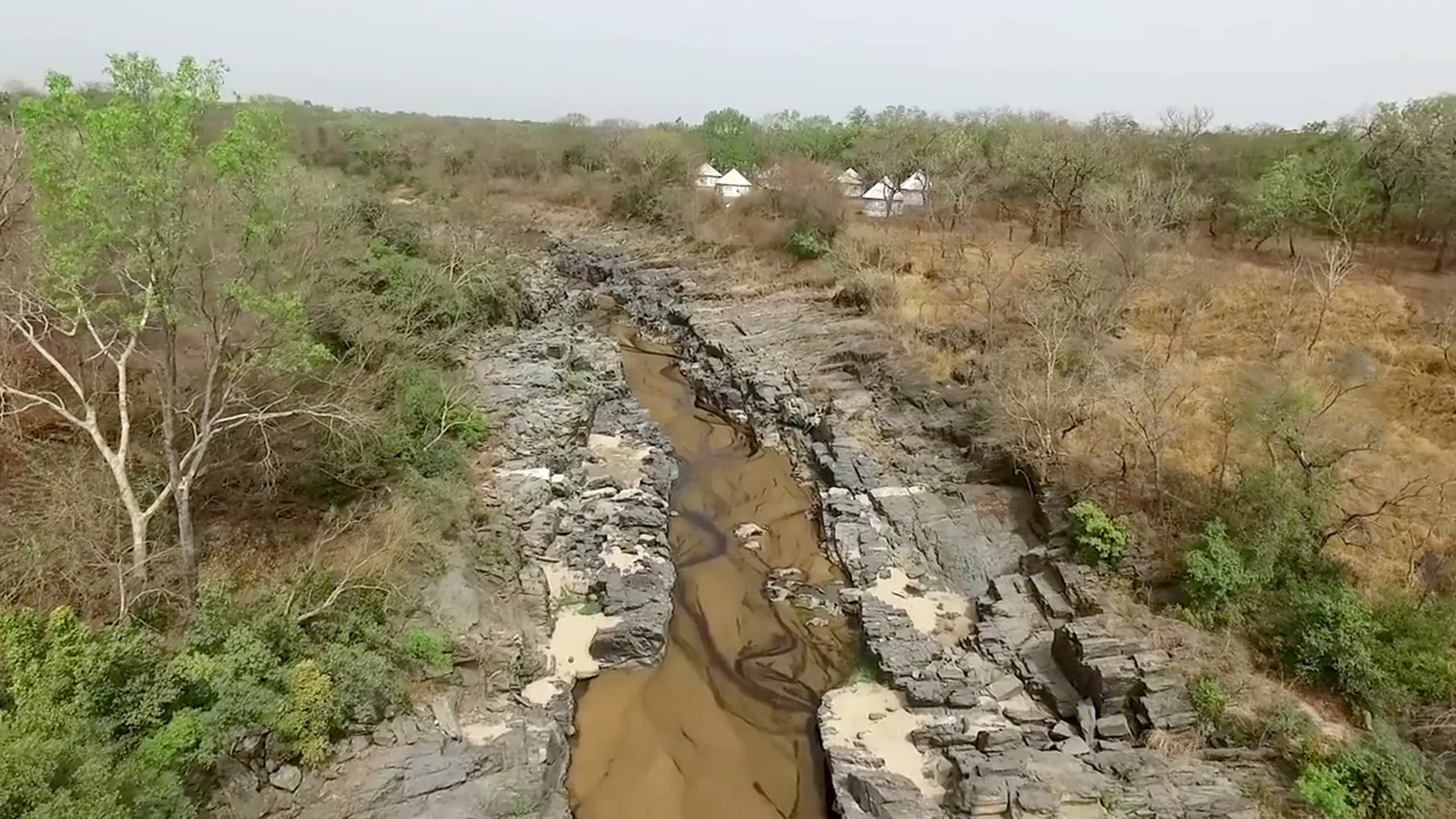
Houses within Bénoué National Park

The majority of the population within the park is nomadic. There is a loose social structure that park guards and conservationists deal with, taking on roles such as community educators and arbitrators. At least one incident of kleptoparasitism, villagers stealing meat from a lion kill, was documented at Bénoué National Park.

== See also ==
- Wildlife of Cameroon
