= Ptychotrema usambarense =

Conservation status
- Data Deficient (IUCN 2.3)

Scientific classification
- Kingdom: Animalia
- Phylum: Mollusca
- Class: Gastropoda
- Order: Stylommatophora
- Family: Streptaxidae
- Genus: Ptychotrema
- Species: P. usambarense

Binomial name
- Ptychotrema usambarense Verdcourt, 1958

Species of gastropod

Ptychotrema usambarense is a species of air-breathing land snail, a terrestrial pulmonate gastropod mollusc in the family Streptaxidae.

This species is endemic to Tanzania.
