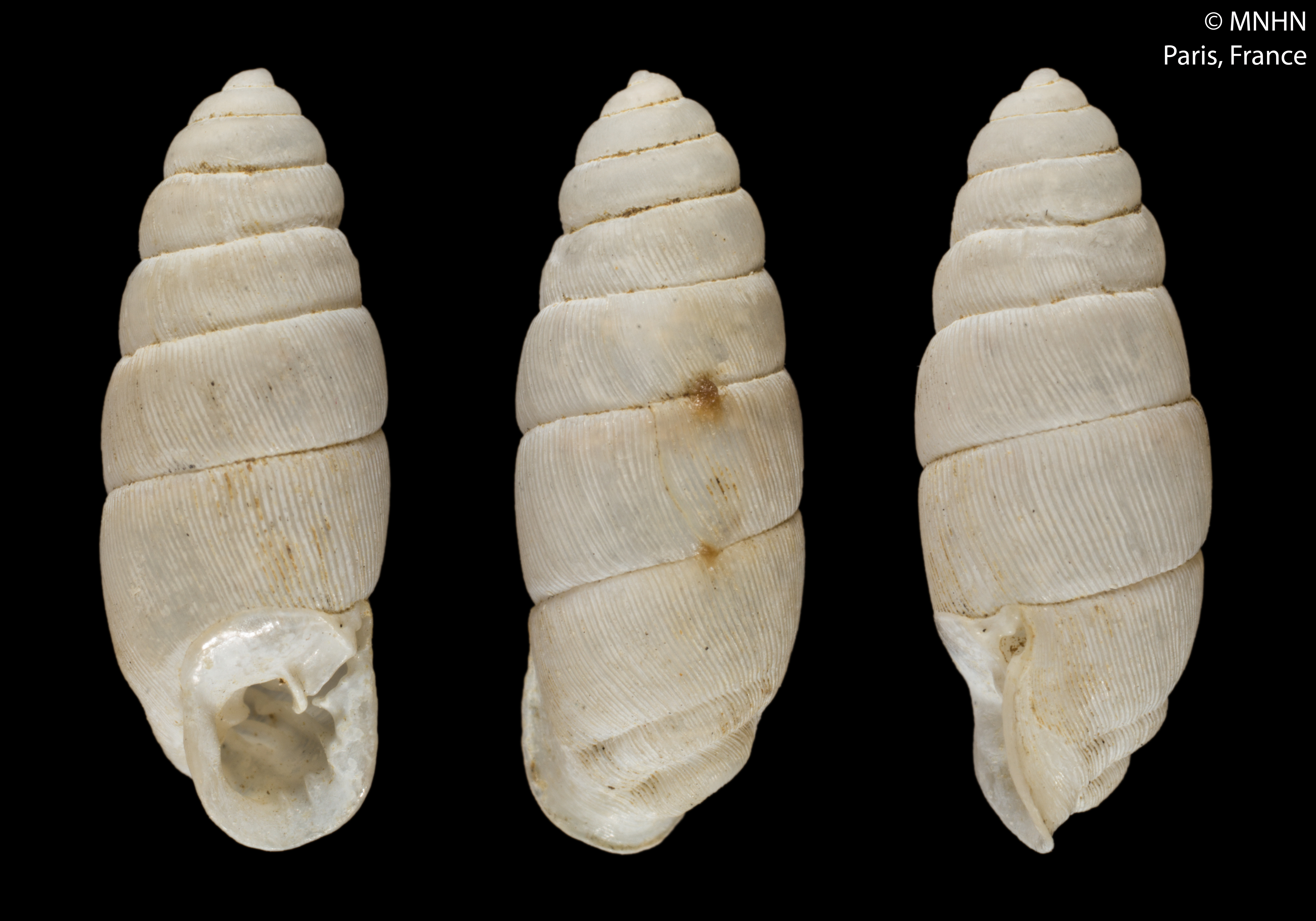
- Shell of Ptychotrema assiniense, a part of the Ptychotrema genus.

Scientific classification
- Kingdom: Animalia
- Phylum: Mollusca
- Class: Gastropoda
- Order: Stylommatophora
- Family: Streptaxidae
- Subfamily: Enneinae; Bourguignat, 1883

Synonyms
- Enneidae Bourguignat, 1883 superseded rank; Ptychotrematinae Pilsbry, 1919 ·; Streptostelidae Bourguignat, 1890 ·

= Enneinae =

Subfamily of land snails

Enneinae is a subfamily of land snails in the family Streptaxidae.

== Description ==
The animals of the Aenneidae resemble those of the Testacellidae or Streptaxidae due to the lack of a jaw. However, their shells bear no resemblance to those of these families.

Their shells are much closer to those of Bulimes and Pupas than to Testacellas or Streptaxis.

== Genera ==
- Avakubia Pilsbry, 1919
- Costigulella Pilsbry, 1919
- Digulella F. Haas, 1934
- Mirigulella Pilsbry & Cockerell, 1933
- Paucidentella Thiele, 1933
- Pseudavakubia de Winter & Vastenhout, 2013
- Ptychotrema L. Pfeiffer, 1853
- Pupigulella Pilsbry, 1919
- Rhabdogulella F. Haas, 1934
- Silvigulella Pilsbry, 1919
- Sphincterocochlion Verdcourt, 1985
- Sphinctostrema Girard, 1894
- Streptostele Dohrn, 1866
- Tomostele Ancey, 1885
