= Costigulella =

Scientific classification
- Kingdom: Animalia
- Phylum: Mollusca
- Class: Gastropoda
- Order: Stylommatophora
- Family: Streptaxidae
- Genus: Costigulella; Pilsbry, 1919

Genus of gastropods

Costigulella is a genus of land snails in the subfamily Enneinae.

== Distribution ==
Costigulella can be found in the Democratic Republic of the Congo, Cameroon, and Equatorial Guinea. It can also be found in Liberia and occasionally in the country of Guinea.

== Species ==
- Costigulella hedwigae (Degner, 1934)
- Costigulella kazibae (Adam, 1984)
- Costigulella langi (Pilsbry, 1919)
- Costigulella mfamosingi Oke, 2013
- Costigulella obani (Oke, 2007)
- Costigulella pooensis (Ortiz de Zárate López & Ortiz de Zárate Rocandio, 1956)
- Costigulella primennilus de Winter, 2008
- Costigulella toticostata (Pilsbry, 1919)
