= Digulella =

Scientific classification
- Kingdom: Animalia
- Phylum: Mollusca
- Class: Gastropoda
- Order: Stylommatophora
- Family: Streptaxidae
- Subfamily: Enneinae
- Genus: Digulella; F. Haas, 1934

Species
- Digulella acutidens (O. Boettger, 1905); Digulella bitzeensis (Connolly, 1922); Digulella capitata (A. A. Gould, 1843); Digulella cavidnes (E. von Martens, 1876); Digulella vriesiana (Ancey, 1885)

Genus of gastropods

Digulella is a genus of land snails in the subfamily Enneinae.

== Distribution ==
Digulella species have been found in regions all over Africa, with most occurrences being around the Gulf of Guinea, mostly inside Cameroon.

== Species ==
The genus contains 5 species.

- Digulella acutidens (O. Boettger, 1905)
- Digulella bitzeensis (Connolly, 1922)
- Digulella capitata (A. A. Gould, 1843)
- Digulella cavidnes (E. von Martens, 1876)
- Digulella vriesiana (Ancey, 1885)
