= Western vlei rat =

Conservation status
- Vulnerable (IUCN 3.1)

Scientific classification
- Kingdom: Animalia
- Phylum: Chordata
- Class: Mammalia
- Order: Rodentia
- Family: Muridae
- Genus: Otomys
- Species: O. occidentalis

Binomial name
- Otomys occidentalis Dieterlen & Van der Straeten, 1992

Species of rodent

The western vlei rat (Otomys occidentalis) is a species of rodent in the family Muridae. It is found in Cameroon and Nigeria. Its natural habitats are subtropical or tropical high-altitude grassland and swamps. It is threatened by habitat loss.
