= Avakubia =

Scientific classification
- Kingdom: Animalia
- Phylum: Mollusca
- Class: Gastropoda
- Order: Stylommatophora
- Family: Streptaxidae
- Genus: Avakubia; Pilsbry, 1919

Type species
- Gulella (Avakubia) avakubiensis Pilsbry, 1919

Synonyms
- Gulella (Avakubia) Pilsbry, 1919 superseded rank

Genus of gastropods

Avakubia is a genus of land snails in the subfamily Enneinae.

== Etymology ==
The name Avakubia refers to the village of Avakubi inside the Democratic Republic of the Congo, where the genus was first discovered.

== Distribution ==
Species inside the genus Avakubia can be found around the Gulf of Guinea. The vast majority of occurrences are in Cameroon.

== Species ==
Avakubia contains nine species.

- Avakubia acuminata (Thiele, 1933)
- Avakubia avakubiensis (Pilsbry, 1919)
- Avakubia biokoensis de Winter & Vastenhout, 2013
- Avakubia crystallums de Winter, 2013
- Avakubia fruticicola de Winter & Vastenhout, 2013
- Avakubia occidentalis de Winter, 2013
- Avakubia ortizdezarateorum de Winter & Vastenhout, 2013
- Avakubia semenguei de Winter & Vastenhout, 2013
- Avakubia subacuminata de Winter & Vastenhout, 2013
