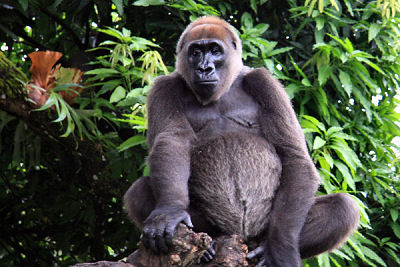
- Gorilla at the Limbe Wildlife Center in Cameroon

Conservation status
- Critically Endangered (IUCN 3.1)
- CITES Appendix I

Scientific classification
- Kingdom: Animalia
- Phylum: Chordata
- Class: Mammalia
- Order: Primates
- Superfamily: Hominoidea
- Family: Hominidae
- Genus: Gorilla
- Species: G. gorilla
- Subspecies: G. g. diehli

Trinomial name
- Gorilla gorilla diehli (Matschie, 1904)
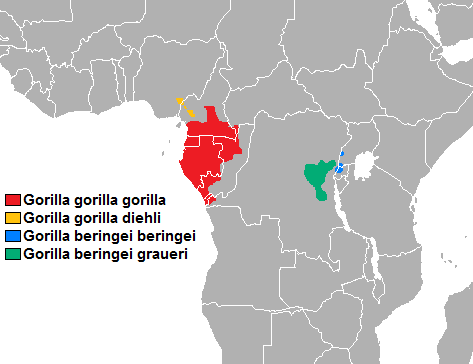
- Distribution range in yellow

= Cross River gorilla =

Cross River gorilla Temporal range: Pleistocene to recent

Subspecies of the western gorilla

The Cross River gorilla (Gorilla gorilla diehli) is a critically endangered subspecies of the western gorilla (Gorilla gorilla). It was named a new species in 1904 by Paul Matschie, a mammalian taxonomist working at the Humboldt University Zoological Museum in Berlin, but its populations were not systematically surveyed until 1987.

It is the most western and northern form of gorilla, and is restricted to the forested hills and mountains of the Cameroon-Nigeria border region at the headwaters of the Cross River. It is separated by about 300 km (190 mi) from the nearest population of western lowland gorillas (Gorilla gorilla gorilla), and by around 250 km (160 mi) from the gorilla population in the Ebo Forest of Cameroon. Estimates from 2014 suggest that fewer than 250 mature Cross River gorillas remain, making them the world's rarest great ape. Groups of these gorillas concentrate their activities in 11 localities across a 12,000 km^{2} (4,600 sq mi) range, though recent field surveys confirmed the presence of gorillas outside of their known localities suggesting a wider distribution within this range. This distribution is supported by genetic research, which has found evidence that many Cross River gorilla localities continue to maintain contact through the occasional dispersal of individuals. In 2009, the Cross River gorilla was finally captured on professional video on a forested mountain in Cameroon.

== Description ==
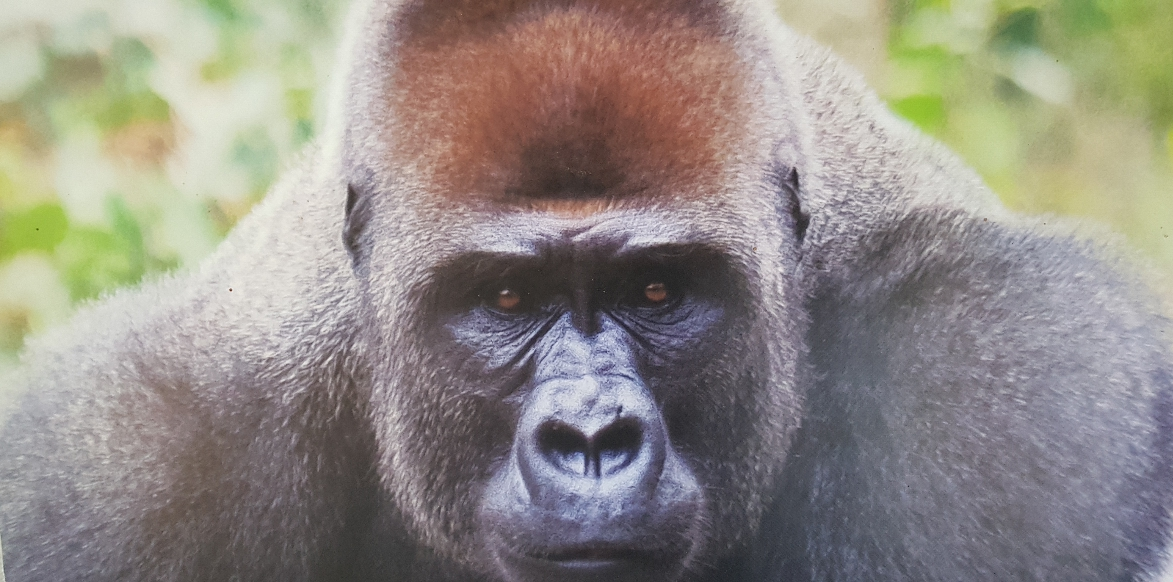
Facial view of an adult Cross River Gorilla in Mefou sanctuary

The Cross River gorilla was first described as a new species of the western gorilla by Paul Matschie, a mammalian taxonomist, in 1904. Its morphological distinctiveness was confirmed in 1987. Subsequent analyses of cranial and tooth morphology, long bone proportions and distribution demonstrated the distinctiveness of the Cross River gorilla and it was described as a distinct subspecies in 2000.

When comparing the Cross River gorilla to western lowland gorillas, they have noticeably smaller palates, smaller cranial vaults, and shorter skulls. The Cross River gorilla is not known to differ much in terms of body size or limb and bone length from western lowland gorillas. However, measurements taken from a male suggest that they have shorter hands and feet and have a larger opposability index than western lowland gorillas.

According to Sarmiento and Oate's study published by the American Museum of Natural History, the Cross River gorilla has been described as having smaller dentitions, smaller palates, smaller cranial vaults, and shorter skulls than western lowland gorillas. The Royal Belgian Institute of Natural Sciences depicted the Cross River gorilla as the largest living primate with a barrel-chest, relatively even hair, a bare black face and chest, small ears, bare shaped brows that are joined, and nostril margins that are raised. They are clearly not the largest gorillas and the distinctiveness of their external characters still needs to be verified. Other statistics include:

- Average adult male height: 1.65–1.75 m (5.4–5.7 ft).
- Average adult male weight: 140–200 kg (310–440 lb).
- Average adult female height: 1.4 m (4.6 ft).
- Average adult female weight: 100 kg (220 lb).

== Evolution ==
In 2000 Esteban E. Sarmiento and John F. Oates proposed and supported the hypothesis that the Cross River gorilla began to evolve into a distinct subspecies of Gorilla gorilla during an arid period of the African Pleistocene phase in response to declining food sources and a greater emphasis on herbivory and terrestrial behaviors.

The team stated that ancestors to the Cross River gorilla may have been secluded to the forests near the Cross River headwaters and/or elsewhere in the Cameroon highlands. They wrote that the Cross River gorillas may not have spread much since their isolation. The Gorilla gorilla gorilla ancestors differentiated from the Cross River gorilla by spreading beyond this area somewhere to the south and/or east of the Sanaga. Sarmiento and Oates stated that there is no evidence to suggest that G. g. gorilla and G. g. diehli are sympatric.

== Habitat ==
The Cross River gorilla, like many other gorilla subspecies, prefer a dense forest habitat that is uninhabited by humans. Due to the Cross River gorilla's body size they require large and diverse areas of the forest to meet their habitat requirements. Similar to most endangered primates, their natural habitat exists where humans are often occupying and using for natural resources. Forests that are inhabited by the Cross River gorilla vary in altitude from approximately 100 to 2,037 metres (328 to 6,683 ft) above sea level. Between 1996 and 1999, Field work was conducted on Afi Mountain in Cross River State, Nigeria for a period of 32 months. A great deal of data were collected, and things such as habitat types and topography mapped using line transects, climate, spatial and temporal availability of tree and herb foods and also the Cross River gorilla's wide range behavior, diet, and its grouping patterns. These data were all assessed from indirect evidence, such as feeding trails, nests, and feces.

The habitats of the Cross River gorilla are negatively affected by the drastic deforestation and fragmentation of the land. These unfortunate events leave the gorilla species with few options for survival. As a result of deforestation and fragmentation, there are drastic reductions in carrying capacity, in other words, the size of the territories these animals inhabit has been significantly reduced. Because the population of humans living in this area is high, the amount of resources available to the Cross River gorillas is limited. Even though this decrease in the availability of land may appear to be a problem, research studies have found that an adequate amount of rainforest still remains that is suitable and comfortable for this subspecies. If, however, human pressures and activities towards deforestation continue, these territories will continue to diminish and ultimately will not exist. Additional examples of human activity that threaten Cross River gorillas and, of course, other species, are hunting, logging, agriculture, fuel wood harvesting, clearance of lands for plantation and exploitation of natural resources. Gorillas and other primates are only a small part of the larger ecosystem and thus, they rely on many aspects of their habitat for survival. Furthermore, also because of their body size, they lack ability to adapt to new environment and they have a rather slow reproductive rate. Even though there is somewhat of a limited research on Cross River gorillas, there is enough to conclude that these animals are currently able to sustain survival. What is still under debate is the total number of Cross River gorillas that exist.

The Cross River gorilla is not only a critically endangered subspecies, as labeled by the IUCN, International Union for Conservation of Nature, but is under studied. The limited territories of their natural population have led Cross River gorillas to be isolated approximately 200 kilometres (120 mi) away from other gorilla populations. This region is around the Nigeria-Cameroon border in which there are highland areas creating geographic restrictions for these gorillas. During the 20th century, Cross River gorillas were known to roam lowland localities, however, due to habitat loss and other human-made factors such as resource exploitation, Cross River gorillas were driven to inhabit only hill areas. This led to a decrease of resource availability as well as land availability. Most of the regions inhabited by Cross River gorillas are legally protected due to the species' critically endangered status. However, there are still areas that are not, like between the Kagwene Mountain and Upper Mbulu, and around Mone North.

== Behavior ==
A study published in 2007 in the American Journal of Primatology announced the discovery of the subspecies fighting back against possible threats from humans. They "found several instances of gorillas throwing sticks and clumps of grass". This is unusual. When encountered by humans, gorillas usually flee and rarely charge.

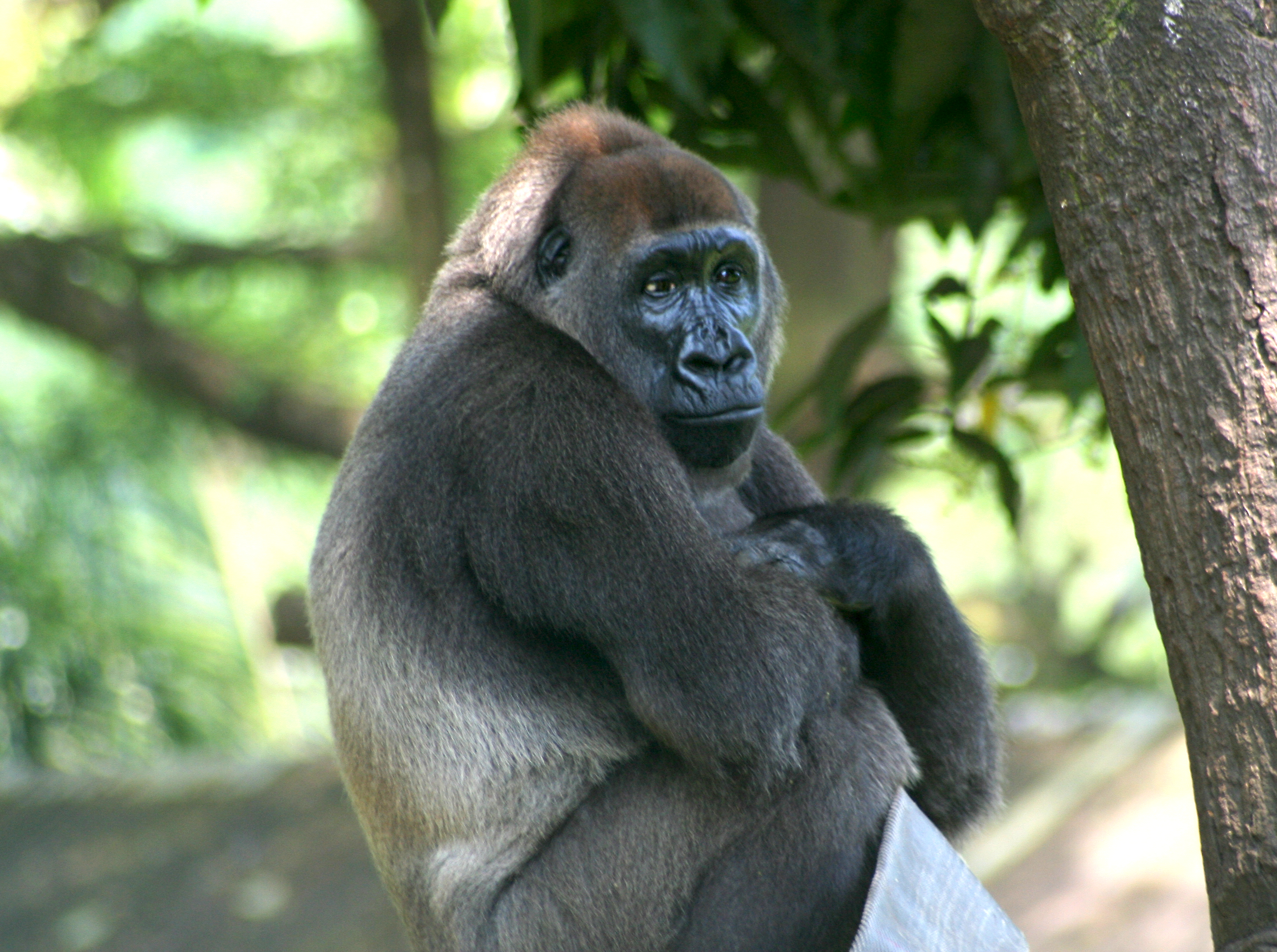
Nyango, the only known Cross River gorilla in captivity. She died on October 10, 2016.

Cross River gorillas have certain nesting behaviors (i.e. mean nest group size, style of the nest, location of the nest, and nest reuse patterns) that depend on things such as their current habitat, climate, food source availability and risk of attack or vulnerability. According to research done on the Cross River gorillas living in the Kagwene Gorilla Sanctuary, there is a high correlation between whether a nest is constructed on the ground or in a tree and the season. From April up until November, Cross River gorillas are more likely to build their nests within a tree, and from November on they are more likely to build it on the ground. Overall, it was found that more nests built at night were built on the ground as opposed to in trees. This species is also more likely to construct nests during the wet season than the dry season, as well as construct more arboreal nests in the wet season. It was found that day nest construction was more common, especially in the wet season. Reuse of nesting sites was also found to be common, although it did not have any relation to the season. And, their mean nest group size is from four to seven individuals. Although, nest group size varies depending on the location of the species.

The groups of Cross River gorillas consist mainly of one male and six to seven females plus their offspring. Gorillas in lowlands are seen to have fewer offspring than those in the highlands. This is thought to be because of the hunting rate in the lowlands and infant mortality rate. The groups in the highlands are densely populated compared to those in the lowlands.

The Cross River gorilla's diet consists largely of fruit, herbaceous vegetation, liana, and tree bark. Much like their nesting habits, what they eat is contingent on the season. Observations of the gorilla indicate that it seems to prefer fruit, but will settle for other sources of nutrition during the dry season of about 4–5 months in northern regions. Cross River gorillas eat more liana and tree bark throughout the year, and less fruit during dry periods of scarcity.

=== Diet ===
The Cross River gorilla usually lives in small groups of 4–7 individuals with a few males and a few female members. Their diet usually consists of fruit, but in fruit scarce months, (August–September, November–January) their diet is primarily made up of terrestrial herbs, and the bark and leaves of climber and trees. Many of the Cross River gorilla food sources are very seasonal and thus their diets are filled with very dense, nutritious vegetation that is usually found near their nesting sites. It was found that the Afi Mountain group of Cross River gorilla diet mostly consisted Aframomum spp. (Zingiberaceae) herbs, but when available in the wet season, they preferred to eat Amorphophallus difformis (Araceae) over the Aframomum, showing preference for certain foods that were seasonal and also an affinity to the vegetation that was only found in their habitat.

=== Nesting ===
The nesting behavior of the Cross River gorilla is influenced by the environmental conditions, such as the climate, predation, herbaceous vegetation, absence of suitable nest building materials and seasonal fruits nearby. The gorillas have certain nesting habit consistencies like mean nest group sizes, size and type of nest created, as well as the reuse of certain nesting locations nearby seasonal food sources. In Sunderland-Groves et al.'s research on the nesting behavior of G. g. diehli at Kagwene Mountain they discovered that the nesting locations, whether on the ground or arboreal, were greatly influenced by the current season. During the dry season most of the nests were made on the ground, yet during the wet season the majority of the nests were made high in the trees, to provide protection from the rain. It was also found that the gorillas created more day nest during the wet season and reused nesting sites about 35% of the time. It was also found that the mean group size was 4–7 individuals, yet the mean nest size at the sites was 12.4 nests and the most frequent number of nests was 13, showing some gorillas may have made multiple nests. The researchers also found nest sites with up to 26 nests, showing that sometimes multiple groups would nest together.

=== Aggression ===
The Cross River gorilla at the Kagwene Mountain in Cameroon has been observed using tools and it seems to be unique to the population in this region. They have been observed in three separate cases, in which they threw grass at the researchers, a detached branch and in a third case, in which an encounter with a man who threw rocks at them led them to throw back fistfuls of grass. All the encounters had the gorillas in the group observe the researchers and react to their presence with vocalizations then led to calm behavior in the parts of the gorillas and finally an approach by the male gorillas and the throwing of grass at the researcher. The researchers have stated that this throwing behavior might have arisen due to human contact in the field and farms surrounding the mountain and the ambivalent nature of the gorillas is due to the surrounding people not hunting the gorillas due to the folklore about the gorillas.

== Geographical distribution ==
This subspecies is populated at the border between Nigeria and Cameroon, in both tropical and subtropical moist broadleaf forests which are also home to the Nigeria-Cameroon chimpanzee, another subspecies of great ape. The Cross River gorilla is the most western and northern form of gorilla, and is restricted to the forested hills and mountains of the Cameroon-Nigeria border region at the headwaters of the Cross River. It is separated by about 300 km (190 mi) from the nearest population of western lowland gorilla (Gorilla gorilla gorilla), and by around 250 km (160 mi) from the gorilla population in the Ebo Forest of Cameroon. Groups of these gorillas concentrate their activities in 11 localities across a 12,000 km^{2} (4,600 sq mi) range, though recent field surveys confirmed the presence of gorillas outside of their known localities suggesting a wider distribution within this range. This distribution is corroborated by genetic research, which has found evidence that many Cross River gorilla localities continue to maintain contact through the occasional dispersal of individuals.

The occurrence of Cross River gorillas has been confirmed in the Mbe Mountains and the Forest Reserves of Afi River, Boshi Extension, and Okwanggo of Nigeria's Cross River State, and in the Takamanda and Mone River Forest Reserves, and the Mbulu Forest, of the Cameroon's South West Province. These locations cover a mostly continuous forest area of about 8,000 km^{2} (3,100 sq mi) from Afi Mountain to Kagwene Mountain according to the 2007 regional action plan for Cross River gorilla conservation. Researchers and conservationists also postulate that there is a possible outlying locality in the forests near Bechati in the southeast. Today it's estimated that their total population area covers about 12,000 km^{2} (4,600 sq mi). Cross River gorillas have been known to cling to the Afi-to-Kagwene landscape because of its rugged terrain and high altitude which keeps it secluded from human interference.

However, a study conducted in 2013 found that Cross River gorillas also inhabit areas lower in altitude such as the Mawambi Hills. This site is about 552 m (1,811 ft) above sea level, which is much lower than their average niche at about 776 m (2,546 ft) above sea level.

=== Habitat loss ===
Cross River gorillas reside in small populations split from other subpopulations of the species. They occupy roughly 14 apparently geographically separated areas in a landscape of approximately 12,000 km^{2} (4,600 sq mi) of rugged terrain spanning the Nigeria–Cameroon border region with population sizes estimated at 75–110 in Nigeria, and 125–185 in Cameroon. Other sources of degradation such as hunting posed a much higher threat but habitat loss is now posing a much bigger threat to the species and their survival. Populations reside in areas of undisturbed dense forest which is scarce due to human occupation or use for natural resources. The Takamanda National Park and the Kagwene Gorilla Sanctuary are where most of the surviving members reside. Nest distribution was clearly influenced by anthropogenic factors within the sanctuary, with the disturbed southern section of the park avoided. Even though current wildlife laws regarding the areas are in place Cross River gorillas will not nest in areas near humans. Conservation and Eco-guards are empowered, by the government, to enforce wildlife laws within the sanctuary. A planned superhighway to the west of Ekuri community forest was rerouted in 2017, as the highway and its buffer zone would have had a significant impact on the remaining habitat.

=== Fragmented population ===
Researchers estimate that 250-280 individuals remain across 10 fragmented ecological corridors. The increased population of human inhabitants and the expansion of grasslands (due to human activity) has caused a fragmentation of the species into many subpopulations. Many factors (mostly related to human activity) contributed to the fragmentation of the population, including the expansion of farmland, human occupation, lack of accessible habitat and the sparsity of suitable or favorable habitat. Due to this isolation, gene flow has begun to slow and subpopulations are suffering from a lack of gene diversity which could mean a long term issue. A study conducted by researchers found that gene flow accompanied the divergence of western lowland and Cross River gorillas until just 400 or so years ago, which rather supports a scenario in which intensifying human activities may have increased the isolation of these ape populations. The recent decrease in the Cross River population is accordingly most likely attributable to increasing anthropogenic pressure over the last several hundred years.

=== Hunting ===
A more recent phenomenon of the commercialization of bushmeat hunting has caused a large impact on the population. The hunting seems to be more intense within the lowlands and may have contributed to the concentration of gorillas within the highlands and their small population sizes. Despite laws preventing hunting, it still persists due to local consumption and trade to other countries. The laws are rarely effectively enforced, and due to state of the Cross River gorillas, any hunting has a large impact on the population and their survival. All hunting of the population is unsustainable.

== Decline ==
The population of Cross River gorillas declined by 59% between the years 1995 and 2010, a greater decline over that period than any other subspecies of great ape. Apes such as the Cross River gorilla serve as indicators of problems in their environment and also help other species survive. The decline of this species started thirty years ago and has since continued to decline at an alarming rate. The danger of hunters has led these creatures to fear humans and human contact, so sightings of the Cross River gorilla are rare.

Cross River gorillas try to avoid nesting in grasslands and farms, which causes the remaining forest to become fragmented. However, the Cross River gorilla's habitat has become degraded and fragmented. Spatial scale coarse models fail to explain why the gorillas display a highly fragmented distribution within what appears to be a large, continuous area of suitable habitat. When fragmentation occurs, this causes a decrease or even elimination of migration between subpopulations, and therefore causes more inbreeding within a single population. This led to the loss of genetic diversity. This has negative effects on the long-term viability of population fragments, and by extension, the population as whole. Researchers use genetic methods to better understand the Cross River gorilla population. More specifically, certain loci within the genome were of major concern and they helped give the best insight into the subdivisions and dispersal of genetic variation across populations. Surveys suggest that the total population is about 300 individuals and is fragmented across about ten localities with limited reproductive contact. On top of this fragmentation, the Cross River gorilla is also threatened by hunting for bushmeat and for use of their bones for pseudoscientific medical purposes. For example, the exploitation of some primate species in Africa is prohibited because certain local communities embellished them with ritual meanings, and sometimes regarded them as totems, and also used them as tests for medicine.

Another threat to the Cross River gorilla is the harmful gorilla pet trade. To date, there is only one recorded Cross River gorilla in captivity, held at the Limbe Wildlife Center. Although it seems like a small number of gorillas in captivity, the pet trade has posed a large threat to other species of gorillas in the past, and will likely endanger the Cross River gorilla. Since baby gorillas make preferable pets, hunters will often kill the adults protecting the baby.

The Cross River gorilla is critically endangered due to the combined threat of hunters and infection with Ebola. Even if the rate of Ebola mortality along with hunting was rebated, the promise of these gorillas making a fast recovery is unlikely. The reproduction rate of the Cross River gorilla is low and it is estimated that it will take 75 years for the population to fully recover. They are also threatened by loss of habitat due to mining, agriculture, and timber usage.

Despite this, conservationists are optimistic about the gorilla's chances for survival after capturing several adults and babies on film in spring 2020.

== Conservation status ==
While all western gorillas are Critically Endangered (in the case of the western lowland gorilla due in part to the Ebola virus), the Cross River gorilla is the most endangered of the African apes. A 2014 survey estimated that less than 250 mature individuals were left in the wild. However, according to a 2012 survey conducted by Conservation International, the Cross River gorilla did not make "The World's 25 Most Endangered Primates List". In efforts to conserve other species, it has already been determined that scattered populations should be brought together to prevent inbreeding. One problem with the scattered populations of Cross River gorillas is that they are surrounded by human populations that cause threats such as bushmeat hunting and habitat loss. Also, the protected habitats of Cross River gorillas along the Nigeria-Cameroon border are close to hunting regions, which increases the threat of extinction. The Cross River gorilla is especially significant to the ecosystem because they are excellent seed dispersers for certain tropical plant species that would otherwise face extinction.

In 2007, a survey was conducted in five villages in the aim of assessing taboos against hunting and eating these endangered species. In the Lebialem division of Cameroon, 86% of the population were in favour of the conservation of these species, seeing them as important morphological counterparts to humans which, in the case of their dying out, would cause the demise of their human totemic counterparts. One reason for the decline of cross-river gorillas was believed to be the decline of adhering to these totemic practices among younger people in the 18 to 25 year age range. Regardless, this taboo is still in place and it still strongly discourages hunting of those endangered species. These totemic traditions are believed to be critical to the species' continued survival and well-being. The recurrent revival of these beliefs and practices are seen was a way to reinforce the conservation of these species, especially in the absence of real law enforcement due to a lack of governance. While this could also foster support from different villages and communities, and preserve their culture, care must be taken when selecting these practices as some could encourage their killing. Largely because of many taboos, in the past 15 years, there has not been any Cross River gorilla hunting incidents. The presence of a taboo prohibiting their persecution has been considered an extremely successful local conservation strategy.

A workshop for the conservation of the Cross River gorilla was organized by the Wildlife Conservation Society and the Nigerian Conservation Foundation was held in Nigeria in April 2001. The overall goal of the workshop was to enhance the species' chance for survival because of its rare and distinct features from other western gorillas. The most important outcomes of the workshop were a list of improvements recommended to save the species and also establishing the need for regular meetings between the governments and conservation groups of Cameroon and Nigeria to achieve maximum efficiency in their conservation efforts.

In 2008, the government of Cameroon created the Takamanda National Park on the border of Nigeria and Cameroon as an attempt to protect these gorillas. The park now forms part of an important trans-boundary protected area with Nigeria's Cross River National Park, safeguarding an estimated 115 gorillas — a third of the Cross River gorilla population — along with other rare species. The hope is that the gorillas should be able to move between the Takamanda reserve in Cameroon over the border to Nigeria's Cross River National Park.

The Kagwene Gorilla Sanctuary was created by the Cameroonian government on April 3, 2008 as part of the IUCN's Cross River gorilla action plan. It protects 19.44 km^{2} (7.51 sq mi) of land and is located between the forests of Mbulu and Nijikwa in western Cameroon. It consists of rugged, mountainous terrain and represents the highest altitudinal extent of the Cross River gorilla's distribution, with the highest point at 2,037 metres (6,683 ft) above sea level. Only about half of its land is a prime gorilla habitat, while the rest includes grassland or cultivation not suitable for the species. Due to its sanctuary status, it was expected to be provided with a conservator and eco-guards to enforce wildlife laws within its perimeters.
