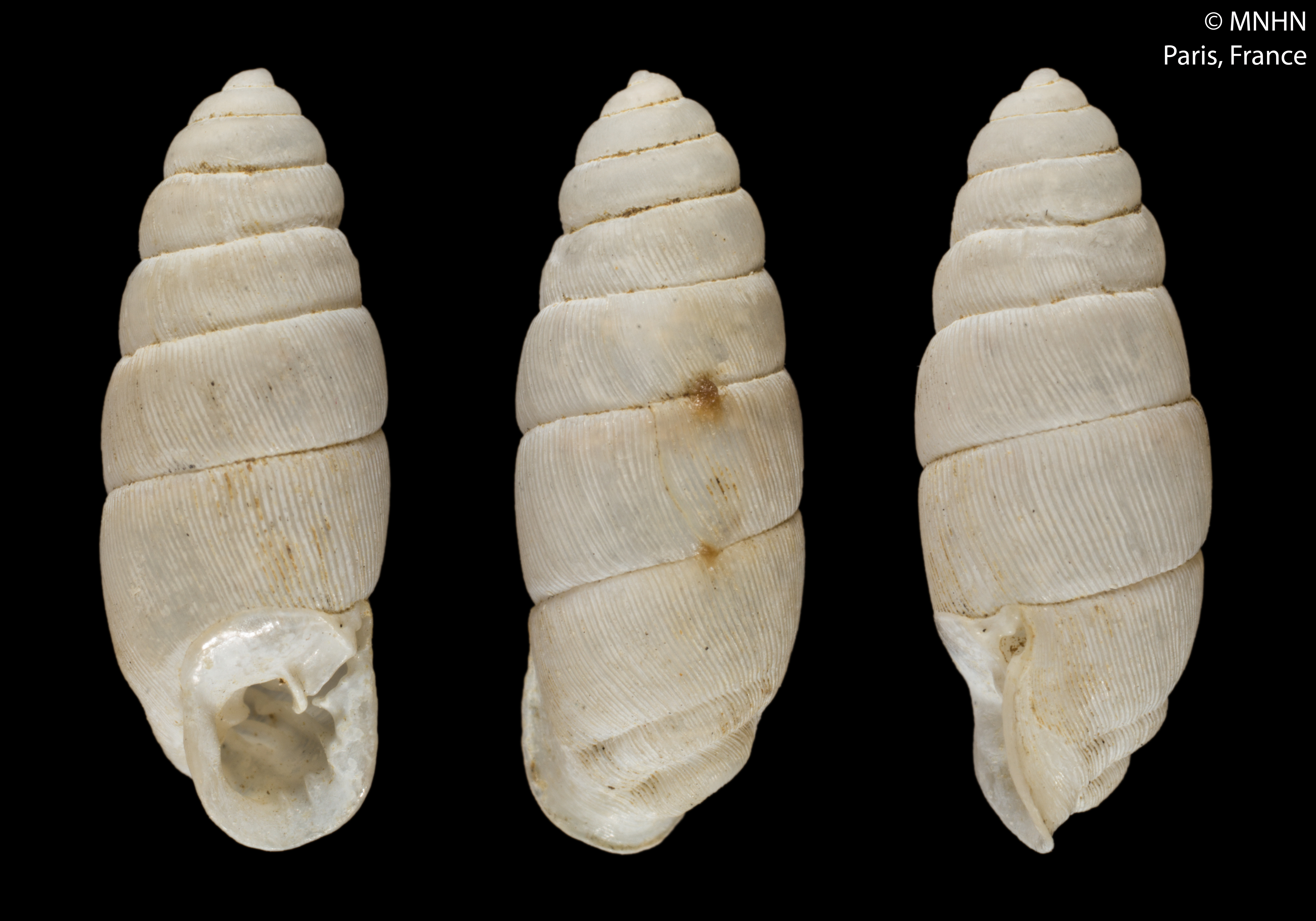
- Shell of Ptychotrema assiniense (syntype at MNHN, Paris)

Scientific classification
- Kingdom: Animalia
- Phylum: Mollusca
- Class: Gastropoda
- Order: Stylommatophora
- Suborder: Achatinina
- Superfamily: Streptaxoidea
- Family: Streptaxidae
- Genus: Ptychotrema; L. Pfeiffer, 1853

Type species
- Bulimus moerchi L. Pfeiffer, 1853

Synonyms
- Adjua Chaper, 1885 (original rank); Carychiopsis E. von Martens, 1895 junior subjective synonym (invalid; not Sandberger, 1872); Ennea H. Adams & A. Adams, 1855; Ennea (Carychiopsis) E. von Martens, 1895 junior homonym (invalid; not Sandberger, 1872); Ennea (Enneastrum) L. Pfeiffer, 1856 junior subjective synonym; Ennea (Excisa) d'Ailly, 1896 (original combination); Ennea (Ptychotrema) L. Pfeiffer, 1853 (inverted precedence of genus and subgenus); Enneastrum L. Pfeiffer, 1856 junior subjective synonym; Haplonepion Pilsbry, 1919; Parennea Pilsbry, 1919; Ptychotrema (Adjua) Chaper, 1885 · alternative representation; Ptychotrema (Aduja) misspelling - incorrect subsequent spelling; Ptychotrema (Ennea) H. Adams & A. Adams, 1855 alternative representation; Ptychotrema (Excisa) d'Ailly, 1896 alternative representation; Ptychotrema (Haplonepion) Pilsbry, 1919 alternative representation; Ptychotrema (Nsendwea) Dupuis & Putzeys, 1923 alternative representation; Ptychotrema (Parennea) Pilsbry, 1919 alternative representation; Ptychotrema (Ptychoon) Pilsbry, 1919 alternative representation; Ptychotrema (Ptychotrema) L. Pfeiffer, 1853 alternative representation; Ptychotrema (Sinistrexcisa) de Winter, Gómez & Prieto, 1999 alternative representation; Pupa (Ennea) H. Adams & A. Adams, 1855 (original rank); Sinistrexcisa de Winter, Gómez & Prieto, 1999; Streptostele (Ptychotrema) L. Pfeiffer, 1853 superseded combination

= Ptychotrema =

Genus of gastropods

Ptychotrema is a genus of air-breathing land snails, terrestrial pulmonate gastropod molluscs in the subfamily Enneinae of the family Streptaxidae.

== Distribution ==
The distribution of the genus Ptychotrema is Afrotropical, and includes:

- Uganda

== Species ==
Species within the genus Ptychotrema include:

- Ptychotrema aequatoriale Pilsbry, 1919
- Ptychotrema bequaerti (Dautzenberg & Germain, 1914)
- Ptychotrema cossyphae van Bruggen, 1989
- Ptychotrema fraterculus Pilsbry, 1919
- Ptychotrema geminatum (Martens, 1895)
- Ptychotrema goossensi (Adam & van Goethem, 1978)
- Ptychotrema kerereense (Adam & van Goethem, 1978)
- Ptychotrema kigeziense (Preston, 1913)
- Ptychotrema mazumbiensis Tattersfield, 1999
- Ptychotrema paradoxulum (Martens, 1895)
- Ptychotrema pelengeense (Adam & van Goethem, 1978)
- Ptychotrema pollonerae Preston, 1913
- Ptychotrema runsoranum (Martens, 1892)
- Ptychotrema silvaticum Pilsbry, 1919
- Ptychotrema usambarense Verdcourt, 1958
