= Kagwene Gorilla Sanctuary =

Protected area in Cameroon

Coordinates: 06°07′15″N 09°45′05″E

The Kagwene Gorilla Sanctuary was proclaimed by the Cameroonian government on April 3, 2008. It protects 19.44 km^{2} (7.51 sq mi) of land, and is located between the Mbulu and Nijikwa forests in Northwest region of Cameroon. It consists of rugged, mountainous terrain and represents the highest altitudinal extent of the Cross River gorilla's distribution, with the highest point at 2,037 metres (6,683 ft) above sea level. Only about half of its land is a prime gorilla habitat, while the rest includes grassland or cultivation not suitable for the species. Due to its sanctuary status, it was expected to be provided with a conservator and eco-guards to enforce wildlife laws within its perimeters.
