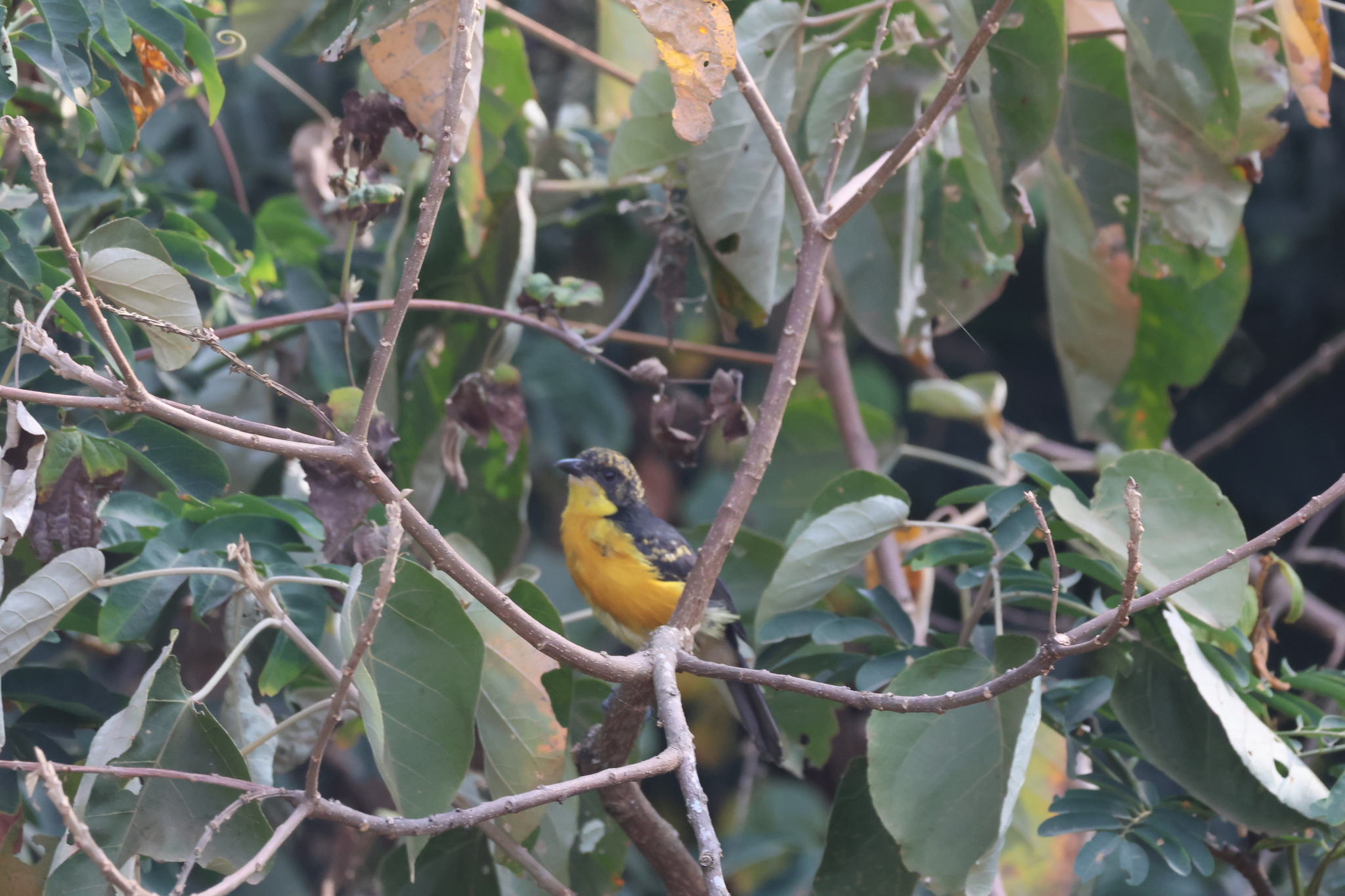

Conservation status
- Least Concern (IUCN 3.1)

Scientific classification
- Kingdom: Animalia
- Phylum: Chordata
- Class: Aves
- Order: Passeriformes
- Family: Malaconotidae
- Genus: Laniarius
- Species: L. atroflavus

Binomial name
- Laniarius atroflavus Shelley, 1887

= Yellow-breasted boubou =

Species of bird

The yellow-breasted boubou (Laniarius atroflavus) is a species of bird in the family Malaconotidae.

== Ecology and distribution ==
It is found in the Cameroonian Highlands forests on Mt. Cameroon and the adjacent Cameroon highlands.

Its natural habitats are subtropical or tropical moist montane forests, subtropical or tropical moist shrubland, and subtropical or tropical high-elevation shrubland. The species is monotypic and sedentary.

== Behaviour ==
=== Breeding ===
November marks the start of the breeding season, which is typically ends in late March. Two eggs are present in the clutch.
