= Takamanda National Park =

National park in Cameroon

Coordinates: 6°10′N 9°20′E

View from Gorilla Rock

The Takamanda National Park is a protected area in Manyu in the Southwest Region of Cameroon, set up in 2008 to help protect the endangered Cross River gorilla.

An older protected area, the Takamanda Forest Reserve, was established in 1934 and covered an area of 675.99 km^{2}.

There are about 43 villages in the park and in 2000 about 16,000 people lived in them.

The park is characterized by great biodiversity, in which various animals live, in addition to several species of monkeys, there are wild pigs, small antelopes and many species of birds.

== Geography ==
The park is located in the South-West Region of Cameroon, along the border with Nigeria. It spans 67,599 hectares of tropical rainforest and river valleys. The nearest major town is Mamfe, which serves as the main gateway to the park. Access is possible via road from Douala or Yaoundé, and through the Mfum–Ekok border crossing from Nigeria.

== Biodiversity ==
Takamanda is home to a remarkable diversity of wildlife, Cross River gorilla the most endangered gorilla subspecies, with only 200–250 individuals remaining.Nigeria-Cameroon chimpanzee an endangered primate vital to the ecosystem. Forest elephant smaller forest-dwelling elephants.Other primates : Drill "Mandrillus leucophaeus"Preuss’s guenon "Cercopithecus preussi", and Red-eared guenon "Cercopithecus erythrotis" Mammals such as red river hog, blue duiker and forest buffalo.

== Conservation ==
The park plays a crucial role in the Takamanda–Mone Landscape Project, which links Takamanda with the Mone River Forest Reserve to create a larger conservation corridor. This initiative is supported by the Wildlife Conservation Society and the IUCN, focusing on gorilla and chimpanzee protection, habitat restoration, and community engagement.

== See also ==
- Cross River Gorilla
