= List of protected areas of Cameroon =

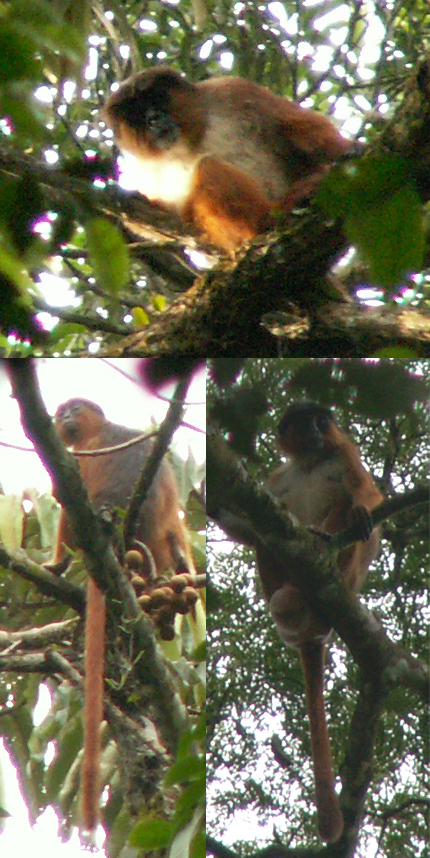
Preuss's red colobus

The protected areas of Cameroon include national parks, wildlife sanctuaries, faunal reserves, and one flora sanctuary. Many protected areas in Cameroon are still in pristine condition, mostly because there is less tourism in Cameroon than other regions of Africa. According to reported statistics, there were ten protected areas from 1932 to 1960. Six protected areas were added between 1960 and 1980, five more were added between 1980 and 2004, and eight protected areas are under consideration within a final approval process.

== National parks ==
Cameroon has over 20 national parks distributed across all ecological zones.

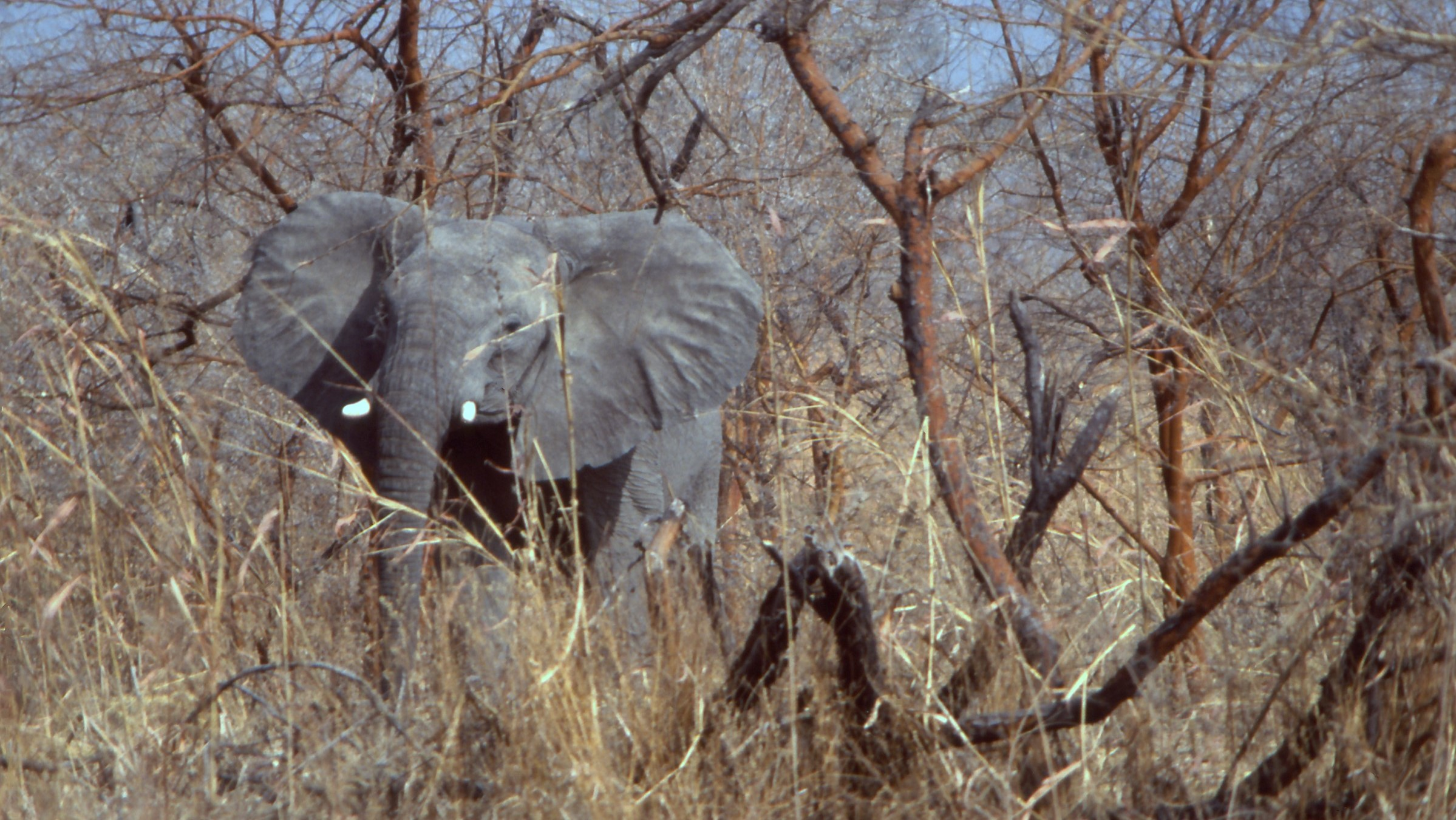
Waza-NP-Elephant

Name	Region	Established	Area (km²)	Coordinates
Waza National Park	Far North	1934	1700	11.3°N 14.7°E
Bénoué National Park	North	1968	1979	7.9°N 13.7°E
Bouba Ndjida National Park	North	1968	2114	8.5°N 14.2°E
Boumba Bek National Park	East	2005	2100	2.2°N 14.4°E
Campo Ma’an National Park	South	2000	2640	2.4°N 10.4°E
Deng Deng National Park	East	2013	687	4.6°N 13.2°E
Douala-Edéa National Park	Littoral	2018	2715	3.8°N 9.7°E
Faro National Park	North	1980	3300	8.3°N 12.8°E
Korup National Park	South West	1986	1260	5.0°N 8.8°E
Lobéké National Park	East	2001	2150	2.1°N 15.7°E
Mbam et Djerem National Park	Centre/Adamawa	2000	4290	6.0°N 12.5°E
Nki National Park	East	2005	3130	2.4°N 14.7°E
Takamanda National Park	South West	2008	627	6.2°N 9.5°E

=== Bénoué National Park ===
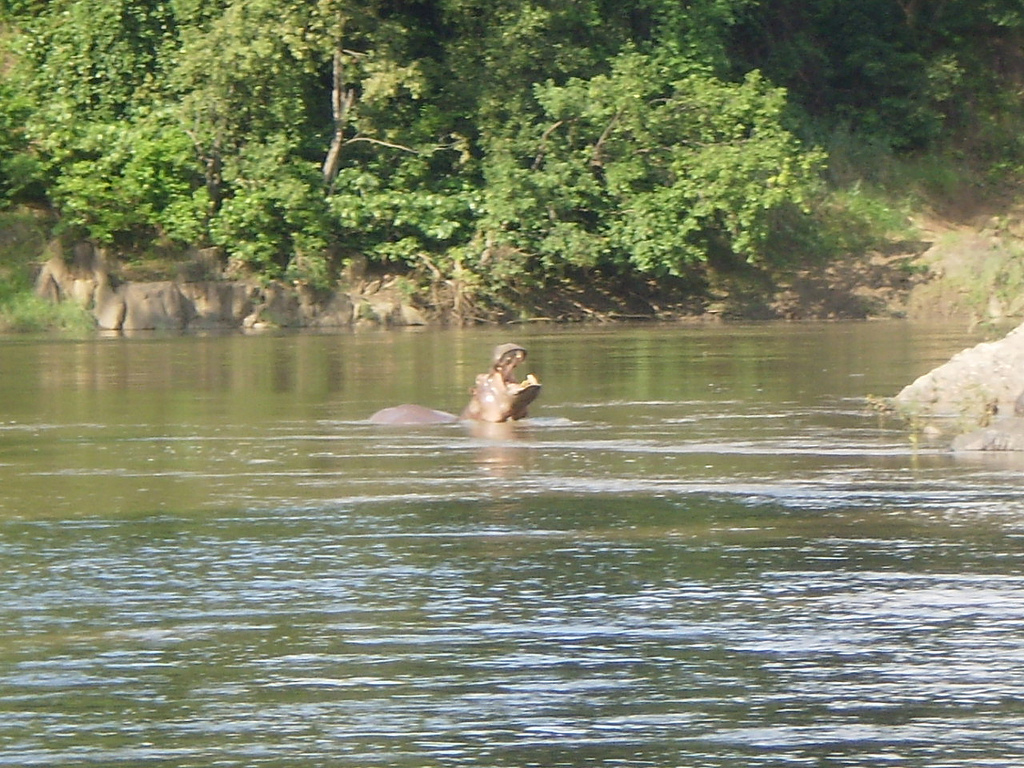
A hippopotamus in the river

Bénoué National Park was first established as a faunal reserve in 1932. It was upgraded to national park status in 1968, and in 1981, it became a biosphere reserve. Its habitat is in the Bénoué savanna belt, a humid savannah woodland area. The park encompasses an area of 180,000 ha (444,790 acres) in size and has a wide frontage to the Bénoué River. The main river flowing through the park is the Bénoué River, which stretches for over 100 km (62 mi), forming the eastern boundary. The park's altitude ranges from 250–760 m (820–2,490 ft) above sea level. The higher elevations are characterized by large rocky massifs, while the undulating plain and forest characterizes the lower sections. Eight hunting reserves, totaling 520,378 ha (1,285,882 acres), surround the park except along the main road. Access to the park from the north is from Ngaoundéré. Wildlife reported from the park consists of elephants, spotted hyena, water buck, warthog, monkeys, large ungulates such as antelope, the Derby eland (Africa's largest antelope), kob, western hartebeest, Lord Derby's eland and waterbuck and buffalo. The African wild dog is also present here. The hippopotamus colonies and crocodile are common in the rivers. As an Important Bird Area according to recent surveys 306 species have been identified. In the dry season, sandbars exposed by fluctuating levels of the sandy Bénoué River provide habitat for plover and other waterbirds.

=== Bouba Njida National Park ===
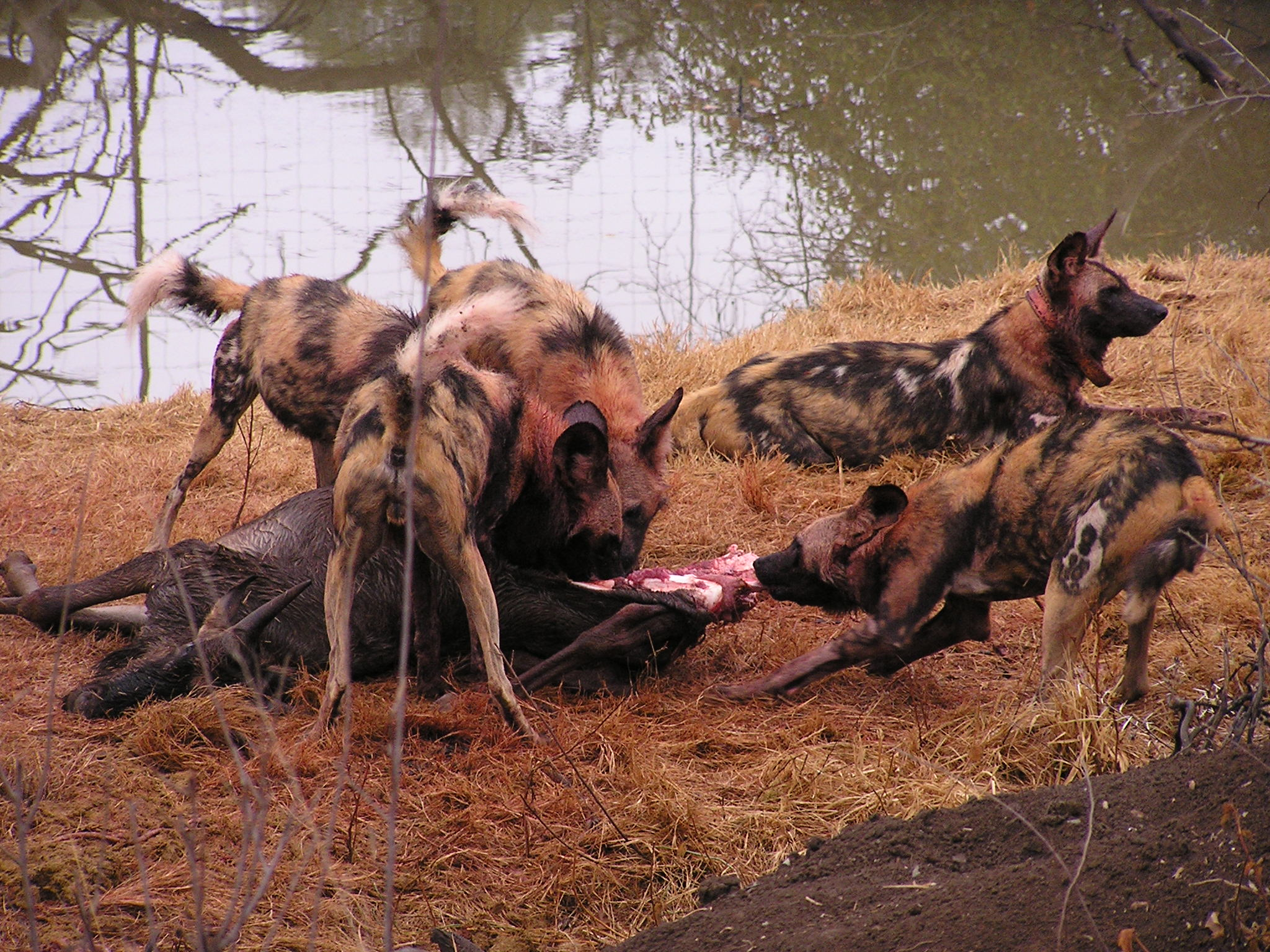
African painted wild dogs

Bouba Njida National Park covers an area of 220,000 hectares (540,000 acres). Initially it was established as a reserve in 1932. It was upgraded to level of park in 1980. The park is reported habitat is of savannah forest and the average elevation varies from 251 to 864 m. The park receives an average annual rainfall of 1082 mm. The park is categorized under IUCN II. The painted hunting dog (Lycaon pictus) considered critically endangered by IUCN has a count of 60 within Cameroon and they are reported from this park apart from two other national parks in the country. A total of 23 antelope species occur in the park. A serious problem of elephant poaching by Sudanese from across the border through Chad has been reported in February 2012 to the extent of nearly 450 elephants killed out of a total population of about 600 in the park. To combat this problem, Cameroon has deployed helicopters and 600 soldiers to control elephant poaching in its parks.

=== Boumba Bek National Park ===
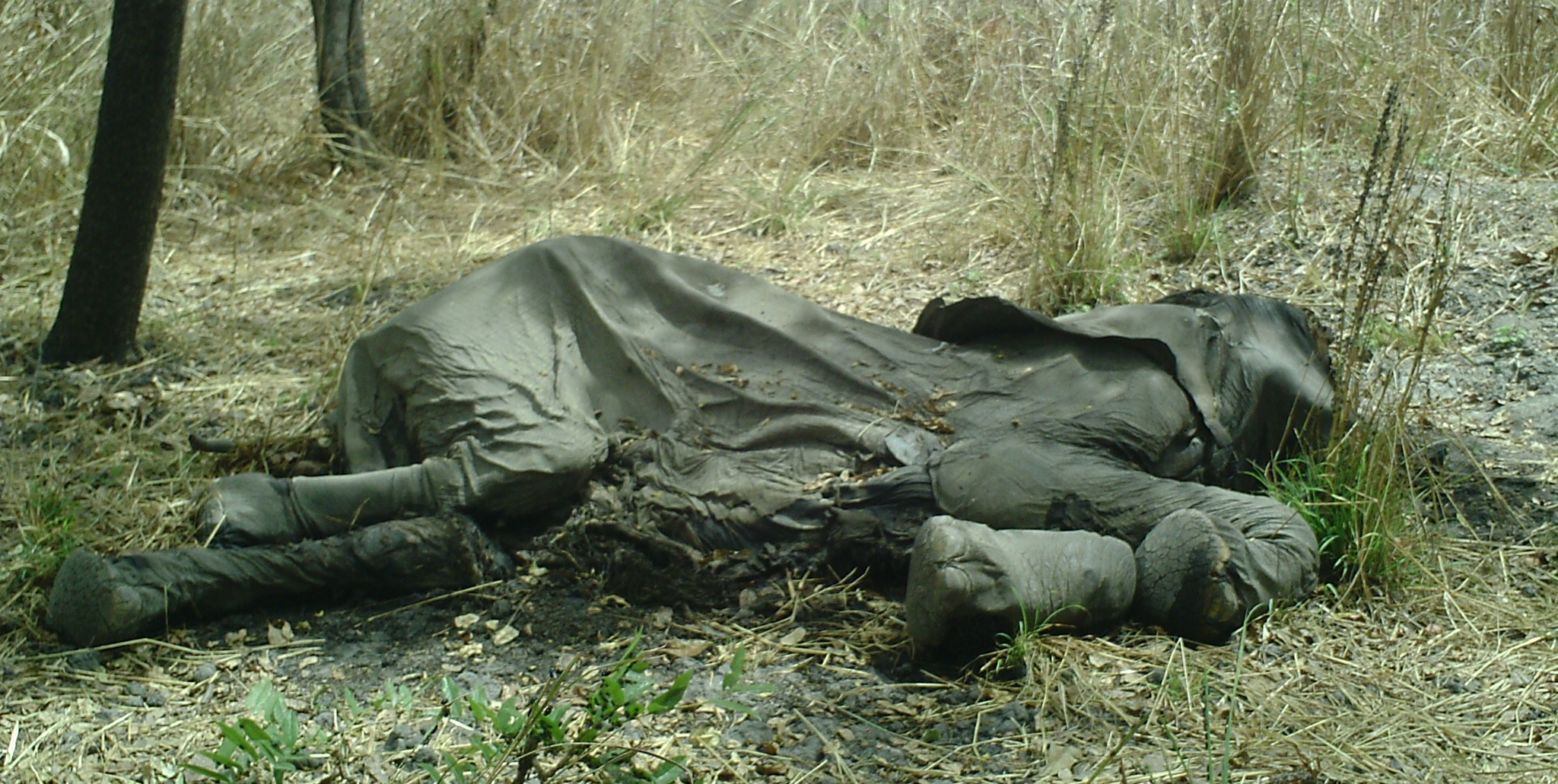
Poached elephant carcass in Bouba Njida National Park in Cameroon.

Boumba Bek National Park encompasses an area of 210,000 hectares (520,000 acres). In 1995, the park was named an Essential Protection Zone and on 17 October 2005 it was declared a national park. The park lies between the Boumba and Bek Rivers in southeast Cameroon, from which it derives its name. The park has a tropical climate with temperature ranging from 23.1 to 25˚C with an average annual temperature of 24˚C. Its relative humidity varies between 60 and 90% while annual rainfall is 1500 mm per year. It encompasses a rich biodiversity of plants and animals. The habitat consists of evergreen lowland rainforest, along with several patches of closed-canopy evergreen forest. Elephant density of 2.5 km^{2} in the park is reported to be one of the highest. However poaching for elephant ivory and meat are taking their toll in the park area. 300 fish species are also reported. Endangered gorillas are reported from the park. 280 bird species are reported in the park including the rare Dja warbler.

=== Campo Ma'an National Park ===
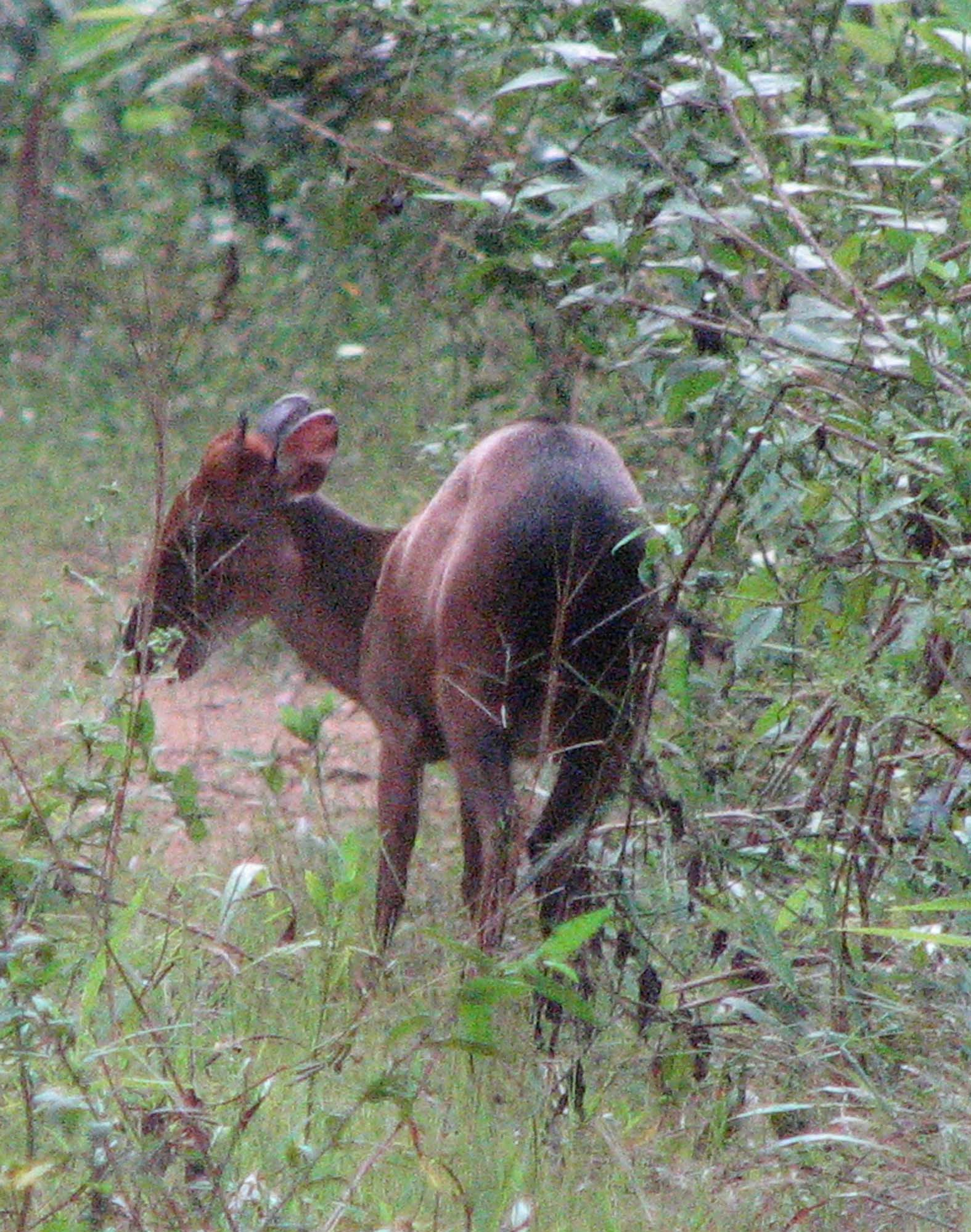
A Peters's duiker antelope

Campo Ma'an National Park covers an area of 264,064 hectare and was established in 2000. The combined area for the national park and the buffer zone surrounding the park is approximately 700,000 hectares. The Campo Wildlife Reserve established in 1932 and the Ma’an Production Reserve set up in 1980 were combined to form this park in the year 2000 as a compensation for the damage caused to the ecosystem due laying of the oil pipe line in Cameroon. The park area includes four logging concessions, an agro-forestry zone, and an agro-industrial zone known for rubber and palms. The biodiversity of the area has wide range of plants and animals species including several taxonomic endemics. The mammal species reported are 87 including elephants, lowland gorillas, chimpanzees, hippos, giant pangolins, black colobus, mandrills and leopards. Reptile species reported are 127, and fish species are 250. It is also one of the 33 Bird Identified Areas (BIAs) in the south western corner of Cameroon, bordering with Equatorial Guinea on the south and the Atlantic Ocean to its west and has 302 bird species. The park is subject to many threats to its ecosystem mainly due to logging, poaching, agricultural activities and coastal development

=== Douala Edéa National Park ===
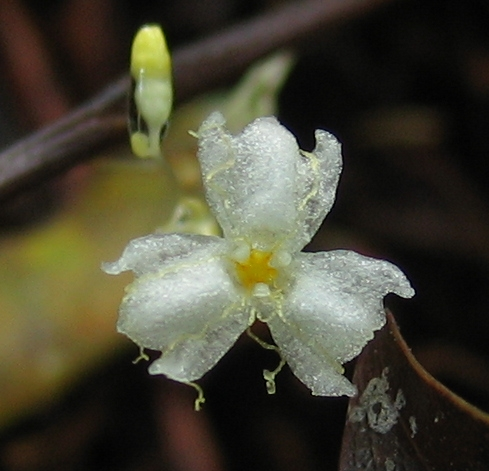
Gymnosiphon longistylus.

Douala Edéa National Park is located in the Littoral Region of Cameroon, on either side of the mouth of the Sanaga River on the shore of the Bight of Biafra, opposite the island of Bioko. The reserve was established in 1932. As of 2000, it covered 160,000 hectares (400,000 acres). Cameroon designated the reserve as a wildlife park for scientific purposes in 1971, Lake Tissongo, a lagoon connected to the south bank of the Sanaga river by a 5 kilometres (3.1 mi) tidal channel, is included in the park. 80% of the reserve is covered by tropical lowland equatorial forest, and 15% by Atlantic mangrove forests. Fauna include forest elephants, primates (chimpanzees, monkey species such as black colobus), antelopes (sitatunga, blue duiker, etc.), West African manatees, sea turtles, dolphins, crocodiles, alligator, many fish species, terrestrial and water bird species. The red-capped mangabey was reported to be common in the reserve in 1972. The endangered red-eared nose-spotted guenon was reported in the Lombé part of the park in densities of 2-3 groups per square kilometers, but populations had dropped elsewhere due to hunting.

=== Faro National Park ===
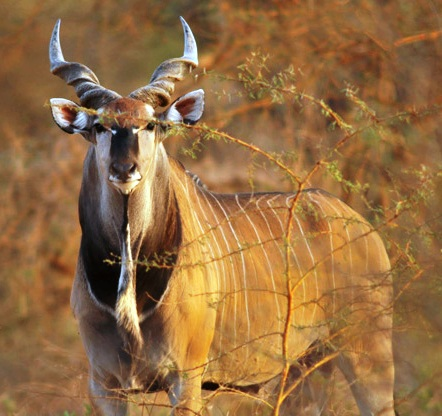
Giant eland (Taurotragus derbianus derbianus)

Faro National Park covers an area of 330,000 hectares (820,000 acres). Initially it was established as a reserve in 1947. It was upgraded to level of park in 1968. Its habitat consists largely of Sudanian savanna in topography with elevation between 250 m and 500 m. It is close to the Nigerian border, surrounded on the eastern side by several hunting reserves. Plant species reported are 243 species with more of Sudan–Guinea Savanna biome species. It is home to cheetahs, elephants, and is known for its colonies of hippopotamuses. It used to house the last representatives of the western subspecies of the black rhinoceros, but this species is now considered extirpated from the area, and extinct. Mammals also reported by IUCN include Taurotragus derbianus and Damaliscus lunatus korrigum (VU), and a few Loxodonta africana (EN).

=== Korup National Park ===
Korup National Park covers an area of 126,000 hectares (310,000 acres). It was a reserve in 1962 which was upgraded to the status of a park in 1982. The park is located on the western border of Cameroon. Its habitat covers lowland rainforest which is biologically very diverse. Also included are swamp forests, a small area of secondary forests and sub-montane forest of the Mount Juahan (highest mountain in the park). Botanical and mycological inventory has been carried out. The average annual rainfall reported for the park is over 5,000 millimetres (200 in) and the average temperature is 27 °C (81 °F) with average humidity of 86%. It is rich in biodiversity of plants, animals and fungi. Plants reported are 400 tree species, which includes ectomycorrhizal and ceaesalpinaceous legumes. Undergrowth is not dense in the canopy forest areas. The park survey has revealed 76 poroid basidiomycetes of fungi. Plant species reported include 480 species of herbs. The park has a unique record of more than 400 species of birds, 82 reptiles, 92 amphibians, and about 1000 species of butterflies. Aquafauna consists of 130 different fish species and mammal species are over 160.

=== Lobéké National Park ===
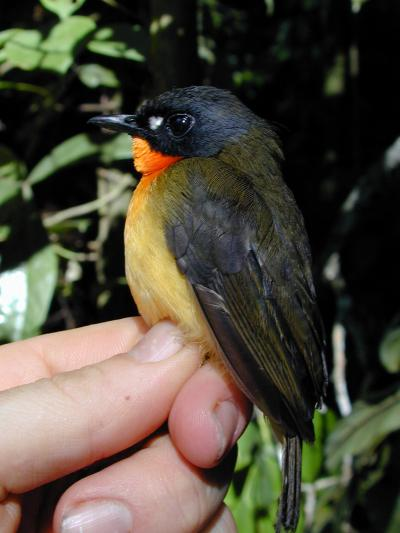
The forest robin Stiphrornis pyrrholaemus.

Lobéké National Park established in 2000 covers an area of 43,000 hectares (110,000 acres). The park is within the Moloundou Arrondissement of East Province, is in the Congo Basin. It is bordered on the east by the Sangha River forming Cameroon's international border with Central African Republic and the Republic of the Congo. Forests in the park have never been logged. Semi-evergreen dominate the area. The natural savannas found here are a few saline swamps only and they are bordered normally by palm thickets (Phoenix or Raphia on wetter ground) with large areas of sedge marshes (Rhynchospora corymbosa). The dominant species reported are Sterculiaceae (Triplochiton, Pterygota), Ceiba pentandra and Terminalia superba. The canopy is mostly open with understorey consisting of thick Marantaceae–Zingiberaceae thicket or a closed 6–8 m tall layer of Ebenaceae and Annonaceae trees. The streams have some small patches of closed, evergreen Gilbertiodendron dewevrei forest on its banks. The sandbars on the Sangha River are habitats for waders and pratincoles during the dry months. Birds reported by IBS total 305 species; Bradypterus grandis is the most important and is found in Rhynchospora marsh and has a density of 1 pair per ha area of the park. Mammals reported are Loxodonta africana (EN), Tragelaphus euryceros, duikers Gorilla gorilla (EN) and Pan troglodytes (EN).

=== Nki National Park ===
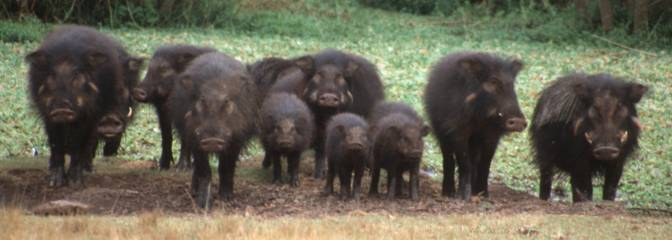
Hylochoerus meinertzhageni

Nki National Park, in the southeast of Cameroon bordering Congo, was established as a national park covering aan area of - ha in 2000. The Dja River provides the main access to the park. The park has not been logged due to difficulty of access. Semi-evergreen forest is dominant forest type and has an open canopy with Triplochiton trees of 50–60 m; closed evergreen forests are seen in large areas between the canopy forests. Saline swamps and a few ephemeral flooded areas with Uapaca forests are found along the Dja River. The topography is hilly with elevation varying from 350 - 650m. The park has remained an untouched part of the Congo basin forest and a visitor to the park had called it "the last true wilderness". The flat and grass-covered terrain of the park is extensively inhabited by herds of buffalo, elephants, bongos and sitatungas. Other mammal species reported are: Myosciurus pumilio (VU) (a Lower Guinea endemic), Hylochoerus meinertzhageni, Loxodonta africana, Gorilla gorilla, Pan troglodytes (all EN), forest elephants, chimpanzees, and antelopes. Avifauna species reported by IBA are 265 species which include Bradypterus grandis (in Rhynchospora marsh), Glaucidium sjostedti, Glaucidium capense, Caprimulgus batesi, binotatus and yellow-bellied form of the forest robin Stiphrornis erythrothorax.

=== Waza National Park ===
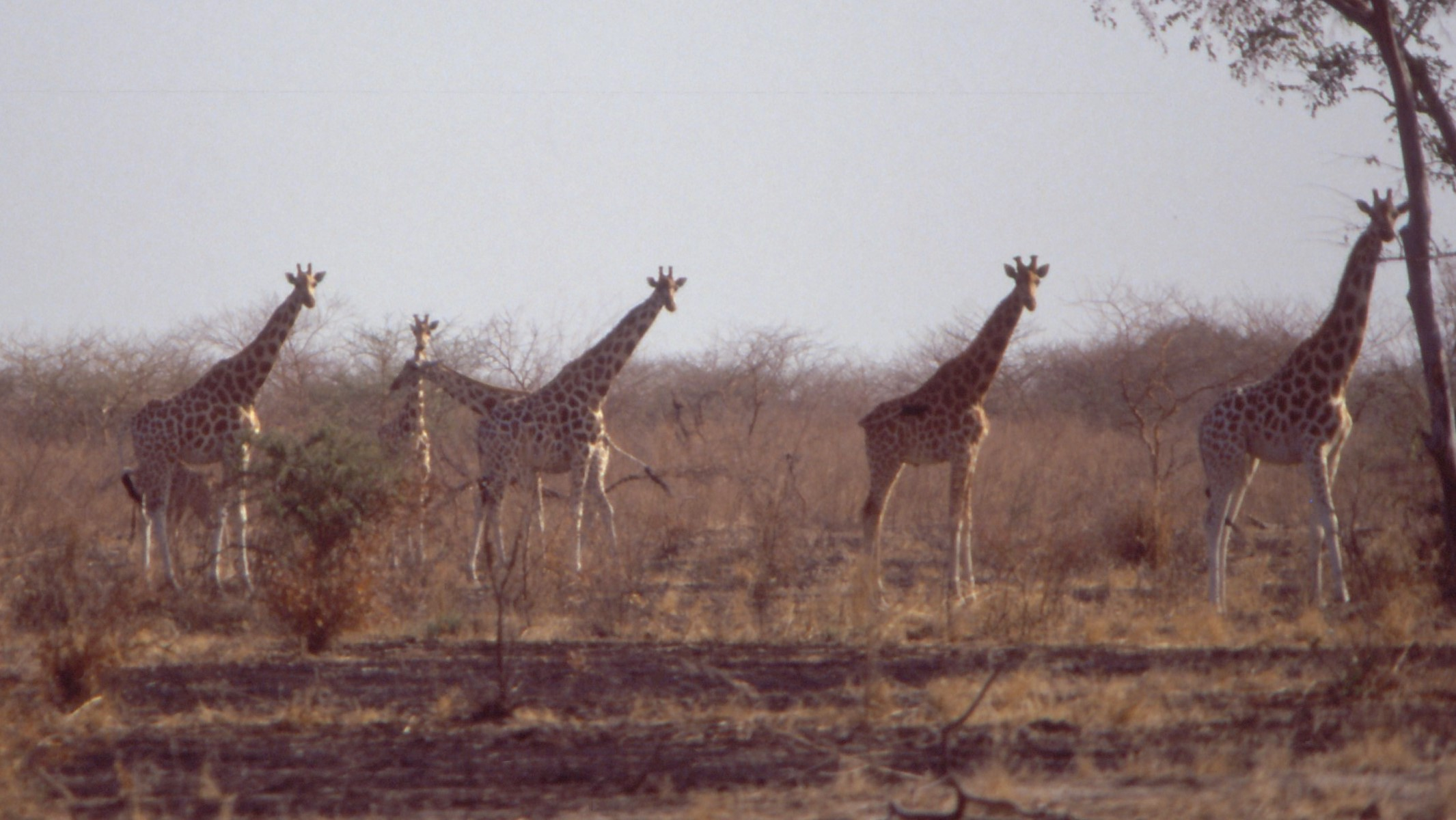
Giraffes in Waza National Park.

Waza National Park covers an area of 170,000 hectares (420,000 acres) and was established as a park in 1968 in the Far-North Province of Cameroon. It was established as the Waza Reserve on 24 March 1934, initially covering an area of 155,000 hectares (380,000 acres) which was extended in 1935 to cover 165,000 hectares (410,000 acres). It is reported to be one of the best parks in the Francophone countries of Africa UNESCO inscribed it as a biosphere in 1982 and for its preservation and conservation a Management Master Plan was drawn up in 1997. The park's habitat is mainly in the "Chad depression" with average elevation in the range of a 300 to 320 m (highest ground goes up to 500m) in arid climatic conditions with average annual precipitation of 700mm and mean annual temperature of 28 °C. With this setting the vegetation types which cover the park are categorized under five broad types of open combretaceous shrub savanna, Anogeissus leiocarpus woodland, Lannea humilis open grass savanna, Acacia seyal tree savanna and Yaéré floodplains with perennial grasses. In the desert conditions with now streams flowing through the park area there are no perennial grasses in the park.

The faunal species reported from the park are giraffe Giraffa camelopardalis, elephant Loxodonta africana, aardvark Orycteropus afer, warthog Phacochoerus aethiopicus, hyena Hyaena hyaena, lion Panthera leo, red-fronted gazelle Gazella rufifrons, waterbuck Kobus ellipsiprymnus, kob Kobus kob, topi Damaliscus lunatus, roan antelope Hippotragus equinus, impala Aepyceros melampus, vervet monkey Cercopithecus aethiops, patas monkey Erythrocebus patas, olive baboon Papio anubis, leopard Panthera pardus, and cheetah Acinonyx jubatus. Avifauna reported are also substantial and some of the important species are: areostrich Struthio camelus, ground hornbill Bucorvus abyssinicus, bateleur Terathopius ecaudatus, white-faced tree duck Dendrocygna arborea, Abyssinian roller Coracias abyssinica, standard-winged nightjar Macrodipteryx longipennis and guinea fowl Numida meleagris.

=== Proposed national parks ===
Eight national parks have been proposed but not yet established:

- Ebo National Park (1,417 km^{2})
- Ma Mbed Mbed National Park (142 km^{2}), proposed 2004
- Kalamaloué National Park (67 km^{2})
- Kom National Park (678.39 km^{2})
- Manyange na Elombo-Campo National Park (1,103 km^{2}), proposed 2007
- Mefou National Park (11 km^{2}), proposed 2000
- Mozogo Gokoro National Park (17 km^{2}), proposed 1968
- Ndongere National Park (2,344 km^{2}), proposed 2005

== Wildlife sanctuaries ==
Cameroon has four wildlife sanctuaries (IUCN category IV), and one proposed wildlife sanctuary:

- Mengame Wildlife Sanctuary (267 km^{2}), est. 2008
- Bayang-Mbo Wildlife Sanctuary (663 km^{2}), est. 1996

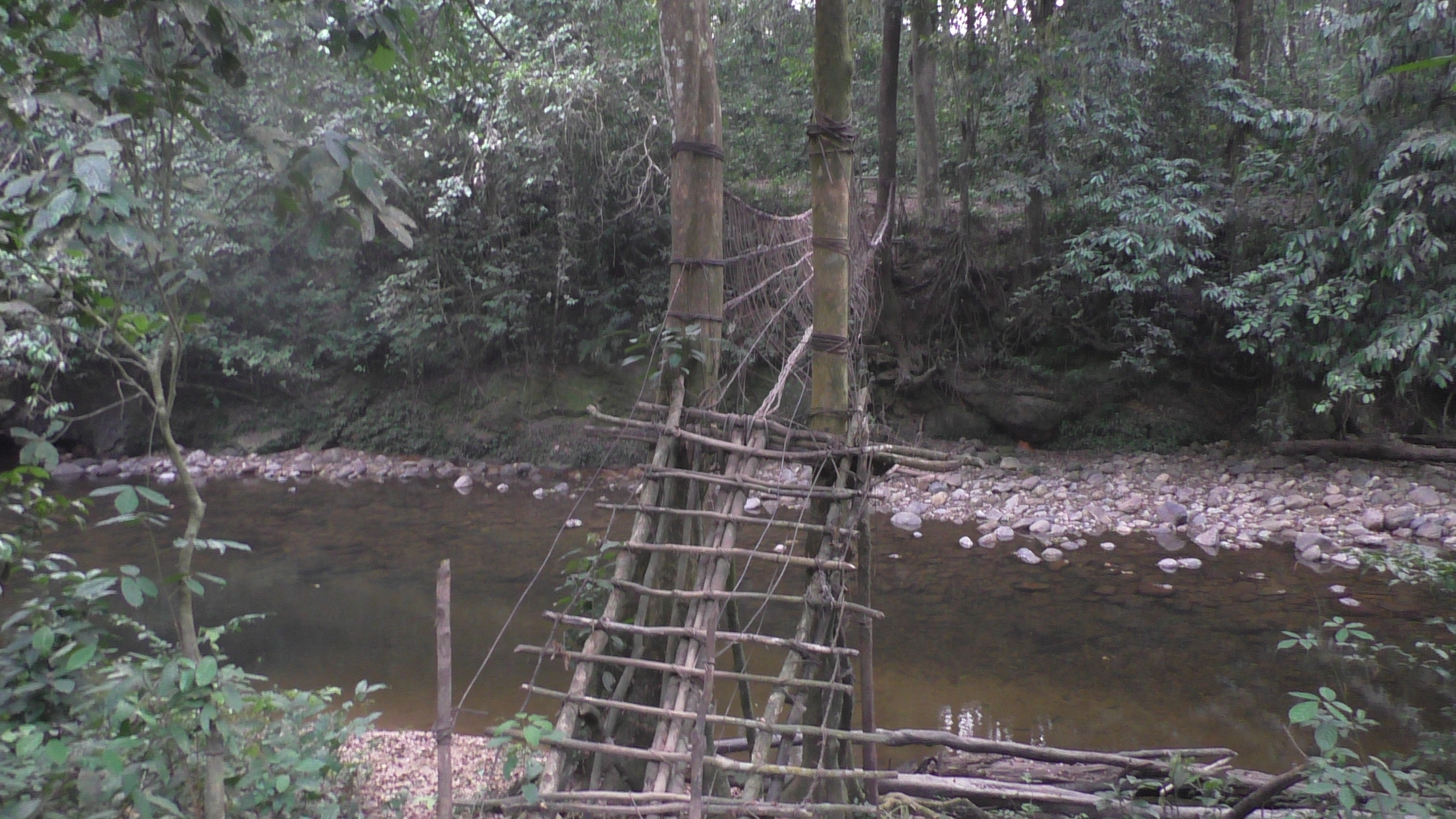
A cross bridge in the Mbayang Mbo Wildlife Sanctuary

- Kagwene Wildlife Sanctuary (19 km^{2}), est. 2008
- Tofala Hill Wildlife Sanctuary (1,566 km^{2}), est. 2014

=== Proposed wildlife sanctuaries ===
- Rumpi Hills Wildlife Sanctuary (452 km^{2})

== Faunal reserves ==
Cameroon has four faunal reserves (IUCN category IV):

- Dja Faunal Reserve (5,266 km^{2}), est. 2007
- Lake Ossa Faunal Reserve (45 km^{2})
- Ngoyla Faunal Reserve (1,566 km^{2}), est. 2014
- Santchou Faunal Reserve (95 km^{2}), est. 1987

=== Dja Faunal Reserve ===
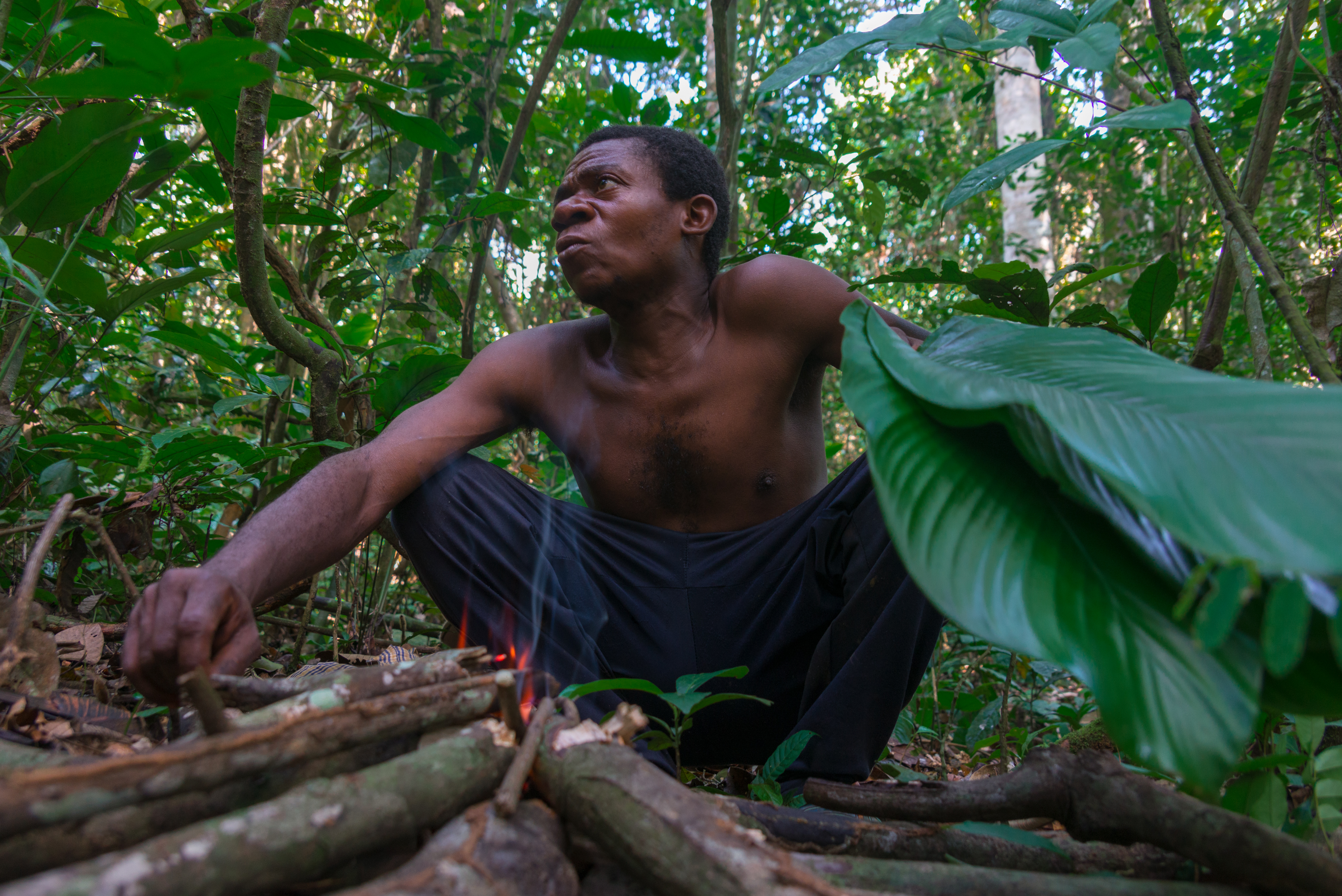
Baka Chief in Dja Faunal Reserve

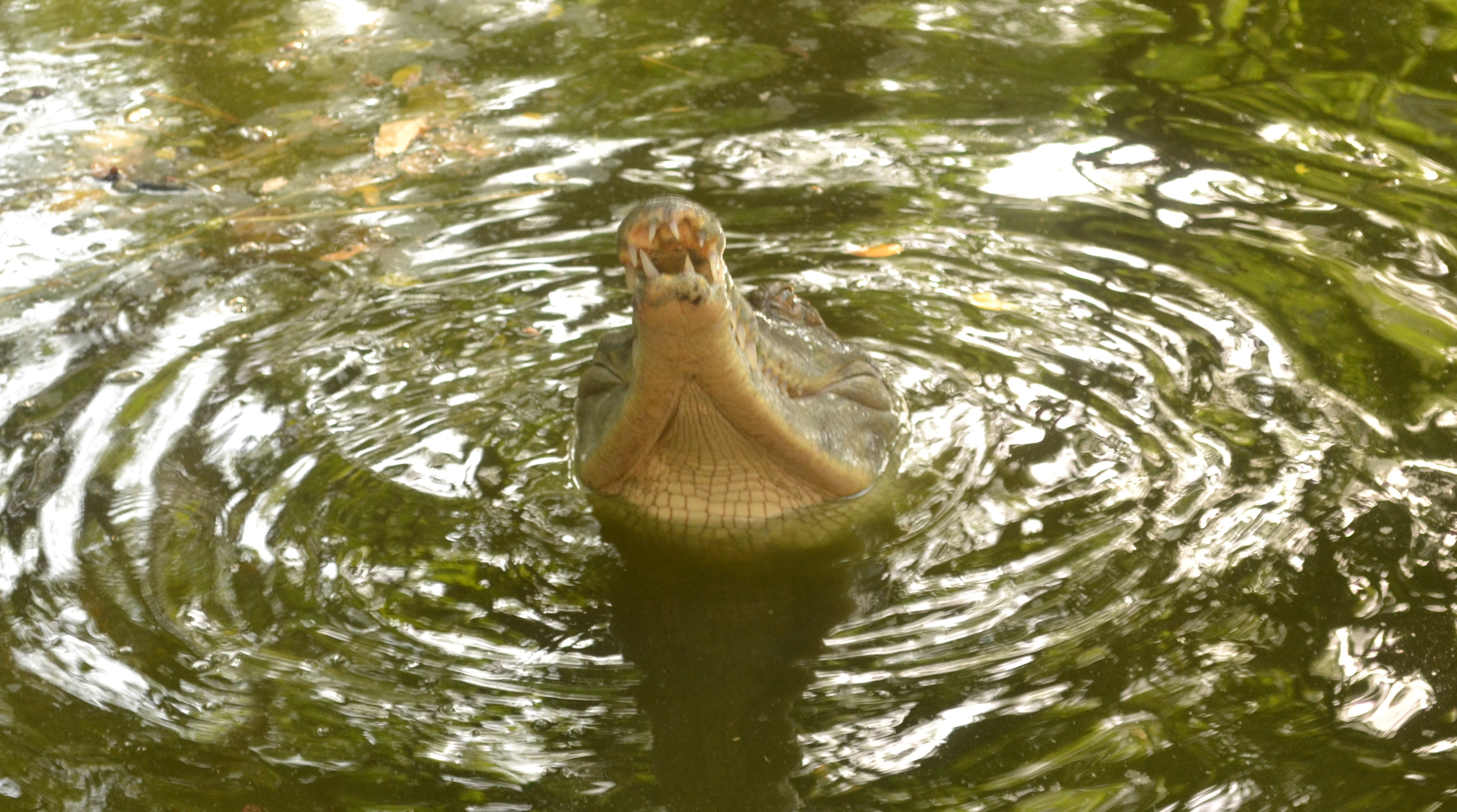
Slender-snouted crocodile

Dja Faunal Reserve was established as a faunal reserve in 1950. It was designated by UNESCO as a World Heritage Site in 1987 under Natural Criteria ix and x, on account of the diversity of species present in the reserve. The Dja River surrounds the reserve on most of its border, except in the northeast. In 1981 it was designated a biosphere reserve under the UNESCO Man & Biosphere Programme covering an area of 526,000 ha. It has a topography with elevation varying between 400 m and 800 m with climate of equatorial type and with average annual precipitation of about 1,570mm. It has dense rain forests and is integral part of the Congo Basin. It is reported as the largest and best-protected of rainforests in Africa with 90 percent preserved in pristine condition mostly due to its difficult accessibility. There are more than 1,500 known plant (canopy of 30-40m rising to 60m) species in the reserve, over 107 mammals including five threatened species and more than 320 bird species in the reserve. The forest canopy consists of 43 tree species. It is well known for its biodiversity and a wide variety of primates such as western lowland gorilla Gorilla gorilla (CR) and western chimpanzee (Pan troglodytes) with total reported species of more than 4000. As an Important Bird Area recognised by the BirdLife International, the 1993 inventory records avifauna of 349 resident species and also more than 80 species of regular migrants. Bates's weaver (EN) Ploceus batesi is endemic to southern Cameroon and African grey parrot Psittacus erithacus is on, lizard and two species of crocodile one of which is the African slender-snouted crocodile Crocodylus cataphractus. There are 60 fish species of which only one is endemic.

== Flora sanctuary ==
Cameroon has one flora sanctuary (IUCN category IV)

- Kilum Ijim, Mont Oku Flora Sanctuary (10 km^{2}), est. 2004

== Transboundary protected areas and biosphere reserves ==
Five transboundary protected areas cover portions of Cameroon and neighboring countries.

- Sangha Trinational is a transboundary conservation complex that includes Lobéké National Park in Cameroon, Dzanga-Ndoki National Park in the Central African Republic, and Nouabalé-Ndoki National Park in the Republic of the Congo. The three national parks protect an area of 7,463 square kilometres (2,881 sq mi). A buffer zone of 17,880 square kilometres (6,900 sq mi) includes portions of all three countries. Sangha Trinational was designated a UNESCO World Heritage Site in 2012.
- Campo Ma'an National Park of 3,000 square kilometres (1,200 sq mi) borders on Rio Campo Natural Reserve in Equatorial Guinea.
- Kalamaloué National Park adjoins Mandelia Faunal Reserve in Chad and Chad Basin National Park in Nigeria.
- Faro National Park and Tchabal Mbabo National Park adjoin Nigeria's Gashaka-Gumti National Park and Kamatan, Kurmin Danki, and Seri areas.
- Korup National Park, Takamanda National Park, and Lake Ejagham adjoin Nigeria's Cross River National Park.

Cameroon has three UNESCO-recognized biosphere reserves, Waza National Park, designated 1979, Benoué, designated in 1981, and Dja Faunal Reserve, designated in 1981.

== History ==
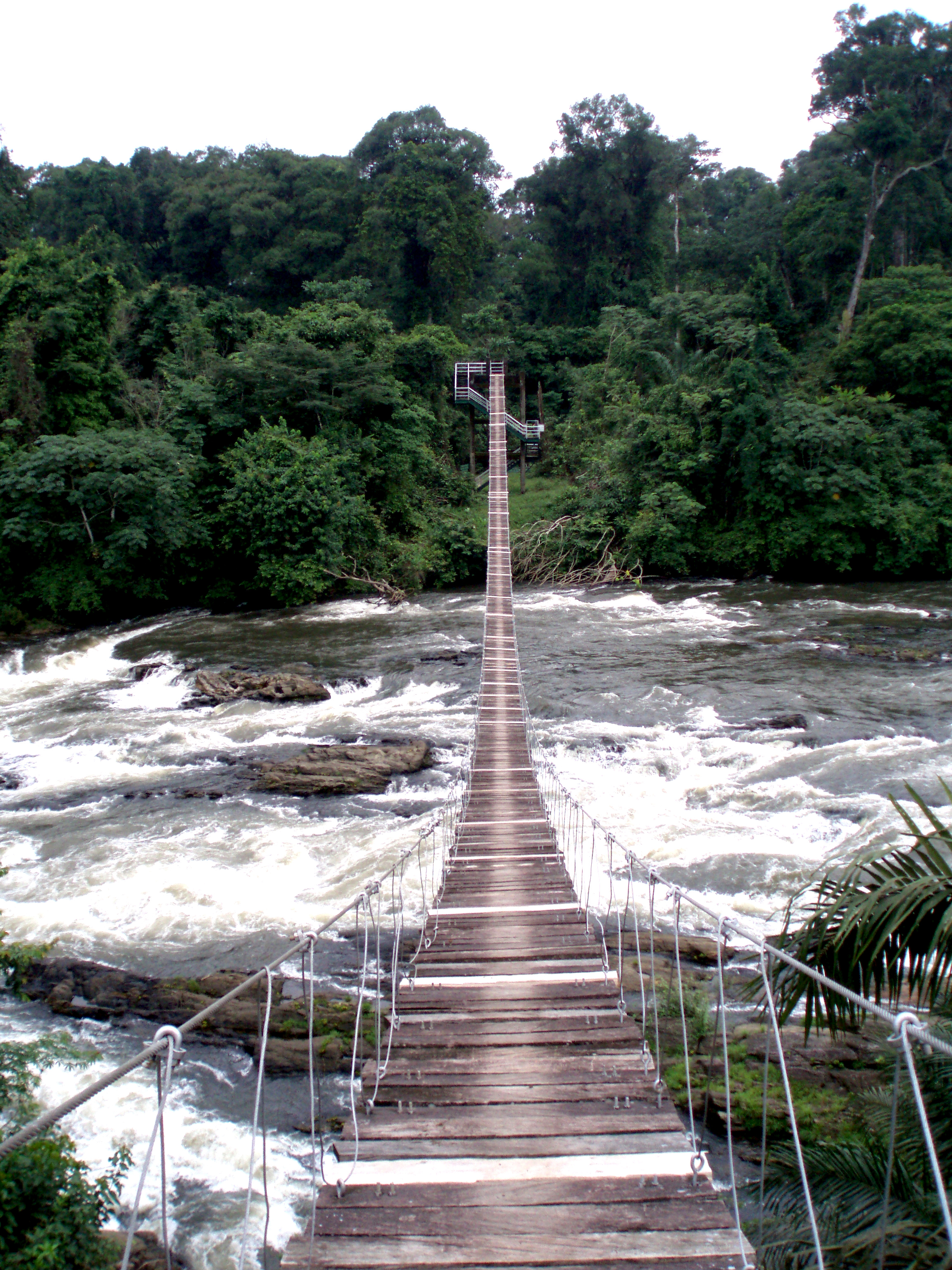
Korup became a national park in 1982.

Cameroon's first protected area in the northern part of the country was established in 1932 by the colonial administration of French Cameroon. The first forest reserve created was the Mozogo Gokoro Reserve on 12 June 1932 and the second in the same year was the Benue Reserve on 19 November 1932. The third reserve, the Waza Reserve was established on 24 March 1934, initially covering an area of 155,000 hectares (380,000 acres) which was extended in 1935 to cover 165,000 hectares (410,000 acres); this is one of the most popular reserves in the country.

Cameroon became independent in 1960, and the national government retained the country's system of protected areas, and designated new ones. Until 1975, there were 9 protected areas with greater focus on the north than the south. Following the Earth Summit of Rio de Janeiro in Brazil in 1992, the number of protected areas increased substantially and were well distributed covering all the ten provinces of the country in widely differing topographic, climatic, hydrological and biological conditions. There are 20 protected reserves which include national parks, zoos, forest reserves and sanctuaries.

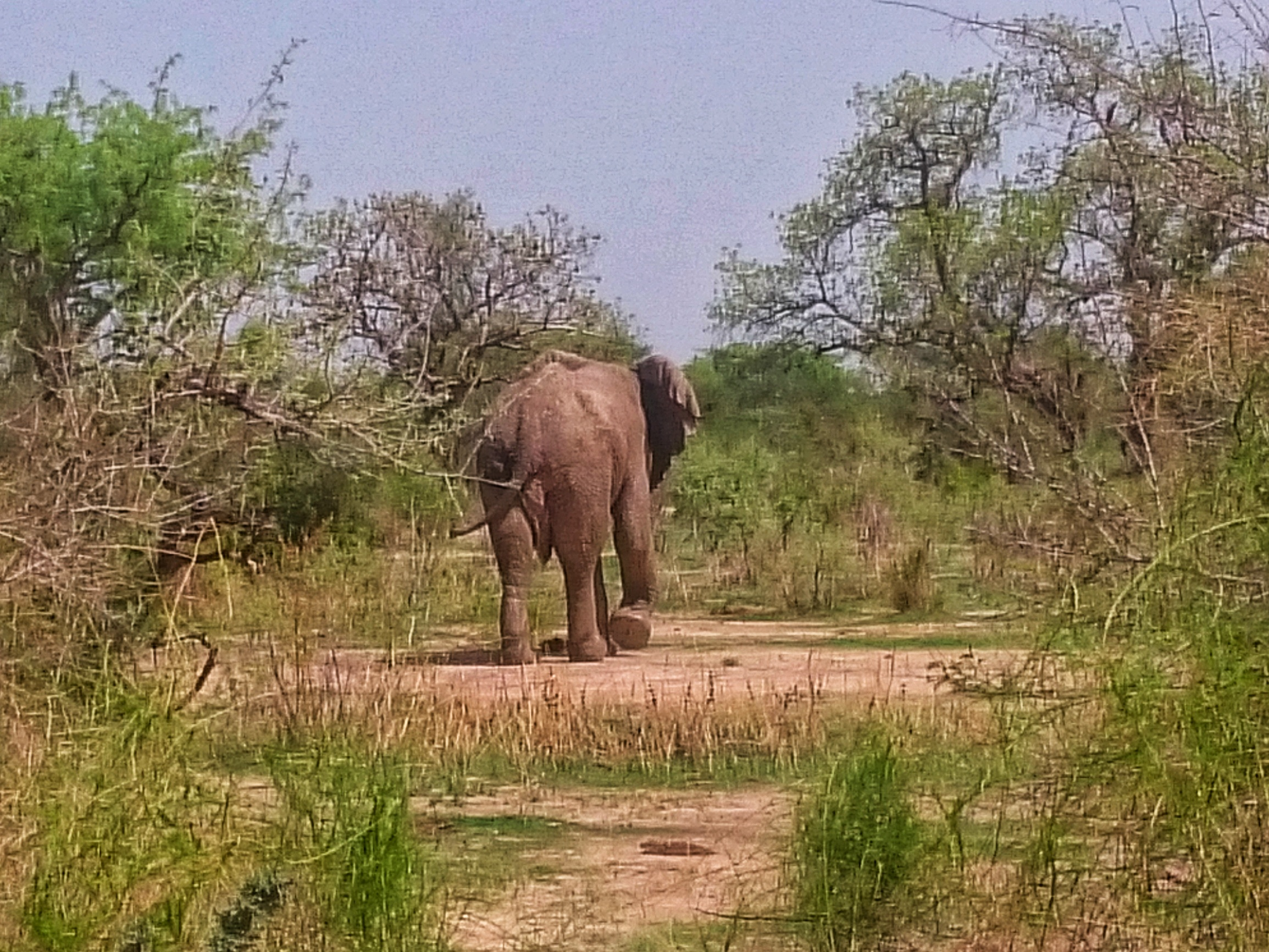
Elephant at Kalfou Reserve

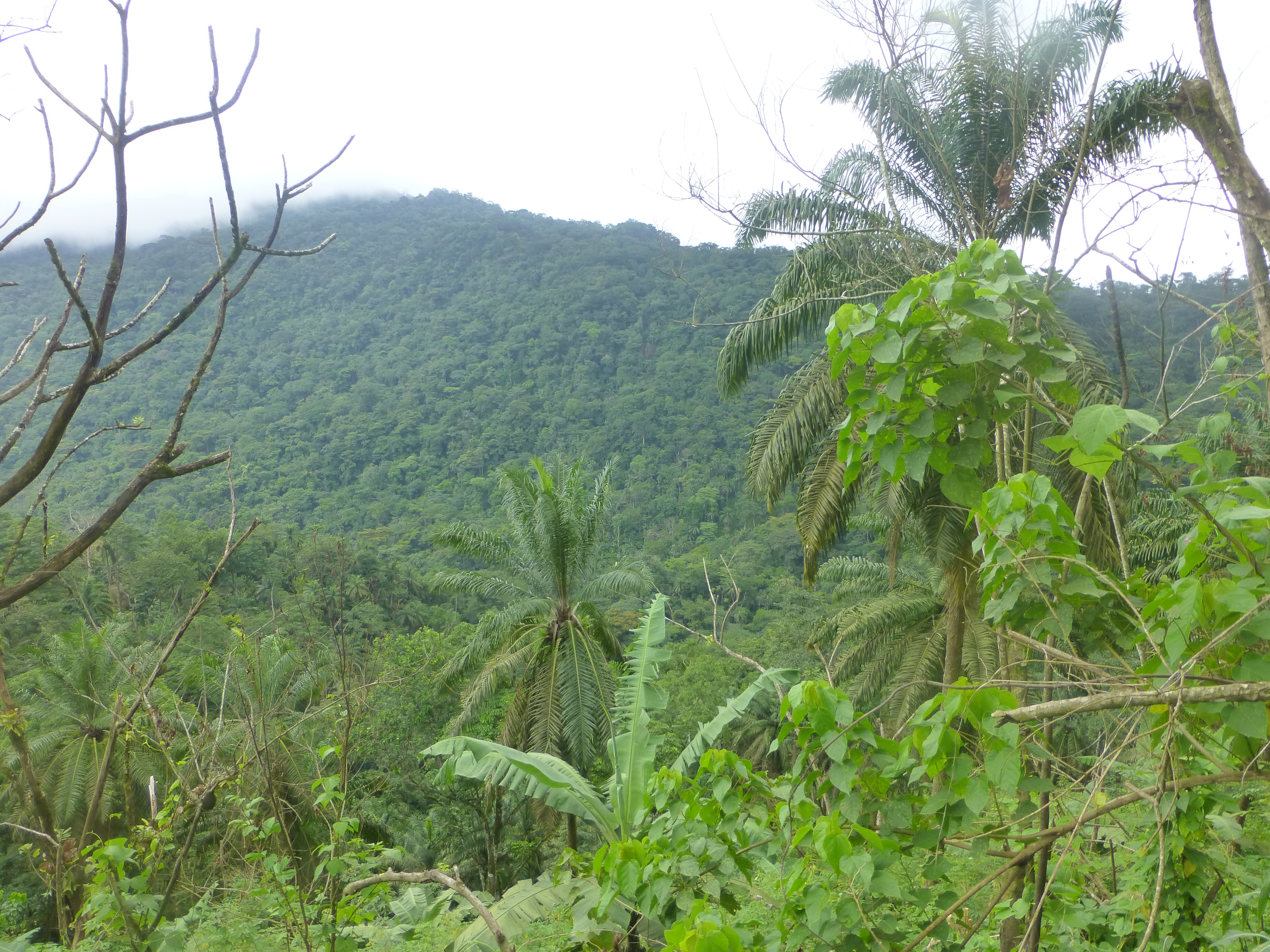
Wide view of Mbayang Game Sanctuary

The historical record of creation of various national parks/reserves (the figures in parentheses indicate first date of establishment as a reserve and the second date indicates conversion into the park) are:

- Waza National Park 170,000 hectares (420,000 acres) (1934/-)
- Kalamaloue National Park 4,500 hectares (11,000 acres) (1947–1972)
- Mozogo-Gokoro National Park 1,400 hectares (3,500 acres) (1932–1970)
- Benue National Park 180,000 hectares (440,000 acres) (1932–1968)
- Faro National Park 330,000 hectares (820,000 acres) (1932–1980)
- Bouba.Ndjida National Park 220,000 hectares (540,000 acres) (1947–1968)
- Korup National Park 126,000 hectares (310,000 acres) (1962/ 1982)
- Dja Reserve 526,000 hectares (1,300,000 acres) (1950)
- Douala Edea Wildlife Reserve 160,000 hectares (400,000 acres), in the Littoral area (1932)
- Lobeke Wildlife Park 43,000 hectares (110,000 acres) in 2000
- Campo Wildlife Park 271,000 hectares (670,000 acres)(1932–2000)
- Kalfou Wildlife Park 4,000 hectares (9,900 acres) in 1933
- Lake Ossa Forest Reserve 4,000 hectares (9,900 acres) in Littoral zone in 1968
- Kimbi Forest Reserve 5,600 hectares (14,000 acres) in 1964
- Santchou Forest reserve 7,000 hectares (17,000 acres) in 1968
- Mbi Crater 400 hectares (990 acres) in 1964
- Mengame Game Sanctuary 17,500 hectares (43,000 acres) in 2000
- Mbayang Mbo Game Sanctuary 48,500 hectares (120,000 acres) in 2000
- Mbam et Djérem 416,512 hectares (1,029,220 acres)in 2000
- Boumba Bek Park 210,000 hectares (520,000 acres) in 2000
- Lobeke Park 428,000 hectares (1,060,000 acres) in 2000

== Gallery ==
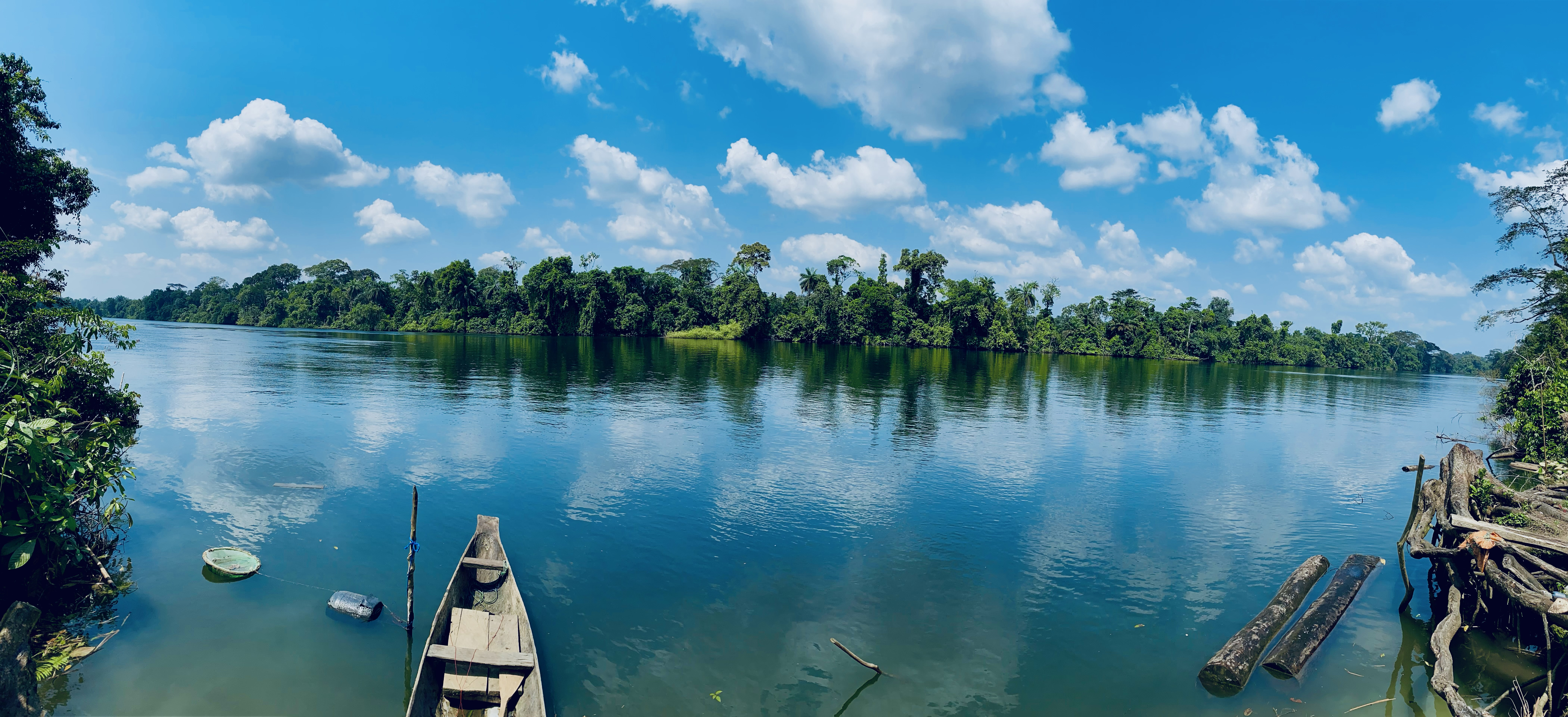
Beautiful sea view en route to Korup National Park

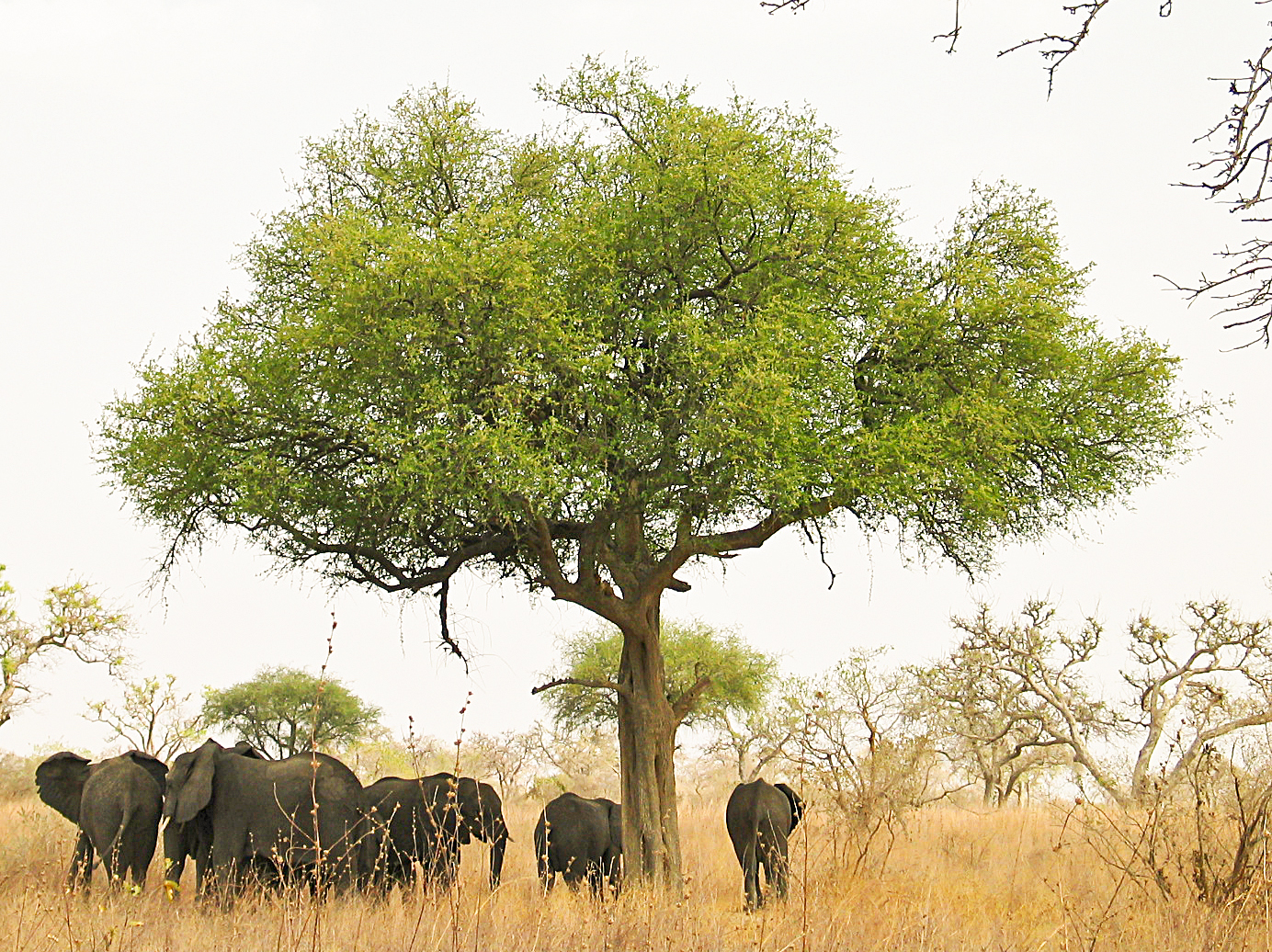
Elephants around tree in Waza, Cameroon

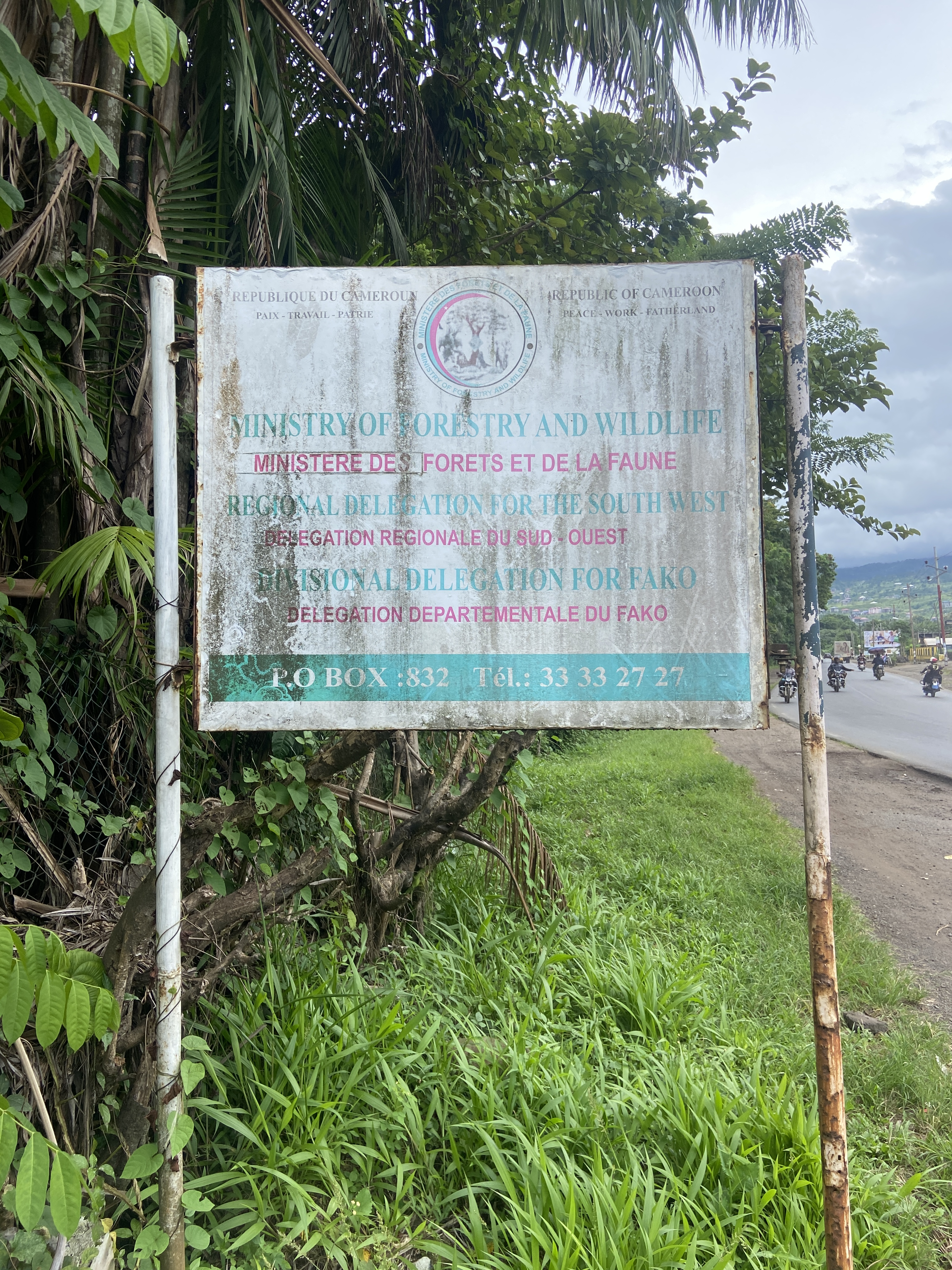
Signpost Regional Delegation for Southwest- Ministry of Forestry and Wildlife at the entrance to the Botanic garden Limbe.

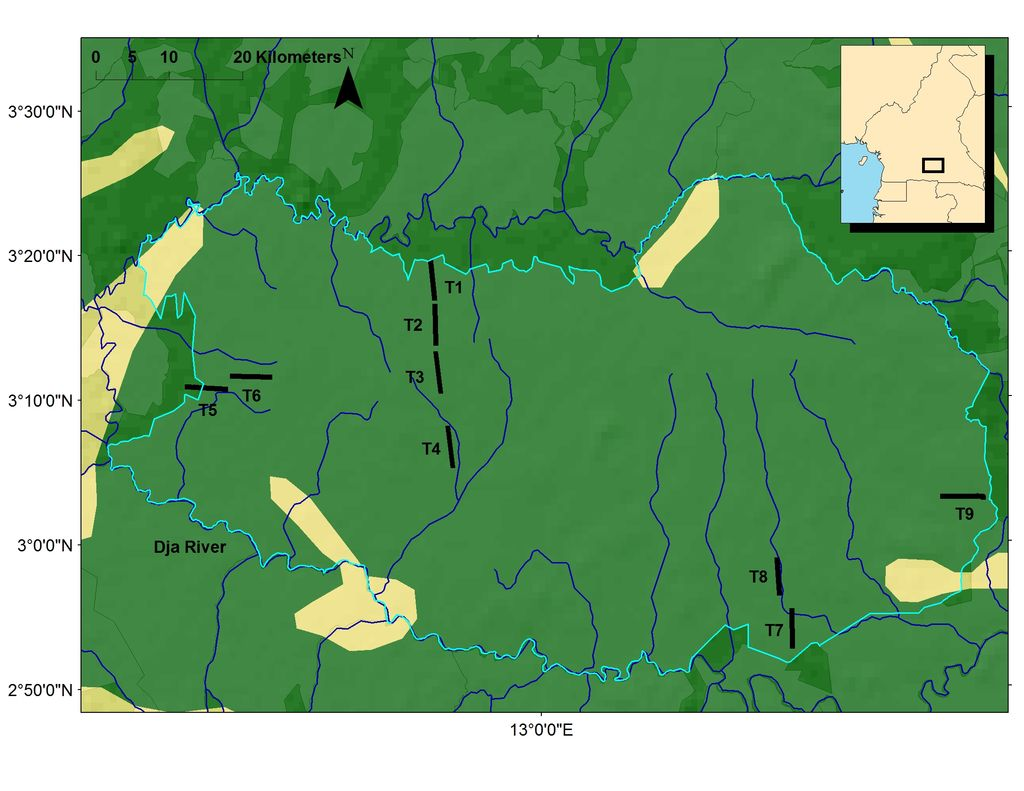
The Dja Faunal Reserve, South Cameroon

Satellite view of Waza National Park

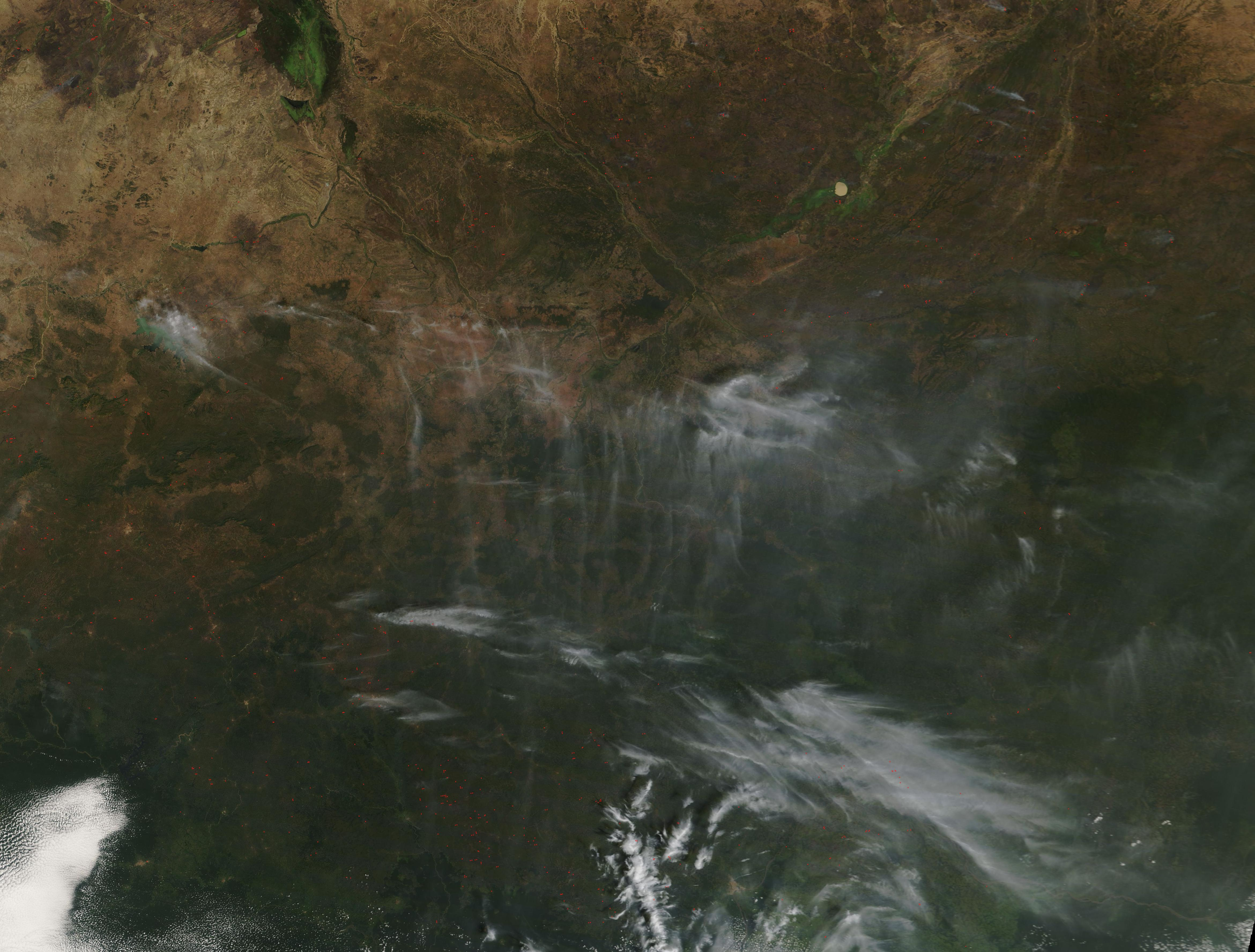
Satellite imagery of fires in Central Africa

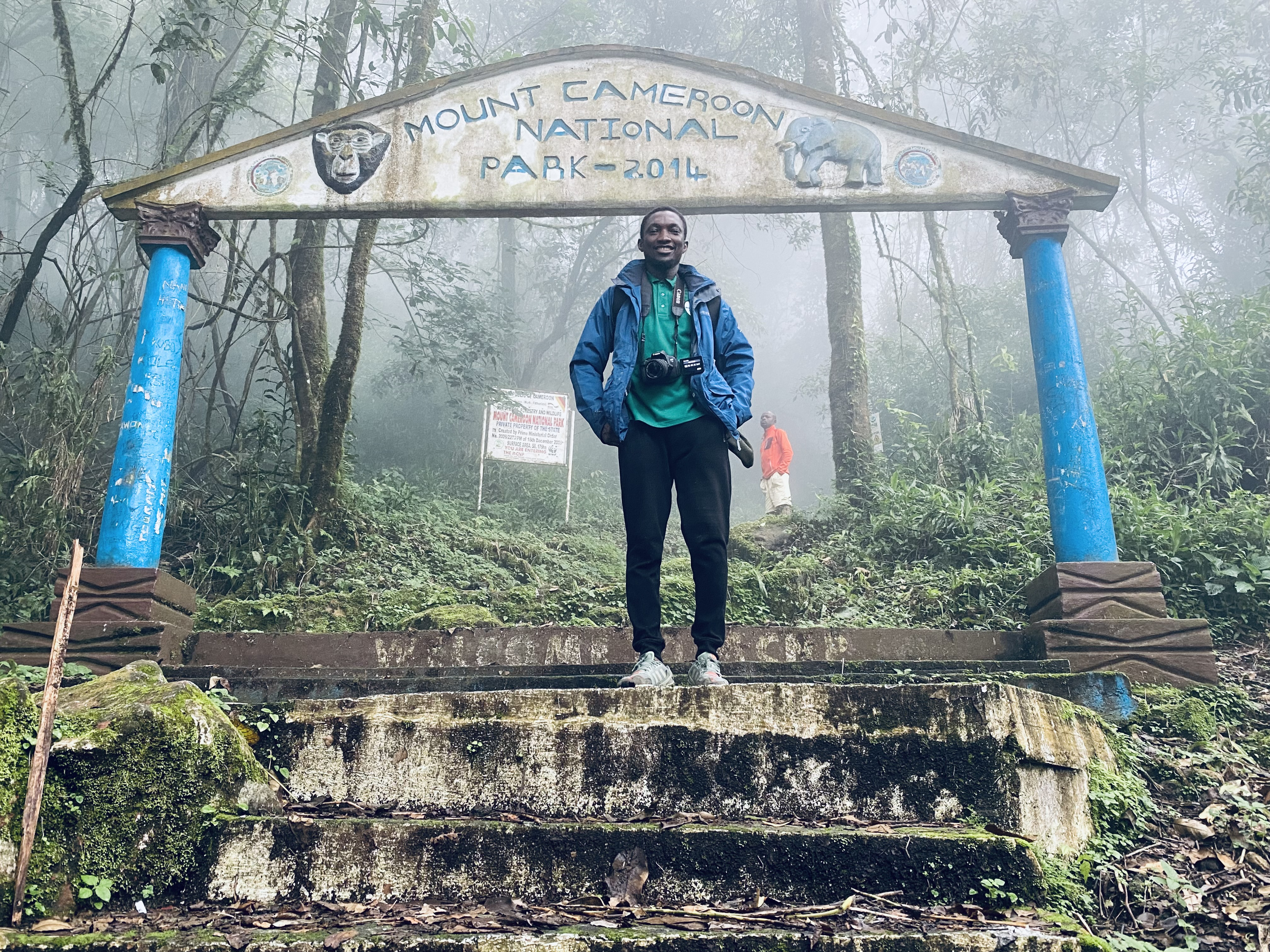
Mount Cameroon National Park entrance

== Bibliography ==
- S.N. Stuart, Richard J. Adams, Martin Jenkins. 1990. Biodiversity in sub-Saharan Africa and its islands: conservation, management, and sustainable use, Biodiversity Conservation Strategy Programme, International Union for Conservation of Nature and Natural Resources. Species Survival Commission, Published by IUCN, 242 pages, ISBN 2-8317-0021-3, ISBN 978-2-8317-0021-2.
