= Ngoyla Faunal Reserve =

Congolian rainforests protected area

- IUCN category IV (habitat/species management area)
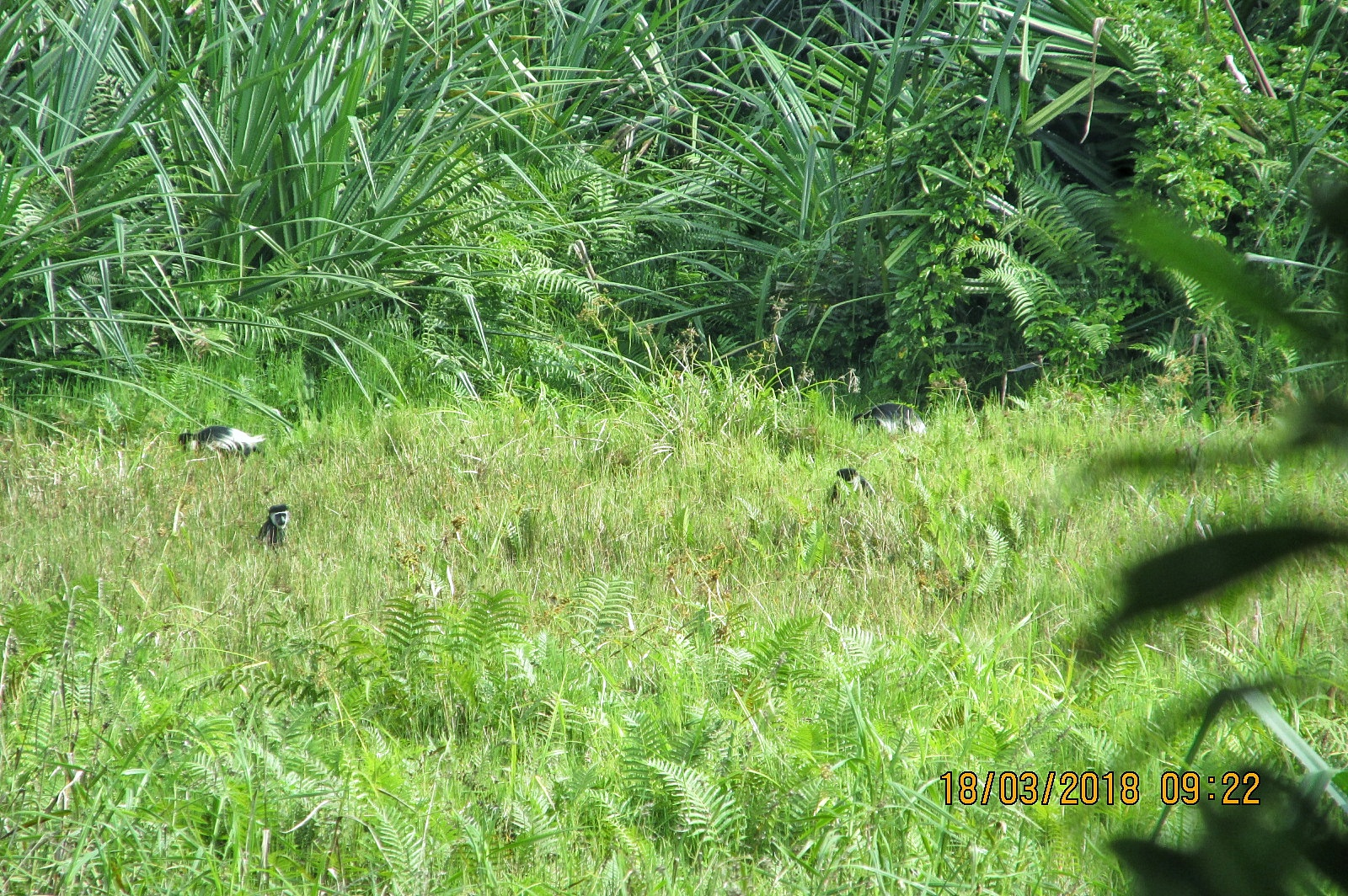

- Location within Cameroon
- Location: Haut-Nyong, East Region, Cameroon
- Nearest town: Lomié
- Coordinates: 2°24′N 13°51′E
- Area: 1,566 km^{2} (605 sq mi)
- Elevation: 500–600 m (1,600–2,000 ft)
- Designated: 27 August 2014

The Ngoyla Faunal Reserve is a 1,566 sq km-large protected area, which is situated in the south-eastern part of Cameroon. It is an important shelter and corridor for the Congolian rainforests megafauna within the tri-national Dja-Odzala-Minkébé protected area complex (TRIDOM).

== Description ==
The Ngoyla Faunal Reserve was officially created by the MINFOF (Ministry of Forestry and Wildlife) in 2014 with the support of WWF. It is found in the south-central part of the Ngoyla-Mintom massif. The climate of the reserve is tropical with two wet and two dry seasons. The annual precipitation is 1,500 mm in the northern, and 2,000 mm in the southern area, the average annual temperature is 24-25 °C due to the elevation (500-600 meters a.s.l.). Characteristic vegetation types are humid evergreen rainforests (82%), swamp forests (15%), natural forest clearances (2%), and secondary forest-farmbush mosaics (1%). Its biodiversity is notable; 230 fish, 280 bird, and 37 large and medium-sized mammal species have been recorded. Notable mammal species are the African forest elephant (Loxodonta cyclotis), western lowland gorilla (Gorilla gorilla gorilla), central chimpanzee (Pan troglodytes troglodytes), mandrill (Mandrillus sphinx), leopard (Panthera pardus), African forest buffalo (Syncerus caffer nanus), western bongo (Tragelaphus eurycerus), sitatunga (Tragelaphus spekii), and forest duikers. Besides the high density and diversity of forest animals, the Ngolya Faunal Reserve is an important corridor to migrating species, such as forest elephants by connecting the Dja Faunal Reserve, the Nki National Park, and the Minkébé National Park of Gabon, due to its location within the TRIDOM complex.

== See also ==
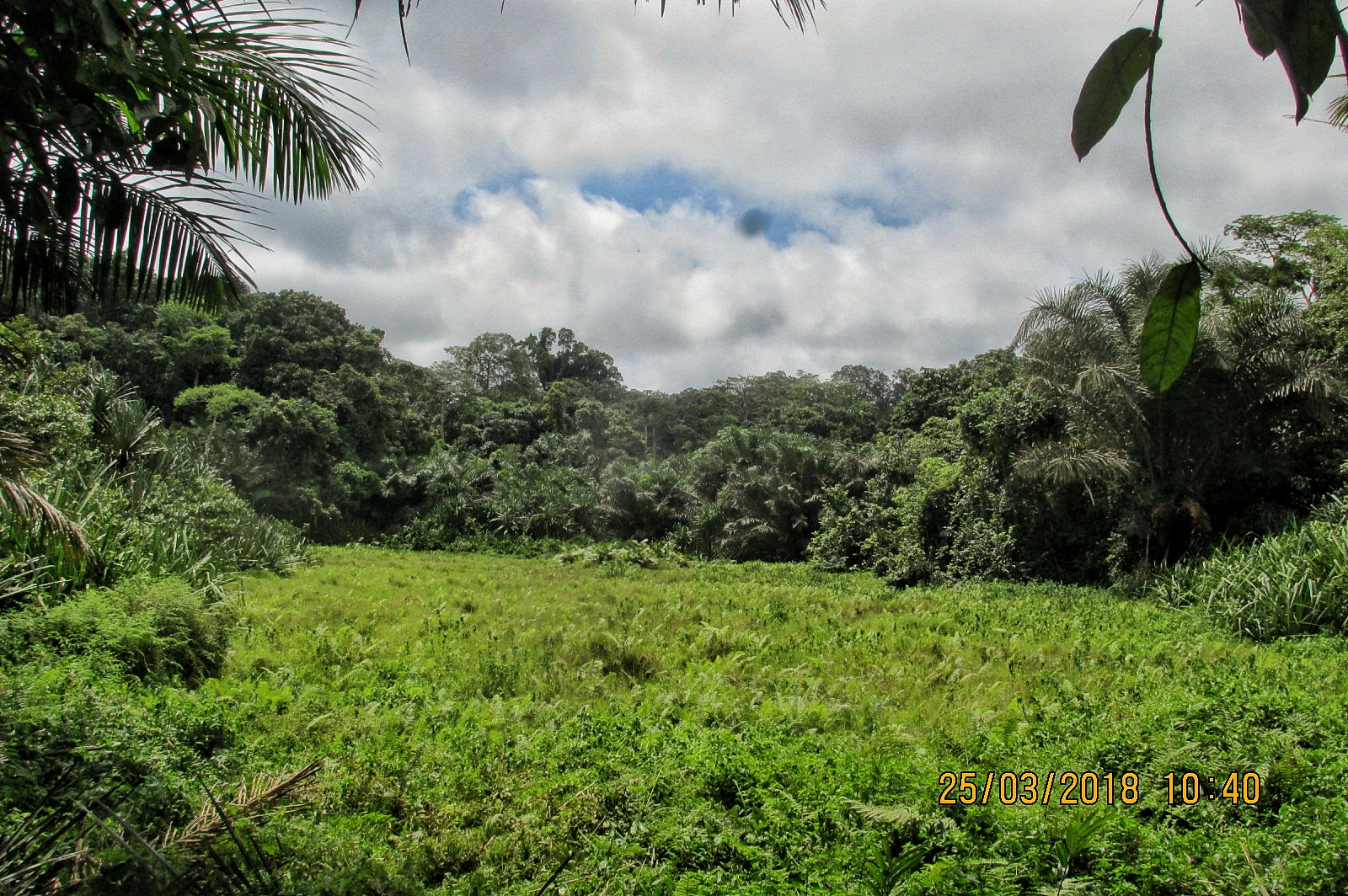
A natural forest clearance in the Ngoyla Faunal Reserve.

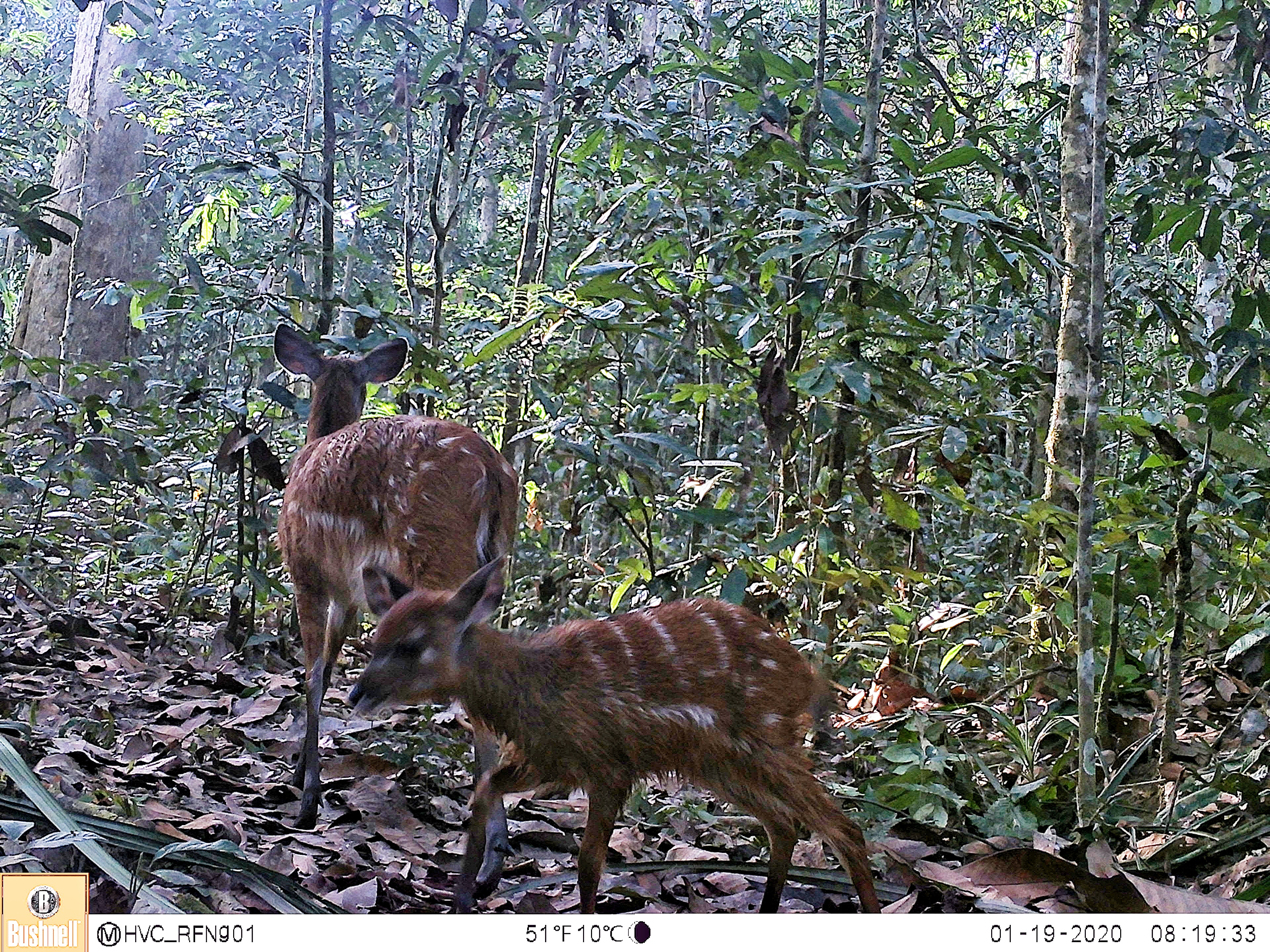
Sitatunga antelopes photo-captured in the Ngoyla Faunal Reserve.

- Protected areas of Cameroon
- Wildlife of Cameroon
- Dja Faunal Reserve
- Nki National Park
- Minkébé National Park
