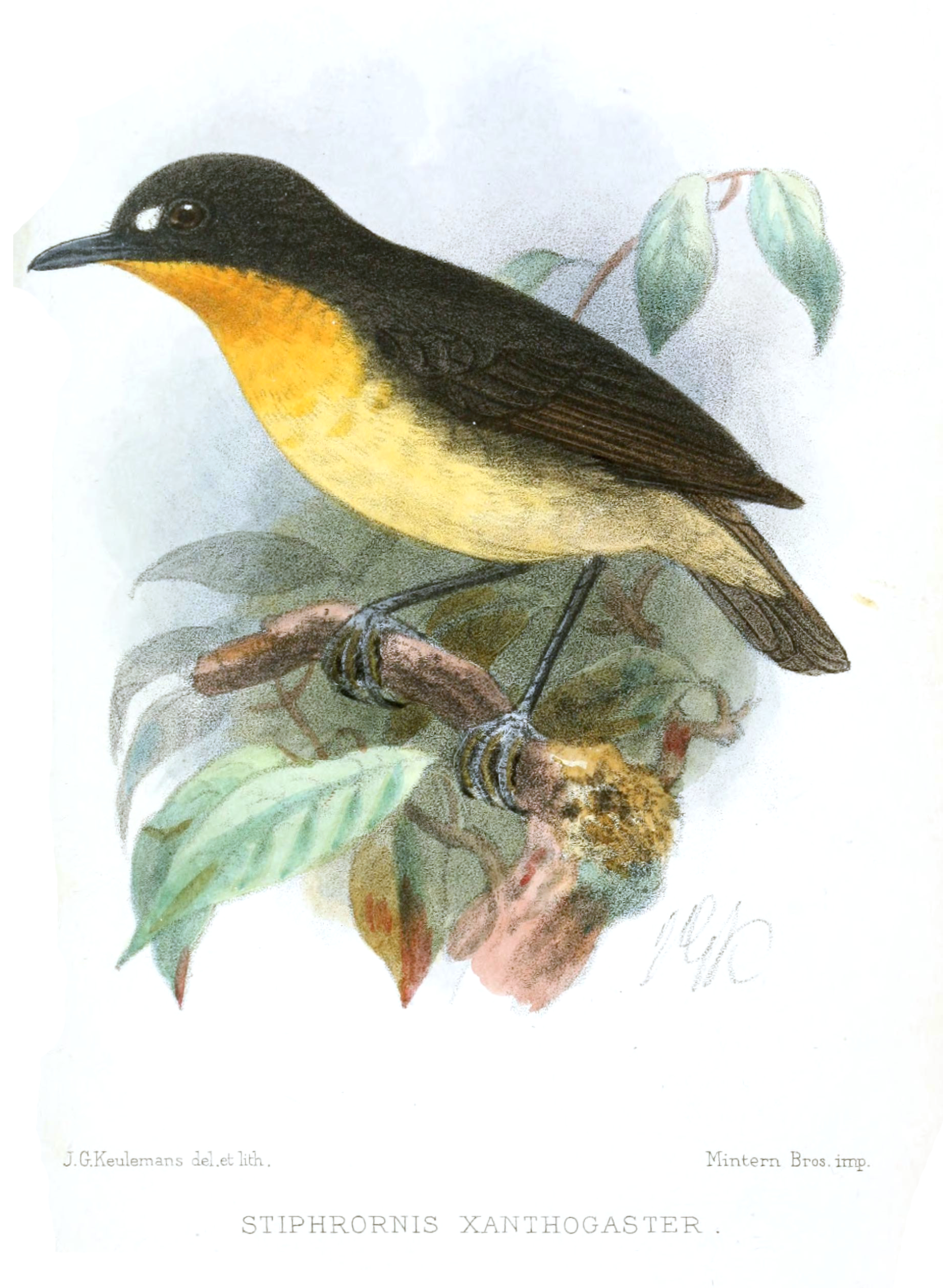

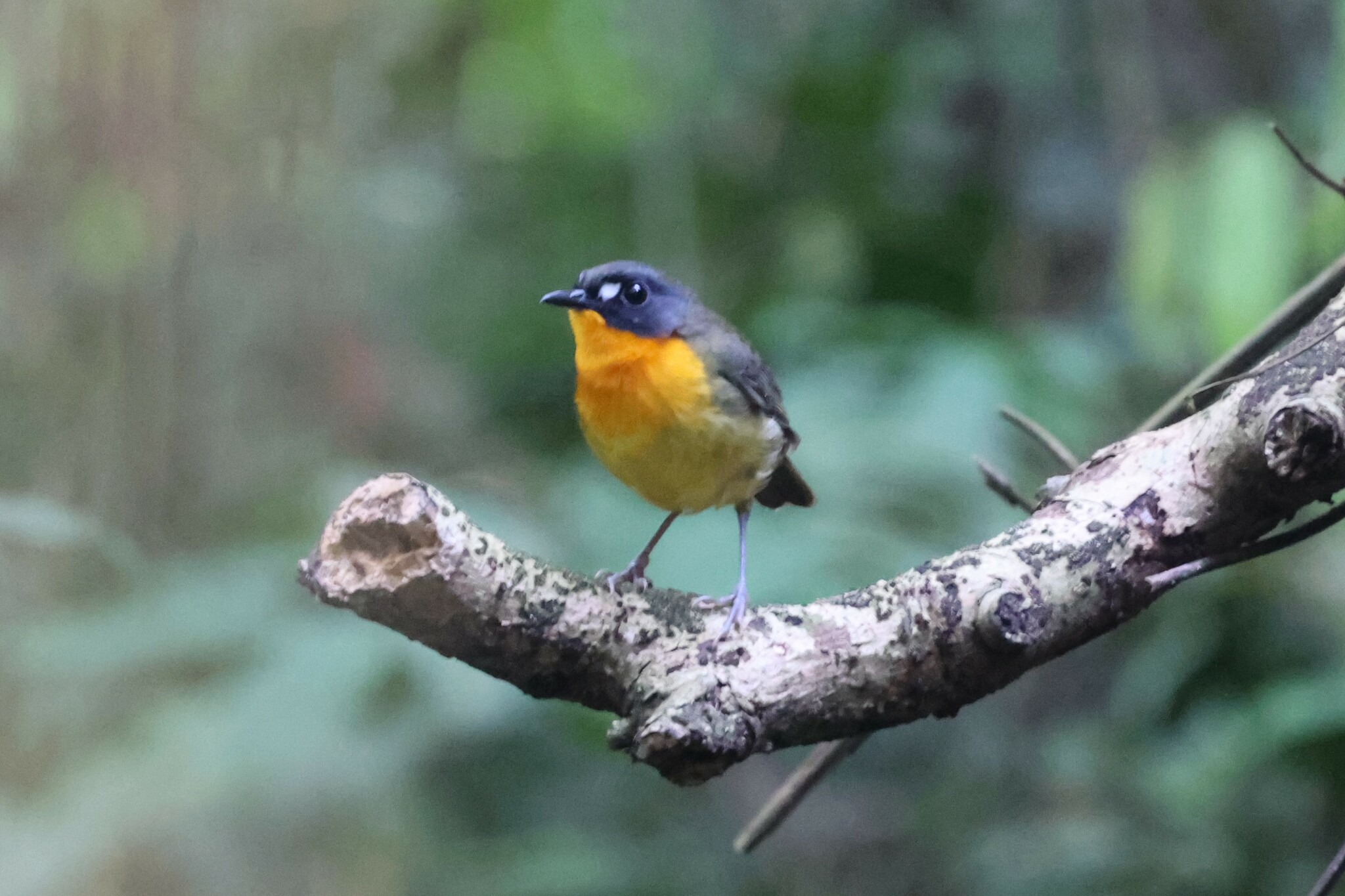

Conservation status
- Least Concern (IUCN 3.1)

Scientific classification
- Kingdom: Animalia
- Phylum: Chordata
- Class: Aves
- Order: Passeriformes
- Family: Muscicapidae
- Genus: Stiphrornis
- Species: S. xanthogaster

Binomial name
- Stiphrornis xanthogaster Sharpe, 1903

= Yellow-breasted forest robin =

Species of bird

The yellow-breasted forest robin (Stiphrornis xanthogaster), also known as the eastern forest robin, is a species of passerine bird in the family Muscicapidae that is found at low levels in forests from Cameroon and Gabon to DR Congo, Congo and Uganda. In 1999 it was recommended that it should be treated as a separate species instead of a subspecies.

== Taxonomy ==
The yellow-breasted forest robin was formally described in 1903 by the English ornithologist Richard Bowdler Sharpe under the current binomial name Stiphrornis xanthogaster based on a specimen collected on the banks of the Dja River in Cameroon. The specific epithet combines the Ancient Greek ξανθος/xanthos meaning "yellow" with γαστηρ/gastēr meaning "belly".

Three subspecies are recognised:

- Stiphrornis xanthogaster xanthogaster Sharpe, 1903 – southeast Cameroon and northeast Gabon to north, central DR Congo and south Uganda
- Stiphrornis xanthogaster sanghensis Beresford & Cracraft, 1999 – southwest Central African Republic
- Stiphrornis xanthogaster rudderi Voelker, Tobler, Prestridge, Duijm, Groenenberg, Martin, AD, Nieman & Roselaar & Huntley, 2017 – central north DR Congo
