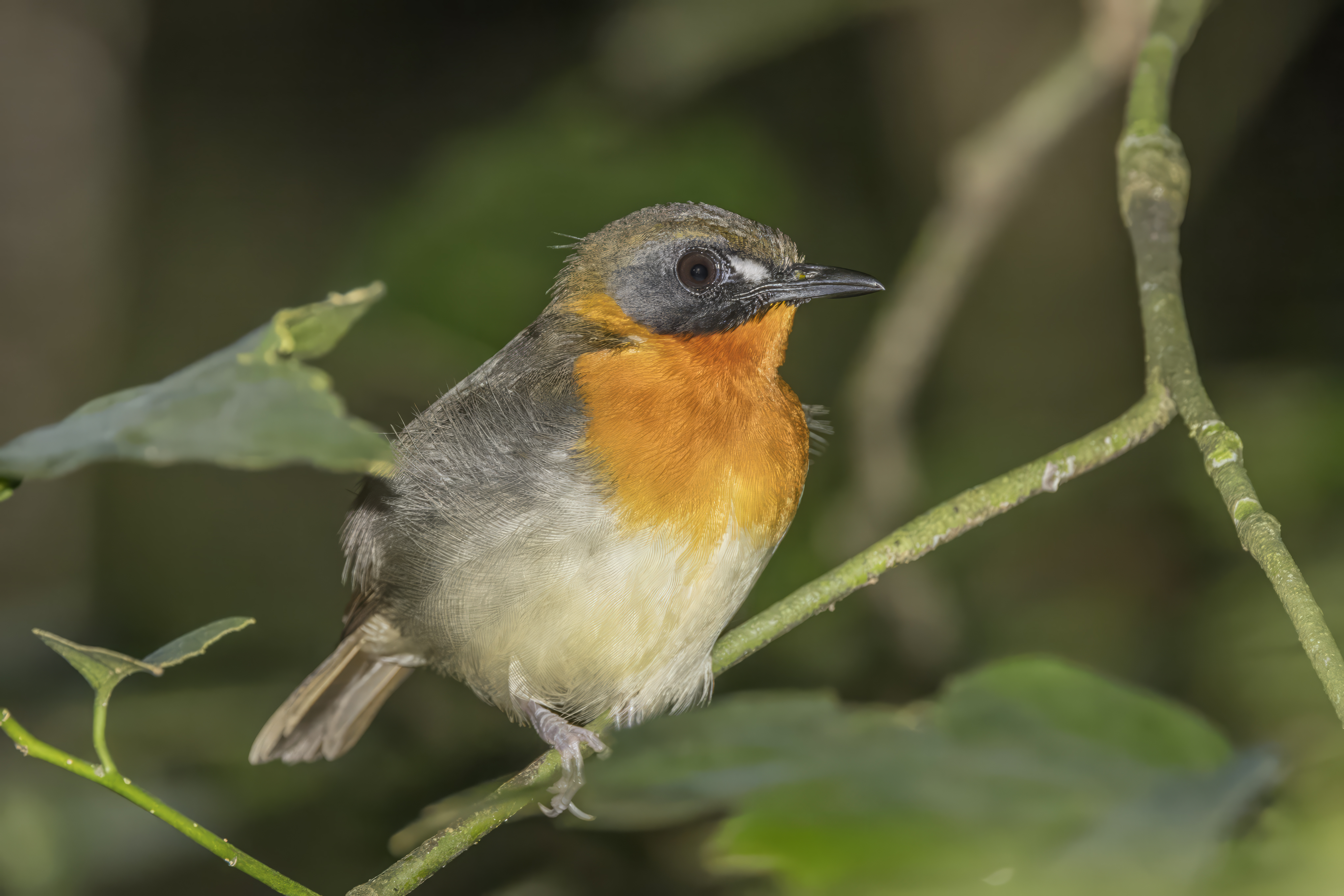
- Orange-breasted forest robin (Stiphrornis erythrothorax)

Scientific classification
- Kingdom: Animalia
- Phylum: Chordata
- Class: Aves
- Order: Passeriformes
- Family: Muscicapidae
- Genus: Stiphrornis; Hartlaub, 1855

Type species
- Stiphrornis erythrothorax Hartlaub, 1855

= Stiphrornis =

Genus of birds

Stiphrornis is a genus of passerine birds containing the forest robins. These are members of the Old World flycatcher family Muscicapidae and are found in the tropical rain-forests of West Africa. The genus formerly contained only a single species, the forest robin, but this species complex has been split so that the genus now contains three species.

== Taxonomy ==
The genus Stiphrornis was introduced in 1855 by the German ornithologist Gustav Hartlaub with Stiphrornis erythrothorax Hartlaub (the orange-breasted forest robin) as the type species. The genus name combines the Ancient Greek στιφρος/stiphros meaning "sturdy" or "stout" with ορνις/ornis meaning "bird".

All taxa within the genus Stiphrornis were formerly considered to comprise a single species, the forest robin (S. erythrothorax), but in 1999, it was argued, based on the phylogenetic species concept, that all then-recognized taxa should be considered separate monotypic species. The split was not followed in 2005 by the Handbook of the Birds of the World, where it was described as "perhaps premature". An additional taxon, Stiphrornis pyrrholaemus (the olive-backed forest robin) was described as a new species in 2008, but this taxon was treated as a subspecies of the forest robin in 2014 in the fourth edition of the Howard and Moore Complete Checklist of the Birds of the World.

In 2017 Garry Voelker and collaborators described three additional taxa in the forest robin species complex and in the same article reported the results of a molecular phylogenetic study of the complex. The authors chose to treat all eight taxa as separate species, but other ornithologists have not followed this lead and have instead divided the taxa into three species.

== Species ==
The genus contains three species:

- Orange-breasted forest robin, Stiphrornis erythrothorax
- Yellow-breasted forest robin, Stiphrornis xanthogaster
- Olive-backed forest robin, Stiphrornis pyrrholaemus

The cladogram below showing the relationships between the taxa is based on a molecular phylogenetic study by Garry Voelker and collaborators that was published in 2017. The species are those recognised by Frank Gill, Pamela C. Rasmussen and David Donsker in the list of world birds maintained on behalf of the International Ornithological Committee (IOC).

- Stiphrornis
  - Olive-backed forest robin (Stiphrornis pyrrholaemus)
    pyrrholaemus
  - - Yellow-breasted forest robin (Stiphrornis xanthogaster)
      - xanthogaster
      - - rudderi
        - sanghensis
    - Orange-breasted forest robin (Stiphrornis erythrothorax)
      - erythrothorax
      - - inexpectatus
        - - dahomeyensis
          - gabonensis
