= Faro National Park =

National park in Cameroon

- IUCN category II (national park)
- Location within Cameroon
- Location: Cameroon
- Coordinates: 8°10′N 12°40′E
- Area: 3,300 km^{2} (1,300 sq mi)
- Governing body: Cameroon National Parks

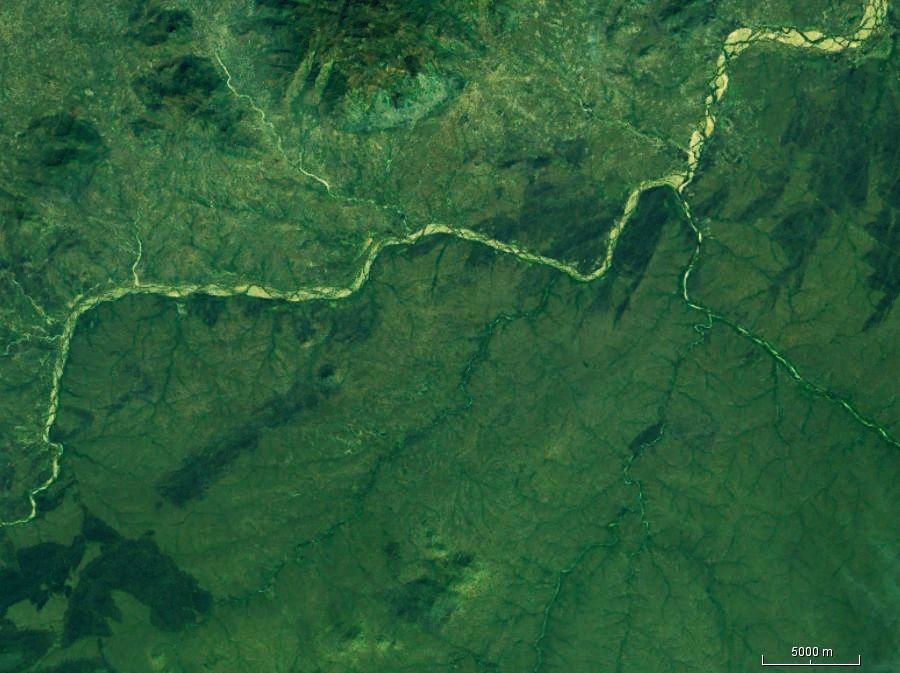
Faro River

Faro National Park is a national park and protected area in North Province of Cameroon, close to the Nigerian border. It forms a component of a broader protected landscape in Central Africa. Established in 1989, it covers an area of 3,418 km^{2} (1,320 sq mi). The park is home to large mammal populations, including African elephants, African lions, cheetahs, black rhinoceros, and various hippopotamus.

== History ==
Faro National Park formed a part of the Lamido de Tchamba Reserve, a designated forest reserve since 1947. It was officially incorporated in 1980 by the government. The park forms a component of a broader protected landscape in Central Africa, which stretches across the Nigerian border as the Gashaka Gumti National Park.

== Geography ==
The park covers an area of 3,418 km^{2} (1,320 sq mi) and lies in the Faro River basin, predominantly in the drier Sudano-Sahelian region. It is located close to the Nigerian border on the west, and there are several hunting reserves spread across the region along the eastern side of the park. The park is sandwiched between the Faro and Déo rivers, which flow along the boundaries of the national park. The water levels of the rivers vary across seasons, revealing sandy embankments during the drier season. The topography of park is generally undulating with an average altitude of approximately 250 to 500 m (820 to 1,640 ft) above sea level. It consists of few scattered hills rising to 700 to 1,000 m (2,300 to 3,300 ft), spread across the Savannah plains.

== Biodiversity ==
The vegetation consists of woodlands in the south, which is intermingled with mixed grasslands in the north interspersed with dense deciduous and semi-evergreen forests. The region has its own micro climate, and the presence of various forest habitats supports a wide range of species. The park is home to large mammals such as cheetahs, black rhinoceros, elephants, lions, and colonies of hippopotamuses. It has the largest hippopotamus population in Central and West Africa.

== Threats and conservation ==
The park faces various threats due to commercial poaching, climate change, illegal fishing, mining, and human-wildlife conflict due to cross-border livestock rearing. Conservation organizations work with the government to ensure the needs of local communities and Indigenous people are met.

== See also ==
- List of national parks of Cameroon
- Communes of Cameroon
