= Mengame Gorilla Sanctuary =

Sanctuary in Cameroon

Coordinates: 2.338°N 12.169°E

The 'Mengame Gorilla Sanctuary, also known as Mengame Wildlife Sanctuary, is found in Cameroon. It was established in 2001. This site is 1,218.07 km².
