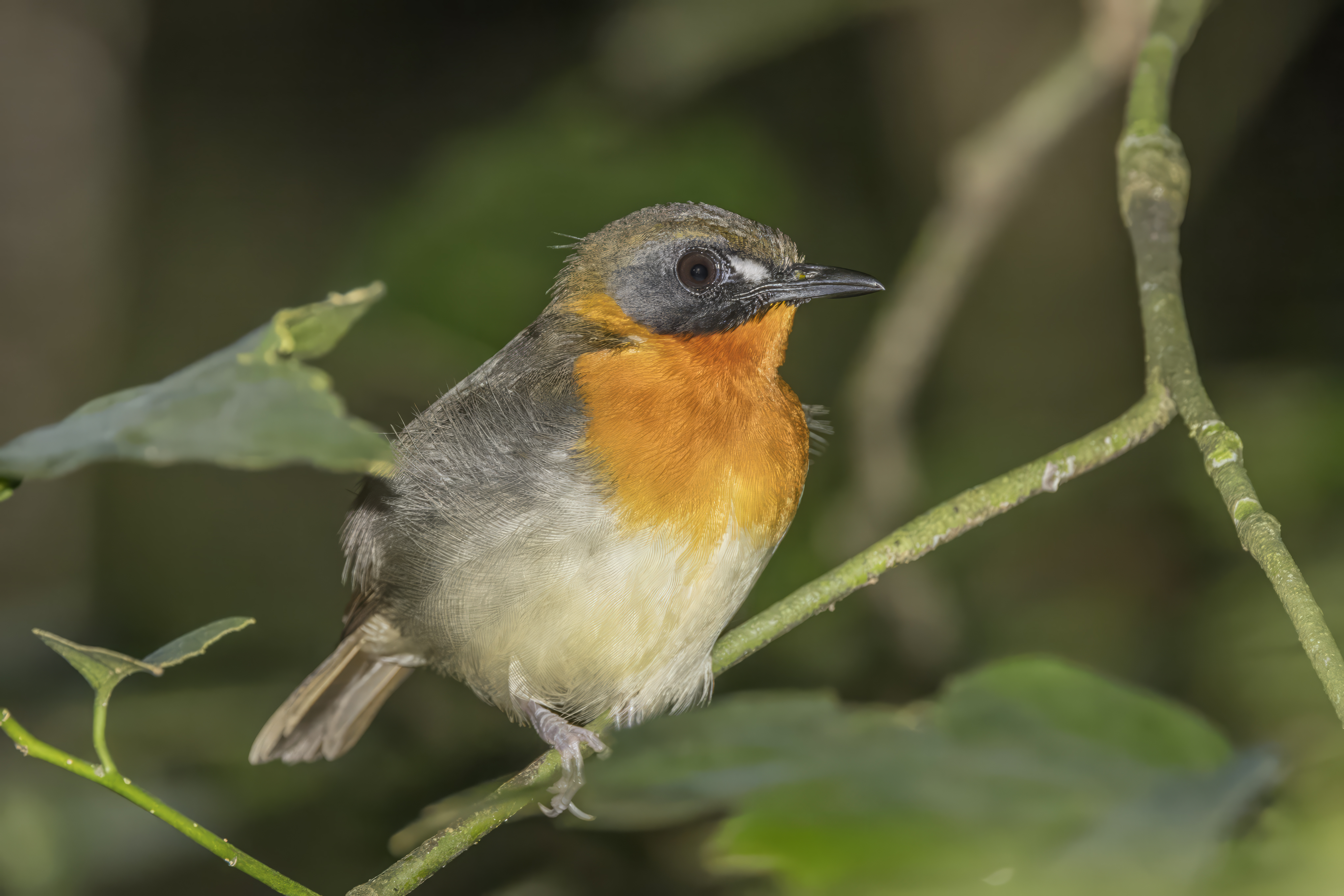
- Ankasa Forest Reserve, Ghana

Conservation status
- Least Concern (IUCN 3.1)

Scientific classification
- Kingdom: Animalia
- Phylum: Chordata
- Class: Aves
- Order: Passeriformes
- Family: Muscicapidae
- Genus: Stiphrornis
- Species: S. erythrothorax

Binomial name
- Stiphrornis erythrothorax Hartlaub, 1855

= Orange-breasted forest robin =

Species of bird

The orange-breasted forest robin (Stiphrornis erythrothorax) is a species of bird mainly found throughout the African tropical rainforest. It has a total length of around 12 cm (4 3/4 in), has dark upperparts, and a throat and chest that, depending on the subspecies, is yellow-orange or deep orange.

== Description ==
It has a total length of around 12 cm (4 3/4 in), has dark upperparts, and a throat and chest that, depending on the exact subspecies, is yellow-orange or deep orange.

== Taxonomy ==
The orange-breasted forest robin was formally described in 1855 by the German ornithologist Gustav Hartlaub under the current binomial name Stiphrornis erythrothorax. The specimen had been collected by the Dutch zoologist and colonial administrator Hendrik Severinus Pel at Dabocrom, Ghana. (Note: The type locality, "Dabocrom", is believed to have been near the Ghanese coast between Abidjan and Accra at 4°51′N 1°56′W.) The specific epithet combines the Ancient Greek ερυθρος/eruthros meaning "red" with θωραξ/thōrax meaning "breastplate".

The initial split into multiple species within this genus is based on a review from 1999 where it, based on the phylogenetic species concept, was argued that all then recognized taxa should be considered monotypic species. Of these, S. gabonensis and S. xanthogaster were formerly considered subspecies of S. erythrothorax, whereas S. sanghensis was described as an entirely new species. The split was not followed in Handbook of the Birds of the World, where it was described as "perhaps premature". Comparably, the BirdLife Taxonomic Working Group (and consequently IUCN) recommended not following the split, as differences in plumages are relatively small, genetic sampling considered incomplete, and evidence for intergradation or parapatry is lacking. Another species from this complex, S. pyrrholaemus, was described as a new species in 2008. Based on mtDNA, it is placed within S. erythrothorax sensu lato, and consequently is only a species (rather than a subspecies of S. erythrothorax) if at least some of the taxonomy recommended in 1999 is followed. The genetic divergence between S. pyrrholaemus and other members of the genus is comparable to that between some other closely related species.

Three additional taxa in the forest robin complex were described (as species) in 2016: Stiphrornis (erythrothorax) dahomeyensis (Dahomey forest robin), S. (e.) inexpectatus (Ghana forest robin), and S. (e.) rudderi (Rudder's forest robin). These three taxa are nested within S. erythrothorax sensu lato; however, using the phylogenetic species concept, the study recommended the treatment of all eight forest robin taxa as distinct species.

Clements recognizes three species. the olive-backed forest robin, Stiphrornis pyrrholaemus, the orange-breasted forest robin, Stiphrornis erythrothorax, and the yellow-breasted forest robin, Stiphrornis mabirae.

=== Subspecies ===
Four subspecies are recognised:

- S. e. erythrothorax Hartlaub, 1855 – Sierra Leone to southwest Ghana
- S. e. gabonensis Sharpe, 1883 – Ghana east to central Cameroon and north Gabon; Bioko (Gulf of Guinea)
- S. e. dahomeyensis Voelker, Tobler, Prestridge, Duijm, Groenenberg, Martin, AD, Nieman & Roselaar & Huntley, 2017 – south Benin, southeast Ghana
- S. e. inexpectatus Voelker, Tobler, Prestridge, Duijm, Groenenberg, Martin, AD, Nieman & Roselaar & Huntley, 2017 – southwest Ghana
