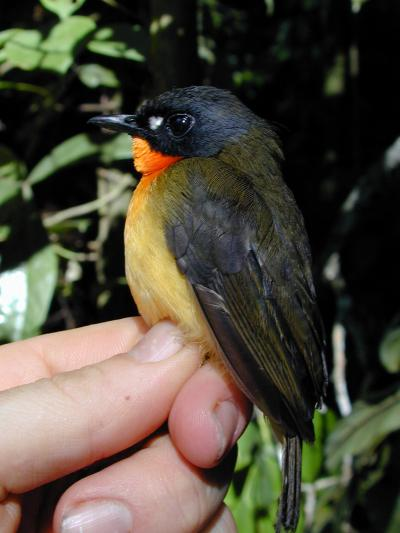
- Male

Conservation status
- Near Threatened (IUCN 3.1)

Scientific classification
- Kingdom: Animalia
- Phylum: Chordata
- Class: Aves
- Order: Passeriformes
- Family: Muscicapidae
- Genus: Stiphrornis
- Species: S. pyrrholaemus

Binomial name
- Stiphrornis pyrrholaemus Schmidt & Angehr, 2008

= Olive-backed forest robin =

Species of bird

The olive-backed forest robin (Stiphrornis pyrrholaemus) is a species of passerine bird in the Old World flycatcher family Muscicapidae that is found in the Gamba Complex within southwest Gabon. It was described in 2008. The olive-backed forest robin can be distinguished from other species in the forest robin complex by the combination of its olive upperparts, bright orange throat and chest, and cream-yellow belly. Its song is also distinct from other subspecies of the forest robin. Females are generally duller than males.

Though this species was described in 2008, a juvenile appears to have been collected on 11 November 1953 in Tchibanga, Gabon. The specimen is deposited in the Muséum national d'Histoire naturelle in Paris. Its identity was confirmed by comparison of the DNA sequences.

== Taxonomy ==
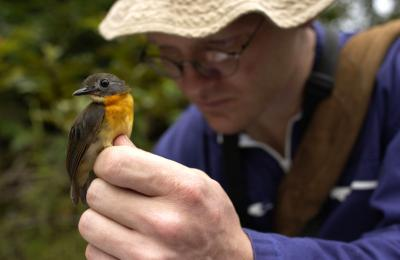
A female in hand

The olive-backed forest robin was formerly described in 2008 by Brian Schmidt and collaborators under the binomial name Stiphrornis pyrrholaemus based on a specimen collected in the Moukalaba-Doudou National Park, Gabon, West Africa. The specific epithet combines the Ancient Greek πυρρος/purrhos meaning "flame-coloured" or "red" with λαιμος/laimos meaning "throat". The olive-backed forest robin was formerly considered to be a subspecies of the forest robin, but is now treated as a separate species. It is monotypic: no subspecies are recognised.
