= Mandelia Faunal Reserve =

Protected area in Chad

- IUCN category IV (habitat/species management area)
- Interactive map of Mandelia Faunal Reserve
- Location: Chad
- Nearest city: Chad
- Area: 1,380 km^{2} (530 sq mi)
- Established: 1969

The Mandelia Faunal Reserve in Chad was declared a reserve in 1969 covering an area of 1380 km^{2}

== Geography ==
The reserve gets flooded when the rivers Chari and Logone overflow during the rainy season.

== Wildlife ==
The reserve has a good amount of dense savanna woodland vegetation.

The fauna consists of mammals including elephant (there were 660 initially when the reserve came to be gazetted Many ungulate species and birds are also reported. Larger mammals species such as elephant and kob which had migrated to Cameroon are reported to be coming back to Chad due to hunting pressure in that country.

== Conservation ==
There are apart from poaching pressure, illegal grazing and cultivation which are issues created by the local people inhabiting in many villages within the reserve and also poachers and from Cameroon. There are indications that the reserve may be de-gazetted.
