= Dja Faunal Reserve =

Reserve in southeastern Cameroon

- IUCN category IV (habitat/species management area)
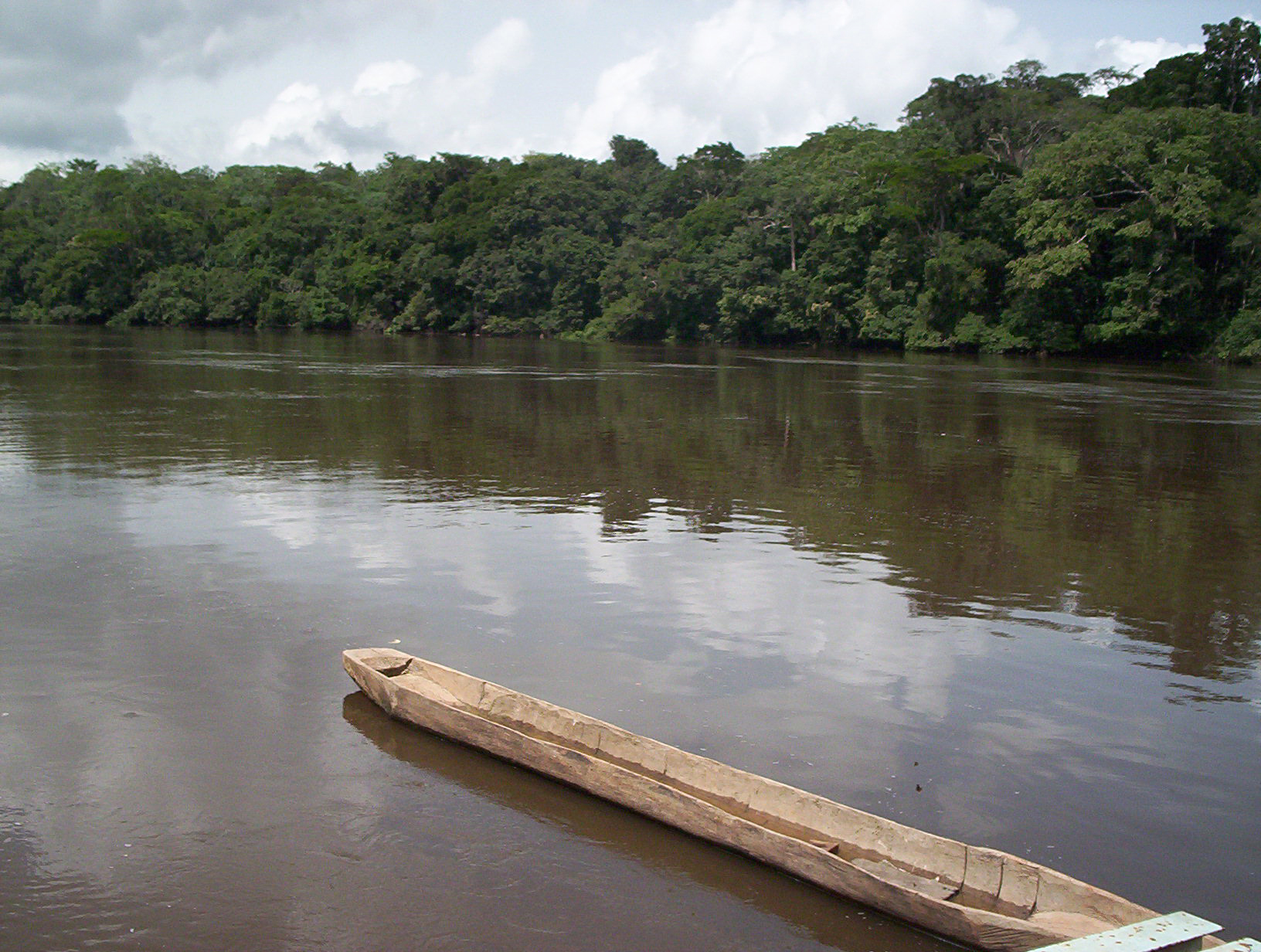
- Pirogue on the Dja River

- Location within Cameroon
- Location: Cameroon
- Coordinates: 3°0′N 13°0′E
- Area: 5,260 km^{2} (2,030 sq mi)
- Established: 1950

UNESCO World Heritage Site
- Type: Natural
- Criteria: ix, x
- Designated: 1987 (11th session)
- Reference no.: 407
- Region: Africa

Dja Faunal Reserve (French: Réserve de faune du Dja, Réserve de Biosphère Dja), located in southeastern Cameroon, is a UNESCO World Heritage Site inscribed in 1987. Causes of inscription include diversity of species present in the park, the presence of five threatened species of mammal, and lack of disturbance within the park. It is managed by Dja Conservation Services (DCS), which is led by a conservator. The Reserve receives significant support for its management from many projects funded by international partners and supporters of conservation in Cameroon.

== Geology ==
The Dja River almost completely surrounds the reserve and forms a natural boundary which encloses 5,260 km^{2} (1,300,000 acres).

== History ==
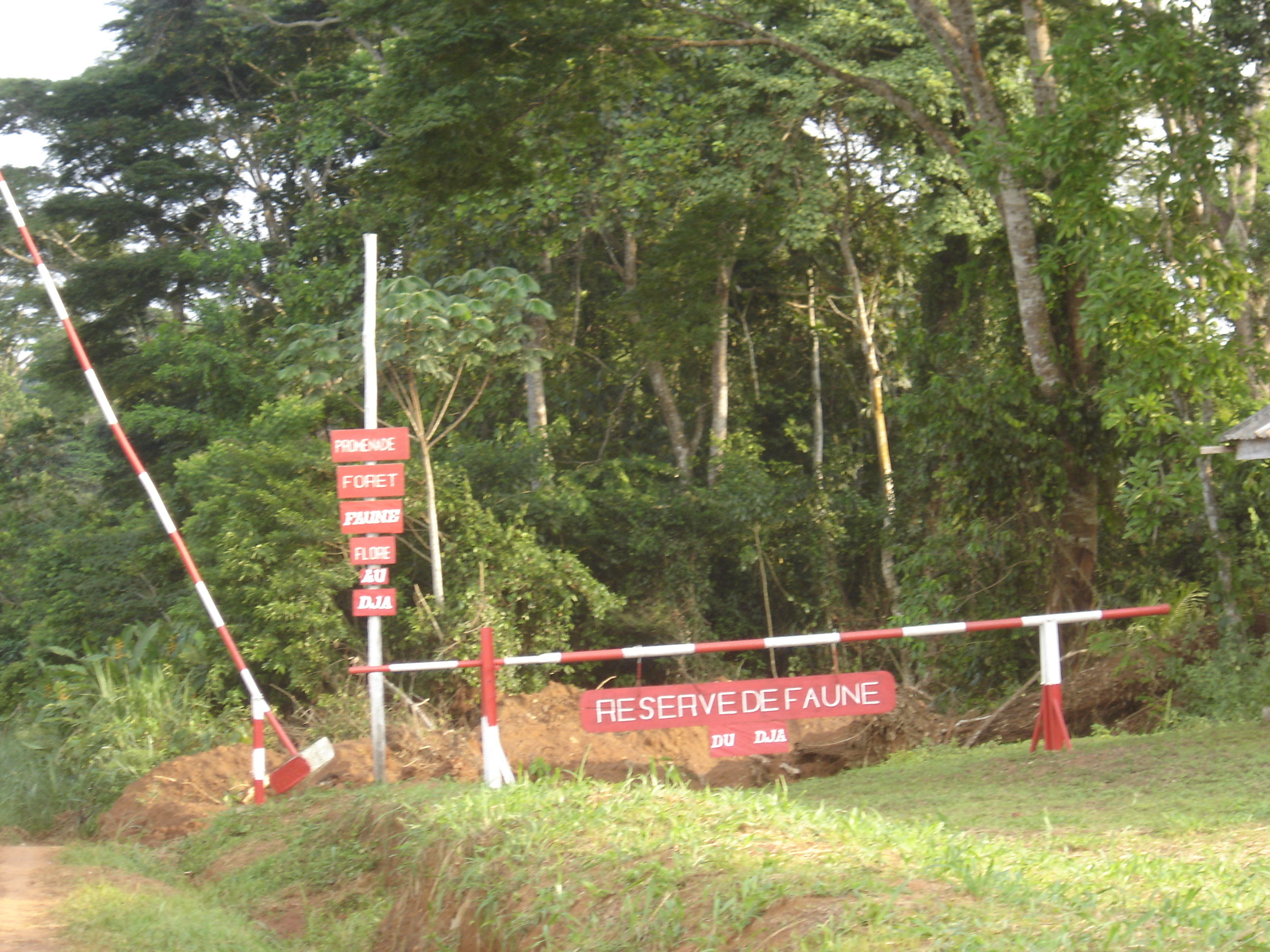
access gate

The Dja Faunal Reserve was created in 1950 and became a World Heritage Site in 1987 and it forms an integral part of the dense rain forests that make up the Congo Basin. It is one of the largest and best-protected reserves within the rainforest zones of Africa with around 90% of its area remaining undisturbed. The Dja Faunal Reserve is especially notable for the diversity of primate species it protects including white-collared mangabey, mandrill, drill, western lowland gorilla and chimpanzee. It adjoins onto the Congolese reserve of the Odzala-Kokoua National Park and the Gabonese Minkébé National Park to form the TRIDOMarea, an important zone for the protection of the African rainforest habitat of the Congo basin.

== Fauna ==
There are more than 1,500 known plant species in the reserve, over 107 mammals (including forest elephants, African forest buffalo and leopard) and more than 320 bird species. There is also a population of Baka pygmies living in a relatively traditional manner within the boundaries of the reserve. They confer a recognized cultural value to the site and are permitted to hunt using traditional methods, although agriculture and professional hunting are banned.

== Indigenous peoples ==
The Dja Faunal Reserve is home to about 40,000 people, including Bantu farmers and Baka hunter-gatherers, for whom the forest is sacred. The Baka live semi-nomadically, relying on hunting, fishing, and gathering while practising sustainable techniques that preserve wildlife and plant resources. Their culture, spiritual beliefs, and traditional knowledge are intimately tied to the forest, passed down through stories, songs, and communal rituals.
