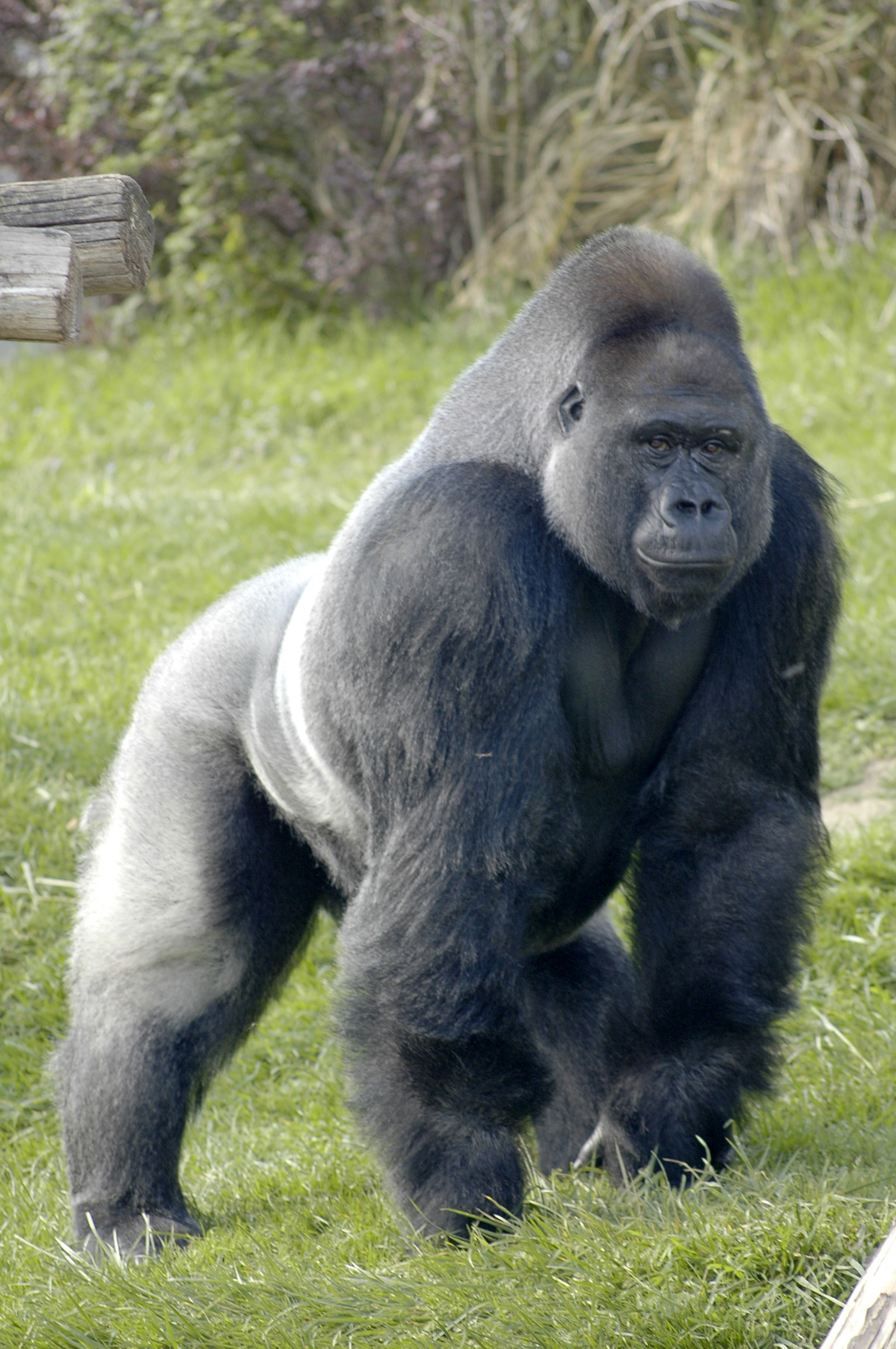
- Male western gorilla (Gorilla gorilla)

Scientific classification
- Kingdom: Animalia
- Phylum: Chordata
- Class: Mammalia
- Order: Primates
- Superfamily: Hominoidea
- Family: Hominidae
- Tribe: Gorillini
- Genus: Gorilla; I. Geoffroy, 1852

Type species
- Troglodytes gorilla Savage, 1847

Species
- Gorilla gorilla Gorilla beringei
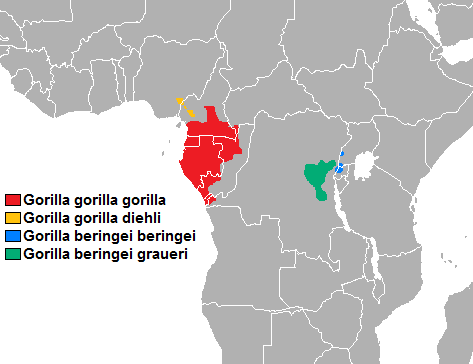
- Distribution of gorillas

Synonyms
- Pseudogorilla Elliot, 1913

= Gorilla =

Genus of large African apes

Gorillas are large, primarily herbivorous, great apes that live in the tropical forests of equatorial Africa. The genus Gorilla is divided into two species: the eastern gorilla and the western gorilla, and either four or five subspecies. The DNA of gorillas is highly similar to that of humans, and they are the next closest living relatives to humans after the bonobos and chimpanzees.

Gorillas are the largest living primates, reaching heights between 1.25 and 1.8 m (4 ft 1 in and 5 ft 11 in), weights between 68 and 227 kg (150 and 500 lb), and arm spans up to 2.6 m (8 ft 6 in), depending on species and sex. They tend to live in troops, with the leader being called a silverback. The eastern gorilla is distinguished from the western by darker fur colour and some other minor morphological differences. Gorillas tend to live 35–40 years in the wild.

Gorillas' natural habitats cover tropical or subtropical forests in Sub-Saharan Africa. Although their range covers a small percentage of Sub-Saharan Africa, gorillas cover a wide range of elevations. The mountain gorilla inhabits the Albertine Rift montane cloud forests of the Virunga Volcanoes, ranging in altitude from 2,200 to 4,300 m (7,200 to 14,100 ft). Lowland gorillas live in dense forests and lowland swamps and marshes as low as sea level, with western lowland gorillas living in Central West African countries and eastern lowland gorillas living in the Democratic Republic of the Congo near its border with Rwanda.

There are thought to be around 316,000 western gorillas in the wild, and 5,000 eastern gorillas. Both species are classified as Critically Endangered by the IUCN; all subspecies are classified as Critically Endangered with the exception of the mountain gorilla, which is classified as Endangered. There are many threats to their survival, such as poaching, habitat destruction, and disease, which threaten the survival of the species. However, conservation efforts have been successful in some areas where they live.

== History and etymology ==
The word gorilla comes from the history of Hanno the Navigator (c. 500 BC), a Carthaginian explorer on an expedition to the west African coast to the area that later became Sierra Leone. Members of the expedition encountered "savage people, the greater part of whom were women, whose bodies were hairy, and whom our interpreters called Gorillae". It is unknown whether what the explorers encountered were what we now call gorillas, another species of ape or monkeys, or humans. Skins of gorillai women, brought back by Hanno, are reputed to have been kept at Carthage until Rome destroyed the city 350 years later at the end of the Punic Wars, 146 BC.

In 1625 Andrew Battel mentioned the existence of the animal, under the name Pongo:

This Pongo is in all proportion like a man, but... he is more like a Giant in stature, than a man: for he is very tall, [and] hath a man's face, hollow-eyed, with long haire vpon his browes. His face and eares are without haire, and his hands also. His bodie is full of haire, but not very thicke, and it is a dunnish colour. . . Hee goeth alwaies vpon his legs, and carrieth his hands clasped on the nape of his necke, when he goeth upon the ground... They goe many together, and kill many Negroes that trauaile in the Woods . . . Those Pongos are neuer taken aliue, because they are so strong, that ten men cannot hold one of them...

— Andrew Battel, 1625

A century and a half after Battel's story was published, one writer called Radermacher wrote that "the large species, described by Buffon and other authors as of the size of a man, is held by many to be a Chimera."

The American physician and missionary Thomas Staughton Savage and naturalist Jeffries Wyman first described the western gorilla in 1847 from specimens obtained in Liberia. They called it Troglodytes gorilla, using the then-current name of the chimpanzee genus. The species name was derived from Ancient Greek Γόριλλαι (gorillai) 'name of a tribe of hairy women', as described by Hanno.

== Evolution and classification ==
The closest relatives of gorillas are the other two Homininae genera, chimpanzees and humans, all of them having diverged from a common ancestor about 7 million years ago. Human gene sequences differ only 1.6% on average from the sequences of corresponding gorilla genes, but there is further difference in how many copies each gene has.

Phylogeny of superfamily Hominoidea

- Hominoidea
  - gibbons (family Hylobatidae, 20 species)
  - - orangutans (genus Pongo, 3 species)
    - - gorillas (genus Gorilla, 2 species)
      - - humans (genus Homo, 1 species)
        - chimpanzees (genus Pan, 2 species)

Until recently, gorillas were considered to be a single species, with three subspecies: the western lowland gorilla, the eastern lowland gorilla and the mountain gorilla. There is now agreement that there are two species, each with two subspecies. More recently, a third subspecies has been claimed to exist in one of the species. The separate species and subspecies developed from a single type of gorilla during the Ice Age, when their forest habitats shrank and became isolated from each other. Primatologists continue to explore the relationships between various gorilla populations. The species and subspecies listed here are the ones upon which most scientists agree.

Genus Gorilla – Geoffroy, 1852 – two species
Common name	Scientific name and subspecies	Range	Size and ecology	IUCN status and estimated population
Eastern gorilla	G. beringei Matschie, 1903 Two subspecies: G. b. beringei (Mountain gorilla); G. b. graueri (Eastern lowland gorilla)	Central Africa	Size: 160–196 cm (63–77 in) long Habitat: Forest Diet: Roots, leaves, stems, and pith, as well as bark, wood, flowers, fruit, fungi, galls, invertebrates, and gorilla dung	CR 2,600
Western gorilla	G. gorilla (Savage, 1847) Two subspecies: G. g. diehli (Cross River gorilla); G. g. gorilla (Western lowland gorilla)	Western Africa	Size: 130–185 cm (51–73 in) long Habitat: Forest Diet: Leaves, berries, ferns, and fibrous bark	CR Unknown

The proposed third subspecies of Gorilla beringei, which has not yet received a trinomen, is the Bwindi population of the mountain gorilla, sometimes called the Bwindi gorilla.

Some variations that distinguish the classifications of gorilla include varying density, size, hair colour, length, culture, and facial widths. Population genetics of the lowland gorillas suggest that the western and eastern lowland populations diverged around 261 thousand years ago.

== Anatomy and physiology ==
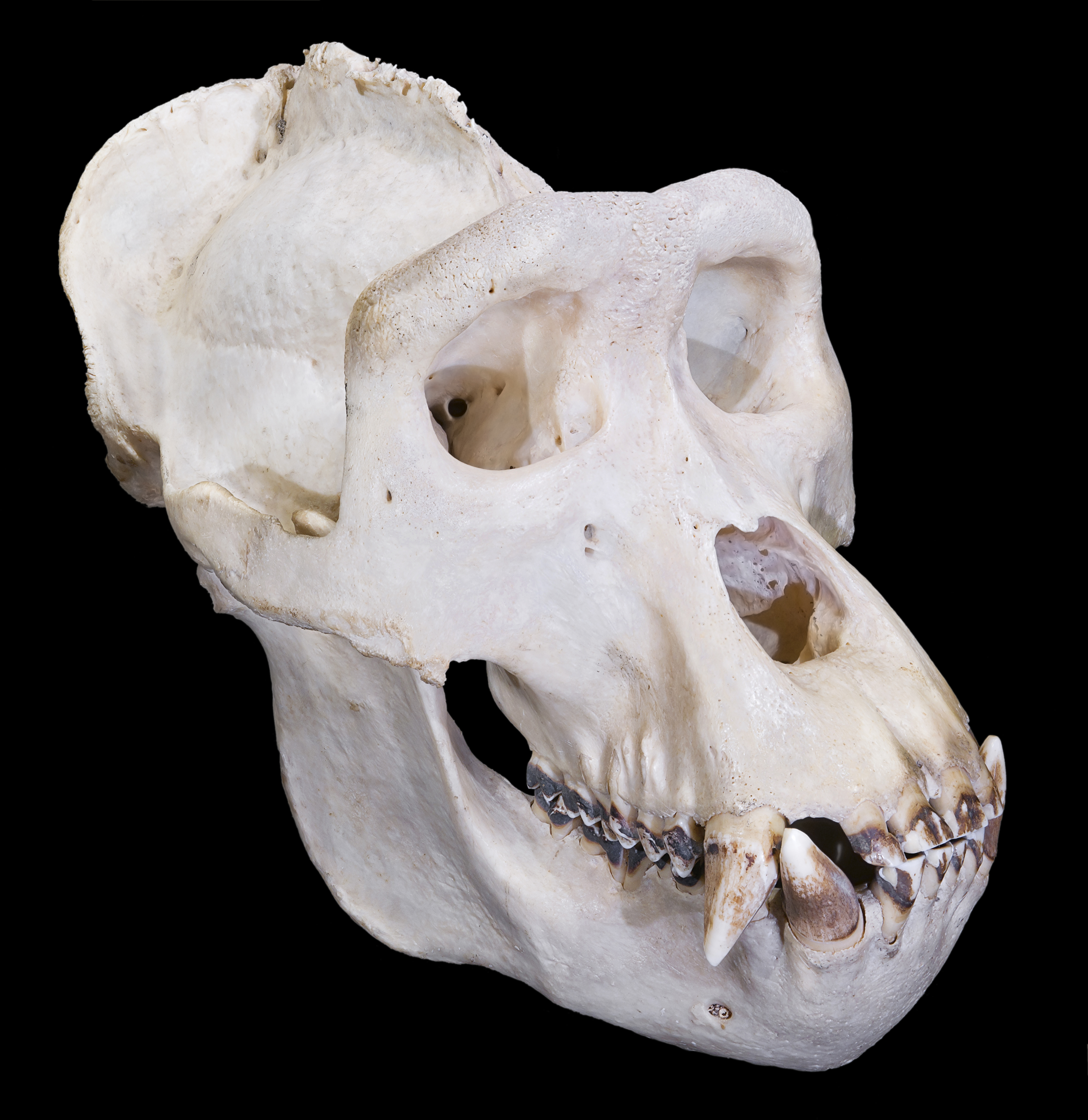
A male gorilla skull

Gorillas are the largest extant primates. They exhibit sexual dimorphism in body size, as males weigh twice as much as females. On average, adult male gorillas weigh between 136 and 227 kg (300 and 500 lb), while females weigh between 68 and 113 kg (150 and 250 lb). Adult males are 1.4 to 1.8 m (4 ft 7 in to 5 ft 11 in) tall, with arm spans that range between 2.3 and 2.6 m (7 ft 7 in and 8 ft 6 in), whereas females are shorter at 1.25 to 1.5 m (4 ft 1 in to 4 ft 11 in) tall. The arm span exceeds an individual's stature, being about 170% of the body length. The intermembral index is 115. The tallest recorded wild gorilla was a 1.95 m (6 ft 5 in) silverback with an arm span of 2.7 m (8 ft 10 in), a chest breadth of 1.98 m (6 ft 6 in), and a weight of 219 kg (483 lb), that was shot in Kivu, Democratic Republic of the Congo, in 1938. The heaviest wild gorilla recorded was a 1.83 m (6 ft 0 in) silverback shot in Ambam, Cameroon, which weighed 267 kg (589 lb). The tallest recorded gorilla in captivity was Gust, a western lowland gorilla that lived at the Antwerp Zoo that was 2.20 m (7 ft 3 in) tall. Males in captivity can be overweight and reach weights up to 310 kg (683 lb).

Gorillas exhibit profound sexual dimorphism in skull shape. Males possesses a tall sagittal crest that is accompanied by a similarly dimorphic occipital crest, although female are known to rarely exhibit similar cranial crests. The sizes of the canine teeth are also sexually dimorphic, as males' are much larger than females'. Gorillas follow the cercopithecoid dental formula of 2.1.2.32.1.2.3 × 2 = 32. The crowns of the incisors are curved lingually. There is a diastema between the maxillary posterior incisor (I^{2}) and the maxillary canine (C^{–}) to accommodate the size of the mandibular canine (C_{–}). The mandibular dentition possesses a canine/P_{3} honing complex via a tapering enamel surface atop the mesial aspect of the mandibular anterior premolar (P_{3}), which hones the maxillary canine. The molar cusps are sharply defined. The neck is thick, owing to the presence of tall spinous processes atop the cervical vertebrae. The vertebral formula is 7 cervicals, 13 thoracics, 4 lumbars, 6 sacrals, and 3 caudals. The digits of the hands are robust, with the thumb being relatively short and not fully opposable. The hallux of the foot is shorter and held in a more abducted position in G. gorilla than in G. beringei.

Adult males are endowed with a conical pad of fibro-fatty tissue atop the crown of the head. Gorillas' nasal openings are variable in shape and size, such that they can be used to identify individual animals. The ears are relatively small, and are held flat against the sides of the head. Callosities known as "friction skin" cover the contact zones of the dorsal aspects of the knuckles that facilitate gorillas' knuckle-walking method of locomotion. Like humans, gorillas have individual fingerprints. Females exhibit slight sexual swellings during oestrus.

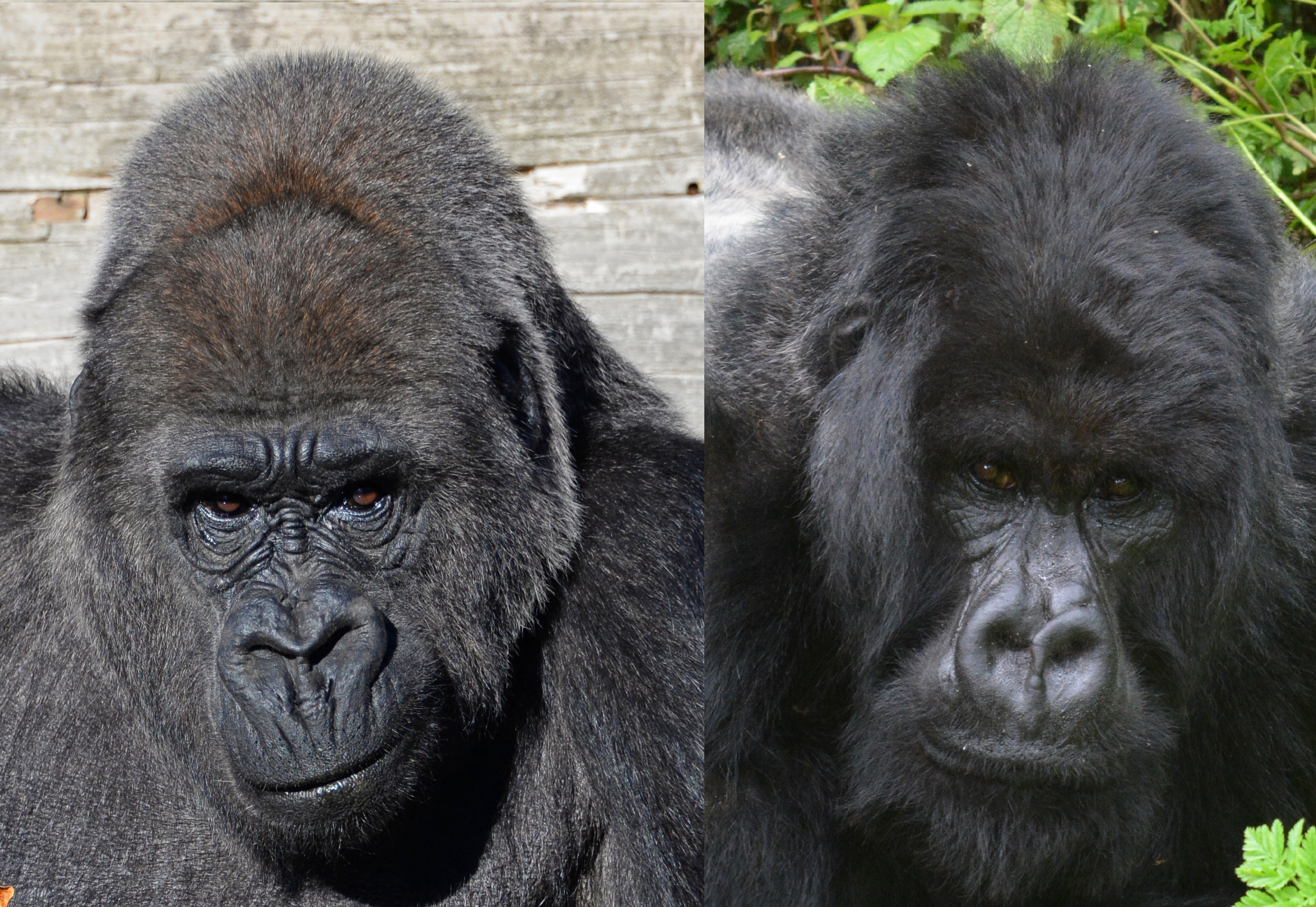
Western gorilla (Gorilla gorilla) and eastern gorilla (Gorilla beringei)

The colouration of the pelage varies from dull grey to black. Among males, the pelage on the back greys with age. Eastern lowland and mountain gorillas are wholly black with the exception of the silvering of adult males, while the western lowland gorilla is brown-grey with a brownish crown, and exhibits a similar silvering pattern. The silvering of adult male eastern lowland gorillas is restricted to a saddle-shaped area on the back, while it extends to the hips among mountain gorillas, and to the rump and legs among western lowland gorillas. The mountain gorilla has the longest fur among gorilla subspecies. The face is glabrescent, with the exception of the hairy cheeks. Gorillas have dark skin.

Studies have shown gorilla blood is not reactive to anti-A and anti-B monoclonal antibodies, which would, in humans, indicate type O blood. Due to novel sequences, it is different enough to not conform with the human ABO blood group system, into which the other great apes fit. Like other non-human great apes, gorillas have a somatic number of 2n = 48.

Although gorillas usually locomote by knuckle-walking, they sometimes walk upright for short distances, typically while carrying food or in defensive situations. A 2018 study investigating the hand posture of 77 mountain gorillas at Bwindi Impenetrable National Park found that knuckle walking was done only 60% of the time, and they also supported their weight on their fists, the backs of their hands/feet, and on their palms/soles (with the digits flexed). Such a range of hand postures was previously thought to have been used by only orangutans. Studies of gorilla handedness have yielded varying results, with some arguing for no preference for either hand, and others right-hand dominance for the general population.

Gorillas typically live between 35 and 40 years, although captive individuals may live for 50 years or more in rare circumstances. At 69 years, 325 days, Fatou is the oldest known living gorilla. The oldest recorded male gorilla was Ozoum, who lived to be 61 years and 24 days.

== Distribution and habitat ==
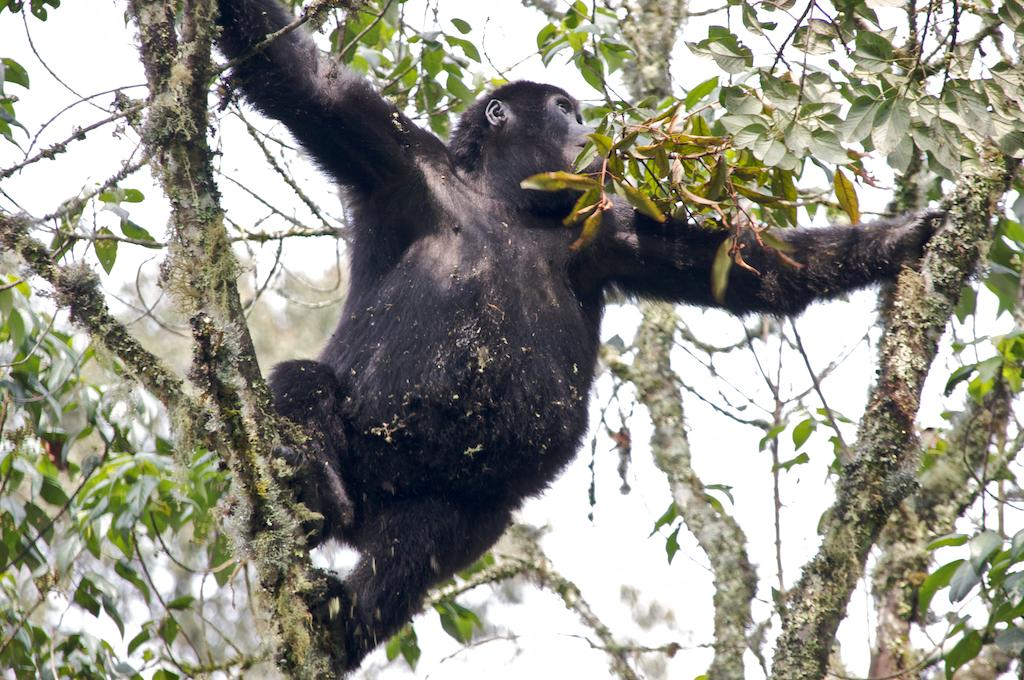
A young gorilla climbing

Gorillas occur between 6°30' N and 5°30' S, with the exception of a 900 km (560 mi) gap between the ranges of the western G. gorilla and the eastern G. beringei species. The western lowland gorilla is found in swamps and rainforests beneath 1,000 m (3,300 ft) above sea level throughout the 709,000 km^{2} (274,000 sq mi) western equatorial forest of Africa. Its range is bounded by the Oubangui, Sanaga, and lower Congo rivers. The eastern lowland gorilla is found in lowland and montane bamboo forests 650–2,600 m (2,130–8,530 ft) above sea level across a 112,000 km^{2} (43,000 sq mi) range bounded by the Lualaba, Lindi, and Luama rivers, and the eastern Albertine Rift. The Cross River and mountain gorillas occur at higher elevations than their subspecific counterparts; the Cross River gorilla occurs 150–1,600 m (490–5,250 ft) above sea level in a 750 km^{2} (290 sq mi) area of low-lying and submontane forests about 260 km (160 mi) northwest of the western lowland gorilla's range, and the mountain gorilla lives as high as 4,000 m (13,000 ft) above sea level in the Virunga Mountains and Bwindi Impenetrable Forest.

The average population density is between 0.5 and 1.5 gorillas/km^{2}, though densities as high as 10.6 gorillas/km^{2} and as low as 0.05 gorillas/km^{2} have been reported. Populations are frequently concentrated alongside rivers and the boundaries of forests. Preferred habitats include low-altitude swamps adjacent to forests, glades, meadows, and high-altitude forest clearings.

== Ecology ==
=== Movements and activity patterns ===
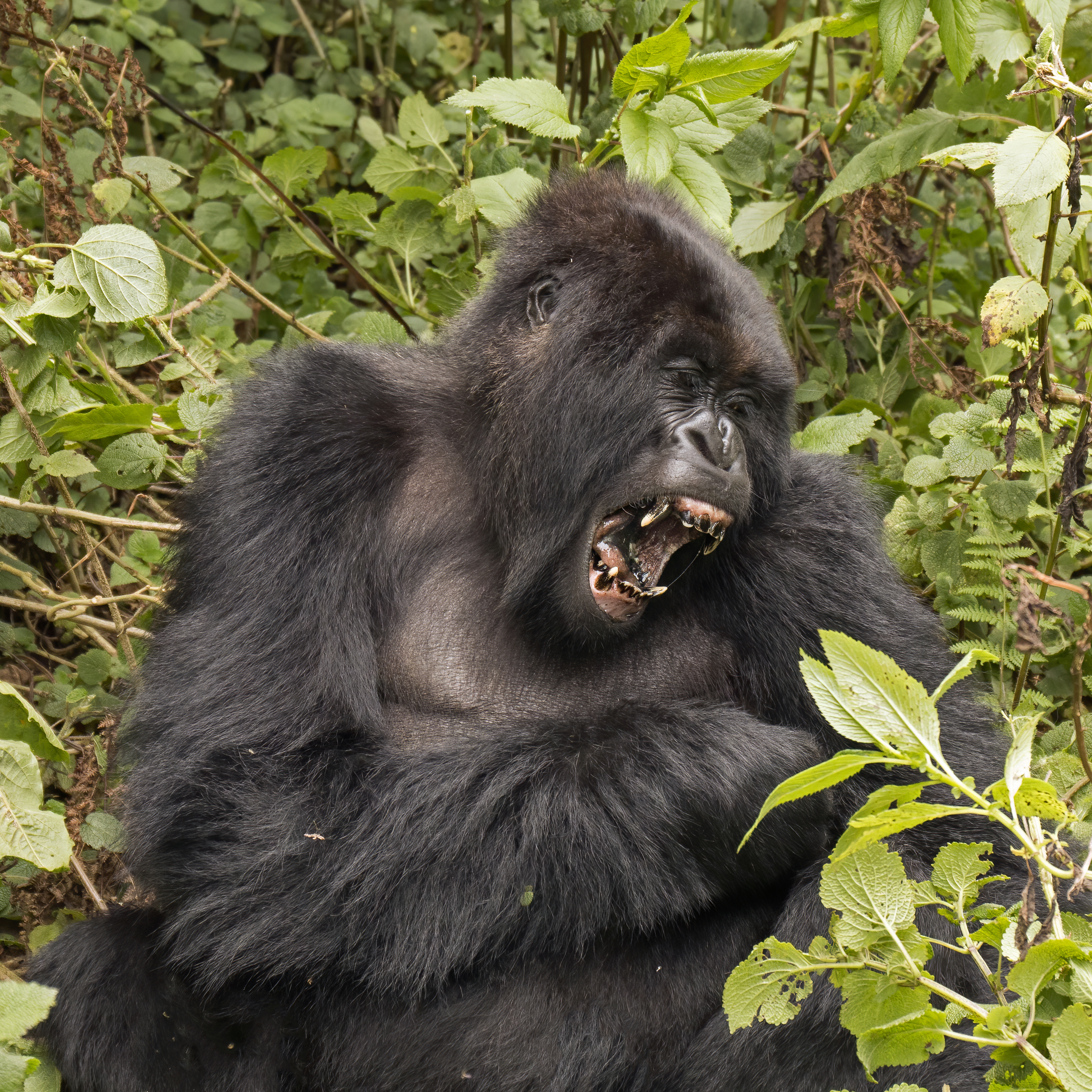
Female mountain gorilla yawning

Western lowland gorilla foraging

Gorillas are partly arboreal and perform most of their activities during the day. In the western lowland subspecies, the day is divided between bouts of feeding and traveling, with the most rigorous feeding session occurring during the morning hours. Feeding in mountain gorillas is restricted to the morning hours and resting occurs during the afternoon. Compared to eastern gorillas, western gorillas are less social and travel greater distances. During the day, eastern gorillas devote the same amount of time to eating and to resting, except during heavy or long rains when they discontinue eating and seek shelter. Most daytime activities occur on the ground.

Mountain gorillas in Virunga have home ranges of 5 to 11 km^{2} (1.9 to 4.2 sq mi) whereas populations in Bwindi have larger home ranges of up to 40 km^{2} (15 sq mi). Greater fruit abundance in Bwindi compared to Virunga explains the difference in home ranges; to locate favored fruits, gorillas in Bwindi expand more energy. Home ranges for eastern lowland gorillas in montane forests is 13–17 km^{2} (5.0–6.6 sq mi). Western gorillas have home ranges (that may intersect with that of other groups) greater than 20 km^{2} (7.7 sq mi). In some cases, groups cross paths and may fight violently.

For sleep during the night, gorillas, like other great apes, build a shelter called a nest. Nest building in western lowland gorillas involves cutting and shaping foliage, particularly Aframomum species, then placing it under and over their bodies. Branches are folded when building tree nests so the center space can be used for foliage placement. Tree nests are preffered more by smaller individuals than by large males. Factors affecting the types of nests built include rain patterns, food availability and interspecific interactions with elephants. Eastern gorillas also cut and shape foliage of grasses and herbs for nest building purposes. Most nests are build on the ground, though eastern lowland gorilla populations in lowlands have been known to build tree nests 40 per cent of the time, perhaps due to higher tree density in lowlands compared to highlands. Nests may also be used as a resting place during the day. Western gorillas can swing from tree to tree using only their arms and walk on tree branches with all four limbs. The western lowland subspecies are more adept climbers than mountain gorillas, possessing longer and larger limbs, shorter fingers and wide shoulder blades. Male western gorillas generally spend less time climbing than females. Gorillas move about primarily by knuckle-walking but can sometimes stand and walk briefly on two legs.

For only a couple of days to a few weeks of the year, fruits in lowland forests are produced by individual trees, though the overall diversity of fruits is high in these habitats. Western gorillas may therefore struggle to forage effectively, particularly for the less concentrated fruits. Due to their large size and wide guts which allow for effective absorption through food retention, western gorillas are able to live off dietary fiber and ferment these foods. Anaerobic protozoans in the colon, such as entodiniomorphs, help break down cellulose. Eastern gorillas possess similar gut morphology. Gorillas do not make use of tools when trying to access food sources but instead rely on their strength. This allows western gorillas to feed off fruits other frugivores cannot access. They can use both hands to access foods, such as nettles, which have spines.

Gorillas and chimpanzees coexist in many parts of their respective distributions. Eastern gorillas do not compete with the chimpanzee for resources despite there being an overlap in their diets. On the contrary, western lowland gorillas and chimpanzees may harrass and displace each other whenever a group advantage exists; the two apes also eat many of the same foods. However, in Goualougo, Republic of Congo, western lowland gorillas and chimpanzees are frequently present in the same foraging areas for about 46 minutes at a time.

=== Diet ===
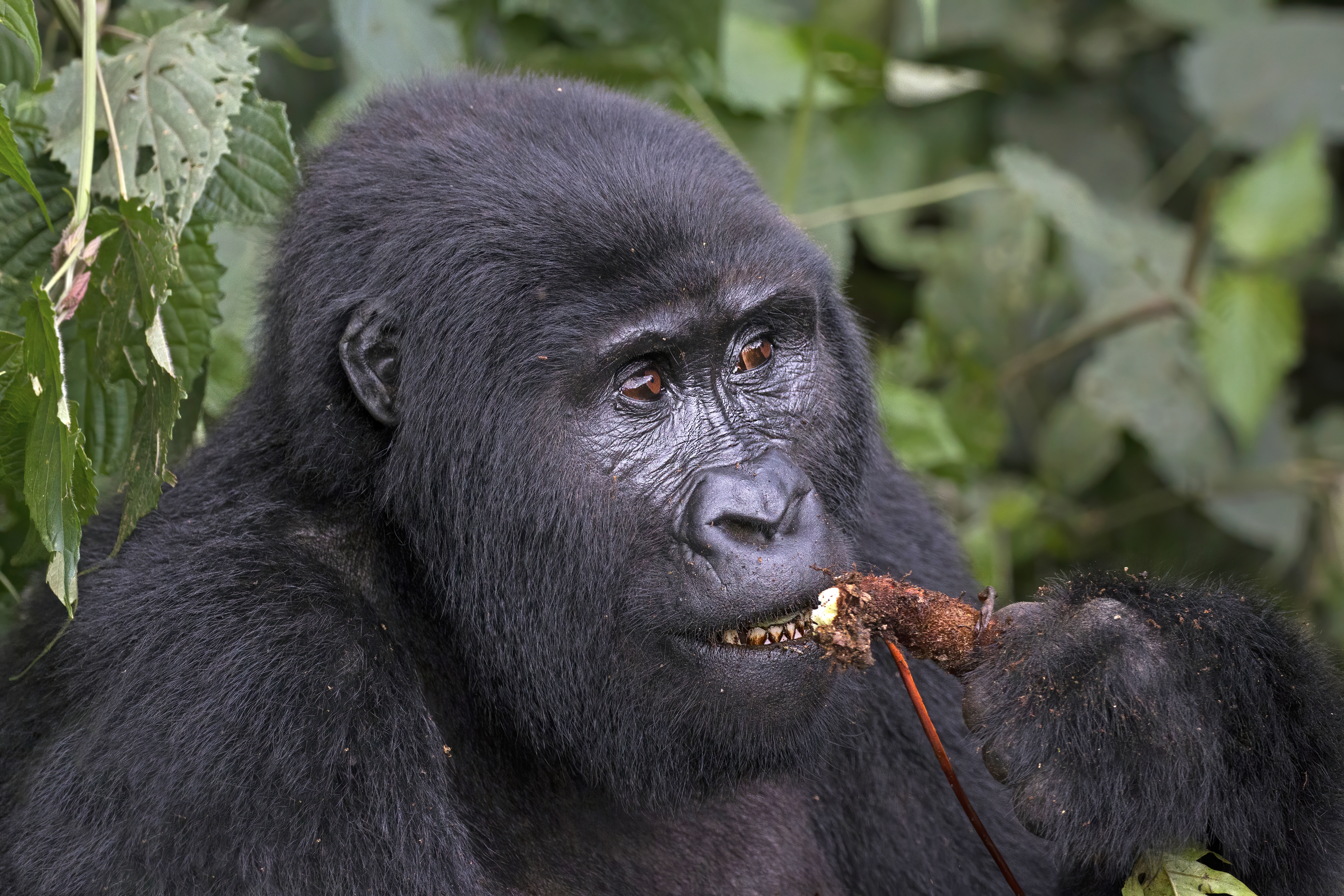
Female mountain gorilla in Bwindi feeding on a plant root

Gorillas are large herbivorous mammals. Western gorillas primarily consume the fruits, roots, stems, and leaves of various plant species including but not limited to Marantaceae, Arecaceae, Zingiberaceae and Commelinaceae. They prioritize protein over dietary fiber, or sugar over tannin when filtering their foods. However, if fruit supply runs short, western gorillas rely on the vegetative parts of plants to survive, prioritizing dietary fiber over protein. The few fruits that are consumed during this period contain more fiber but less fruit juice and sugar. Western gorillas may actively forage for certain, hard-to-find fruits, but when fruits become scarce, less nutritious plants and fruits are consumed, as western gorillas travel less during foraging expeditions.

The diet of the mountain gorilla population in Virunga national park consists of vines, shrubs, and herbs, whereas the Bwindi population subsist largely on fruits. According to a study in Karisoke Research Center, the diet of mountain gorillas includes 38 species of celery, nettle, thistle and gallium vine. Mountain gorillas also consume bamboo, a high protein plant, in large quantities whenever it is in large numbers. Eastern lowland gorillas consume the bark, leaves, stems, and fruits of numerous plant species. In Kahuzi-Biega, eastern lowland gorillas rely mostly on herbaceous plants when fruit becomes rare, and switch to a more sedentary lifestyle.

Insects, mostly ants and termites, are consumed by western and eastern lowland gorillas. Mountain gorillas on the other hand, rarely consume insects.

=== Mortality ===
Mountain gorillas have been recorded reaching over 40 years in the wild and captive gorillas over 50 years. Gorillas have few predators because of their large size, though leopards are known predators of gorillas. In both gorilla species, females and young are protected from danger by the dominant male. Killings by humans account for the largest percentage of gorilla deaths due to predation. Poaching, subsistence hunting and revenge for crop damage are some of the reasons behind these killings.

Gorillas are susceptible to infections and disease by microorganisms and parasites such as amoeba, Sarcoptes, Chilomastix, Cyclospora, Endolimax, Oesophagostomum, and Capillaria. Human diseases such as ebola, influenza, pneumonia, measles, rubella, hepatitis, tuberculosis, whooping cough, among others may also affect gorillas.

== Behaviour ==
=== Social structure ===
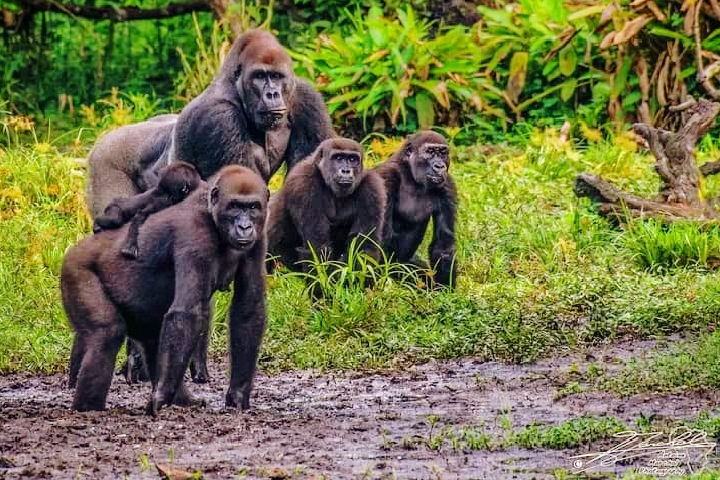
A gorilla troop

Gorilla troops typically consist of eight to eleven individuals, namely a dominant silverback male, three to four females and their young. Sometimes, males form all-male alliances or more commonly they remain with their natal troop after sexual maturity. These multi-male groups occur most frequently in mountain gorillas. In troops where males remain after sexual maturity, sharing of mating responsibilities may occur by the time males develop silverbacks. In eastern areas, males typically leave their natal troop but may do so differently: some males leave alone and later draw attention from females, while others leave with a cohort of males and yet others leave with females. Despite the potential risk of infanticide, rearing females are known to move between groups. Non-rearing females sometimes display the same behavior. Reasons for why females move between groups include a natural tendency to partake in the behavior, personality or the death of the dominant male. Females in multi-male groups typically stay after the death of a dominant silverback because they have grown accustomed to his eventual successor.

Apart from females and their young, there are weak social bonds between individuals of a troop. Interactions between the dominant silverback and young gorillas increase until the latter nears adulthood. Male and female gorillas interact in a variety of ways. When a dispute between members of the same sex breaks out, an individual of the opposite sex may break up the dispute though not with a lot of force. Males perform more interventions than females; this behavior may consolidate male dominance. In some cases, males may become hostile to females, though they can also appease to their female counterparts. The pecking order of males ensures that dominant silverbacks and subordinate males interact little. Even among males of similar rank, interactions are limited and social bonds are weak. Despite their weak social bonds, males sometimes intercept dispersing females by working together. There are no records of group usurpation in gorillas.

In western gorillas, females are mostly found in troops with fewer members, whereas female mountain gorillas predominantly live in multi-male troops of any size. Male western gorillas are more successful trying to establish their own troop because of female selection of smaller groups. Eastern gorilla troops are considered fission-fusion societies where members leave and join groups.

=== Reproduction and parenting ===
Mountain gorillas with young

2-year-old mountain gorilla young playing

Dominant males in multi-male groups usually mate with the most fertile females and interrupt mating sessions between subordinate males and subfertile adolescent females. In this way, both subordinate and dominant males father offspring. Male and female gorillas almost always mate with members of the same group. In some cases, female mountain gorillas mate with multiple partners. A male gorilla will mate with all receptive females in a group only if he is the only adult male.

In contrast to mountain gorillas which can breed throughout the year, most eastern lowland gorilla young are born in a short period from May to July. Female eastern lowland gorillas have menstrual cycles lasting 33.2 days. Western lowland gorillas in captivity have a menstrual cycle lasting 24 to 42 days. For 1 to 4 days in a 28-day cycle, female mountain gorillas are in heat and mate when estrogen levels are close to its highest. Female gorillas usually give birth to a single young and occasionally twins, after a gestation of 257 days. The eastern lowland gorilla gives birth every 4.2 years, whereas the western gorilla has an average birth interval of 5.2 years.

During their first 3 years, mortality rates for young mountain and eastern lowland gorillas are 34% and 26%, respectively. Newborns are helpless and rely totally on their mothers to survive the first three years of life. Females carry newborns on their bellies for the first few months; the young hangs on to the mother's fur as she moves around. By one to two months, young gorillas are carried on their mother's back. Climbing begins at 6 to 12 months. Young gorillas from about 6 months slowly detach from their mothers and at 9 months they begin playing until adolescence. Nest building, usually of poor quality, occurs at 18 months, though young eastern gorillas continue using their mother's nest for another 18 months. Young are weaned by at most 4 years in the eastern gorilla, and at 5 to 6 years in the eastern gorilla. By the age ten, male gorillas reach sexual maturity but will continue growing until age 15 in eastern gorillas and 18 in western gorillas, at which point they develop the characteristic silverback. Sexual maturity in female mountain gorillas occurs at six or seven years. For 2 years before the age of first copulation, female mountain gorillas sexually explore with potential suitors.

=== Communication ===
Grooming is rare in mountain gorillas, though when it does occur, most cases involve males and females, with the latter initiating most sessions. Similarly, vocalization occurs primarily between females and the dominant male. Daily movements of the troop is controlled by the dominant male. Usually after resting, males signal the group to move in a particular direction through visual displays. Males may trail behind females whenever the group travels.

In Karisoke, extensive research has been done on mountain gorilla vocalizations. The vocal repertoire of adult males is more extensive than that of adult females, and male vocalizations are more common than female vocalizations. Chest-beats and long distance calls are performed by males during interactions with other groups possibly to signal strength and vitality. When male gorillas beat their chest (which has specialized laryngeal air sacs), a resonance is produced. In close distances, both sexes perform vocalizations including but not limited to "grumbles", "aggressive signals", and "grunts"; "grumbles" and "grunts" are the most used vocalizations and are usually emitted after another gorilla vocalizes. The "double grunt" may be used to facilitate group movement, illicit reactions, and "notify others of the caller's intention to resume feeding".

In a 2015 study in Mondika Research Center, 17 vocalizations were recorded for the western gorilla. The "sex-whinny" is the only vocalization unique to the western gorilla, as the other 16 are shared with the mountain gorilla. "Grunts", "grumbles", "hums", "singing", "whinnies", "whimpers", and "chuckles" are emitted at short distances. Other sounds such as "adult screams", "high frequency infant cries", "barks", "roars", and "hooting" are emitted at long distances. During the reproductive season, "copulation grunts" and "sex-whinnies" are emitted, whereas "cough-grunts" and "screams" are produced during aggressive displays. Vocalizations by infants such as "infant whimpers" and "infant cries" are released when lactating. When threatened and foraging, "barks" and "humming and singing" are emitted, respectively. Gorillas "chuckle" when they play.

== Intelligence ==
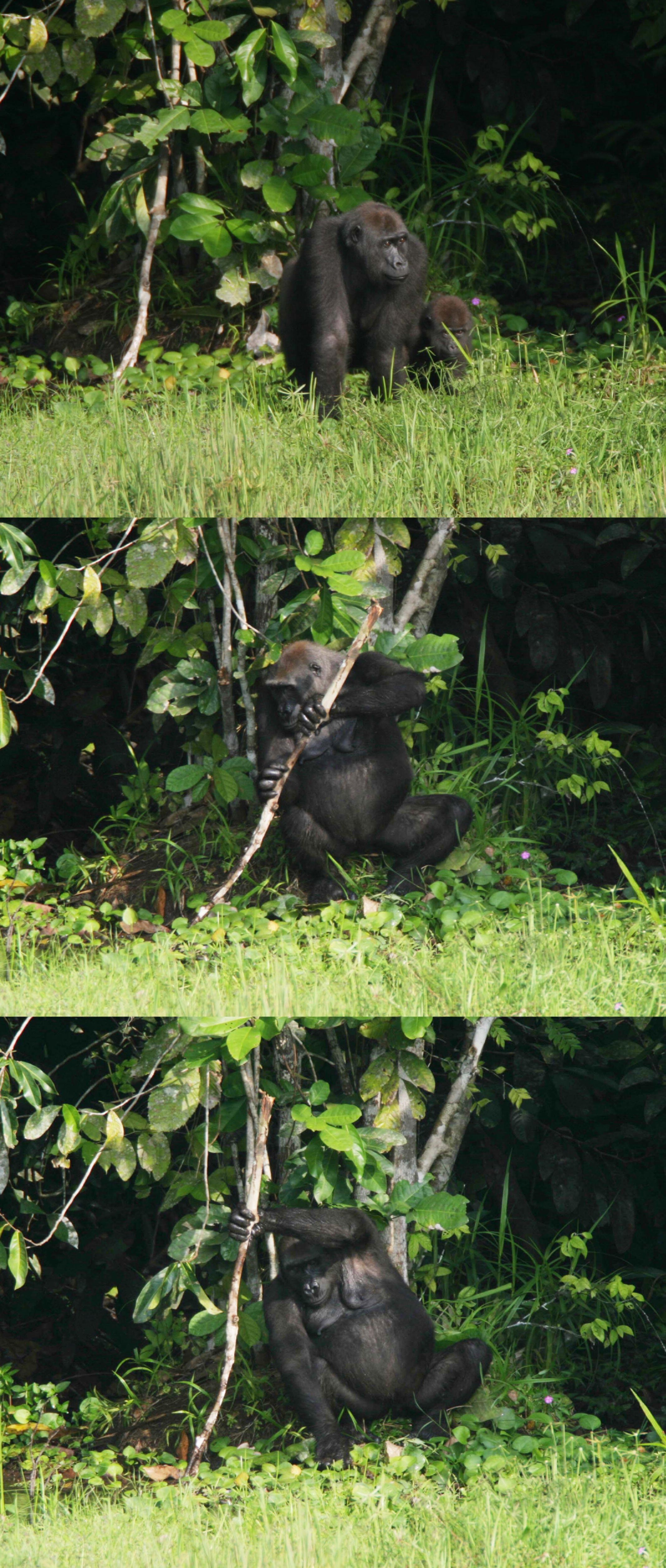
A female gorilla exhibiting tool use by using a tree trunk as a support whilst fishing herbs

Gorillas are considered highly intelligent. Western gorillas require greater cognitive use when foraging than eastern gorillas because the lowland tropical forests they inhabit produce a wide variety of fruit that last a short period on individual trees each year. The naturalistic intelligence, as well as the memory and mental mapping capabilities of chimpanzees and western gorillas are comparable. Contrary to other great apes, gorillas have repeatedly failed to show self-recognition in mirror tests. They typically avoid looking at their mirror reflections possibly due to the fact that in gorilla communication eye contact is viewed as a threat. Gorillas and other great apes are known to produce "laughing" sounds when tickled or playing; these sounds are thought to have originated in the last common ancestor of the great apes and not in humans.

Attempts to both teach language to gorillas and study how they learn and attain language began in 1972, when a year old female gorilla named Koko became subjected to American sign language taught in spoken English on a regular basis. Over the years, Koko expanded her vocabulary at a similar pace to that of a human toddler with delayed cognitive development, and her vocabulary eventually plateued to that of a typical human child.

=== Tool use ===
A team led by Thomas Breuer of the Wildlife Conservation Society in September 2005 observed a female gorilla in the Nouabalé-Ndoki National Park in the Republic of Congo using a stick as if to gauge the depth of water whilst crossing a swamp. A second female was seen using a tree stump as a bridge and also as a support whilst fishing in the swamp. In the same month, a two-and-a-half-year-old gorilla in the Republic of Congo was discovered using rocks to smash open palm nuts inside a game sanctuary.

== Scientific study ==
American physician and missionary Thomas Staughton Savage obtained the first specimens (the skull and other bones) during his time in Liberia. The first scientific description of gorillas from near the river Gaboon dates back to an article by Savage and the naturalist Jeffries Wyman in 1847 in Proceedings of the Boston Society of Natural History, where Troglodytes gorilla is described, now known as the western gorilla. Other species of gorilla were described in the next few years.

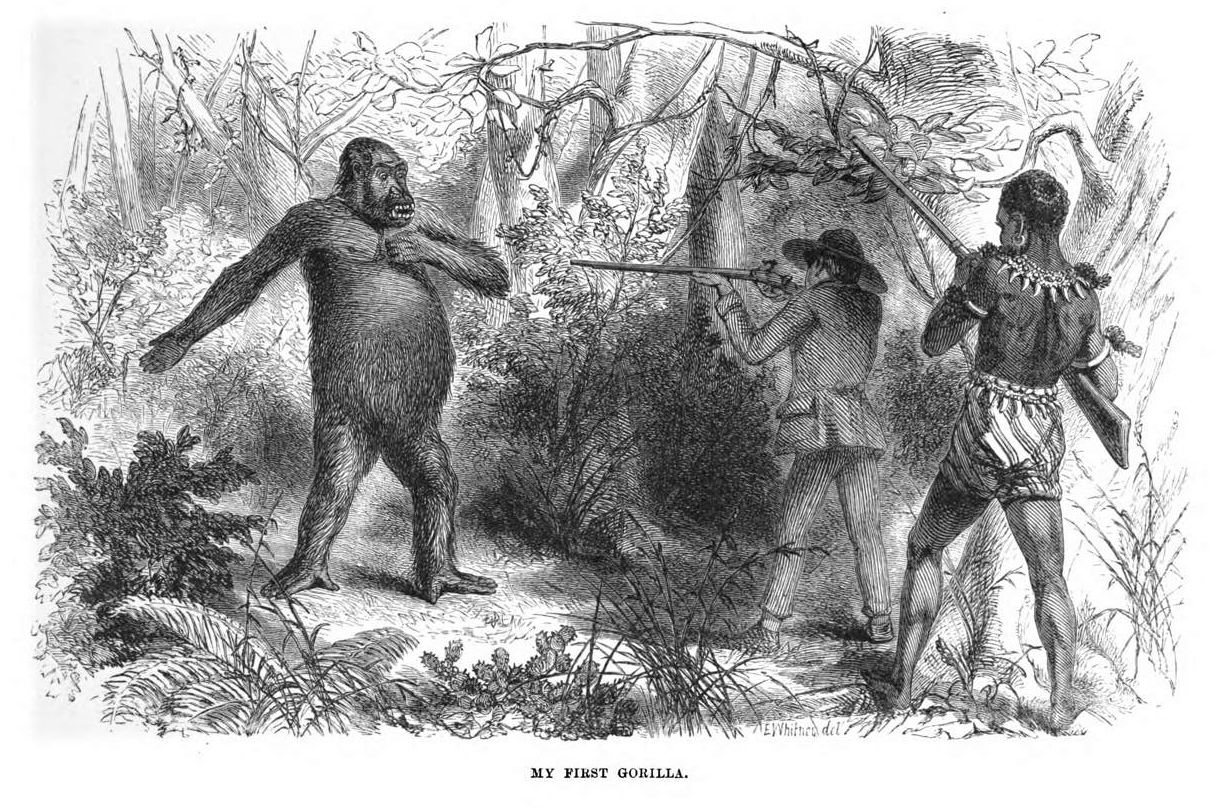
A drawing of French explorer Paul Du Chaillu at close quarters with a gorilla

The explorer Paul Du Chaillu was the first westerner to see a live gorilla during his travel through western equatorial Africa from 1856 to 1859. He brought dead specimens to the UK in 1861.

The first systematic study was not conducted until the 1920s, when Carl Akeley of the American Museum of Natural History traveled to Africa to hunt for an animal to be shot and stuffed. On his first trip, he was accompanied by his friends Mary Bradley, a mystery writer, her husband, and their young daughter Alice, who would later write science fiction under the pseudonym James Tiptree Jr. After their trip, Mary Bradley wrote On the Gorilla Trail. She later became an advocate for the conservation of gorillas, and wrote several more books (mainly for children). In the late 1920s and early 1930s, Robert Yerkes and his wife Ava helped further the study of gorillas when they sent Harold Bigham to Africa. Yerkes also wrote a book in 1929 about the great apes.

After World War II, George Schaller was one of the first researchers to go into the field and study primates. In 1959, he conducted a systematic study of the mountain gorilla in the wild and published his work. Years later, at the behest of Louis Leakey and the National Geographic, Dian Fossey conducted a much longer and more comprehensive study of the mountain gorilla. When she published her work, many misconceptions and myths about gorillas were finally disproved, including the myth that gorillas are violent.

Western lowland gorillas (G. g. gorilla) are believed to be one of the zoonotic origins of HIV/AIDS. The SIVgor Simian immunodeficiency virus that infects them is similar to a certain strain of HIV-1.

=== Genome sequencing ===
The gorilla became the next-to-last great ape genus to have its genome sequenced. The first gorilla genome was generated with short read and Sanger sequencing with DNA from a female western lowland gorilla named Kamilah. This gave scientists further insight into the evolution and origin of humans. Although chimpanzees being the closest extant relatives of humans, 15% of the human genome was found to be more similar to that of the gorilla. In addition, 30% of the gorilla genome "is closer to human or chimpanzee than the latter are to each other; this is rarer around coding genes, indicating pervasive selection throughout great ape evolution, and has functional consequences in gene expression." Analysis of the gorilla genome has cast doubt on the idea that the rapid evolution of hearing genes gave rise to language in humans, as it also occurred in gorillas.

Several western lowland gorillas in captivity in Japan, 2009

== Captivity ==
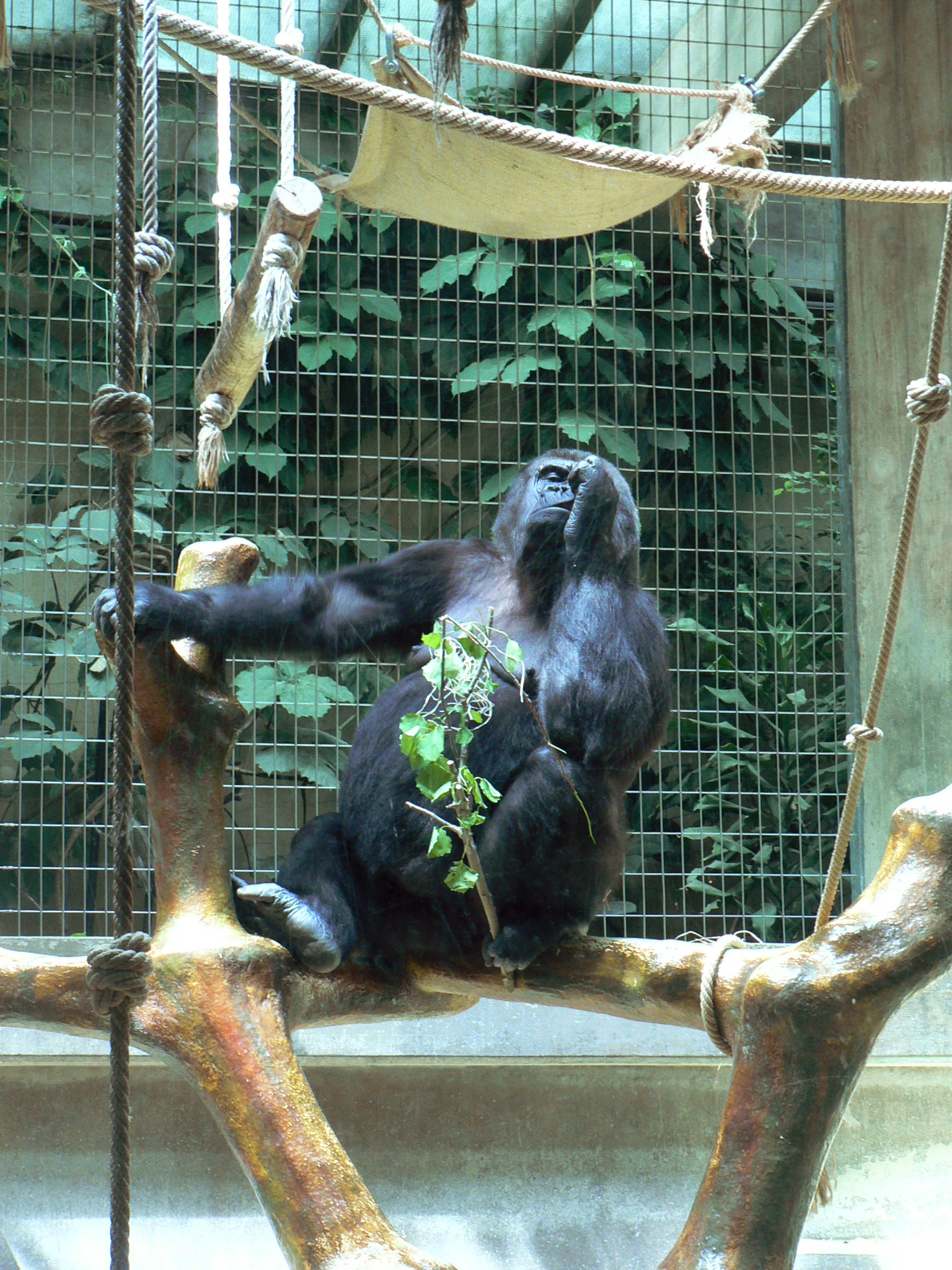
A gorilla at the Basel Zoo

Gorillas became highly prized by western zoos since the 19th century, though the earliest attempts to keep them in captive facilities ended in their early death. In the late 1920s, the care of captive gorillas significantly improved. Colo (22 December 1956 – 17 January 2017) of the Columbus Zoo and Aquarium was the first gorilla to be born in captivity.

Captive gorillas exhibit stereotypic behaviors, including eating disorders—such as regurgitation, reingestion and coprophagy—self-injurious or conspecific aggression, pacing, rocking, sucking of fingers or lip smacking, and overgrooming. Negative vigilance of visitor behaviors have been identified as starting, posturing and charging at visitors. Groups of bachelor gorillas containing young silverbacks have significantly higher levels of aggression and wounding rates than mixed age and sex groups.

The use of both internal and external privacy screens on exhibit windows has been shown to alleviate stresses from visual effects of high crowd densities, leading to decreased stereotypic behaviors in the gorillas. Playing naturalistic auditory stimuli as opposed to classical music, rock music, or no auditory enrichment (which allows for crowd noise, machinery, etc. to be heard) has been noted to reduce stress behavior as well. Enrichment modifications to feed and foraging, where clover-hay is added to an exhibit floor, decrease stereotypic activities while simultaneously increasing positive food-related behaviors.

Recent research on captive gorilla welfare emphasizes a need to shift to individual assessments instead of a one-size-fits-all group approach to understanding how welfare increases or decreases based on a variety of factors. Individual characteristics such as age, sex, personality and individual histories are essential in understanding that stressors will affect each individual gorilla and their welfare differently.

== Conservation status ==
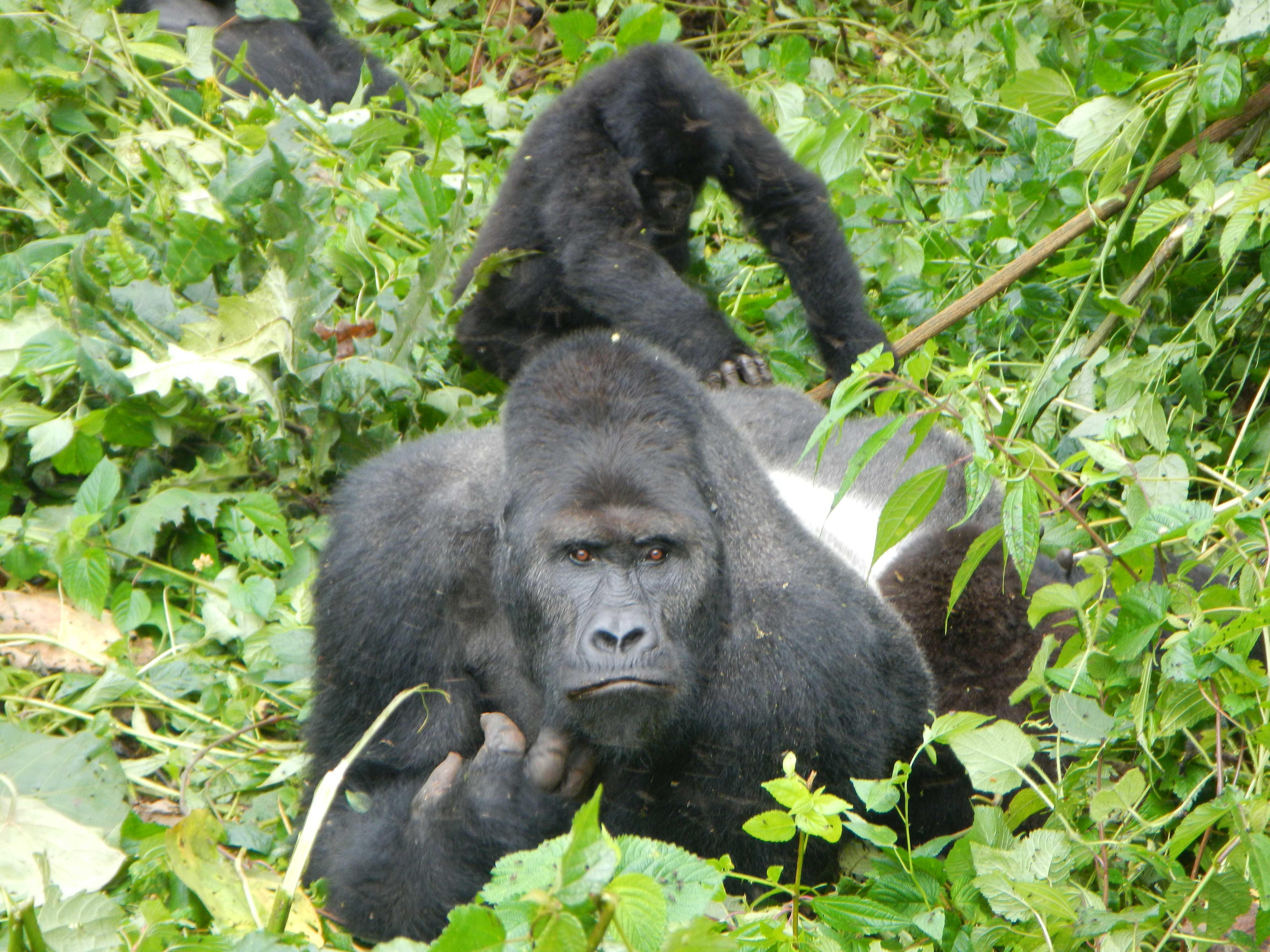
An eastern lowland gorilla in the Kahuzi-Biega National Park, Democratic Republic of the Congo

All species (and subspecies) of gorilla are listed as endangered or critically endangered on the IUCN Red List. All gorillas are listed in Appendix I of the Convention on International Trade in Endangered Species (CITES), meaning that international export/import of the species, including in parts and derivatives, is regulated. In 2016, around 316,000 western lowland gorillas were thought to exist in the wild, 4,000 in zoos, thanks to conservation; eastern lowland gorillas have a population of under 5,000 in the wild and 24 in zoos. Mountain gorillas are the most severely endangered, with an estimated population of about 880 left in the wild and none in zoos.

Threats to gorilla survival include habitat destruction and poaching for the bushmeat trade. Gorillas are closely related to humans, and are susceptible to diseases that humans also get infected by. In 2004, a population of several hundred gorillas in the Odzala National Park, Republic of Congo was essentially wiped out by the Ebola virus.

A 2006 study published in Science concluded more than 5,000 gorillas may have died in recent outbreaks of the Ebola virus in central Africa. The researchers indicated in conjunction with commercial hunting of these apes, the virus creates "a recipe for rapid ecological extinction". In captivity, it has also been observed that gorillas can also be infected with COVID-19.

Conservation efforts include the Great Apes Survival Project, a partnership between the United Nations Environment Programme and the UNESCO, and also an international treaty, the Agreement on the Conservation of Gorillas and Their Habitats, concluded under UNEP-administered Convention on Migratory Species. The Gorilla Agreement is the first legally binding instrument exclusively targeting gorilla conservation; it came into effect in June 2008. Governments of countries where gorillas live placed a ban on their killing and trading, but weak law enforcement still poses a threat to them, since the governments rarely apprehend poachers, traders and consumers that rely on gorillas for profit.

== Cultural significance ==
A 1917 U.S. Army Enlistment propaganda poster representing Germany as a gorilla with a woman as he stomps onto the shore of America

Gorilla depictions outside Africa may go as far back as the mid-to-late 15th century, as indicating by a silk painting thought to originate from Central Asia. In Baka and Akan folklore, farmers are believed to be hybrids between humans and gorillas that later transition fully into gorillas after death. Beliefs about dead farmers remaining in forests and inspiring medicinal and musical ideas in the dreams of the living are held by the Baka. They believe that there is a large overlap in behavioral and physical traits between farmers and gorillas, hence the comparisons. Similarly, the Baka are considered by farmers to be "half-human and half-animal". Consumption of the yellow-backed duiker is avoided by farmers because they consider this animal to be the reincarnated Baka people. The Mbendjele Pygmies of Congo also make comparisons between farmers and gorillas.

In 1911, the anthropologist Albert Jenks noted the Bulu people's knowledge of gorilla behaviour and ecology, and their gorilla stories. In one such story, "The Gorilla and the Child", a gorilla speaks to people, seeking help and trust, and stealing a baby; a man accidentally kills the baby while attacking the gorilla. Even far from where gorillas live, savannah tribes pursue "cult-like worship" of the apes. Some beliefs are widespread among indigenous peoples. The Fang name for gorilla is ngi while the Bulu name is njamong; the root ngi means fire, denoting a positive energy. From the Central African Republic to Cameroon and Gabon, stories of reincarnations as gorillas, totems, and transformations similar to those recorded by Du Chaillu are still told in the 21st century.

Since gaining international attention, gorillas have been a recurring element of many aspects of popular culture and media. They were usually portrayed as murderous and aggressive. Inspired by Emmanuel Frémiet's Gorilla Carrying off a Woman, gorillas have been depicted kidnapping human women. This theme was used in films such as Ingagi (1930) and most notably King Kong (1933).

The comedic play The Gorilla, which debuted in 1925, featured an escaped gorilla taking a woman from her house. Several films used the "escaped gorilla" trope including The Strange Case of Doctor Rx (1942), The Gorilla Man (1943), Gorilla at Large (1954) and the Disney cartoons The Gorilla Mystery (1930) and Donald Duck and the Gorilla (1944).

Gorillas have been used as opponents to jungle-themed heroes such as Tarzan and Sheena, Queen of the Jungle, as well as superheroes. The DC Comics supervillain Gorilla Grodd is an enemy of the Flash. Gorillas also serve as antagonists in the 1968 film Planet of the Apes. More positive and sympathetic portrayals of gorillas include the films Son of Kong (1933), Mighty Joe Young (1949), Gorillas in the Mist (1988) and Instinct (1999) and the 1992 novel Ishmael. Gorillas have been featured in video games as well, notably Donkey Kong.

In American English, the idiom "800-pound gorilla" is a common way to refer to an entity so powerful that it can act without regard to the rights of others or the law. The phrase is rooted in a riddle joke about how a human cannot stop a gorilla:

Q. Where does an 800-pound gorilla sit?
A. Anywhere it wants to.

The term can describe a powerful geopolitical and military force, or, in business, a powerful corporate entity that has such a large majority percentage of whatever market they compete within that they can use that strength to crush would-be competitors. In law, the phrase occurs as a characterization of judges vs. courts; as in: "Standard/Court Rule" vs "Gorilla/Judge Rule". The metaphor has been mixed, on occasion, with the metaphor of the elephant in the room.

== See also ==
- Bili ape
- Gorilla suit
- Great Ape Project
- Harambe – a captive gorilla, shot while interacting with a child who fell into his zoo enclosure, who became a popular internet meme
