= Loss of heterogeneity =

Loss of heterogeneity (not to be confused with loss of heterozygosity) may be a disappearance of heterogeneity of

- Ion channels - see Heterogeneity#Biology
- Genetic variation in a species - see Ecological extinction
