= Baka =

Baka, baká or BAKA may refer to:

== Ethnicities and languages ==
- Baka people (Cameroon and Gabon), an African ethnic group
- Baka people (Congo and South Sudan), an African ethnic group
- Baka language, a dialect cluster of Cameroon and Gabon
- Baka language (South Sudan), a Central Sudanic language of South Sudan

== People with the name ==
- Abdellatif Baka, Algerian Paralympic athlete
- András Baka, Hungarian jurist and politician
  - Baka v. Hungary
- Henock Inonga Baka, Congolese footballer
- Józef Baka, 18th century poet, Jesuit priest and missionary
- Latifa Baka (born 1964), Moroccan author
- Mirosław Baka, Polish actor
- Purna Chandra Baka, Indian politician
- Władysław Baka, Polish economist, politician, and banker
- Ylli Baka, Albanian folk singer and songwriter
- Bikheris or Ba-Ka, Fourth Dynasty Egyptian pharaoh
- Baka (prince), Fourth Dynasty Egyptian prince who might be the above-named Bikheris
- Baka Bai, Maratha royal
- Baka Prase (born 1996), Serbian YouTuber, rapper, gamer and entertainer
- Blaž "Baka" Slišković, Bosnian football manager and player
- Mohamed Arif (1985–2024), Maldivian footballer better known as Baka

== Fictional and mythical characters ==
- Bakasura, a mythical demon in the Mahabharata also known as Baka
- Baka Brahma, a deity in Buddhism - see Brahmā (Buddhism)
- Bākā, a character from Juken Sentai Gekiranger
- Bacá (mythological creature) or Baká, a shape-shifting demon in Dominican Republic folklore
- Cirno, a fictional character from the Touhou Project who is often referred to by its fans and creator as "baka"

== Places ==
- Baka, Burkina Faso, a village in Gnagna Province
- Baka, Iran, a village in Hormozgan Province
- Baka, Jerusalem, a neighborhood in southern Jerusalem
- Baka, Slovakia, a village in Dunajská Streda District
- Bakkah, also transliterated Baka, another name for Mecca, Saudi Arabia
- Baká, one of the municipalities of Nicaragua

== Other uses ==
- Baka (Japanese word), meaning "fool; idiot; foolish"
- Yokosuka MXY-7 Ohka, or Baka, Japanese suicide planes
- BAKA, the Muslim chaplain service of the Royal Malaysian Police
- Baka indigobird (Vidua larvaticola), a variant spelling of barka indigobird, an African species of bird
- Baka, the 1990 debut album of the world-music group Outback (group)

== See also ==
- The Baka Boyz (Nick and Eric Vidal), nationally syndicated radio hosts in the US
- Baka Rangers, a group of Negima! Magister Negi Magi characters
- Bakas, a village in Uttar Pradesh, India
- Amalia Bakas (1897–1979), Greek singer born Mazaltov Matsa
- Rifaiz Bakas (born 1982), Dutch former cricketer
