= Bradnee Chambers =

Canadian environmentalist (1966–2019)

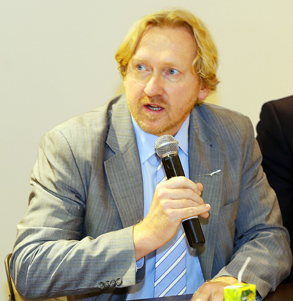
- Born: July 19, 1966
- Died: January 23, 2019 (aged 52)
- Education: University of Edinburgh, University of Nottingham, University of Reading, University of Windsor
- Occupation: Executive Secretary Convention on Migratory Species of Wild Animals
- Predecessor: Elizabeth Mrema

Bradnee Chambers (July 19, 1966 – January 23, 2019) was an expert on international environmental governance, law and politics. In March 2013 he was appointed as the Executive Secretary of the Convention on the Conservation of Migratory Species of Wild Animals (CMS), a main United Nations multilateral conservation treaty He was also the acting Executive Secretary of the Gorilla Agreement and the Agreement on the Conservation of Small Cetaceans in the Baltic, North East Atlantic, Irish and North Seas (ASCOBANS) both administered under the UN Environment Programme. These agreements form the global framework for the conservation of wild animals migrating between countries. The agreements cover an immense scope of wildlife including whales, dolphins, sharks, elephants, big cats (e.g. Cheetahs, snow leopards), bats, monarch butterflies, saiga antelope, waterbirds (e.g. Ducks, geese, flamingoes), and migratory fish (e.g. Sturgeons, the European eel).

Chambers was born in Haliburton, Ontario, Canada. Before joining CMS, he was the Senior Legal Officer and Chief of the Law and Governance Branch of UNEP. An important part of UNEP is responsible for developing international environmental law, providing capacity building and technical guidance on governance and legal issues to developing countries. Chambers has been a frequent contributor to international environmental governance reform and processes either through his exploration of new concepts of law and governance through his many writings or through offering alternative options for developing international environmental reforms.

In 2010 Chambers led the International Environmental Governance Strategic Team working directly for the then Executive Director Achim Steiner. The team led the secretariat for the Nairobi-Helsinki Ministerial Consultative Process International Environment Governance which made key recommendations on strengthening UNEP. In 2012 at Rio+20 Chambers continued to lead the team and engage governments resulting in an outcome in The Future We Want that was a major step forward for upgrading and strengthening UNEP. This included transforming UNEP's Governing Council into a universal body called the United Nations Environmental Assembly, increasing its regular budget, and strengthening UNEP's institutional base in the United Nations.

Chambers worked at the United Nations University where he started its programme on Sustainable Development Governance and on Environmental Diplomacy at its Institute of Advanced Studies (UNU/IAS). These were programmes that conducted training for Climate Change Negotiators and training trainers for the WTO Ministerial negotiations. The programmes also provided policy and expert advice on major United Nations Environmental Negotiations. He held several positions at the UN University from 1996 to 2008 including Senior Research Fellow, Legal Officer and Senior Programme Officer and acting Deputy of the UNU/IAS. Chambers also with A.H. Zakri launched at the UN University the first Post-doctoral programmes. Before joining the UNU Chambers worked at UNCTAD on investment rules and in the Transnational Corporation Division. Chambers has worked in numerous Scientific Assessments including as a Coordinating Lead Author in the Millennium Ecosystem Assessment which won the Zayed Environmental Prize in 2005 and Global Environmental Outlook 4. Chambers has been a senior lecturer at Aoyama Gakuin University, Chiba University, Sophia University and was a visiting professor at the University of Tokyo in the Law Faculty.

== Publications ==
He has published, written and edited several books on environmental governance including Interlinkages and the Effectiveness of Multilateral Environmental Agreements, Reforming International Environmental Governance: co-edited Jessica F. Green. Institutional Interplay: Biosafety and Trade Paperback – April 10, 2008, co-edited with Oran R. Young Inter-linkages: The Kyoto Protocol and the International Trade and Investment Regimes, Trade the Environment and the Millennium with Gary P. Sampson., Developing Countries and the WTO: Policy Approaches co-edited with Gary P. Sampson. He has lectured and has written extensively on many environmental issues including on international wildlife and biodiversity.

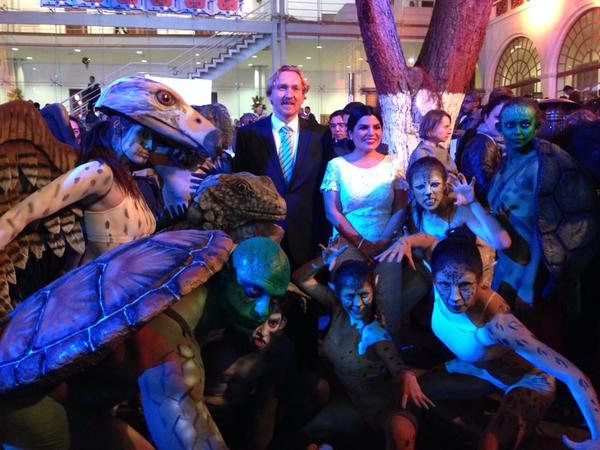
Bradnee Chambers and Lorena Tapia Minister of Environment of Ecuador at Government reception for COP11 CMS

== Education ==
He has degrees from University of Edinburgh (PHD), University of Reading (MA), University of Nottingham (LLM), and University of Windsor.
