= Gary P. Sampson =

Australian economist

Gary P. Sampson in 2017

Gary P. Sampson is professor of international trade at Melbourne Business School (MBS), Melbourne University, Australia.

In 1986, he was appointed director at the General Agreement on Tariffs and Trade in Geneva, and then in 1995, director at the World Trade Organization, where he has directed a number of divisions. In 2001 he was appointed senior counsellor in the Office of the director general at the WTO.

He is an Australian to have worked at both GATT and the WTO.

During his time at the WTO he taught in the Advanced Management Program of INSEAD as well as executive development programs and the MBA. He teaches on a regular basis in TRIUM, the combined executive MBA of Stern School of Business in New York City, London School of Economics, and HEC School of Management in Paris. He has taught in the MBA and EMBA programs at MBS since 1999.

He is trained as an economist, and, after completing a Doctor of Philosophy at Monash University, he was awarded a post-doctoral research grant by Cambridge University in England. He was subsequently appointed senior lecturer in economics at Monash University. In 1975 he moved to Geneva, where he worked with various divisions of the United Nations Conference on Trade and Development.

From 1984 to 1986, he was senior fellow in economic policy with the Reserve Bank of Australia, and professorial fellow at the Centre of Policy Studies at Monash University. He also held various advisory positions with the Australian Industries Commission and the Economic Policy Advisory Committee in the Office of the Prime Minister.

From 1999 to 2002 he was on leave from the WTO. During this time, he held the posts of professor of international economic governance at the United Nations University in Tokyo, and visiting academic at London School of economics.

In 2002 he returned to the WTO and until March 2005 he was senior counsellor in the office of the director general. During this period, he maintained his chair at the United Nations University, and continued to teach at both London School of Economics and Melbourne Business School.

In 2012 he was appointed to the United Nations High Level Advisory Committee for the World Congress on Justice, Governance and Law for Environmental Sustainability held in Rio de Janeiro.

In May 2017, Gary Sampson was awarded the Inaugural Distinguished Alumni Award by Monash Business School, Monash University, and in May 2021 he was appointed Distinguished Academic Fellow at the Melbourne Business School, Melbourne University.

He has written extensively on all areas of international economics and published widely in both academic and more popular press. His most recent books include "Trade, Environment and the Millennium", "The Role of the WTO in Global Governance", "Regional Integration and the Multilateral Trading System: Issues for the Future", and "The WTO and Sustainable Development". "Trade the Environment and the Millennium" and "Developing Countries and the WTO: Policy Approaches" were both edited with Bradnee Chambers.
