= Agreement on the Conservation of Gorillas and Their Habitats =

Multilateral environmental agreement

Gorilla Agreement
Agreement on the Conservation of Gorillas and Their Habitats Accord sur la conservation des gorilles et de leurs habitats
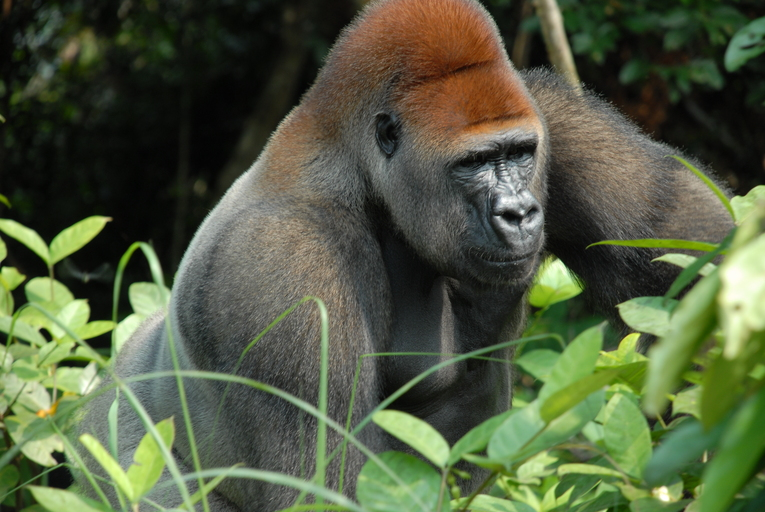
- Silverback gorilla
- Context: Nature conservation
- Signed: 26 October 2007
- Location: Bonn, Germany
- Effective: 1 June 2008
- Ratifiers: Central African Republic; Republic of the Congo; Nigeria; Democratic Republic of the Congo; Rwanda; Gabon
- Languages: English and French

The Agreement on the Conservation of Gorillas and Their Habitats, also known as the Gorilla Agreement (French: Accord Gorille), is a multilateral environmental agreement that binds the parties to conserve gorillas in their territories. It was concluded 2007 under the auspices of the Convention on Migratory Species of Wild Animals (CMS), also known as the "Bonn Convention", with scientific support from the Royal Belgian Institute for Natural Sciences and GRASP. The Gorilla Agreement covers 10 range states (Angola, Cameroon, Central African Republic, Congo Republic, Democratic Republic of the Congo, Equatorial Guinea, Gabon, Nigeria, Rwanda and Uganda) and entered into force in June 2008.

== Development of the Agreement ==
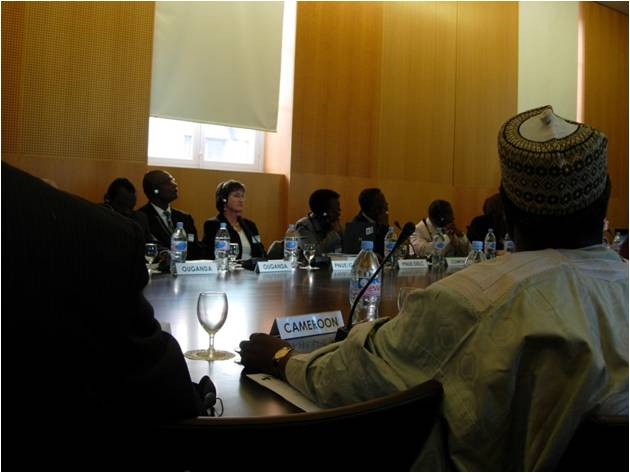
Negotiation of the Gorilla Agreement, Paris, 22–26 October 2007

To implement the decision of the conference of the parties of CMS to list the gorilla on Appendix I of the convention and taking into consideration the unfavourable conservation status and the conviction that the gorilla would significantly benefit from international cooperation that could be achieved by a multilateral agreement, an Article IV Agreement was concluded in 2007. The text of this legally binding agreement was negotiated on a meeting in Paris between 22 and 26 October 2007, under the auspices of CMS and attended by nine of the ten gorilla range states. The final act was signed on 24 October 2007 and entered into force on 1 June 2008, after ratification by three range states. As of August 2012, the Gorilla Agreement has six parties.

Signatures without reservation:

- Central African Republic (26 October 2007)
- Republic of the Congo (26 October 2007)
- Nigeria (5 March 2008)
- Democratic Republic of the Congo (25 April 2008)
- Rwanda (25 September 2008)
- Gabon (1 November 2008)

== Aim of the agreement ==
The overall aim of the Gorilla Agreement is to provide a framework for the conservation of gorillas and their habitats and to establish the legal structure necessary to make all the initiatives durable and to integrate conservation actions in collaboration with the ten range states. This should be reached by conserving and restoring the highly threatened gorilla populations in Central and West Africa through an action plan, covering education, research and forest protection.

== Species covered ==
All taxa of gorillas are covered by the Agreement:

- Western lowland gorilla (Gorilla gorilla gorilla)
- Cross River gorilla (Gorilla gorilla diehli)
- Eastern lowland gorilla (Gorilla beringei graueri)
- Mountain gorilla (Gorilla beringei beringei)

== Fundamental components ==
=== Preamble ===
In the preamble the parties refer to the listing of all taxa of gorillas on Appendix I of the CMS due to their unfavourable conservation status. They note the exceptional significance of great apes for the natural and cultural heritage of humankind and emphasize that gorillas could significantly benefit from international cooperation through a multilateral environmental agreement. To achieve effective implementation of such an agreement, the parties acknowledge assistance must be provided to some range states for research, training and monitoring of gorillas and their habitats and for the management of those habitats.

=== Articles ===
The agreement contains seventeen articles; however the most important is Article III, which contains the general conservation measures. The parties to the Gorilla Agreement shall:

1. Conserve gorillas and where feasible and appropriate, restore important habitats
2. Prohibit the taking of gorillas (without the exceptions made in the CMS)
3. Identify sites and habitats for the gorillas and ensure the protection, management and restoration of these sites
4. Coordinate their efforts to ensure that a network is maintained or re-established
5. Coordinate their activities to eradicate activities related to poaching
6. Reinforce and support capacity building measures of the judiciary and law enforcement agencies
7. Support initiatives to stop the spread of Ebola and to find a cure for Ebola
8. Cooperate in emergency situations
9. Take measures to prevent conflicts between humans and gorillas through appropriate land-use planning
10. Cooperate in the development of appropriate training programmes for gorilla surveys, monitoring and forest conservation management
11. Initiate or support research into the biology and ecology of gorillas
12. Develop and maintain programmes to raise public awareness

=== Annex I ===
The annex indicates the geographical scope of the Gorilla Agreement, namely all range states of all species and sub-species of gorillas. These are: Angola, Cameroon, Central African Republic, Congo Republic, Democratic Republic of the Congo, Equatorial Guinea, Gabon, Nigeria, Rwanda and Uganda.

== Bodies of the agreement ==
=== Meeting of the Parties ===
The Meeting of the Parties (MoP) is the highest decision-making body of the agreement and adopts resolutions. Ordinary sessions of the MoP take place at least every three years, unless the MoP decides otherwise. Where it is possible to do so, the sessions should be held in conjunction with the ordinary meetings of the conference of the parties to CMS. On the written request of at least one third of the parties, an extraordinary session shall be convened. Only parties have the right to vote and each party has only one vote. Decisions of the MoP are usually adopted by consensus, or if consensus cannot be achieved, by a two-thirds majority of the parties present and voting.

At each of its ordinary session, the MoP has the following responsibilities and duties:

- Consider actual and potential changes in the conservation status of gorillas and the habitats important for their survival, as well as the factors which may affect them
- Review the progress made and any difficulty encountered in the implementation of this agreement
- Adopt a budget and consider any matters relating to the financial arrangement for this agreement
- Deal with any matter relating to the agreement secretariat and the membership of the technical committee
- Adopt a report for communication to the parties to this agreement and to the conferences of the parties of the CMS
- Determine the time and venue of the next session

At any of its sessions, the MoP may also:

- Make recommendations to the parties as it deems necessary or appropriate
- Adopt specific actions to improve the effectiveness of this agreement and, as the case may be, emergency measures
- Consider and decide upon proposals to amend this agreement
- Amend the action plan
- Establish such subsidiary bodies as it deems necessary to assist in the implementation of this agreement, in particular for coordination with bodies established under other international treaties, conventions and agreements with overlapping geographic and taxonomic coverage
- Decide on any other matter relating to the implementation of this agreement
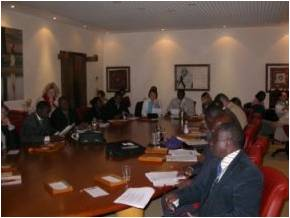
  First MoP to the Gorilla Agreement, Rome, 29 November 2008

The First MoP took place in Rome, Italy, on 29 November 2008. During the First MoP four action plans were adopted (one for each sub-species of gorilla); an annual contribution of €3000 was also agreed (however, up until today, only the contribution of Rwanda has been received). Finally, two resolutions were adopted, one on the monitoring and reporting and one on the establishment of the Technical Committee. The parties represented at the meeting were Congo, Democratic Republic of the Congo, Gabon, Nigeria and non-party range states Cameroon, Equatorial Guinea and Uganda.

The Second MoP was held in Bergen, Norway, 26–27 November 2011. During the Second MoP four resolutions were adopted on the following matters: cooperation and information sharing improved wildlife law enforcement; financial matters; institutional arrangements for the agreement and elements of information management for gorilla conservation. The parties represented were Congo, Gabon and Nigeria and non-party range states Cameroon, Equatorial Guinea and Uganda. All ten range states planned to attend the meeting, but representatives of Angola, Central African Republic, DRC and Rwanda were not able to obtain visas in time.

=== Technical Committee ===
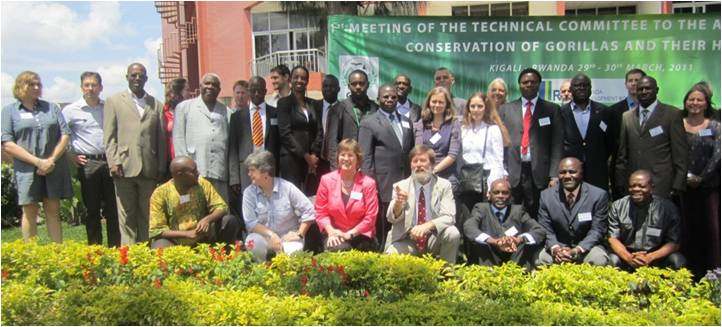
First Meeting of Technical Committee of the Gorilla Agreement, Kigali, Rwanda, 29–30 March 2011

The Technical Committee was established at the First MoP on 29 November 2008 and has the following members:

- One representative of each range state with professional capacity in wildlife conservation;
- One representative from UNEP/GRASP;
- One expert from each of the following fields: forest management and conservation (as of 2012 Dr. Conrad Aveling), environmental law (as of 2012 David Higgins from INTERPOL), wild animal health (as of 2012 Patricia Reed from WCS).

The Technical Committee would normally convene once between regular triennial MoP. The committee can work by correspondence between formal meetings. The main task of the Technical Committee is to provide scientific and technical advice and information to the MoP and the parties and make recommendations concerning the action plan, implementation of the agreement and further research to be carried out. In addition, in the event of an emergency affecting the conservation status of one or more gorilla taxa, the committee can call for steps to be taken to reduce this threat.

The First meeting of the Technical Committee took place in Kigali, Rwanda, 29–30 March 2011.

=== Secretariat ===
The secretariat is the executive body of the agreement. The CMS Secretariat is acting as the Interim Secretariat to the Gorilla Agreement, as agreed at the 32nd CMS Standing Committee in November 2007. Bradnee Chambers serves in his capacity as executive secretary of CMS as the acting executive secretary of the Gorilla Agreement since March 2013. The establishment of an independent secretariat, as mentioned in Article VII of the agreement, depends on financing. It was decided on the 2nd MoP in 2011 that the interim secretariat shall investigate the possibility of a party or an organization/institution - such as UNEP or GRASP - hosting the permanent secretariat.

The main tasks of the secretariat are the following:

- Arrange and service the MoP and meeting of the Technical Committee and other working groups
- Execute decisions adopted by the MoP
- Promote and coordinate activities under the Gorilla Agreement, including the action plan
- Liaise with non-party states and to facilitate coordination between the parties and with international and national organizations
- Propose and administer the budget
- Provide information for the general public

== Action plans ==
Article VIII of the Gorilla Agreement states that the parties shall adopt action plans for all species and sub-species of gorillas. These plans specify the actions that will be undertaken consistent with the general conservation measures specified in Article III. At each ordinary session of the MoP the action plans will be reviewed and can be amended. Four action plans (one for each of the sub-species) were adopted at the first MoP in 2008. They were drafted by the Royal Belgian Institute for Natural Sciences and were based on existing plans from the IUCN/SSC. The plans contain a list of most important sites; reveal the main threats and identify priority actions needed per country.

Such actions can include:

- Enforcement of existing legislation
- Protection of gorilla habitat by rebuilding and mitigating damage caused as a result of war and conflict and stopping illegal activities
- Improve monitoring and research
- Raise public awareness through e.g. making documentaries on the preservation of gorillas
- Community development, such as reducing local populations' poverty near the sanctuaries and reserves and encourage local communities to take part in reserve and sanctuary management
- Putting in place a long-term financing system, allowing to support national and local NGOs involved in the preservation of gorilla populations and their habitats

At the 2nd MoP in 2011 the parties had the duty to review the action plans. However, the IUCN and others have the intention to update the current plans for the four subspecies. Therefore, the parties decided, on the proposal of the interim secretariat, to take part in these processes and the updated action plans may be adopted by the next MoP.

== See also ==
- Great Apes Survival Project
- United Nations Environment Programme
