= Bakas =

Village in Uttar Pradesh, India

Bakas Bakkas
- Village
- Location in Uttar Pradesh, India Bakas (India)
- Coordinates: 26.78914°N 81.04875°E
- Country: India
- State: Uttar Pradesh
- District: Lucknow

Area
  - Total: 7.305 km^{2} (2.820 sq mi)
- Elevation: 120 m (390 ft)

Population (2011)
  - Total: 8,171
  - Density: 1,119/km^{2} (2,897/sq mi)

Languages
  - Official: Hindi
- Time zone: UTC+5:30 (IST)

Bakas, also spelled Bakkas, is a village in Gosainganj block of Lucknow district, Uttar Pradesh, India. As of 2011, its population is 8,171, in 1,444 households. It is the seat of a gram panchayat.

== History ==
Around the turn of the 20th century, Bakas was described as "a considerable village" in the northern part of the pargana of Mohanlalganj, with a population of 2,200. The lands belonging to the village stretched northward to the bank of the Gomti River; they were extensively cultivated, with loamy soil and irrigation provided from tanks and wells. Bakas hosted a weekly market, and it was held in zamindari tenure by the Janwars of Mau.
