= Bwindi =

Bwindi may refer to:

- Bwindi Impenetrable Forest, a primeval forest located in southwestern Uganda
- Bwindi Impenetrable National Park, a park containing much of Bwindi Impenetrable Forest
- Bwindi gorilla, a population of mountain gorillas found in Bwindi Impenetrable Forest
- The 1999 Bwindi massacre of eight Western tourists to Bwindi Impenetrable National Park by the Army for the Liberation of Rwanda
