= Thomas S. Savage =

American Protestant clergyman, missionary, physician, and naturalist

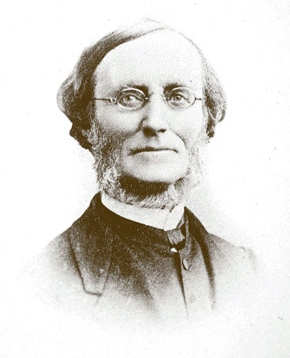

Thomas Staughton Savage (June 7, 1804 in Cromwell, Connecticut – December 27, 1880 in Rhinebeck, New York) was an American Protestant clergyman, missionary, physician, and naturalist.

Savage was born in Middletown, Connecticut to ship owner Josiah Savage and Mary Roberts. The family consisted of wealthy Congregationalists and he went to Yale College and Yale Medical School, receiving an MD in 1833. He then travelled across the US and then joined the Virginia Theological Seminary and graduated in 1836. His first marriage was to Susan A. Metcalfe September 28, 1838. He married his second wife, Maria Chapin, in 1842. It was after her death that he married Elizabeth Rutherford, granddaughter of the author Eliza Fenwick, in 1844. He was the father of five children, Elizabeth Fenwick Savage (b. 1846), Alexander Duncan Savage (1848–1935), Thomas Rutherford Savage (1851–1918), William Rutherford Savage (1854–1934), Jesse Duncan Savage (b. 1858). He was the grandfather of the American artist Thomas Casilear Cole (1888–1976).

Savage was ordained deacon in July 1836 and priest in October the same year. He was then sent as a medical missionary to Liberia. During his time in Africa he acquired the skull and bones from an unknown ape species, which he described in 1847 at the Boston Society of Natural History with American naturalist and anatomist Jeffries Wyman with the scientific name Troglodytes gorilla, now known as the western gorilla.
