= Virunga =

Virunga may refer to:

- Virunga Mountains, a chain of volcanoes in East Africa
- Virunga National Park, in the eastern Democratic Republic of Congo
  - Virunga Foundation, nature conservation body, mainly in the Virunga National Park
- DC Virunga, a Congolese football club based in Goma
- Stade de Virunga, a multi-use stadium in Goma
- Virunga (film), a 2014 documentary
- Virunga: The Passion of Dian Fossey, Canadian title of the 1987 book Woman in the Mists by Farley Mowat
