= Ecological extinction =

Ecology term

Ecological extinction is "the reduction of a species to such low abundance that, although it is still present in the community, it no longer interacts significantly with other species".

Ecological extinction stands out because it is the interaction ecology of a species that is important for conservation work. They state that "unless the species interacts significantly with other species in the community (e.g. it is an important predator, competitor, symbiont, mutualist, or prey) its loss may result in little to no adjustment to the abundance and population structure of other species".

This view stems from the neutral model of communities that assumes there is little to no interaction within species unless otherwise proven.

Estes, Duggins, and Rathburn (1989) recognize two other distinct types of extinction:

- Global extinction is defined as "the ubiquitous disappearance of a species".
- Local extinction is characterized by "the disappearance of a species from part of its natural range".

== Keystone species ==
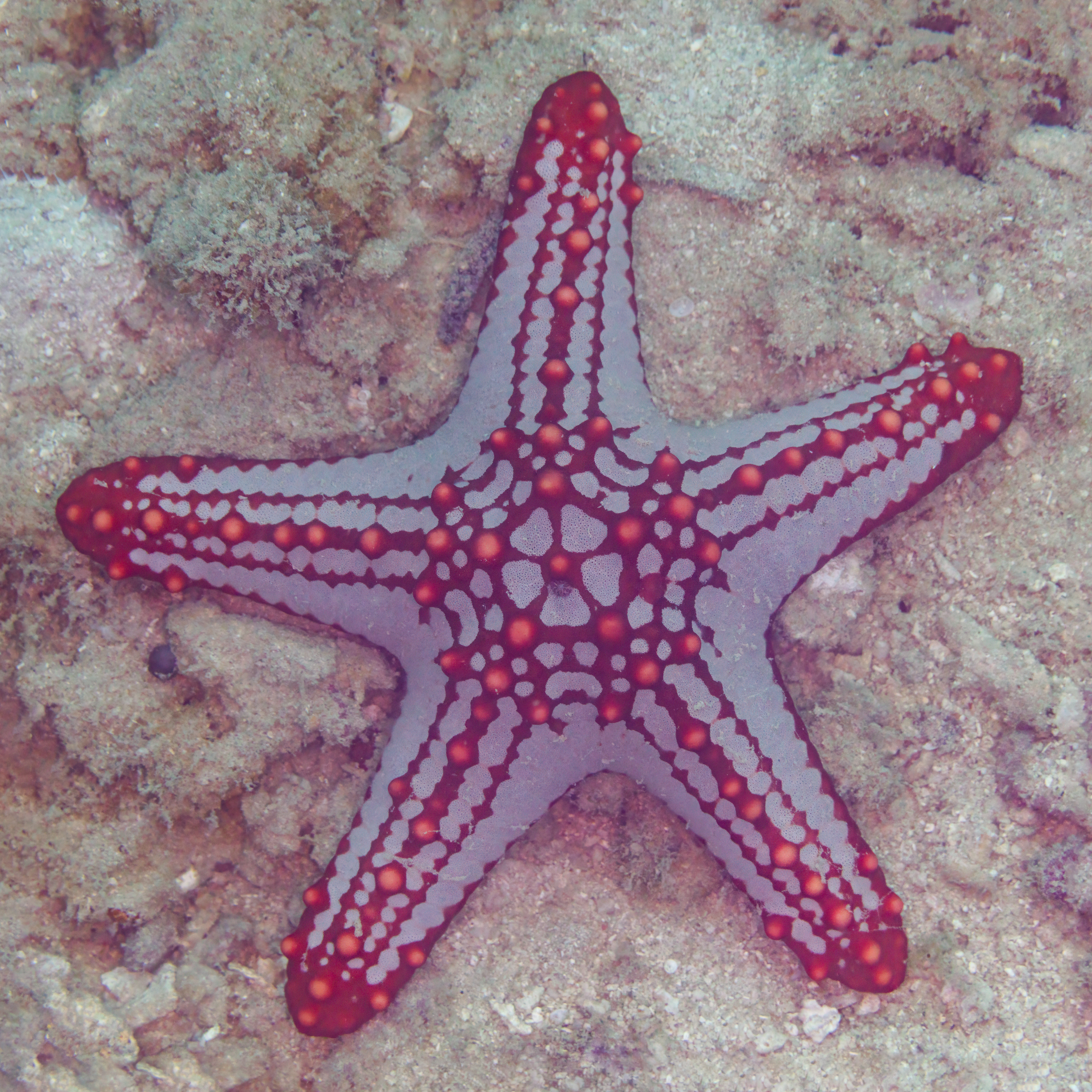
Paine first established the concept of a keystone species by studying the sea star.

Robert Paine (1969) first came up with the concept of a keystone species while studying the effects of the predatory sea star Pisaster ochraceus, on the abundance of the herbivorous gastropod, Tegula funebralis. This study took place in the rocky intertidal habitat off the coast of Washington; Paine removed all Pisaster in 8m x 10m plots weekly while noting the response of Tegula for two years. He found that removing the top predator, in this case being Pisaster, reduced species number in the treatment plots.

Paine defined the concept of a keystone species as a species that has a disproportionate effect on the community structure of an environment in relation to its total biomass. This keystone species effect forms the basis for the concept of ecological extinction.

== Examples ==
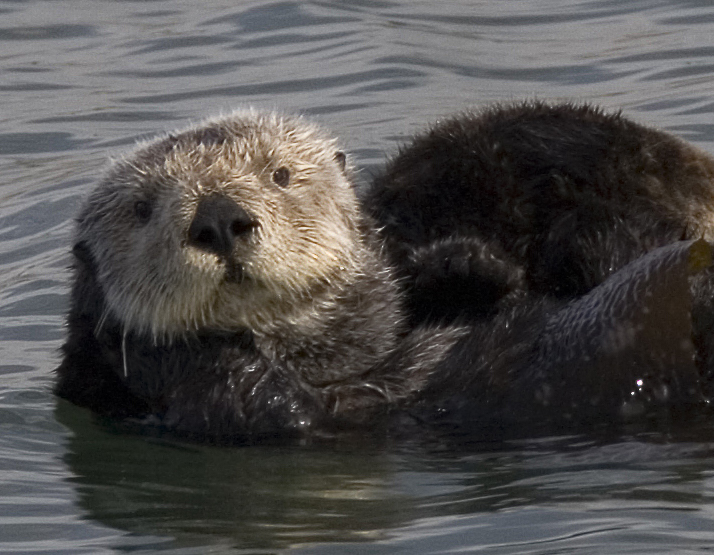
Sea otters maintain the overall biodiversity of the kelp forest community.

The potential role of the sea otter as the keystone predator in near-shore kelp forests was evaluated by Estes et al. in a 1978 study. They compared the Rat and Near islands in the Aleutian islands to test if "sea otter predation controls epibenthic invertebrate populations (specifically sea urchins), and in turn releases the vegetation association from intense grazing". Estes and his colleagues found that different size structures and densities of sea urchins were correlated with the presence of sea otter populations, and because they are the principal prey of this keystone predator, the sea otters were most likely the main determinants of the differences in sea urchin populations.

With high sea otter densities the herbivory of sea urchins in these kelp forest was severely limited, and this made competition between algal species the main determinant in survival. However, when sea otters were absent, herbivory of the sea urchins was greatly intensified to the point of decimation of the kelp forest community. This loss of heterogeneity serves as a loss of habitat for both fish and eagle populations that depend on the richly productive kelp forest environment. Historical over harvesting of sea otter furs has severely restricted their once wide-ranging habitat, and only today are scientists starting to see the implications of these local extinctions.

The California spiny lobster, or Panulirus interruptus, is a keystone predator that has a distinct role in maintaining species diversity in its habitat. Robles (1987) demonstrated experimentally that the exclusion of spiny lobsters from the intertidal zone habitats led to the competitive dominance of mussels (Mytilus edulis and M. californianus). This results shows another example of how the ecological extinction of a keystone predator can reduce species diversity in an ecosystem. The threshold of ecological extinction has passed due to over fishing so that local extinctions of the California spiny lobster are common.

Commercial oyster fishing had not affected the Chesapeake Bay ecosystem until mechanical dredges were utilized in the 1870s, resulting in overfishing of the oysters. The bay today is plagued by eutrophication due to algal blooms, and the resulting water is highly hypoxic. These algal blooms have competitively excluded any other species from surviving, including the rich diversity in faunal life that once flourished such as dolphins, manatees, river otters, sea turtles, alligators, sharks, and rays. This highlights the top-down loss of diversity commercial fishing has on marine ecosystems by removing the keystone species of the environment.

== Invasive species ==
The potential ecological extinction of guanacos (Lama guanicoe) and lesser rheas (Pterocnemia pennata) as a prey source for native omnivores and predators in the Argentine Patagonia was assessed by a study by Novaro in 2000. These native species are being replaced by introduced species such as the European rabbit, red deer, and domestic cattle; the cumulative damage from the increased herbivory by introduced species has also served to accelerate destruction of the already dwindling Argentine pampas and steppe habitats. This was the first study to take into account a large number of diverse predators, ranging from skunks to pumas, as well as conduct their survey in non-protected areas that represent the majority of southern South America. Novaro and his colleagues found that the entire assemblage of native carnivores relied primarily on introduced species as a prey base. They also suggested that the lesser rhea and guanaco had already passed their ecological effective density as a prey species, and thus were ecologically extinct. It is possible that the niches of introduced species as herbivores too closely mirrored those of the natives, and thus competition was the primary cause of ecological extinction. The effect of introduction of new competitors, such as the red deer and rabbit, also served to alter the vegetation in the habitat, which could have further pronounced the intensity of competition. Guanacos and rheas have been classified as a low risk for global extinction, but this simplistic view of their demography does not take into account that they have already become functionally extinct in the Argentine Patagonia. Novaro and his colleagues suggest "this loss could have strong effects on plant-animal interactions, nutrient dynamics, and disturbance regimes ..." This is an example of how current conservation policy has failed to protect the intended species because of its lack of a functionally sound definition for extinction.

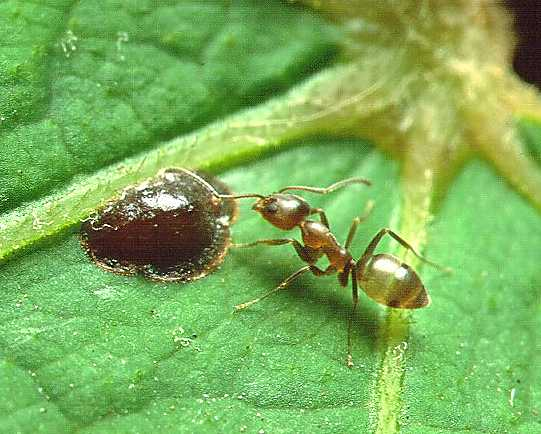
Christian found Argentine ants to disrupt large seed dispersal mutualisms.

Seed dispersal mechanisms play a fundamental role in the regeneration and continuation of community structure, and a recent study by Christian (2001) demonstrated a shift in the composition of the plant community in the South African shrublands following an invasion by the Argentine ant (Linepithema humile). Ants disperse up to 30% of the flora in the shrublands and are vital to the survival of fynbos plants because they bury the large seeds away from the dangers of predation and fire damage. It is also crucial for seeds to be buried, because nearly all seed germination takes place in the first season after a fire. Argentine ants, a recent invader, do not disperse even small seeds. Christian tested whether the invasion of the Argentine ant differentially effected small and large-seeded fauna. He found that post-fire recruitment of large-seeded flora was reduced disproportionately for large seeds in sites already invaded by Argentine ants. These initial low large-seed density recruitments will eventually lead the domination of small-seeded fauna in invaded habitats. The consequences of this change in community structure highlight the struggle for dispersal of large-seeded flora that have potential reverberations around the world because ants are major ecological seed dispersers throughout the globe.

== Modeling ecological extinction ==
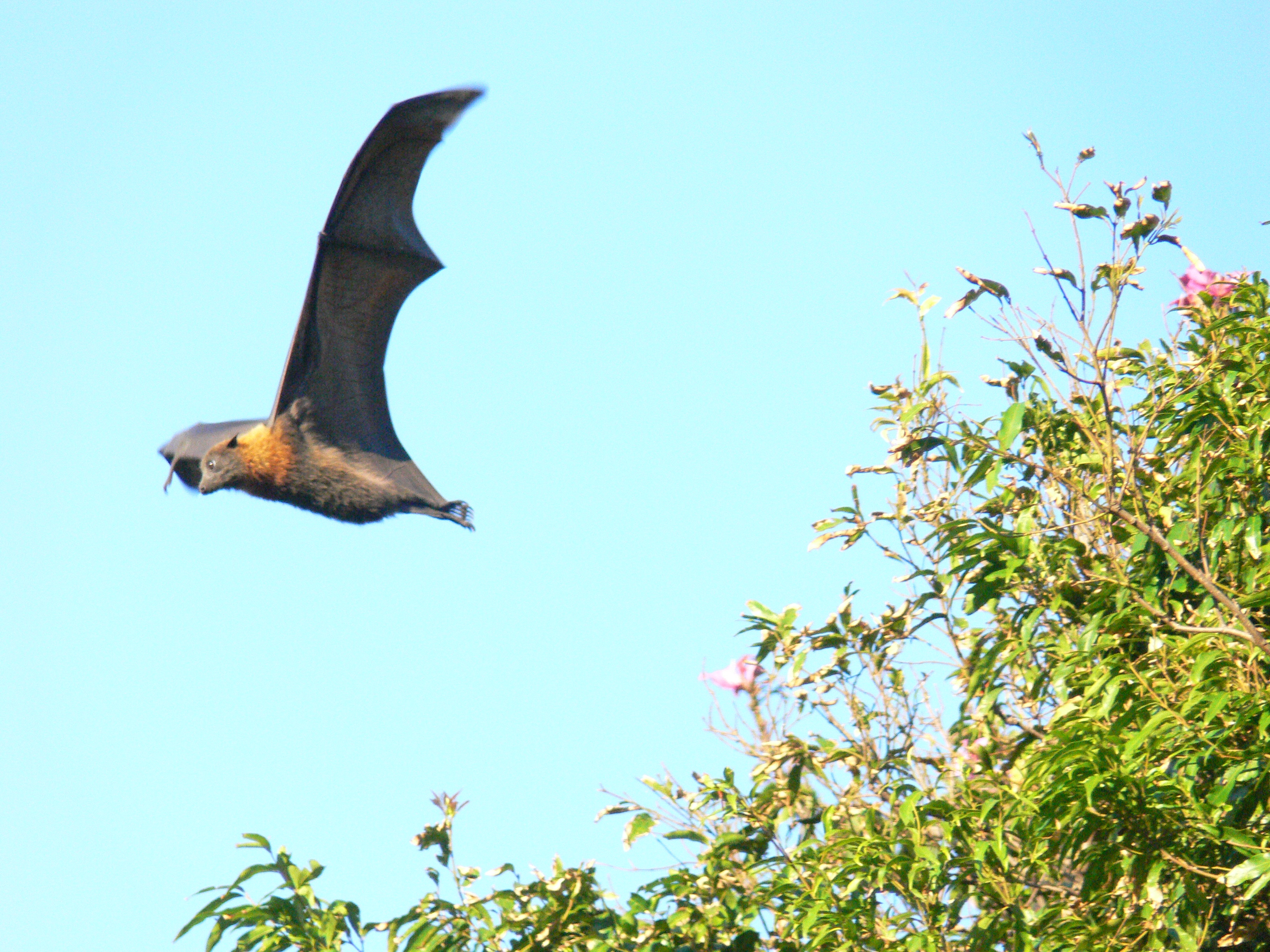
Below a certain density threshold, flying foxes are no longer effective seed dispersers.

The McConkey and Drake (2006) study is unique because it was one of the first attempts to model a density-dependent threshold relationship that described ecological extinction. They studied a seed dispersal interaction between flying foxes and trees with large seeds on the tropical Pacific Islands. Insular flying foxes (Pteropus tonganus), are considered to be keystone species because they are the only seed dispersers that can carry large seeds long distances. The host-pathogen model by Janzen and Connell suggests that survivorship of seeds in the tropics greatly increases the further away from the parent tree it lands, and that trees require this dispersal in order to avoid extinction. In the pathogen latent environment of the tropics, seed dispersal only becomes more paramount to species survival. As hypothesized, McConkey and Drake found a threshold relationship between the Flying Fox Index (FFI) and the median proportion of seeds carried over five meters. Below the threshold of abundance seed dispersal was insignificant and independent of flying fox abundance; however, above the threshold, dispersal positively correlated with increased flying fox abundance (as measured by the FFI). Although they did not directly prove the cause for this relationship, McConkey and Drake proposed a behavioral mechanism. Flying foxes are known to be territorial, and in the absence of competition a flying fox will eat within one tree, effectively dropping the seeds right below it. Alternatively, if there is a high density of flying foxes feeding at one time (abundance above the threshold density) then aggressive behavior, such as stealing fruit from another individual's territory, will lead to longer average seed dispersal. In this way the seed dispersing flying fox has a disproportional effect on the overall community structure in comparison to their relative biomass. Modeling the effect of ecological extinction on communities is the first step to applying this framework into conservation work.

Ecologists continue to study the interactions among species and the population densities at which ecological communities remain stable. Understanding how individual species interact with their environments can help inform conservation priorities and management strategies. This may be particularly important on islands, where ecosystems can contain relatively few species capable of occupying similar ecological niches. As species diversity and available habitat decline in many regions, identifying species and ecological processes that have disproportionate effects on ecosystem function may be important for conservation planning.

== Climate change ==
Climate change has produced numerous shifts in the distributions and abundances of species. Thomas et al. (2004) went on to assess the extinction risk due to these shifts over a broad range of global habitats. Their predictive model using midline estimates for climate warming over the next 50 years suggests that 15–37% of species will be "committed to extinction" by 2050. Although the average global temperature has risen .6°C, individual populations and habitats will only respond to their local changes in climate. Root et al. (2002) suggests that local changes in climate may account for density changes in regions, shifts in phenology (timing) of events, changes in morphology (biology) (such as body size), and shifts in genetic frequencies. They found that there have been an average phenological shift of 5.1 days earlier in the spring for a broad range of over a thousand compiled studies. This shift was also, as predicted, more pronounced in the upper latitudes that have concurrently had the largest shift in local average temperatures.

While the loss of habitat, loss of pollinator mutualisms, and the effect of introduced species all have distinct pressures on native populations, these effects must be looked underneath a synergistic and not an independent framework. Climate change has the potential to exacerbate all of these processes. Nehring (1999) found a total of 16 non-indigenous thermophilic phytoplankton established in habitats northwards of their normal range in the North Sea. He likened these changes in range of more southerly phytoplankton to climatic shifts in ocean temperature. All of these effects have additive effects to the stress on populations within an environment, and with the additionally fragile and more complete definition of ecological extinction must be taken into account into preventative conservation measures.

== Implications for conservation policy ==
Conservation policy has historically lagged behind current science all over the world, but at this critical juncture politicians must make the effort to catch up before massive extinctions occur on our planet. For example, the pinnacle of American conservation policy, the Endangered Species Act of 1973, fails to acknowledge any benefit for protecting highly interactive species that may help maintain overall species diversity. Policy must first assess whether the species in question is considered highly interactive by asking the questions "does the absence or loss of this species, either directly or indirectly, incur a loss of overall diversity, effect the reproduction or recruitment of other species, lead to a change in habitat structure, lead to a change in productivity or nutrient dynamics between ecosystems, change important ecological processes, or reduce the resilience of the ecosystem to disturbances?".

After these multitudes of questions are addressed to define an interactive species, an ecologically effective density threshold must be estimated in order to maintain this interaction ecology. This process holds many of the same variables contained within viable population estimates, and thus should not be difficult to incorporate into policy. To avoid mass extinction on a global scale unlike anyone has seen before, scientists must understand all of the mechanisms driving the process. It is now that the governments of the world must act in order to prevent this catastrophe of the loss of biodiversity from progressing further and wasting all of the time and money spent on previous conservation efforts.

== See also ==
- Argentine ant
- California spiny lobster
- Climate change
- Ecological threshold
- Extinction
- Flying fox
- Guanaco
- Keystone species
- Rhea
- Sea otter
