= Gulf of Oman desert and semi-desert =

Ecoregion in the Arabian Peninsula

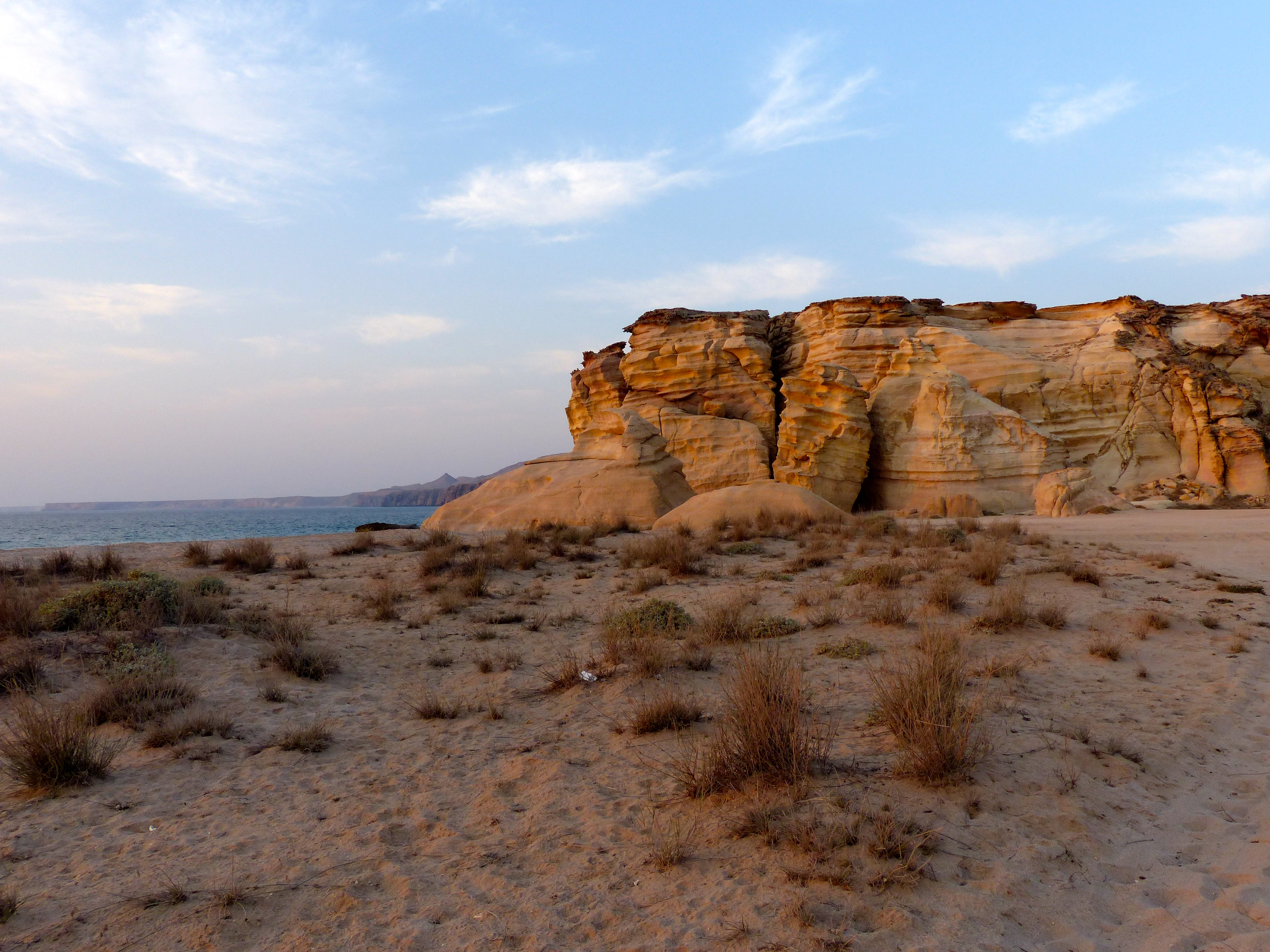
- Ras al-Jinz, Oman

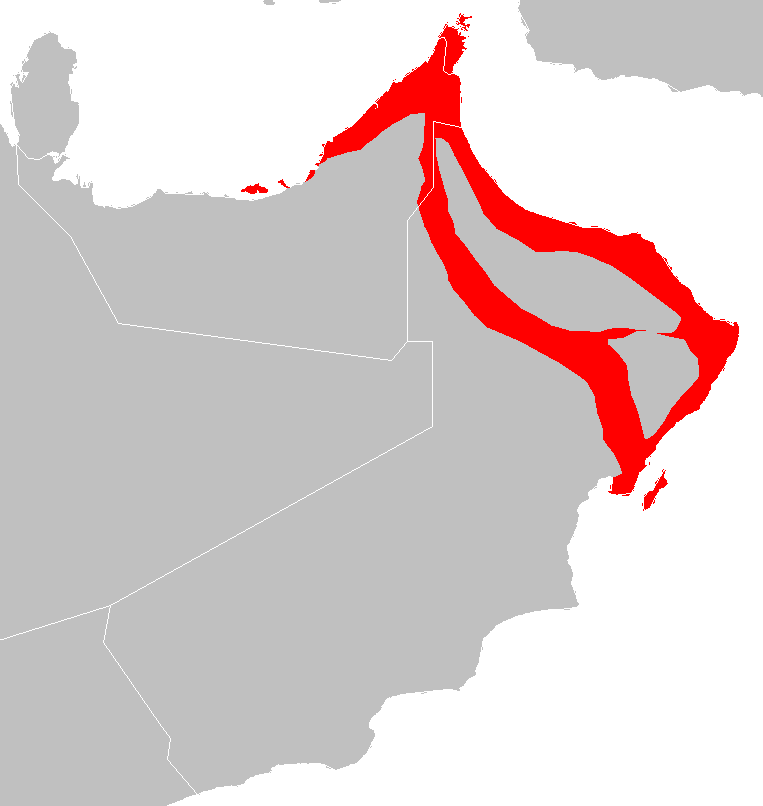
- Map of the ecoregion

Ecology
- Realm: Afrotropical
- Biome: deserts and xeric shrublands
- Borders: Al Hajar montane woodlands; Arabian Desert; Arabian Peninsula coastal fog desert; Indus River Delta–Arabian Sea mangroves

Geography
- Area: 62,420 km^{2} (24,100 mi^{2})
- Countries: Oman; United Arab Emirates

Conservation
- Conservation status: Critical/endangered
- Protected: 1.58%

The Gulf of Oman desert and semi-desert is a coastal ecoregion on the Persian Gulf and the Gulf of Oman in Oman and the United Arab Emirates at the northeastern tip of the Arabian Peninsula. The climate is hot and dry, with gravelly plains and savanna with thorny acacia trees inland from the coast. Along the coast there are mixture of habitats that include mangrove swamps, lagoons and mudflats. The mangrove areas are dominated by Avicennia marina and the savanna by Prosopis cineraria and Vachellia tortilis. Masirah Island is an important breeding area for the loggerhead sea turtle and other sea turtles also occur here, as well as a great variety of birds, some resident and some migratory. There are some protected areas, but in general the habitats have been degraded by the grazing of livestock, especially camels and goats; they are also at risk from oil spills, off-road driving and poaching.

== Location and description ==
In Oman this ecoregion includes the Musandam Peninsula, the enclave of Oman within the UAE on the Strait of Hormuz, the entrance to the Persian Gulf. In the main part of Oman it includes the coastal plain of the Al Batinah Region on the Gulf of Oman continuing along past Muscat to the beaches and dunes of the Ash Sharqiyah Region. From the Ras al Hadd point it runs south along the coast to the desert island of Masirah. It also includes an inland strip running along to the southwest of the Al Hajar Mountains. In the UAE it covers the plains around the Al Hajar mountains in the east, in the emirates of Dubai, Sharjah and Ras Al-Khaimah, and the country's Al Batinah coast around Fujairah.

This dry ecoregion contains a mixture of habitats including mangrove swamps, lagoons and mudflats on the coast, gravelly plains and savanna with thorny acacia trees inland with a background of the Musandam and Al Hajar mountains. The climate is hot and dry with temperatures up to 49 degrees Celsius (120 °F) and little rainfall, especially on the Persian Gulf coast of the UAE. There is more rainfall on the Gulf of Oman and humidity provides moisture on both coasts.

== Flora ==
The coastal mangrove consists of Avicennia marina, trees of the inland savanna include Ziziphus spina-christi (Christ's Thorn Jujube), Prosopis cineraria (Ghaf) and Vachellia tortilis (Umbrella Thorn), while the mountains are home to Ficus salicifolia (Wonderboom) and Vachellia tortilis. Finally, the traditional flora of the Al Batinah coast is Vachellia tortilis and Prosopis cineraria. Some of these species are found across the Persian Gulf in Iran.

== Fauna ==
The world's largest population of loggerhead sea turtle (Caretta caretta) breeds on Masirah Island and other turtles that come to these coasts include the olive ridley (Lepydochelys olivacea), green turtle (Chelonia mydas) and the endangered hawksbill turtle (Eretmochelys imbricata). The area is extremely rich in birdlife including a large migration between Asia and Africa. Endemic birds include a subspecies of collared kingfisher. Mammals include the endangered Arabian leopard (Panthera pardus nimr) in the mountains and Arabian tahr, as well as caracals but all these are vulnerable to hunting.

== Threats and preservation ==
Habitats have been degraded by the grazing of livestock, especially camels and goats. The Al Batinah coastal strip of Oman is the country's most densely populated area and is intensively farmed, partly by Oman's large community of Baloch people of Pakistani origin. Urban areas in this ecoregion in Oman include the country's capital and largest city, the historical port of Muscat, and the fishing towns of Barka, famous for its bull-butting, and Sohar, legendarily the home of Sindbad the Sailor, and the resort of Al Sawadi. Other tourist attractions along this coast include the historic castles of Nakhal Fort and Rustaq, the Sharqiya Sands and the turtle beaches at Ras Al Hadd and Ras al-Jinz. Cities of the UAE in this ecoregion include the huge commercial centre of Dubai and the nearby city of Sharjah. A popular excursion from Dubai is to the Hajar Mountains enclave of Hatta.

Other threats to the ecoregion include oil spills in the sea, poaching of wildlife and off-road driving to locations such as Wadi Bani Awf. Protected areas include Ras Al Khor in Dubai, famous for its wintering flamingos, and an area of mangroves at Khor Kalba Nature Reserve on the Gulf of Oman in the UAE near the border with Oman.
