= List of protected areas of the United Arab Emirates =

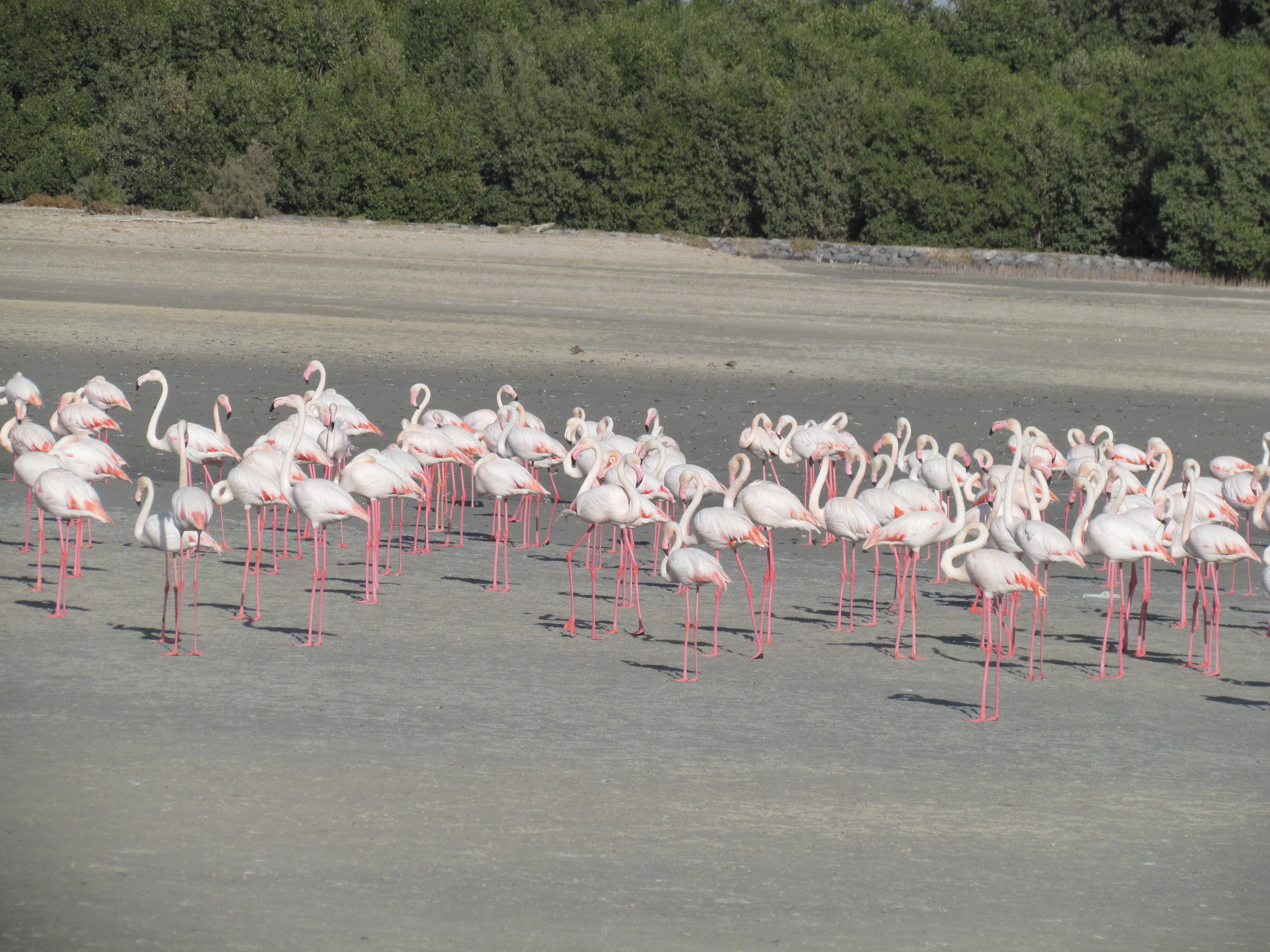
Flamingos at the Ras Al Khor Wildlife Sanctuary

This is a list of protected areas of United Arab Emirates:

- Abu Dhabi Mangrove and Coastal Wetland Reserve
- Ain al Faydah National Park
- Al Awir Nature Reserve
- Al Khawanij Nature Reserve
- Al Maha Nature Reserve
- Al Marmoom Desert Conservation Reserve
- Al Wohoosh Desert Conservation Reserve
- Dubai Desert Conservation Reserve National Park
- Hatta Nature Reserve
- Jabal Ali Wildlife Sanctuary
- Khor Kalba Nature Reserve
- Marawah Marine Protected Area
- Mushrif National Park
- Nadd Al Sheba Nature Reserve
- Rams Lagoon Reserve
- Ras Al Khor Wildlife Sanctuary
- Wadi Wurayah National Park
- Zirkuh Island Bird Sanctuary
