= Al Wohoosh Desert Conservation Reserve =

Nature reserve in Dubai, United Arab Emirates

- محمية الوحوش الصحراوية
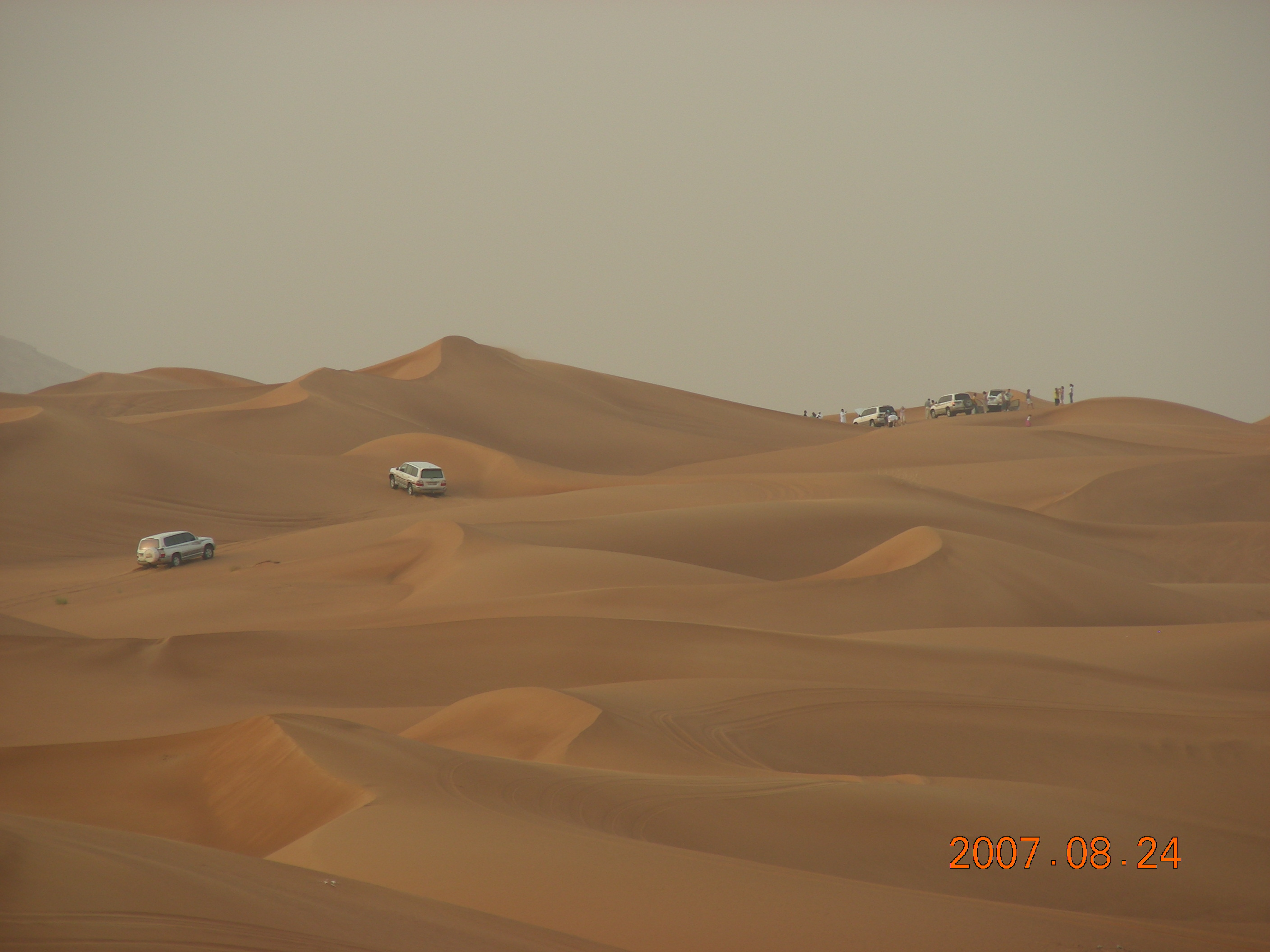
- Safari in Al Wohoosh

- Location within United Arab Emirates
- Location: Emirate of Dubai
- Nearest city: Dubai
- Coordinates: 25.11857°N 55.623272°E
- Area: 15.06 km^{2} (5.81 sq mi)
- Established: 2014

The Al Wohoosh Desert Conservation Reserve (Arabic: محمية الوحوش الصحراوية), is a natural protected area of the United Arab Emirates, established in 2014, which is located in the eastern area of the Emirate of Dubai.

== History of the area ==
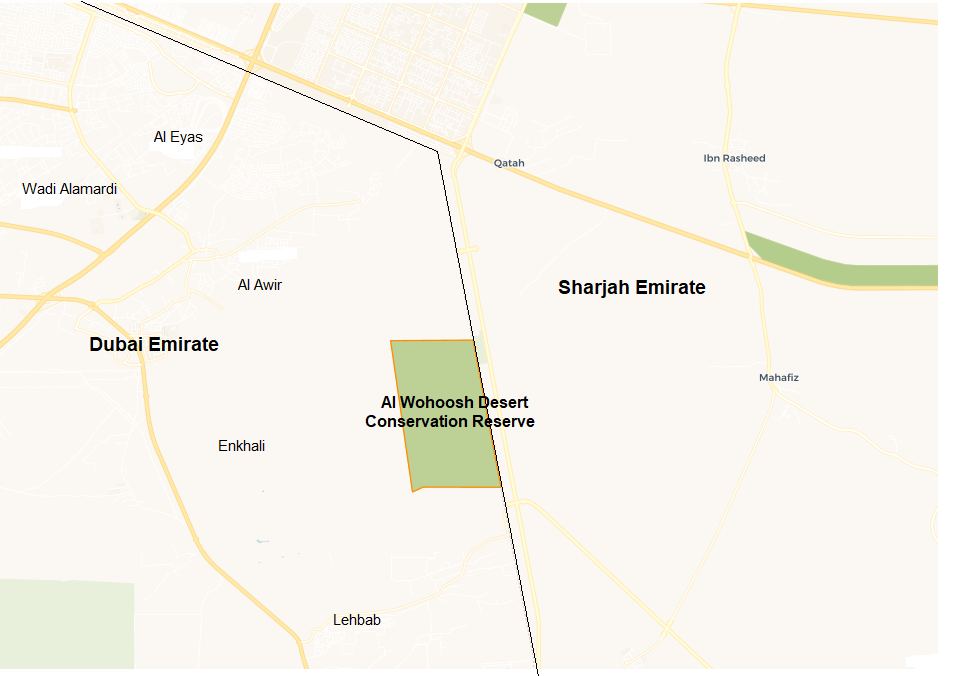
Al Wohoosh Reserve Map

Al Wohoosh Desert was declared a nature reserve by royal decree number 22 of 2014 issued by Sheikh Mohammed bin Rashid Al Maktoum, ruler of Dubai.

According to the law n. 11 of 2003 on the establishment of protected areas in the Emirate of Dubai the area is placed under the protection and governance of the Municipality of Dubai.

The Arabic name of the reserve translates to "sanctuary of monsters of the desert", because in the past the area was known for its predatory animals.

== Territory ==
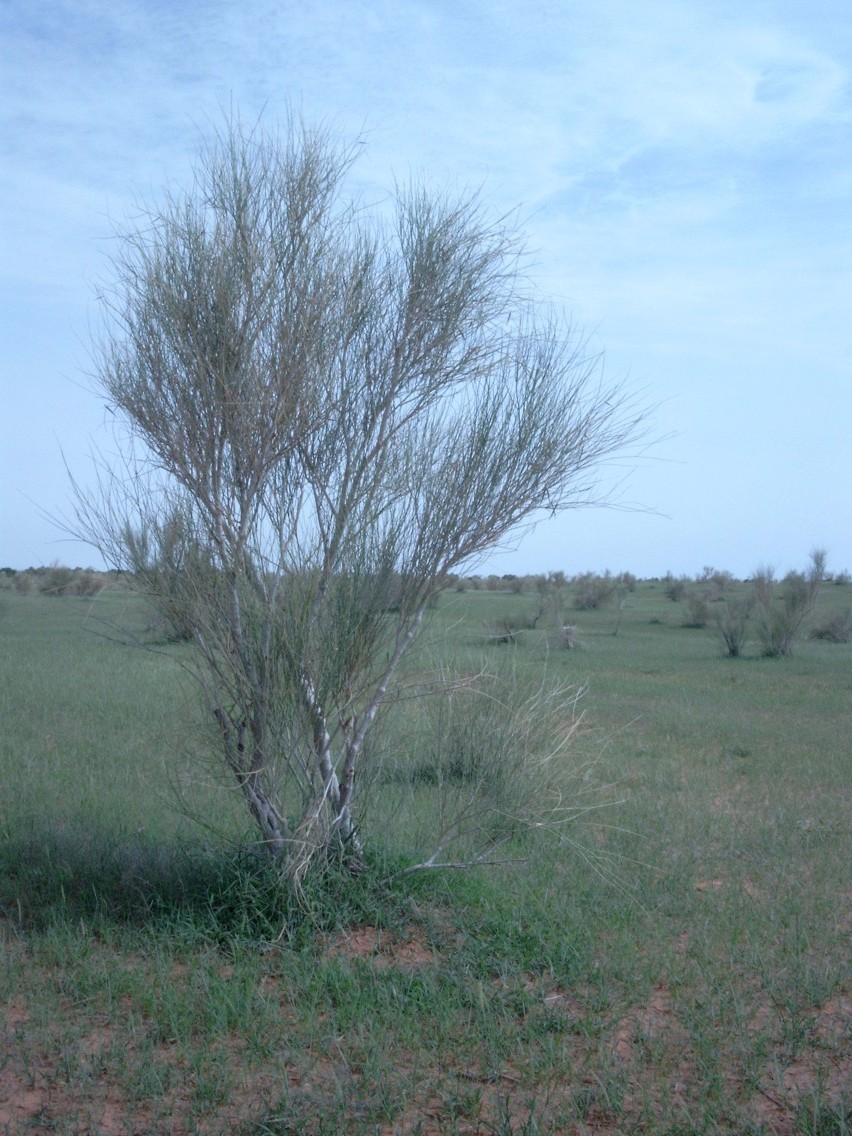
Leptadenia pyrotechnica

The reserve is located in eastern Dubai, occupying an area of 15.06 km^{2} along the border with the Al Bataeh municipality of the Emirate of Sharjah.

This desert area falls within the terrestrial ecoregion of the Gulf of Oman desert and semi-desert.

The main habitats of the area are: expanses of sand and dunes with forest of Prosopis cineraria, expanses of sand and dunes with Leptadenia pyrotechnica and inter-dune plains.

The minimum temperature varies between 10 and 45 °C in January and December and 26-29 °C in June–August. The maximum temperatures in the same periods are around 27 °C and 42 °C respectively. The rainiest months are February and March, while the driest are between June and October, with an average of 32–40 mm and 2–7 mm respectively per month.

The reserve is fenced but there are no controlled access points. In the northern part of the reserve there are some camps for tourists managed by authorized tour operators.

== Biodiversity ==
Due to the presence of different types of habitats the reserve is home to around 50 plant species and over 90 animal species.

The mammal community is home to various species including gazelles, desert foxes, hedgehogs and wild hares. Among the threatened species there are:

- Arabian gazelle (Gazella arabica);
- mountain gazelle (Gazella gazella cora).

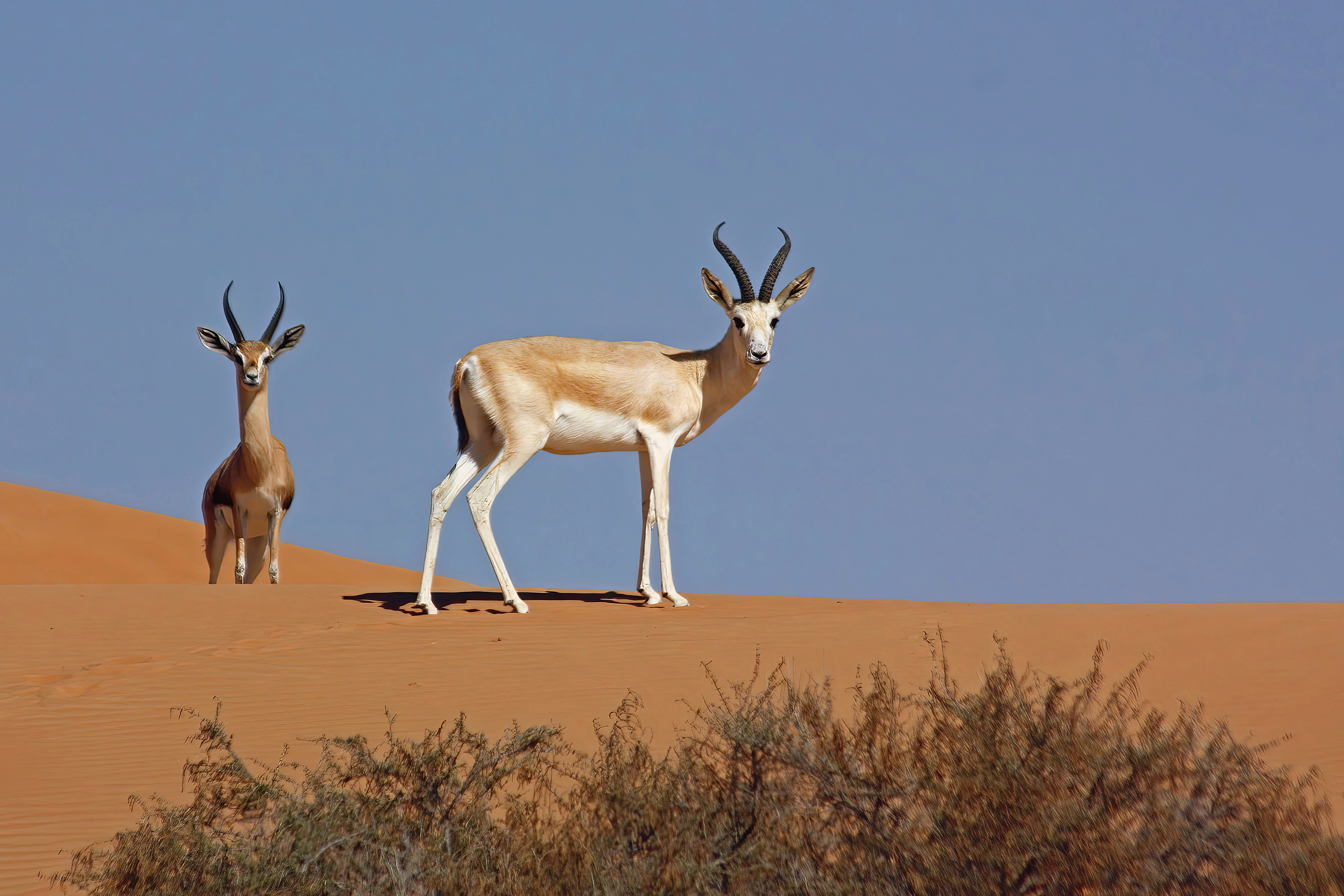
Arabian gazelle (Gazella arabica) mountain (Gazella gazella cora)

Among the birds are both resident and migratory species which include:

- Great grey shrike (Lanius excubitor);
- desert crow (Corvus ruficollis);
- steppe eagle (Aquila nipalensis);
- Asian desert warbler (Curruca nana).

Threatened bird species include:

- gregarious lapwing (Vanellus gregarius);
- sacred falcon (Falco cherrug);
- greater spotted eagle (Clanga clanga).

As regards the class of reptiles in the interdunal plains in the northern half of the reserve can be found the Leptien's mastigure (Uromastyx aegyptia leptieni). Other reptiles reported include: desert monitor lizard (Varanus griseus), worm lizard (Diplometopon zarudnyi), Arabian desert gecko (Bunopus tuberculatus), the Arabian toad-headed agama (Phrynocephalus arabicus), and the Arabian sandfish (Scincus mitranus).

The reserve is home to a variety of native plants, including a remarkable assortment of tree species such as Prosopis cineraria, Acacia tortilis (umbrella acacia), Ziziphus spina-christi, Salvadora persica, Calotropis procera (apple of Sodom) and Heliotropium kotschyi.

== Bibliography ==
- Joseph, Sabrina (2019). "Ecosystems as Commodity FrontiersChallenges Faced by Land Set Aside as Protected Areas PAs in the Dubai Emirate United Arab Emirates UAE". Commodity Frontiers and Global Capitalist Expansion: Social, Ecological and Political Implications from the Nineteenth Century to the Present Day. Springer. pp. 111–136. ISBN 978-3-030-15322-9.
