= Kalba Fort =

Castle in the United Arab Emirates

- Near Kalba in Sharjah, United Arab Emirates
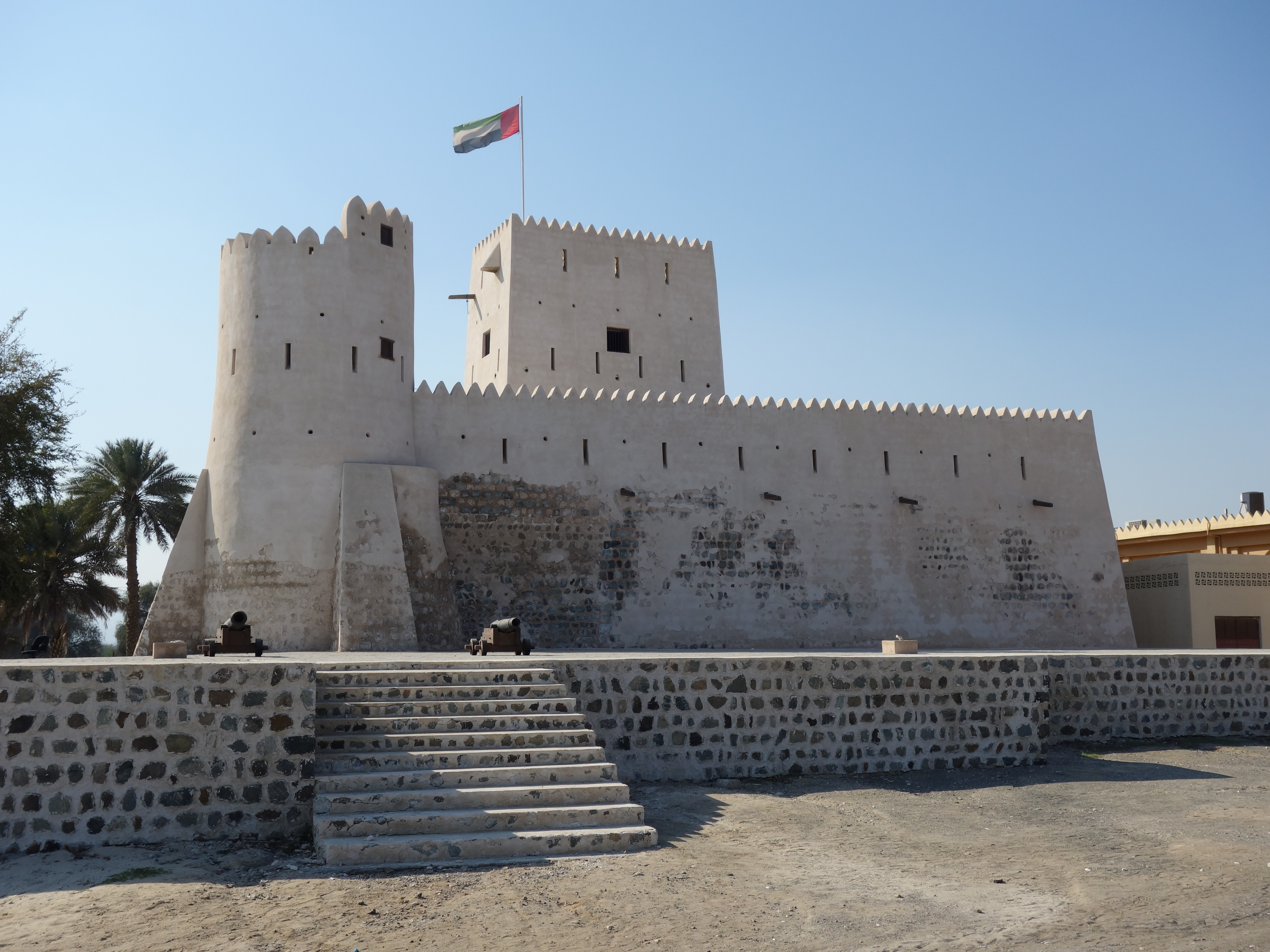

Site information
- Condition: Museum (as of 2021)

Location
- Coordinates: 25°08′05″N 56°21′19″E

Site history
- Built: 1745–1820
- Materials: Rock, mudbrick

Kalba Fort is an 18th century fort located inland of the coastal city of Kalba on the eastern seaboard of Sharjah, United Arab Emirates. It was restored as a museum and visitor attraction in April 2021.

The fort was restored and originally opened as a heritage site in December 1996. It features a two-story murabaa or tower. It encompasses an area of some 1,435 square metres and remains in the surrounding village houses date back some 500 years. The latest restoration was originally scheduled for completion at the end of 2020. It was restored as a museum and visitor attraction by the ruler of Sharjah, Sultan bin Mohammed Al Qasimi, in April 2021.

== History ==
Originally constructed in 1745, additions were made to the structure of the mudbrick, gypsum and stone structure of the fort in 1820. The fort stands on the site of an original fortification captured by the Portuguese commander Gaspar Leite in March 1624 and is of an unusual construction, with buttressing indicating that it was perhaps developed from an original watchtower under Portuguese architectural influence. It represents one of a string of fortifications on the east coast of the Emirates with Portuguese origins, others being at Khor Fakkan, Al Badiyah and Dibba.

By 1829 the fort was described as 'a fort on the side of a creek into which boats of twenty to thirty tons can go' and Kalba itself as a town of some 200 inhabitants.

=== Bait Sheikh Saeed bin Hamad Al Qasimi ===
Adjacent to the fort is the Bait Sheikh Saeed bin Hamad Al Qasimi, a traditional house constructed between 1898 and 1901 and originally opened as a museum in December 1999. The house was also restored and reopened as a museum in April 2021.

Sheikh Saeed was Ruler of Kalba from 1902, although was an absentee until the 1920s, living in Ajman and leaving the administration of Kalba to a slave named Barut. When he took up residence in Kalba again in the 1920s, it was a provocation to his secessionist Sharqiyin neighbour, Hamad bin Abdullah Al Sharqi, the ruler of Fujairah (whose rule was broadly recognised by the other Trucial rulers but not by the British), who blamed Saeed bin Hamad for the British bombardment of Fujairah Fort. The consequent conflict threatened to become serious in May 1926 and Saeed bin Hamad was forced to turn to the Sultan of Muscat for help when his plea for support to the Ruler of Sharjah, Sultan bin Saqr Al Qasimi, was ignored.

Saeed bin Hamad died on 29th April 1937, an event that led to widespread conflict involving the rulers of Ras Al Khaimah, Sharjah, Dhaid and also the British. It also resulted in Kalba, which had been granted recognition as a Trucial State in 1936, being subsumed once again into Sharjah.
