= Kalba Mangrove reserve =

Protected area in the emirate of Sharjah

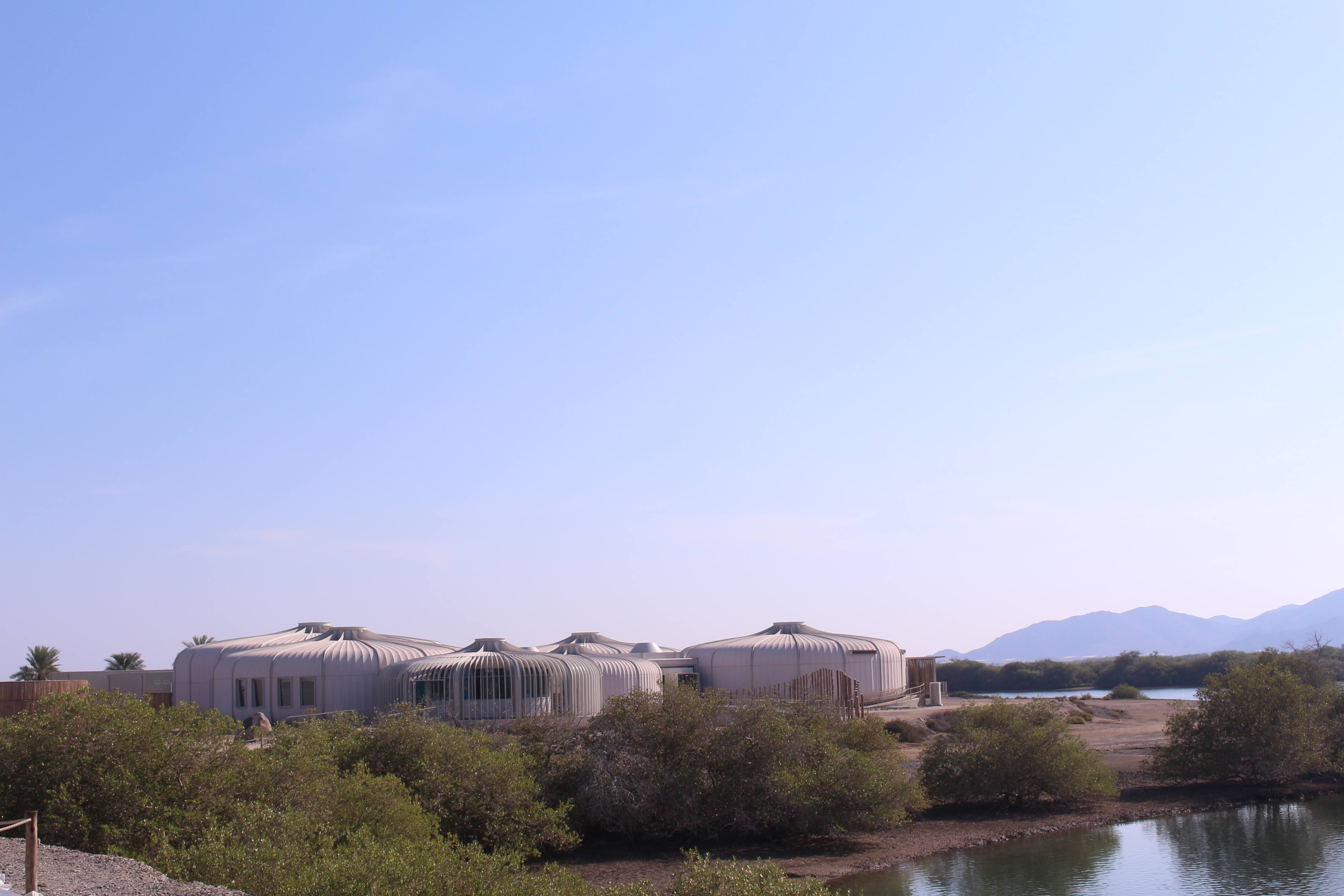
- Kalba Mangrove Center
- Interactive map of Kalba Mangrove reserve
- Type: Nature reserve
- Location: Kalba, Sharjah, United Arab Emirates
- Coordinates: 25°00′N 56°22′E

Kalba Mangrove reserve is a natural reserve to a protected natural mangrove forest located in Kalba, Sharjah. Conservation efforts around the mangrove have sought to protect the declining populations of white-collared kingfisher birds that inhabit the area.

== Flora and Fauna ==
The coastal mangrove consists of Avicennia marina, trees of the inland savanna include Ziziphus spina-christi, Prosopis cineraria and the Umbrella Thorn Acacia tortilis. The world's largest population of loggerhead sea turtle (Caretta caretta) breeds on Masirah Island and other turtles that come to these coasts include the olive ridley (Lepydochelys olivacea), green turtle (Chelonia mydas) and the endangered hawksbill turtle (Eretmochelys imbricata). The area is extremely rich in bird life. Endemic birds include a species of collared kingfisher.

== Kalba Mangrove Center ==
The Khor Kalba Mangrove Center was opened in the spring of 2021 as a sanctuary to protect the 300 year old mangrove's biodiversity and local wildlife, help rehabilitate turtles, and nurture endangered birds. It consists of several pod-like structures inspired by sea urchins with minimal environmental impact and includes a visitor center, veterinary clinics, and laboratories. Crabs, sea cucumbers, starfish, various crustaceans and sea urchins are found in the center. A number of conservationists and ecologists had expressed concern regarding the project.
