= Easton's Bible Dictionary =

Illustrated Bible dictionary compiled by Matthew George Easton

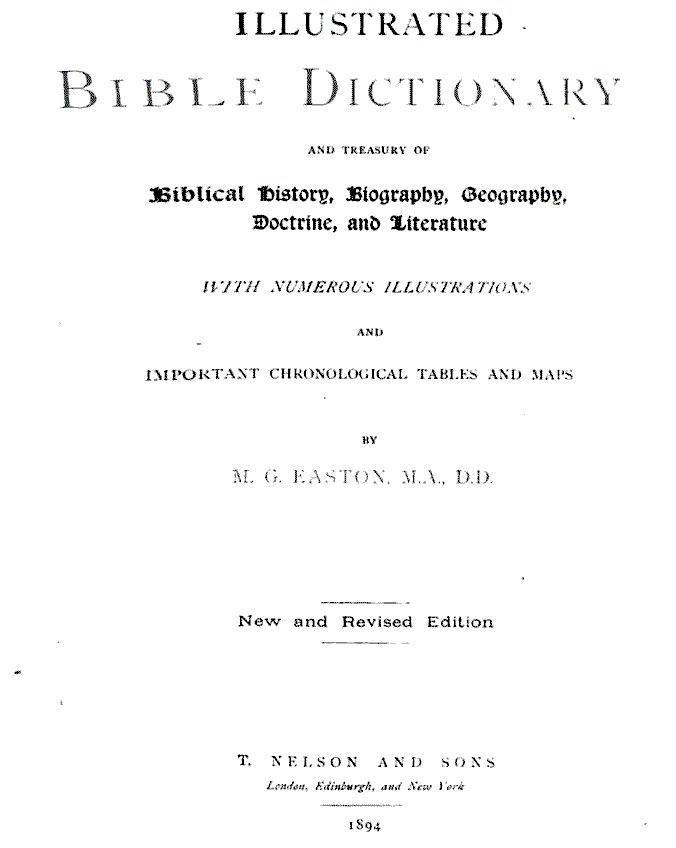
Easton's Bible Dictionary (1894) book cover

The Illustrated Bible Dictionary, (Note: Full title: Illustrated Bible Dictionary and Treasury of Biblical History, Biography, Geography, Doctrine, and Literature with Numerous Illustrations and Important Chronological Tables and Maps.) better known as Easton's Bible Dictionary, is a reference work on topics related to the Christian Bible, compiled by Matthew George Easton. The first edition was published in 1893, and a revised edition was published the following year. The most popular edition, however, was the third, published by Thomas Nelson in 1897, three years after Easton's death. The last contains nearly 4,000 entries relating to the Bible. Many of the entries in Easton's are encyclopedic in nature, although there are also short dictionary-type entries.

Because of its age, it is now a public domain resource.

== See also ==
- Bauer lexicon
- Smith's Bible Dictionary, another popular 19th-century Bible dictionary

== Editions ==
- Easton, Matthew George, ed. (1893), Illustrated Bible Dictionary..., New York: Harper & Bros.
- Easton, M.G., ed. (1894), Illustrated Bible Dictionary... (Revised ed.), London: T. Nelson & Sons
- Easton, M.G., ed. (1897), Illustrated Bible Dictionary... (also known as Easton's Bible Dictionary) (3rd ed.), London: T. Nelson & Sons
