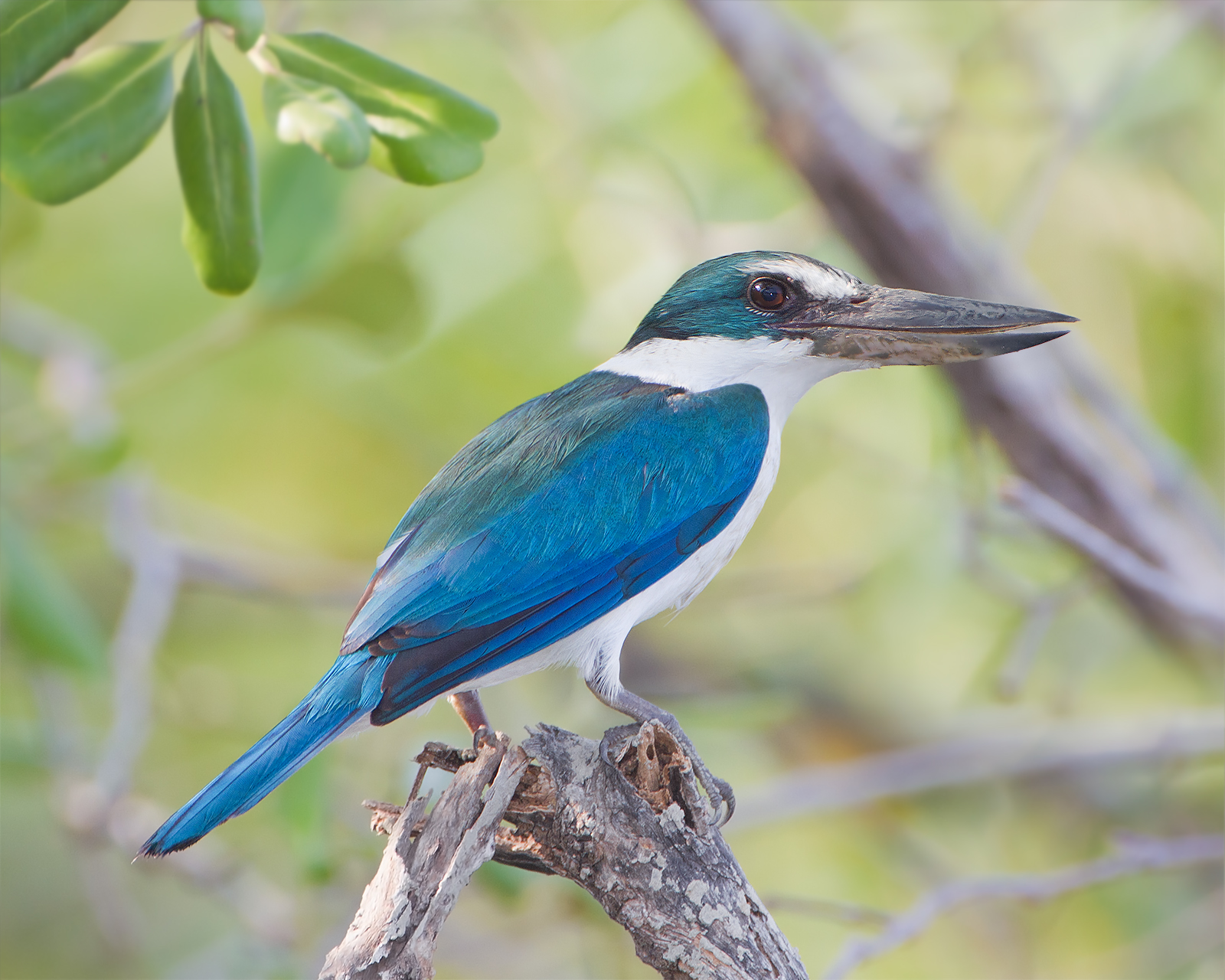
- Todiramphus chloris humii Laem Phak Bia, Phetchaburi, Thailand

Conservation status
- Least Concern (IUCN 3.1)

Scientific classification
- Kingdom: Animalia
- Phylum: Chordata
- Class: Aves
- Order: Coraciiformes
- Family: Alcedinidae
- Subfamily: Halcyoninae
- Genus: Todiramphus
- Species: T. chloris

Binomial name
- Todiramphus chloris (Boddaert, 1783)

Synonyms
- Halcyon chloris; Todirhamphus chloris

= Collared kingfisher =

Species of bird

The collared kingfisher (Todiramphus chloris) is a medium-sized kingfisher belonging to the subfamily Halcyoninae, the tree kingfishers. It is also known as the white-collared kingfisher, black-masked kingfisher or mangrove kingfisher. It has a wide range extending from the Red Sea across southern Asia to Melanesia. A number of subspecies and subspecies groups have been split from this species including the Pacific kingfisher, the Islet kingfisher, the Torresian kingfisher, the Mariana kingfisher, and the Melanesian kingfisher.

== Taxonomy ==
The collared kingfisher was described by the French polymath Georges-Louis Leclerc, Comte de Buffon in his Histoire Naturelle des Oiseaux in 1780. The bird was also illustrated in a hand-coloured plate engraved by François-Nicolas Martinet in the Planches Enluminées D'Histoire Naturelle. This was produced under the supervision of Edme-Louis Daubenton to accompany Buffon's text. Neither the plate caption nor Buffon's description included a scientific name but in 1783 the Dutch naturalist Pieter Boddaert coined the binomial name Alcedo chloris in his catalogue of the Planches Enluminées. The type locality is the island of Buru within Indonesia. The current genus Todiramphus was introduced by the French surgeon and naturalist René Lesson in 1827. The specific epithet chloris is modern Latin for 'green' or 'greenish'.

=== List of subspecies ===
There are numerous subspecies in the species' largely coastal and insular range from the Red Sea to Polynesia:

==== Red Sea and Arabian coasts ====
- T. c. abyssinicus (Pelzeln, 1856) – southern Red Sea coasts of Somalia and Arabia
- T. c. kalbaensis (Cowles, 1980) – coasts of northeastern United Arab Emirates (Khawr Kalba) and northern Oman

==== India and Indian Ocean ====
- T. c. vidali (Sharpe, 1892) – western India from Ratnagiri to Kerala.
- T. c. davisoni (Sharpe, 1892) – Andaman Islands and Coco Islands (in Bay of Bengal, south of Myanmar)
- T. c. occipitalis (Blyth, 1846) – Nicobar Islands

==== South East Asia ====
- T. c. humii (Sharpe, 1892) – coasts of West Bengal eastwards to Burma (including the Mergui Archipelago), the Malay Peninsula, Tioman and north-eastern Sumatra.
- T. c. armstrongi (Sharpe, 1892) – interior of Burma and Thailand, Indochina and eastern China
- T. c. laubmannianus (Grote, 1933) – Sumatra (excluding northeast) and Borneo, including intervening islands.
- T. c. chloropterus (Oberholser, 1919) – islands off western Sumatra
- T. c. azelus (Oberholser, 1919) – Enggano (off southwestern Sumatra)
- T. c. palmeri (Oberholser, 1919) – Java, Bali, Bawean and Kangean Islands
- T. c. collaris (Scopoli, 1786) – Philippines, including Palawan and nearby islands.

==== Wallacea, New Guinea ====
- T. c. chloris (Boddaert, 1783) – Talaud and Sangihe Islands through Sulawesi to the Lesser Sundas (east from Lombok), West Papuan Islands and north-western New Guinea (Vogelkop and Onin peninsulas).

==== Micronesia ====
- T. c. teraokai (Nagamichi Kuroda, 1915) – Palau

== Description ==
The collared kingfisher is 23 to 25 cm (9.1 to 9.8 in) long and the male weighs 51 to 90 g (1.8 to 3.2 oz), while the female weighs 54–100 g (1.9–3.5 oz). It varies from blue to green above while the underparts can be white or buff. There is a white collar around the neck, giving the bird its name. Some races have a white or buff stripe over the eye while others have a white spot between the eye and bill. There may be a black stripe through the eye. The large bill is black with a pale yellow base to the lower mandible. Females tend to be greener than the males. Immature birds are duller than the adults with dark scaly markings on the neck and breast.

It has a variety of calls which vary geographically. The most typical call is a loud, harsh and metallic "kee-kee-kee" repeated several times.

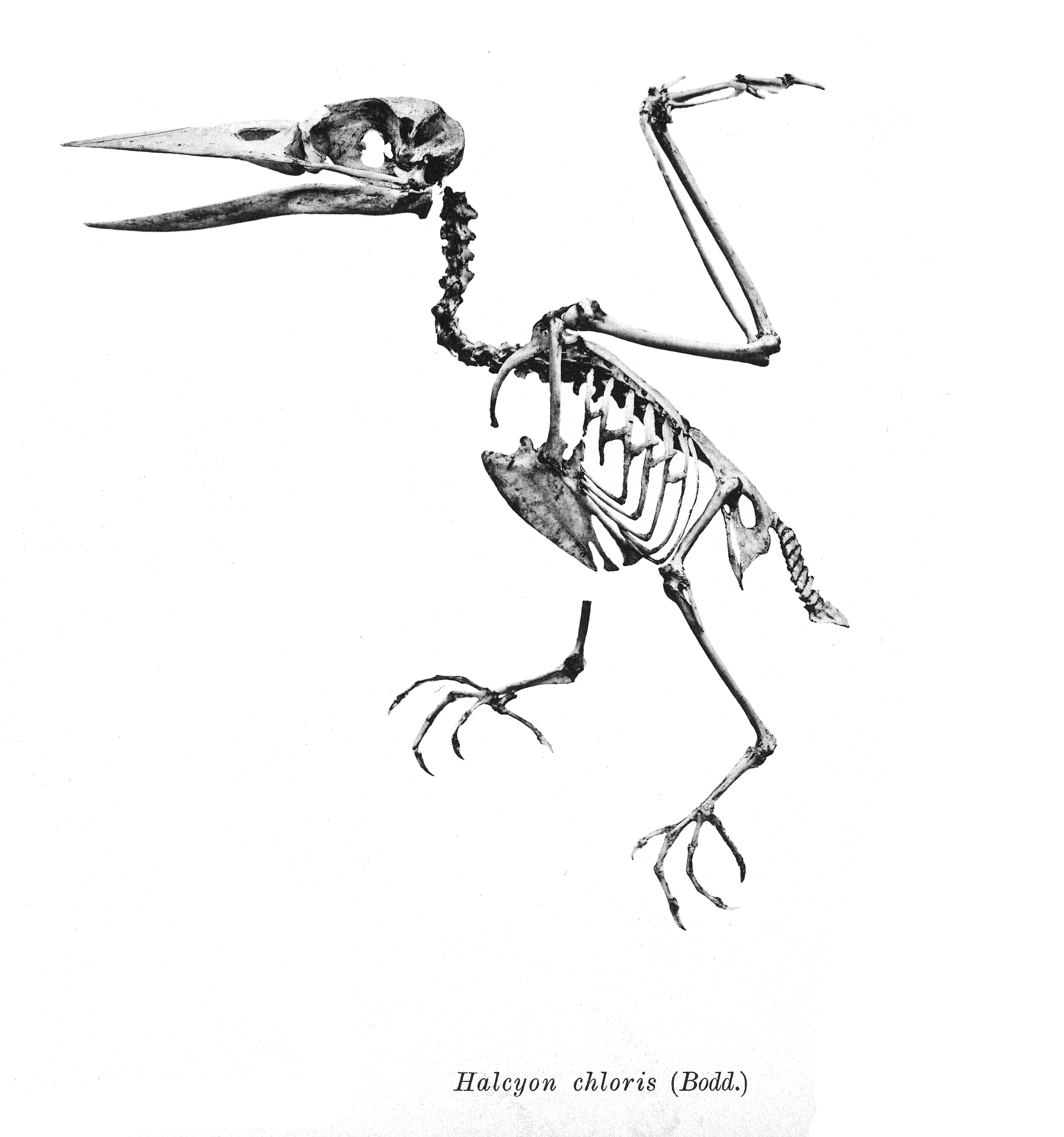
Skeleton of a collared kingfisher

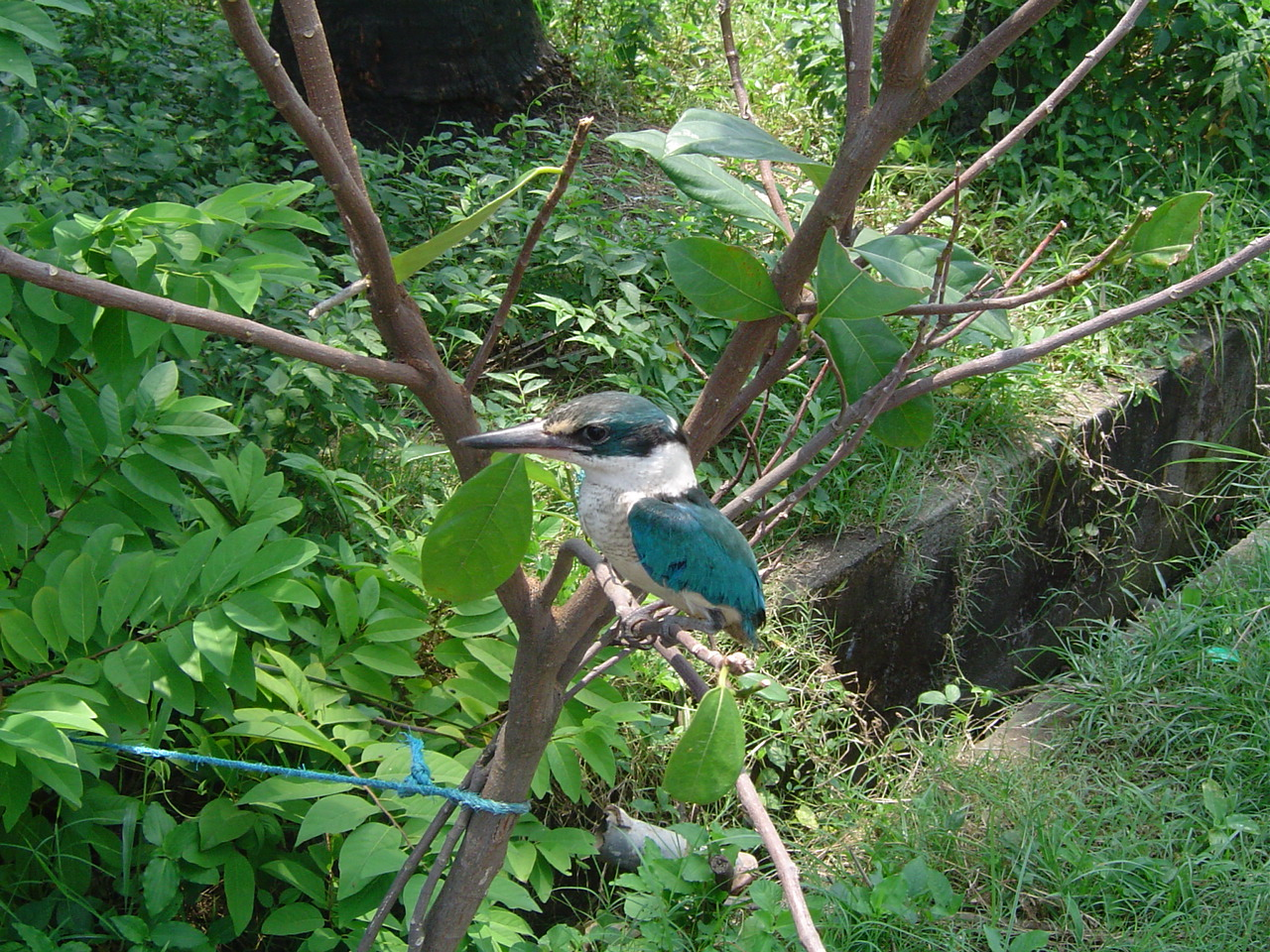
T. c. collaris, Bataan, Philippines

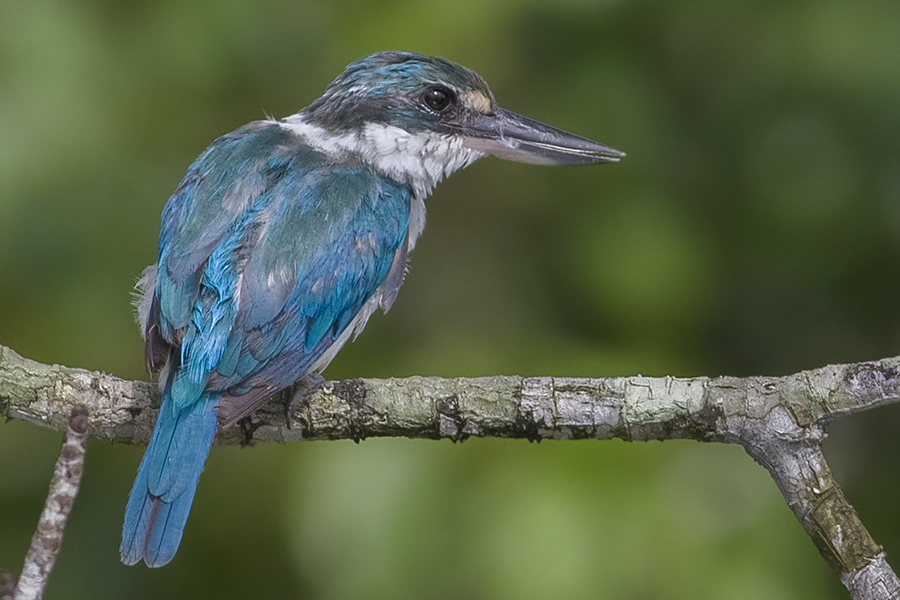
Juvenile, T. c. humii West Bengal, India

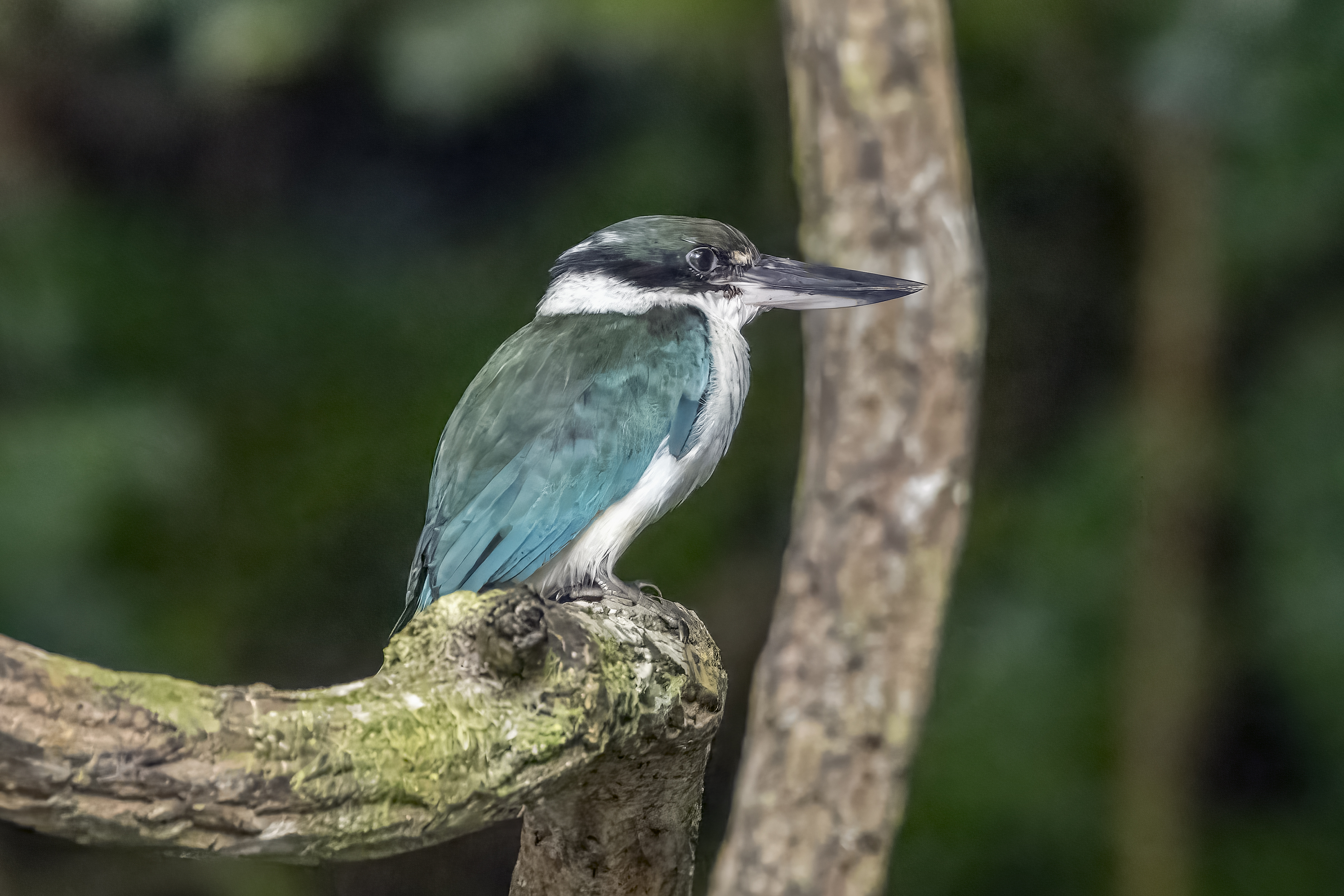
T. c. teraokai, Palau

== Distribution and habitat ==
It is most commonly found in coastal areas, particularly in mangrove swamps. It also inhabits farmland, open woodland, grassland and gardens. In some parts of its range, especially on islands, it can be seen further inland, ranging into forest or into mountain areas. Birds often perch conspicuously on wires, rocks or bare branches.

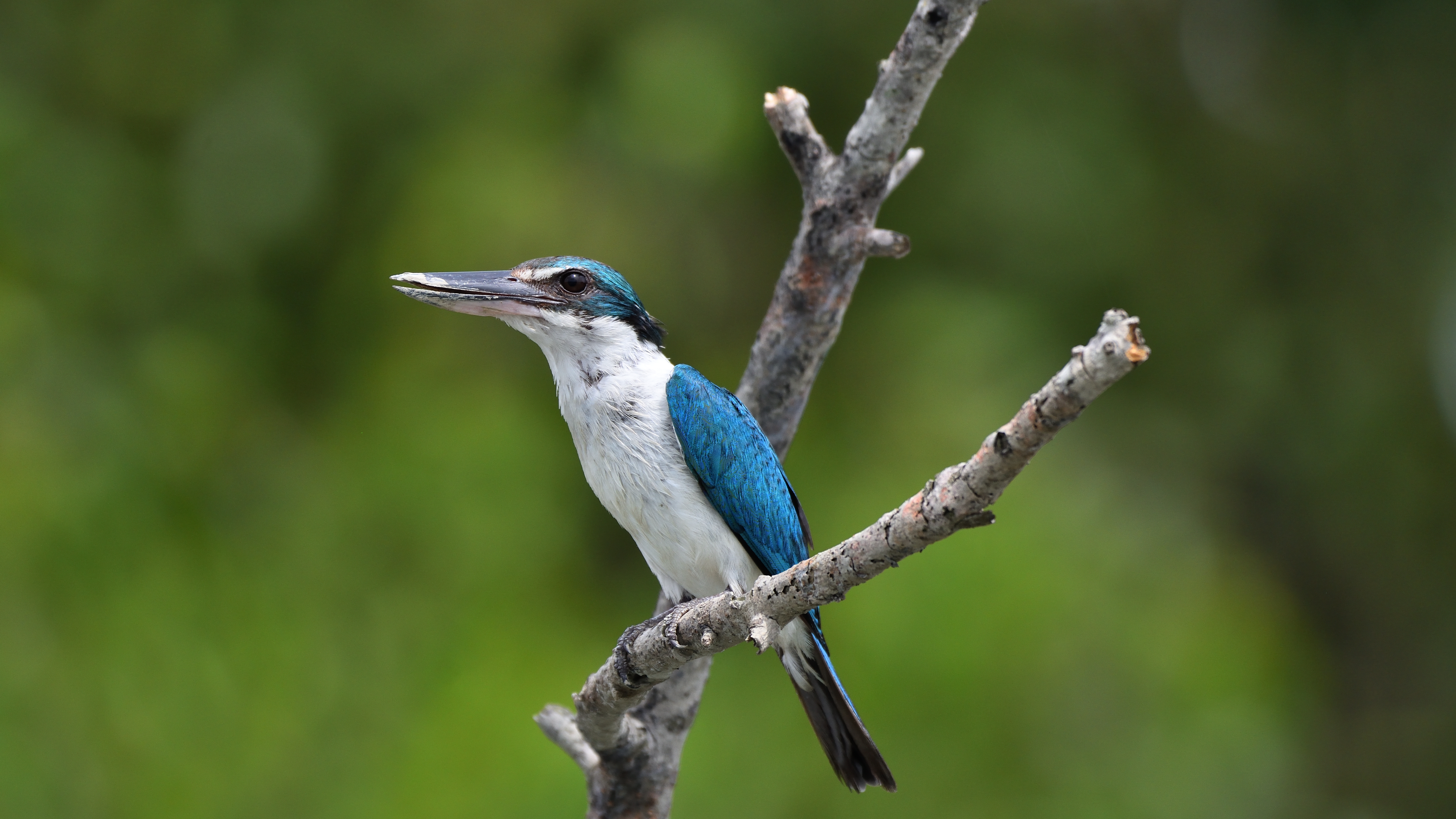
T. c. humii at Sunderbans, West Bengal

The subspecies that occurs furthest west in the Eurasian/African landmass is T. c. abyssinica of north-east Africa, which is found in patches of mangroves in Eritrea and has also been recorded from Sudan and Somalia. Further east in Arabia is the endangered race T. c. kalbaensis with a population of 55 pairs or fewer; these are almost entirely restricted to Khor Kalba in the United Arab Emirates, but breeding has also occurred recently at Khor Shinas in Oman. Further subspecies occur locally around the coasts of India and Bangladesh and on the Andaman and Nicobar Islands. In Southeast Asia and Indonesia as well as Philippines, the species is widespread and common, occurring far inland in some regions.

== Feeding ==
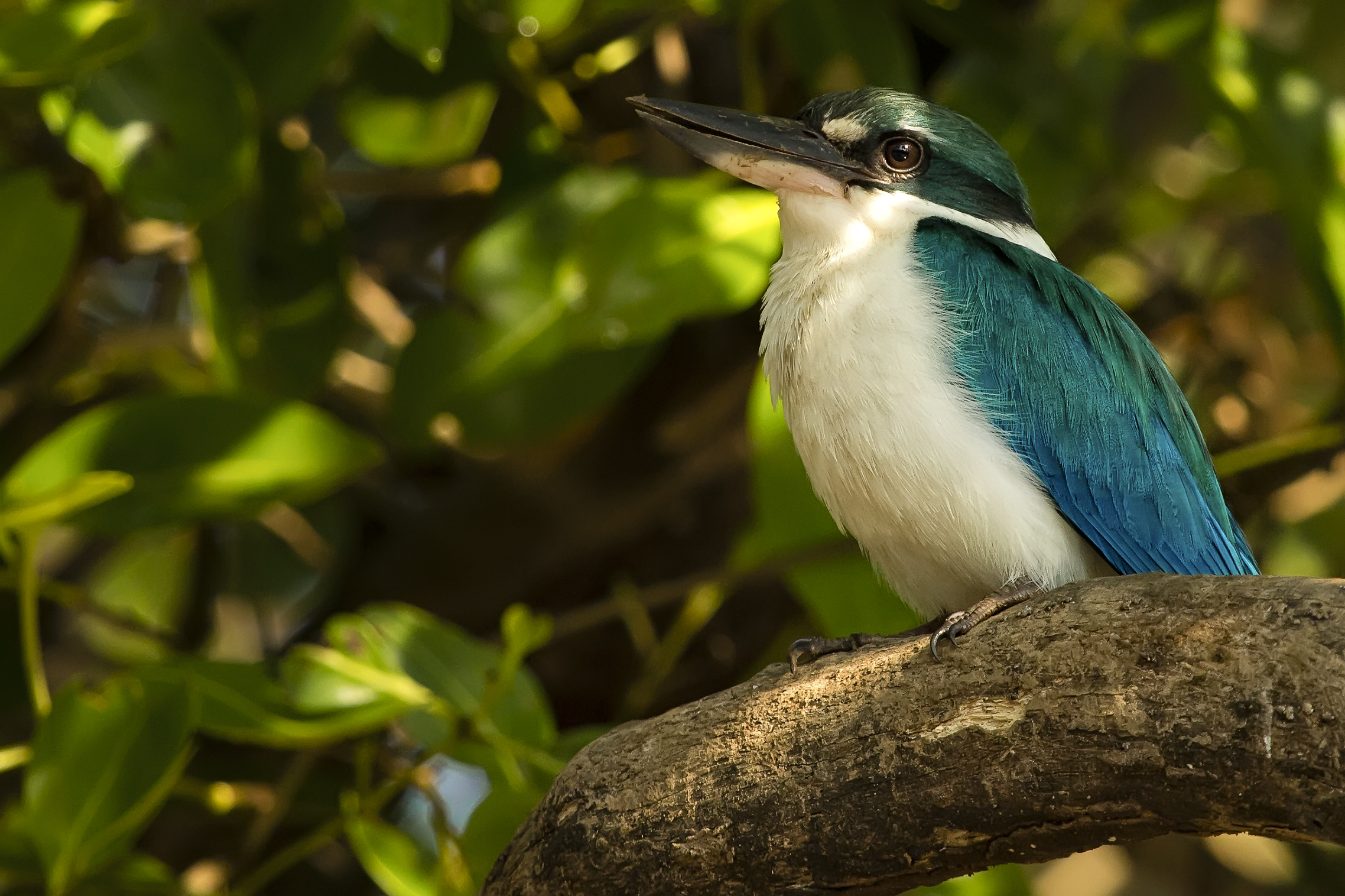
An individual at Zuari River, Goa, India

Small crabs and shrimps are the favoured food in coastal regions but a wide variety of other animals are eaten including insects (including beetles, cicadas, stick-insects, grasshoppers, moths and butterflies), spiders, earthworms, snails, frogs, lizards, small snakes, small fish, and sometimes small birds and mice. The collared kingfisher perches almost motionless for long periods waiting for prey. When it spots something it glides down to catch it and then flies back to the perch where larger items are pounded against the branch to subdue them. Any indigestible remains are regurgitated as pellets.

== Reproduction ==
The nest is a hole, either a natural tree hole or a burrow excavated by the birds themselves in a rotten tree, arboreal termite nest or earth bank. They will also occupy old woodpecker holes. A clutch of usually two to five rounded, whitish eggs are laid directly on the floor of the burrow with no nest material used. Both parents take part in incubating the eggs and feeding the chicks. The young birds leave the nest about 44 days after hatching. Two broods are often raised in a year.

== Conservation status ==
With a very wide distribution and common to abundant population, the collared kingfisher is classed as least concern on the IUCN Red List.
