= Kalba =

Kalba كَلْبَاء
- City
- Kalba
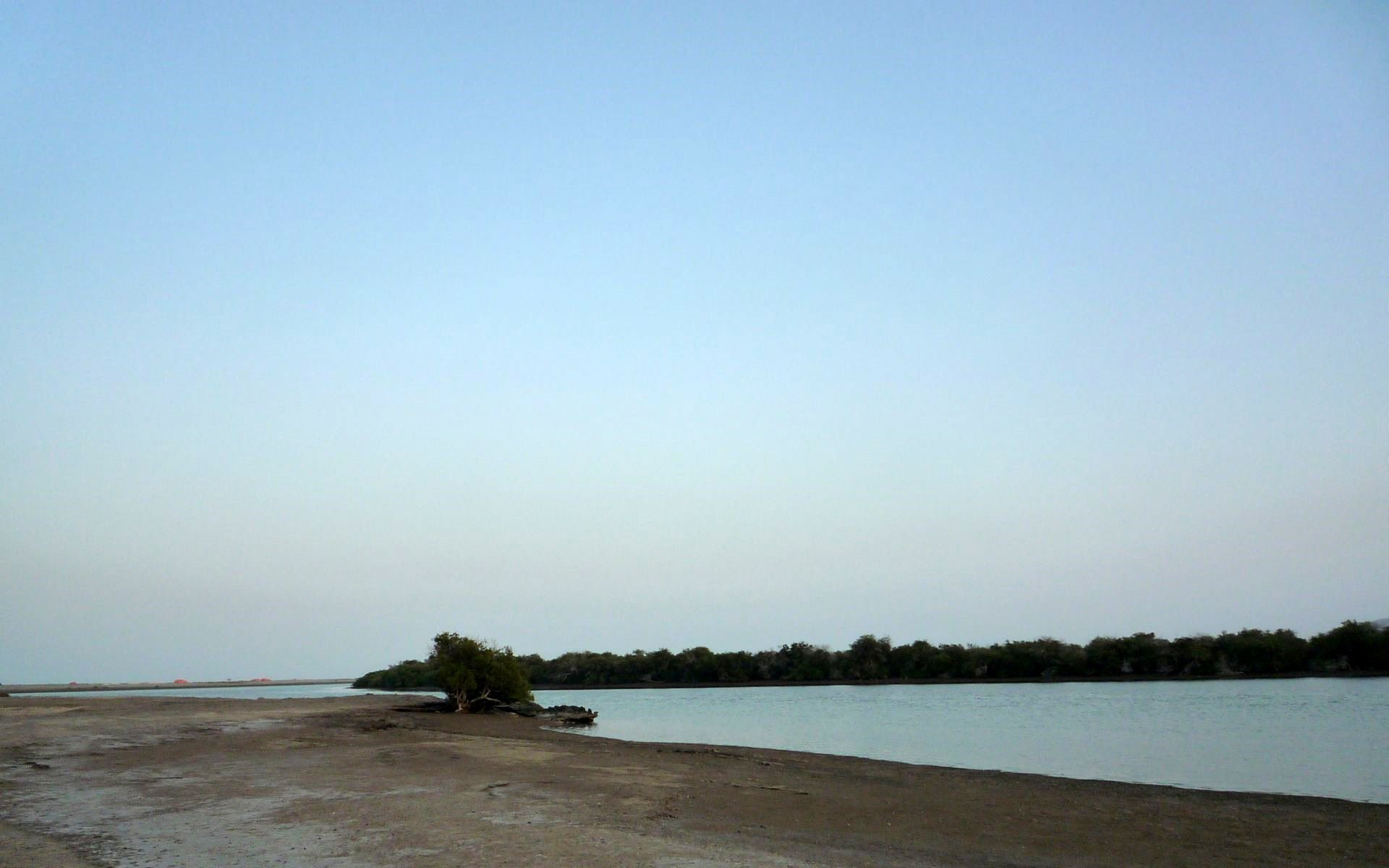
- Mangrove swamp in Kalba

- Location of Kalba
- Coordinates: 25°04′27″N 56°21′19″E
- Country: United Arab Emirates
- Emirate: Sharjah

Government
  - Ruler: Sultan bin Muhammad Al Qasimi

Population (2022)
  - Total: 51,000
- Time zone: UTC+4 (UAE standard time)

Kalba (Arabic: كَلْبَاء, romanized: Kalbāʾ) is a city in the Emirate of Sharjah, United Arab Emirates. It is an exclave of Sharjah on the Gulf of Oman coast, north of the border with Oman. Khor Kalba, an inlet and mangrove habitat south of the city, is known for its ecological importance and conservation areas.

Kalba Mangrove reserve is open to the public and was developed as an eco-tourism resort by the Sharjah Investment and Development Authority (Shurooq). A number of conservationists and ecologists have expressed concern regarding the project.

== History ==
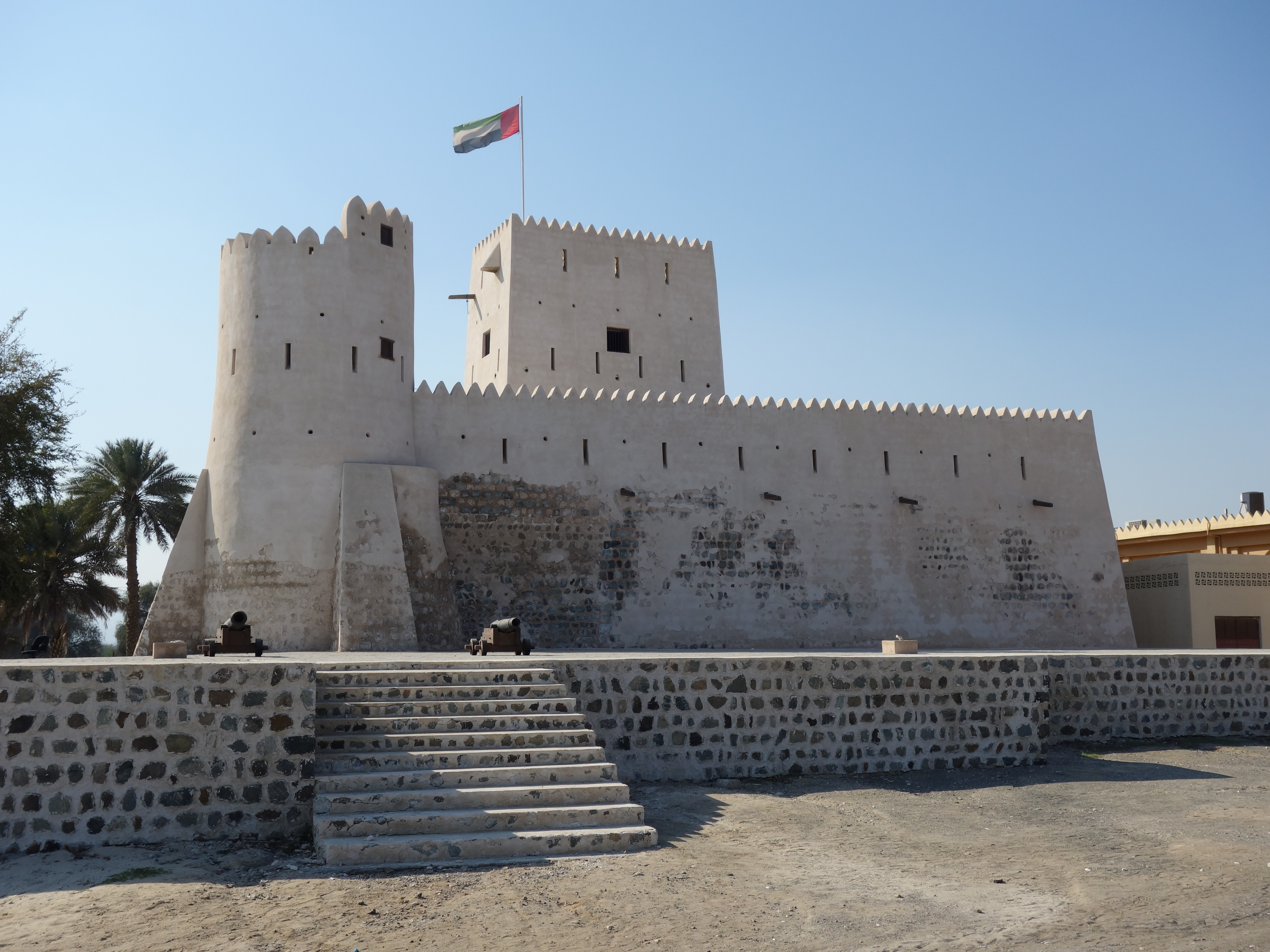
Kalba Fort.

Shell middens dating back to the fourth millennium BCE have been found at Kalba, as well as extensive remains of the Bronze Age Umm Al Nar culture. An extensive and important assembly of petroglyphs lies to the south of Kalba at Khatm Melaha.

=== Archaeology ===
Archaeological investigations at Kalba have identified occupation spanning several periods of prehistory, including the Bronze Age and Iron Age. The site known as Kalba K4 is a group of archaeological mounds near the modern city. It includes an Early Bronze Age mud-brick tower associated with the Umm an-Nar period, and evidence of later occupation. Excavations were first conducted by Carl Phillips between 1993 and 2001, and research was subsequently resumed through cooperation between the Sharjah Archaeology Authority and the Institute of Oriental and European Archaeology of the Austrian Academy of Sciences.

Fieldwork at Kalba K4 has documented architectural remains and stratigraphic evidence from the Early Bronze Age through later periods. The 2020 expedition examined the site's stratigraphic sequence, including the remains of the Early Bronze Age tower, Middle Bronze Age deposits and a later mud-brick wall. The investigation also used three-dimensional photogrammetry to document a section of the archaeological profile. Research on the site's material remains has also contributed to the study of its economic activities and external contacts. Analysis of fish remains from Kalba K4 identified a range of marine resources exploited by the community during the Bronze Age and Iron Age. A separate study of the site's archaeological evidence investigates Kalba's participation in exchange networks connecting coastal communities with routes through the interior of south-eastern Arabia.

Another important archaeological site in the Kalba area is Khatm Al-Melaha, known for its rock engravings. The site forms part of the UNESCO World Heritage Tentative List nomination entitled The Rock Art of the Emirate of Sharjah, submitted in 2023. The nomination includes rock-art sites in both Kalba and Khor Fakkan and describes engravings representing several phases of artistic activity, tentatively extending from the fifth millennium BCE to much later periods. The nomination is not an inscription on the World Heritage List.

=== Portuguese ===
The town was captured by the Portuguese Empire in the 16th century and was referred to as Ghallah. It was part of a series of fortified cities that the Portuguese used to control access to the Persian Gulf and the Gulf of Oman, e.g. Khor Fakan, Muscat, Sohar, Seeb, Qurayyat, Muttrah. Kalba Fort, today restored as a museum, is thought to have been constructed on Portuguese foundations.

It was attacked and sacked by the Sultan of Muscat Sayyid Said's forces in March 1811 as part of an Omani campaign against the maritime forces of Al-Qasimi. It was a Trucial State from 1936 to 1951, before being reincorporated into Sharjah.

Kalba was still being referred to as Ghallah at the time of J. G. Lorimer's 1906 survey of the Persian Gulf and Oman, when it consisted of some 300 areesh (date palm frond) houses, of Naqbiyin, Sharqiyin, Kunud and Abadilah tribes as well as a number of Baluchis and Persians. It was home to ten boats trading with ports in the Persian Gulf and India.

Majid bin Sultan bin Saqr Al Qasimi was granted the Shamaliyah region, including Kalba, as a fiefdom by his brother, Sheikh Salim bin Sultan Al Qasimi, Ruler of Sharjah. Kalba was subsequently ruled jointly by his two sons Hamad bin Majid and Ahmad bin Majid.

Hamad's son Said Bin Hamad Al Qasimi succeeded him in 1902, at the time when the ruler of neighbouring Fujairah, Hamad bin Abdallah Al Sharqi, managed to establish independence. Said bin Hamad lived in Ajman, leaving the administration of Kalba in the hands of a slave named Barut.

=== Trucial state ===
By the 1920s, Said bin Hamad took up residency in Kalba again and in 1936 was recognised by the British as a Trucial Ruler as an incentive to grant landing rights to an emergency air-strip as a backup to the Imperial Airways runway and fort at Al-Mahatta in the city of Sharjah.

In April 1937, the deposed Ruler of Sharjah, Khalid bin Ahmad Al Qasimi, married Aisha, the daughter of Sheikh Said bin Hamad Al Qasimi. Said bin Hamad died suddenly at the end of April 1937 while visiting Khor Fakkan. Said bin Hamad's son, Hamad, was still a minor and so Aisha moved quickly to establish a regency, travelling to Kalba and organising the town's defences. For many years Said bin Hamad had lived in Ajman and entrusted a slave by the name of Barut to manage Kalba on his behalf, and Aisha now arranged for Barut to once again take charge as Wali. She sent a message to Khalid bin Ahmad, who was in Ras Al Khaimah at the time.

A period of intense political infighting and negotiation between the many involved parties now followed. In June 1937, the notable residents of Kalba selected the slave Barut as Regent for the 12-year-old Hamad, but this solution was not accepted by the British, and Khalid bin Ahmad was selected as regent. Increasingly seen as an influential and unifying figure by the Bedouin and the townspeople of the East Coast, he ruled over Dhaid and Kalba (delegating his rule in Kalba to Barut and choosing himself to live in Dhaid and Al Heera) until 1950, when he was too old and infirm to take a further role in affairs. He died that year, leaving Hamad bin Said, who had reached his majority, as Ruler of Kalba. Hamad was killed in 1951 by Saqr bin Sultan Al Qasimi, son of the overthrown Ruler of Ras Al Khaimah. Although there are British records of an insurgency in 1952 this appears to have been settled and the rule of Kalba subsequently reverted to the direct administration of Sharjah.

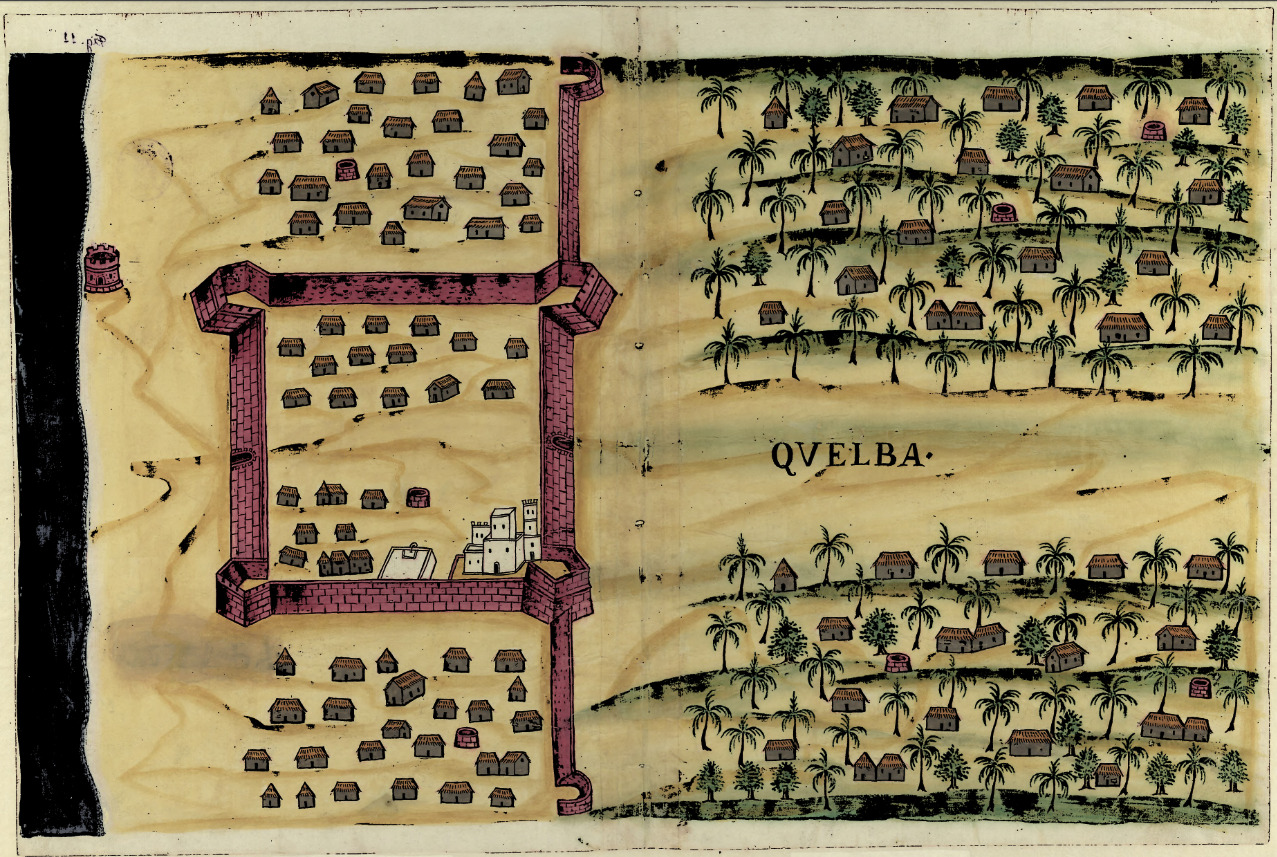
The Portuguese Fort Kalba (Quelba), from the Book of Blueprints of all Forts, Cities, and Towns in the State of East India by António Bocarro [1635].

That notwithstanding, there were almost constant outbreaks of squabbling and disputes between Kalba and neighbouring Fujairah (itself only recognised as a Trucial State by the British in 1952) which broke out into open fighting over a land dispute after the UAE was founded in 1971 and, in 1972 the newly founded Union Defence Force was called in to take control of the fighting which, by the time the UDF moved in, had killed 22 and seriously injured a dozen more. The dispute was finally settled after mediation between Sheikh Rashid of Dubai and other Rulers and a statement announcing the settlement sent out on 17 July 1972.

== City access ==
Khor Kalba is accessible by three roads.

The first merges after Wadi Al Helou (Arabic: وَادِي ٱلْحلًو) tunnel with Maliha Road (Arabic: شارع مليحة) which finally leads to the Sharjah-Kalba Road (90 km (56 miles)) from Sharjah International Airport. There is also the Fujairah-Kalba Road (8 km (5.0 miles)).

The Khor Kalba Road extends until the border with Oman at Khatm Melaha, and is one of the exit–entry points between the UAE and Oman.

== Sultan bin Muhammad Al Qasimi Development Projects ==
Sultan bin Muhammad Al Qasimi, Ruler of Sharjah and member of the Supreme Council, announced in July 2020 that several development projects are to be implemented in Kalba. These include the restoration of historical sites, the development of the corniche, the renovation of public spaces, the construction of new buildings, and others.

=== Kalba Beach Corniche ===
Launched in April 2021, the Kalba Beach Corniche project included improvements to rainwater drainage, a running track, public seating areas and tree planting.

=== Kalba Ice Factory ===
The Kalba Ice Factory was built in the 1970s to provide ice for the local fishing industry. The ice was used to preserve freshly caught fish during transport, including shipments to Dubai. After standing derelict for decades, the building was adapted by the Sharjah Art Foundation as an art space and cultural venue.

=== Kalba Clocktower ===
The Kalba Clocktower and its surrounding square were inaugurated by the ruler of Sharjah in March 2022. The tower stands 60 metres tall and includes viewing decks overlooking the city and coastline.

== Rulers ==
- Majid bin Sultan Al Qasimi (1871–1900)
- Hamad bin Majid Al Qasimi (1900–1903)
- Said ibn Hamad Al Qasimi (1903–30 April 1937)
- Hamad bin Said Al Qasimi (30 April 1937 – 1951)
- Saqr bin Sultan Al Qasimi (1951–1952; Ruler of Sharjah from 1951 to 1965)

Britain recognized Kalba on 8 December 1936, and it was re-incorporated into Sharjah in 1952.

== Gallery ==
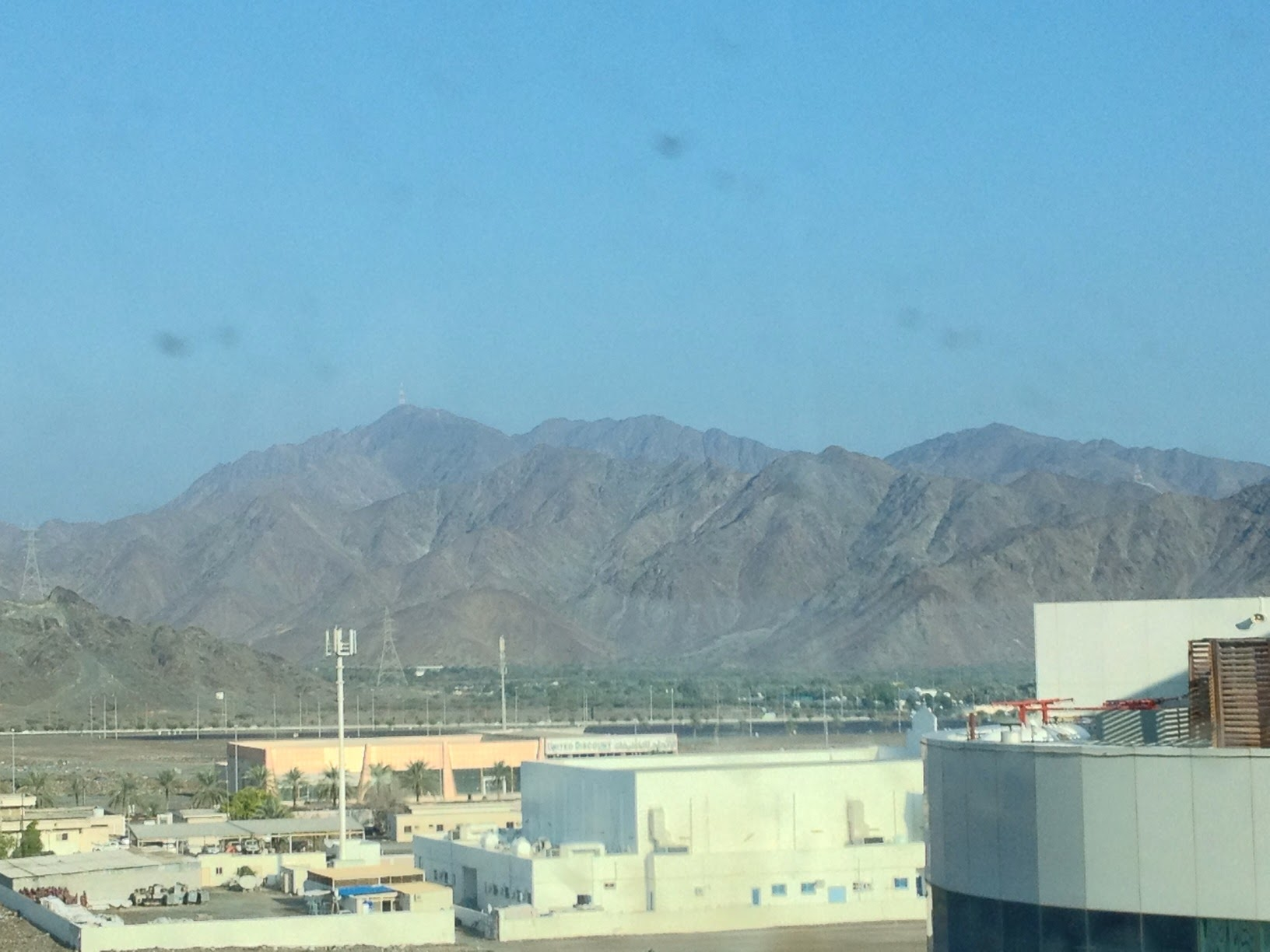
The Shumayliyyah Mountains near Kalba

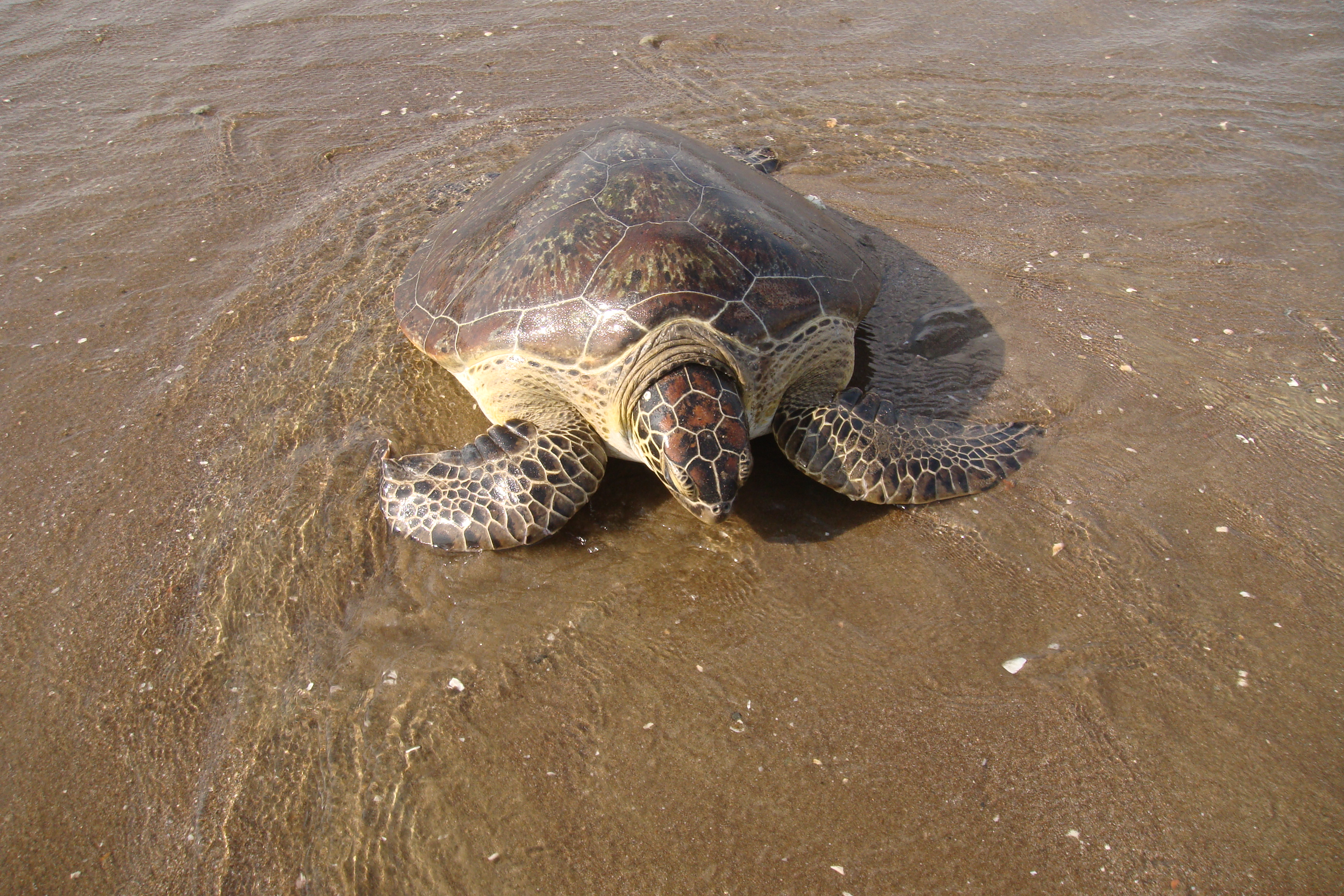
Hawksbill sea turtle

== See also ==
- Al Hefaiyah Conservation Centre
- Emirate of Sharjah
- Sharjah
- Sharjah Electricity and Water Authority
- Khor Kalba Nature Reserve

== Bibliography ==
- Eddisford, Daniel; Phillips, Colin (2009). "Kalbā in the Third Millennium (Emirate of Sharjah, UAE)". Proceedings of the Seminar for Arabian Studies. 39: 99–112.
- Lidour, K. (2023). "A Bronze to Iron Age fishing economy at Kalbāʾ 4 (Emirate of Sharjah, United Arab Emirates)". Arabian Archaeology and Epigraphy. 34: 44–62. doi:10.1111/aae.12227.
- Schwall, Christoph; Jasim, Sabah H. (2020). "Assessing Kalba: new fieldwork at a Bronze Age coastal site on the Gulf of Oman (Emirate of Sharjah, UAE)". Proceedings of the Seminar for Arabian Studies. 50: 321–332.
- Schwall, Christoph; Börner, Mario; Brandl, Michael (2023). "Report on the 2020 Austrian Archaeological Expedition at Kalba (K4)". Annual Sharjah Archaeology. 21: 23–32.
- Schwall, Christoph; Börner, Mario; Brandl, Michael; Blattner, David; Ostmann, Felix (2023). "Report on the 2022 Austrian-German Archaeological Expedition at Kalba (K4)". Annual Sharjah Archaeology. 21: 33–43.
- Schwall, Christoph; Brandl, Michael; Börner, Mario; Lindauer, Susanne; Deckers, Katleen; David-Cuny, Hélène; Yousif, Eisa; Jasim, Sabah A.; Horejs, Barbara (2024). "Kalba: research on trade networks of a prehistoric coastal community on the Gulf of Oman, United Arab Emirates". Antiquity. 98 (399): 1–8. doi:10.15184/aqy.2024.45.
