= Matthew George Easton =

Presbyterian preacher and biblical scholar from Scotland (1823–1894)

Matthew George Easton (3 June 1823 – 27 February 1894) was a Scottish minister and writer. His most known work is the Illustrated Bible Dictionary (1893), later known as Easton's Bible Dictionary.

The English translations of two of Franz Delitzsch's commentaries are among his other works.

He studied at the University of Glasgow and served as minister of the Reformed Presbyterian Church in Girvan 1848, then Darvel 1861, then Free Church Darvel 1876 to death on the amalgamation of the RPC and Free Church of Scotland.
