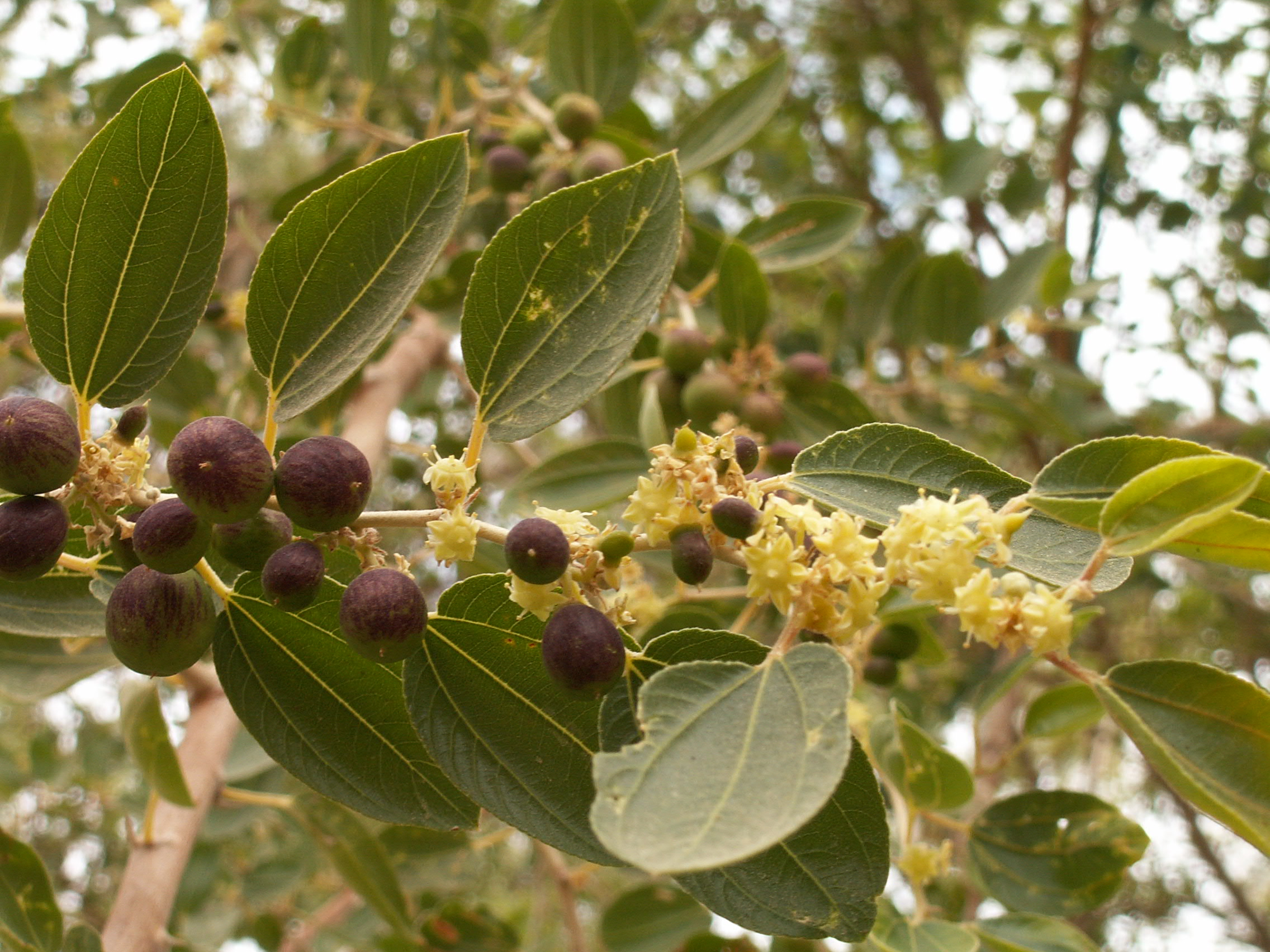

Conservation status
- Least Concern (IUCN 3.1)

Scientific classification
- Kingdom: Plantae
- Clade: Tracheophytes
- Clade: Angiosperms
- Clade: Eudicots
- Clade: Rosids
- Order: Rosales
- Family: Rhamnaceae
- Genus: Ziziphus
- Species: Z. spina-christi

Binomial name
- Ziziphus spina-christi (L.) Desf.

Varieties
- Ziziphus spina-christi var. aucheri (Boiss.) Qaiser & Nazim.; Ziziphus spina-christi var. spina-christi

Synonyms
- Girtanneria spina-christi (L.) Neck., opus utique oppr.; Rhamnus spina-christi L.; Ziziphus napeca Lam., nom. illeg. superfl.

= Ziziphus spina-christi =

Species of tree

Ziziphus spina-christi, known as the Christ's thorn jujube, is a thorny and evergreen tree or plant.

== Distribution and habitat ==
It is native to the Western Asia from the Levant and Sinai to Pakistan, southern Iran, the Arabian Peninsula, and northeastern, eastern, and western Africa from Senegal to Somalia, Egypt, and Tanzania. It grows in deserts, semi-deserts, and savannas, often in wadis and washes, on stream and river banks, and wadis and washes where groundwater is available.

== Ecology ==
In the Levant, it grows in valleys up to an elevation of 500 metres (1,600 ft), and is drought tolerant and heat-resistant. The seed, contained within a small, oblong woody pit, is opened and eaten by local fauna, including the rock hyrax.

== Uses ==
The ripe fruits are edible.

Historically, it was utilized in ancient Egyptian medicine for its supposed anti-inflammatory properties, specifically in treating pain, swelling, and heat. An in vitro study has suggested that the plant may have anti-inflammatory properties, identifying active compounds such as epigallocatechin and gallocatechin that inhibit inflammatory pathways like NF-κB.

== In culture ==
In the Levant and wider Middle East, it is called sidr (associated with the lote tree of the Quran), and is common in the Jordan Valley and around Jerusalem, as well as in the Hajar Mountains of the United Arab Emirates. By some traditions, it was the tree from which the crown of thorns of Jesus was made. Matthew George Easton argues that Z. spina-christi is too brittle to be bent into a crown, and suggests another local plant, Ziziphus lotus.

The oldest known Z. spina-christi is located in Ir Ovot southern Israel. It is estimated to be between 1500 and 2000 years old. It is believed locally to be the very tree from which Jesus' crown of thorns was made. It is the national tree of Qatar.

In the Philippines, the Blaan people called it dadiangas. This was the former name of the city of General Santos.

== Gallery ==
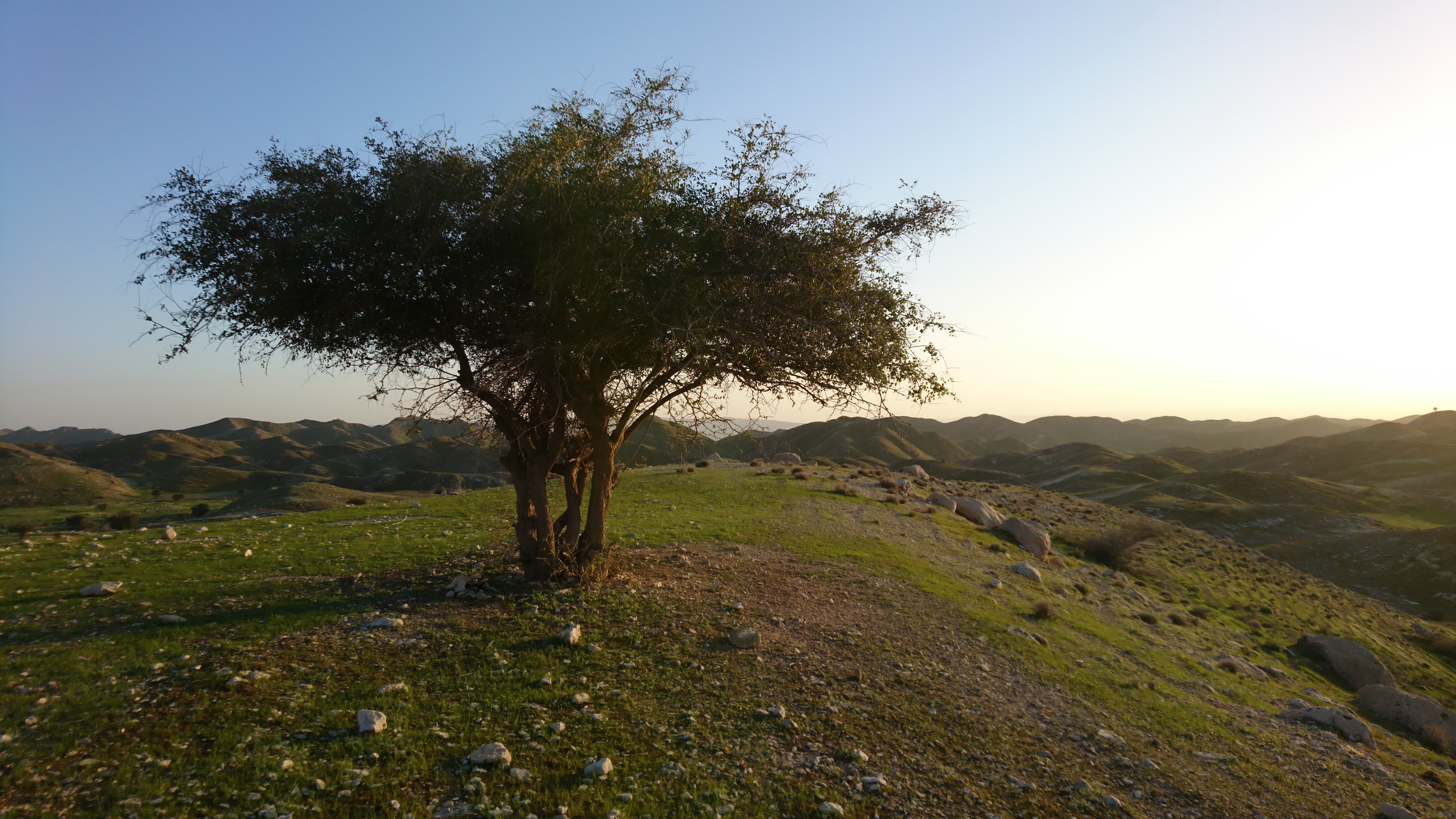
Wild tree in Iran

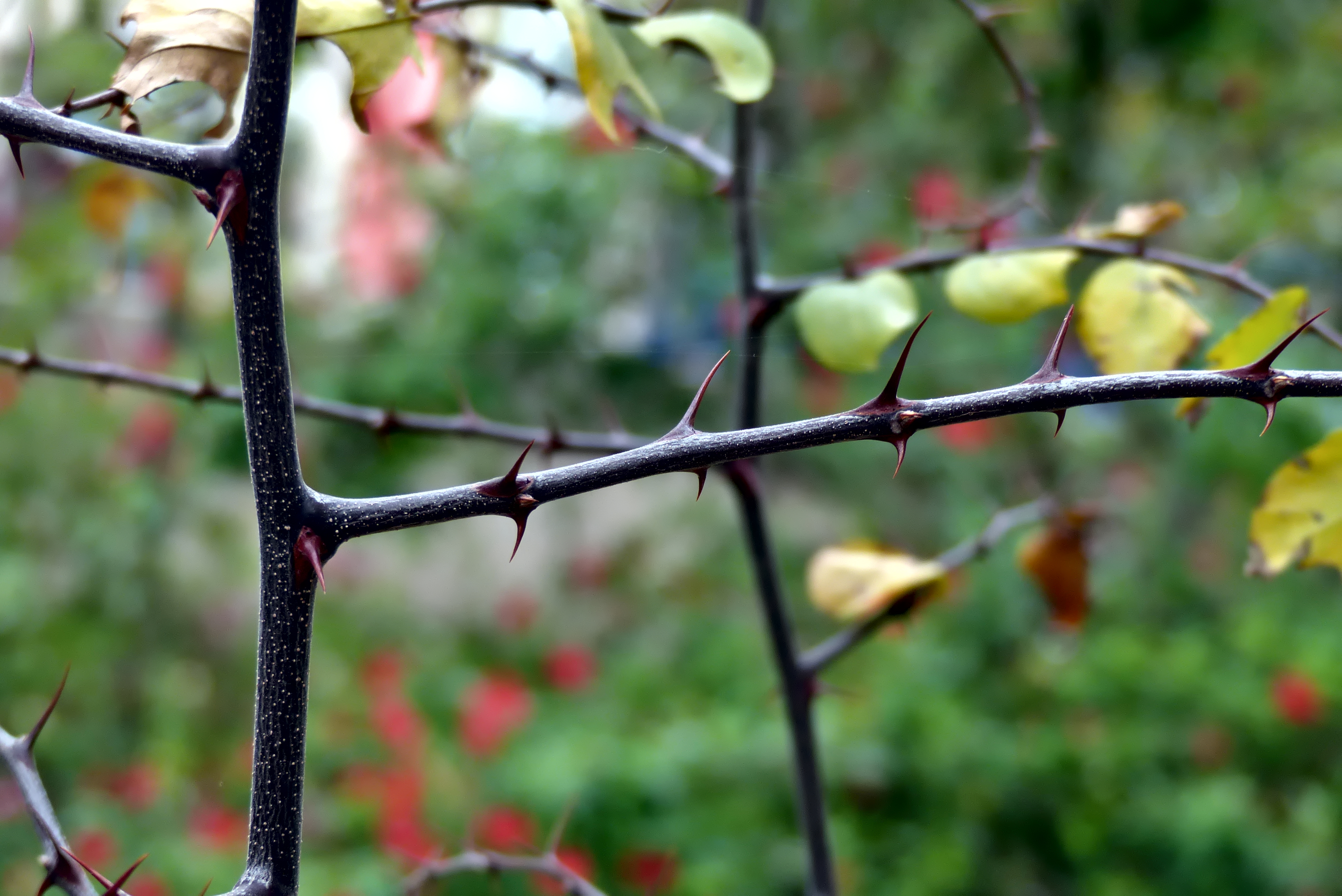
Thorns, Jardin des plantes, France

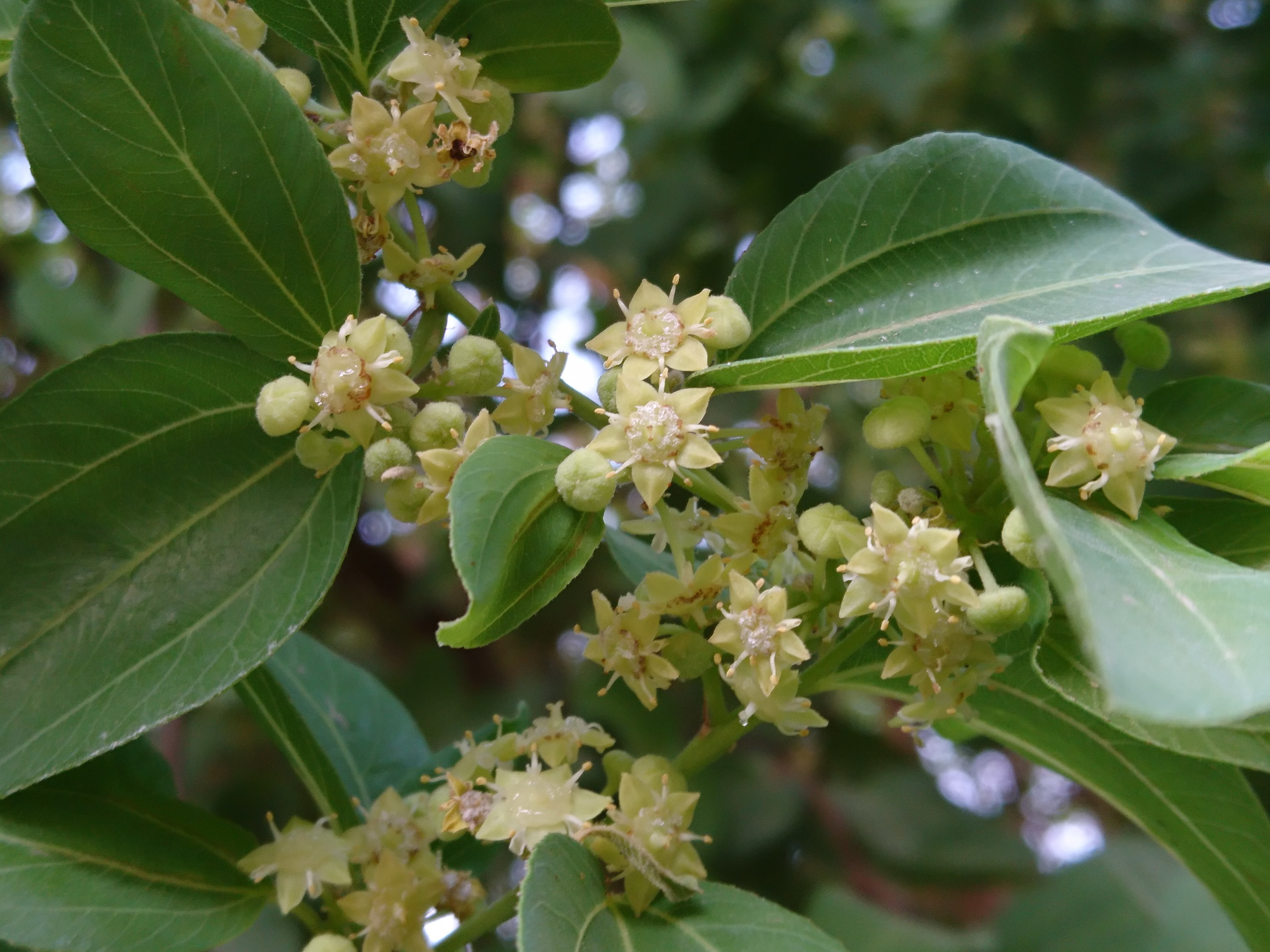
Blossom, Behbahan, Iran

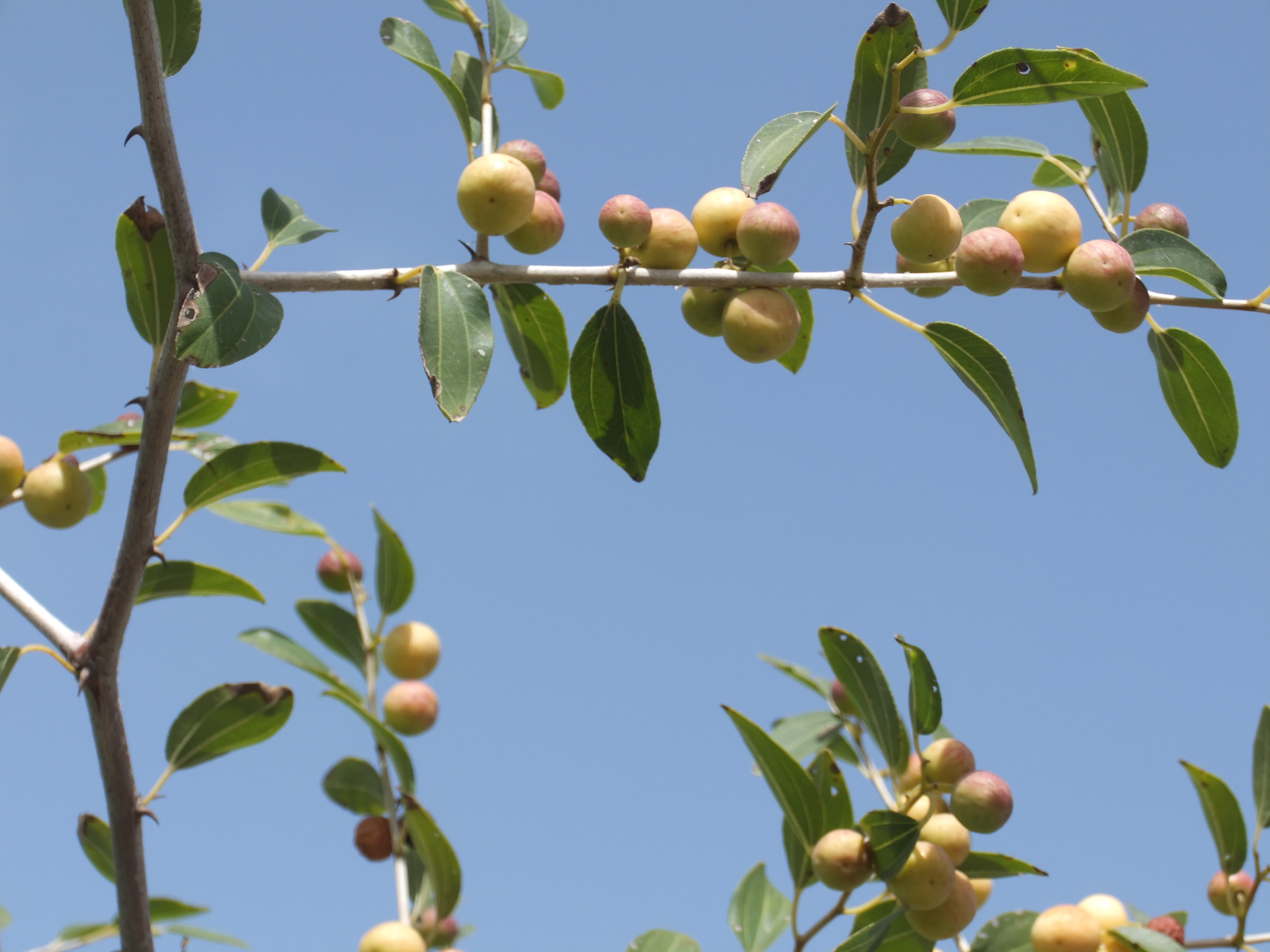
Fruit, in Israel

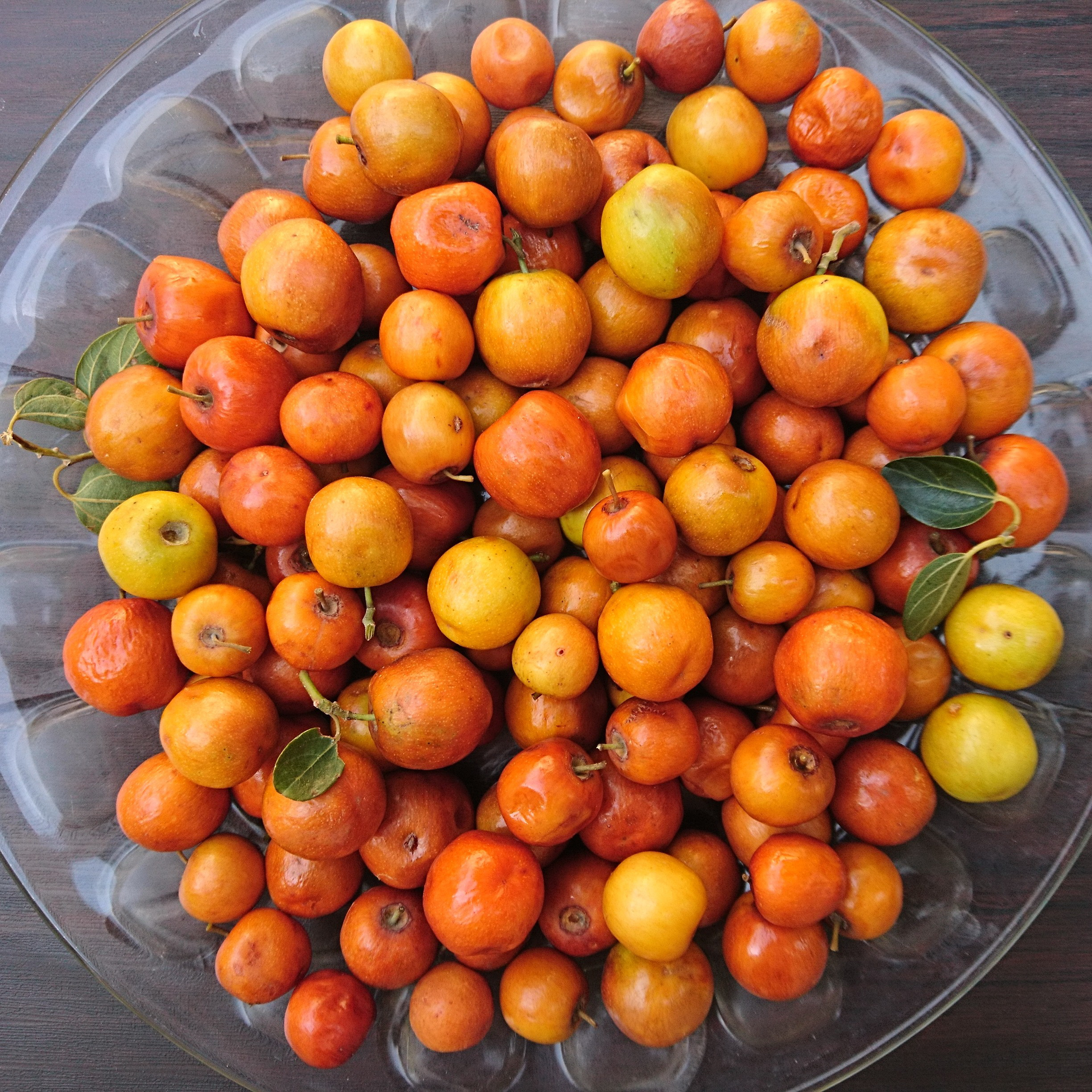
Fruit, Behbahan, Iran

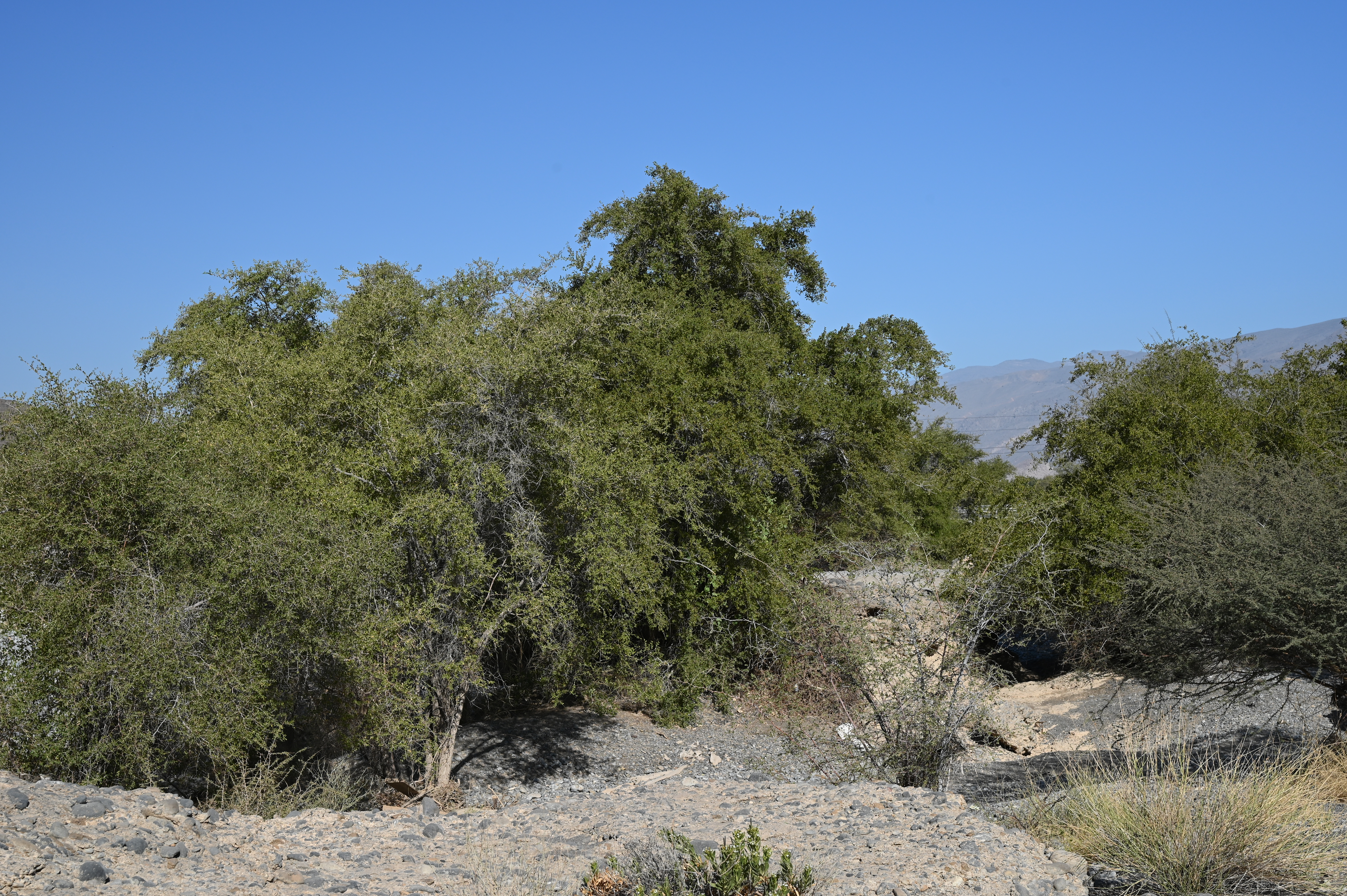

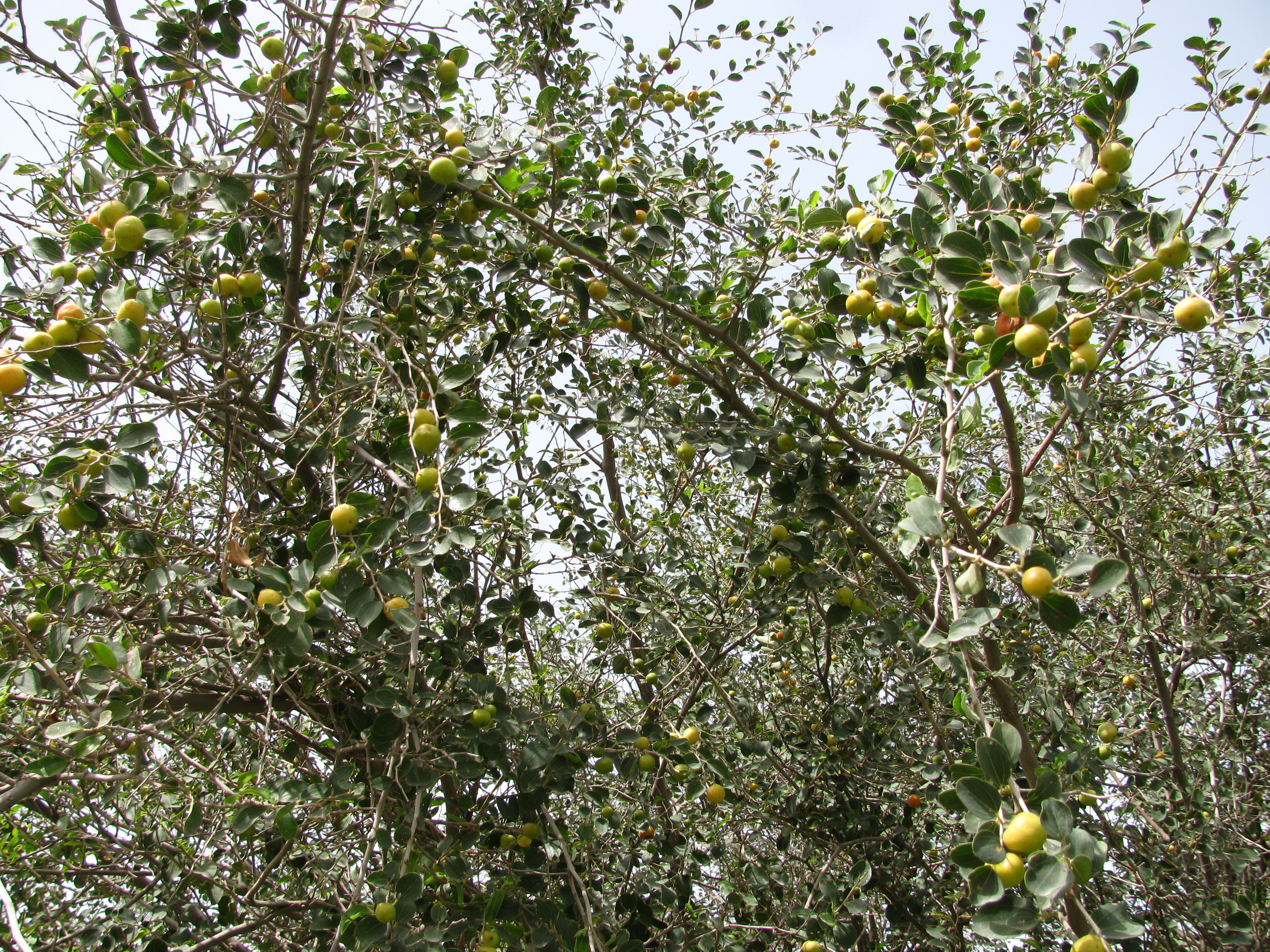

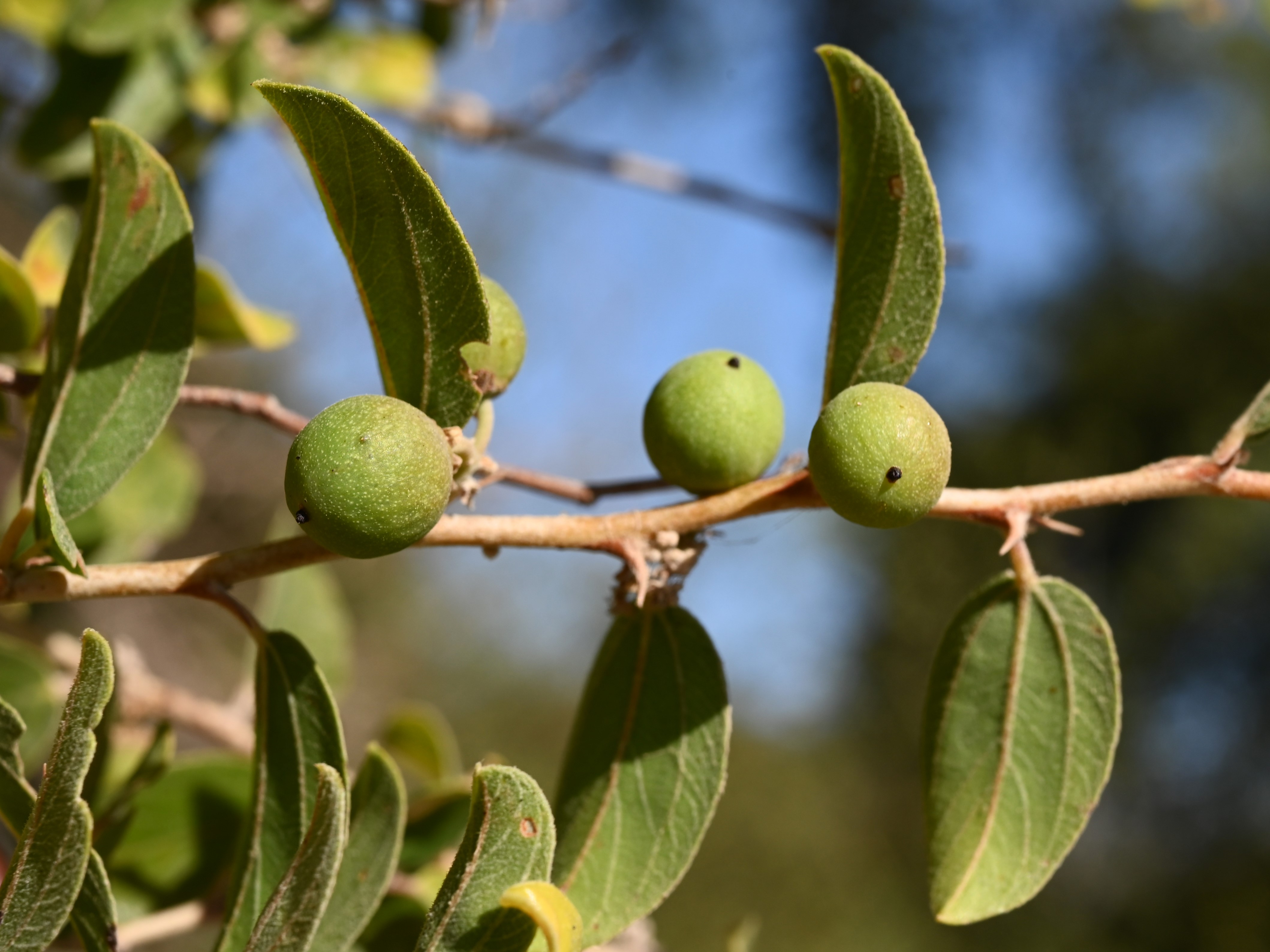

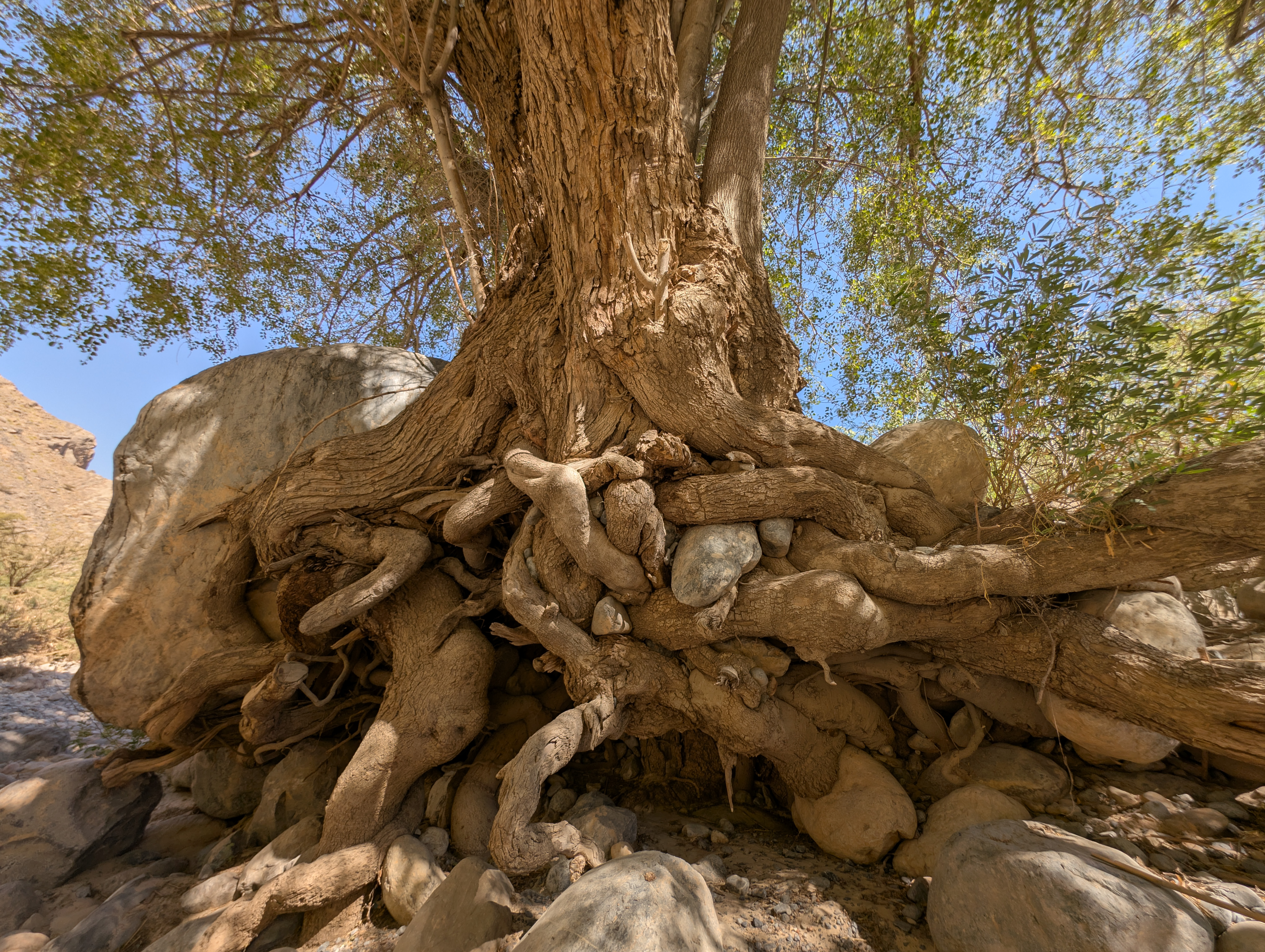

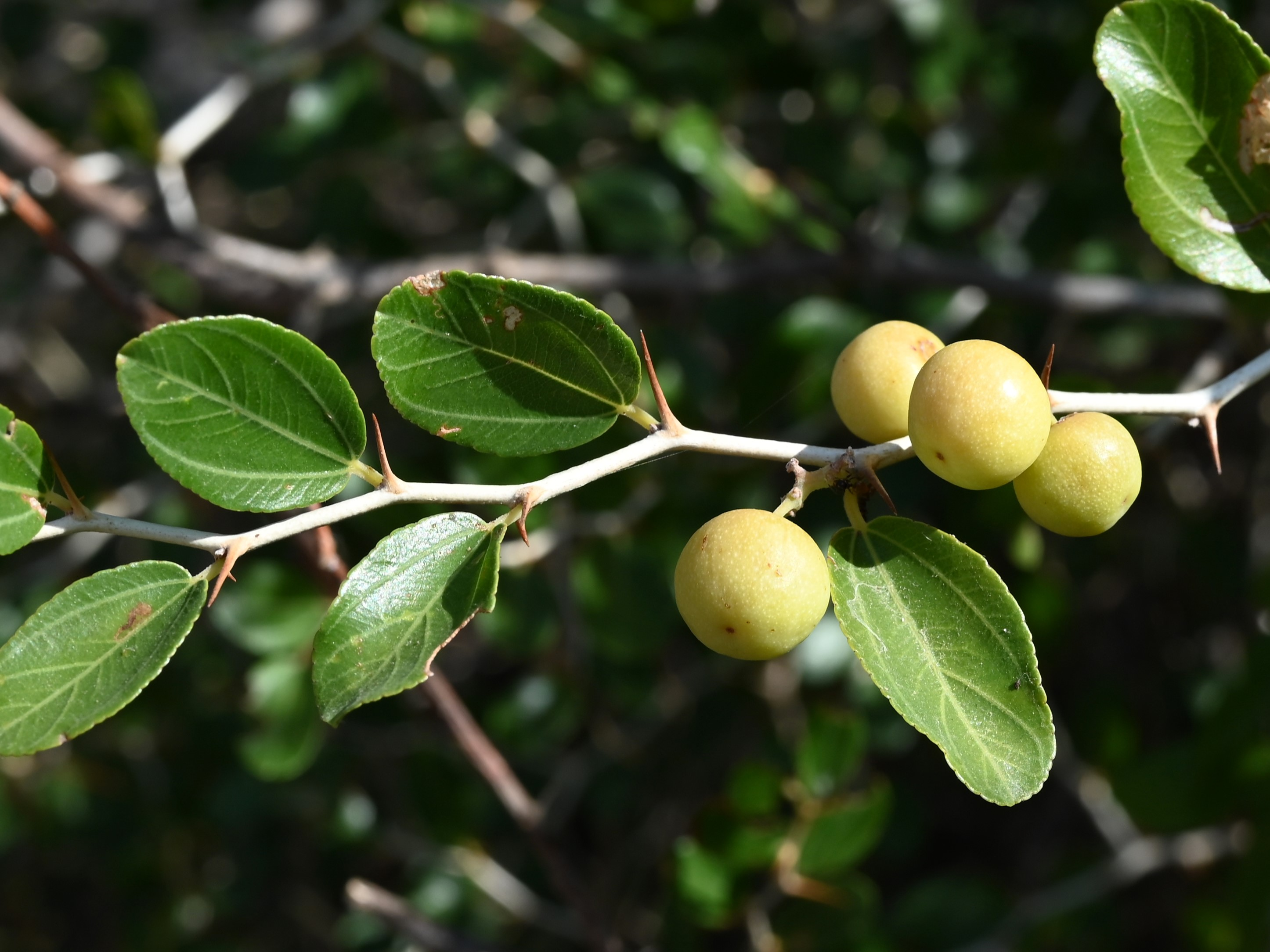

== Bibliography ==
- Easton, M.G. (1893). Illustrated Bible Dictionary and Treasury of Biblical History, Biography, Geography, Doctrine, and Literature: With Numerous Illustrations and Important Chronological Tables and Maps. London, Edinburgh and New York: T. Nelson and Sons.
- Ziziphus spina-christi in West African plants – A Photo Guide.
