= Altar =

Structure upon which offerings such as sacrifices are made for religious purposes

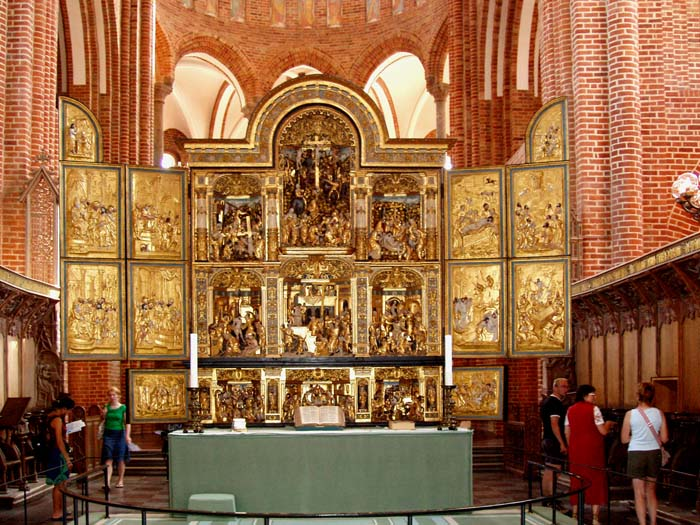
Altar in Roskilde Lutheran Cathedral beneath a carved reredos

An altar is a table or platform for the presentation of religious offerings, for sacrifices, or for other ritualistic purposes. Altars are found at shrines, temples, churches, and other places of worship. They are used particularly in Christianity, Buddhism, Hinduism, and modern paganism. Many historical-medieval faiths also made use of them, including the Roman, Greek, and Norse religions.

== Etymology ==
The modern English word altar was derived from Middle English altar, from Old English alter, taken from Latin altare ("altar"), probably related to adolere ("burn"); thus "burning place", influenced by altus ("high"). It displaced the native Old English word wēofod.

== Altars in antiquity ==
In antiquity, altars were used for making sacrifices to deities; this could include both libations and animal sacrifice.

In Ancient Roman religion, altars were often inscribed with the donor's name and the deity to whom the altar was dedicated. One of the most important surviving Roman altars is the Ara Pacis, dedicated by Augustus Caesar at the beginning of the Pax Romana to the goddess of peace, Pax.

Altars in antiquity

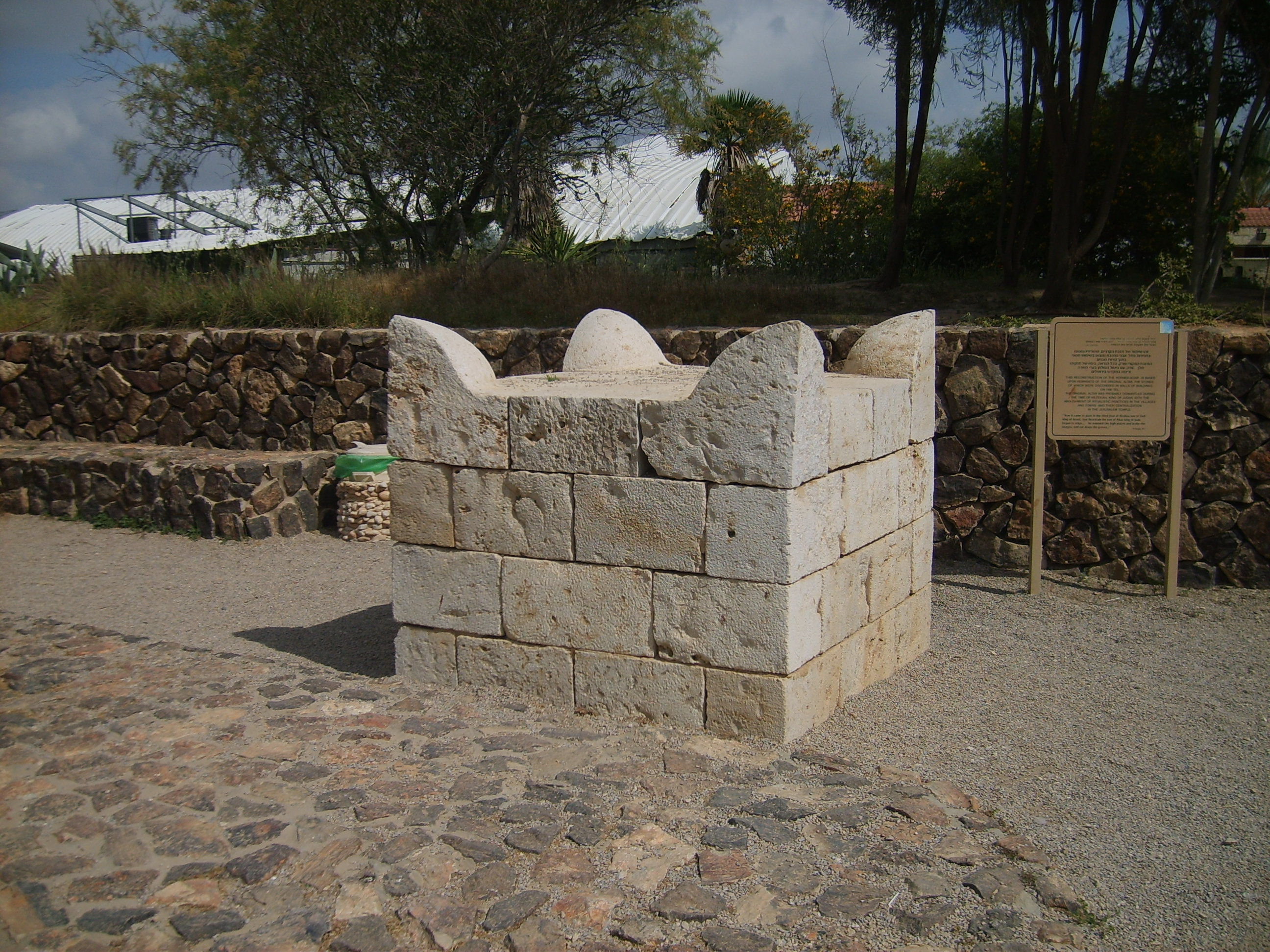
Reconstruction of a horned altar at Tel Be'er Sheva, Israel.

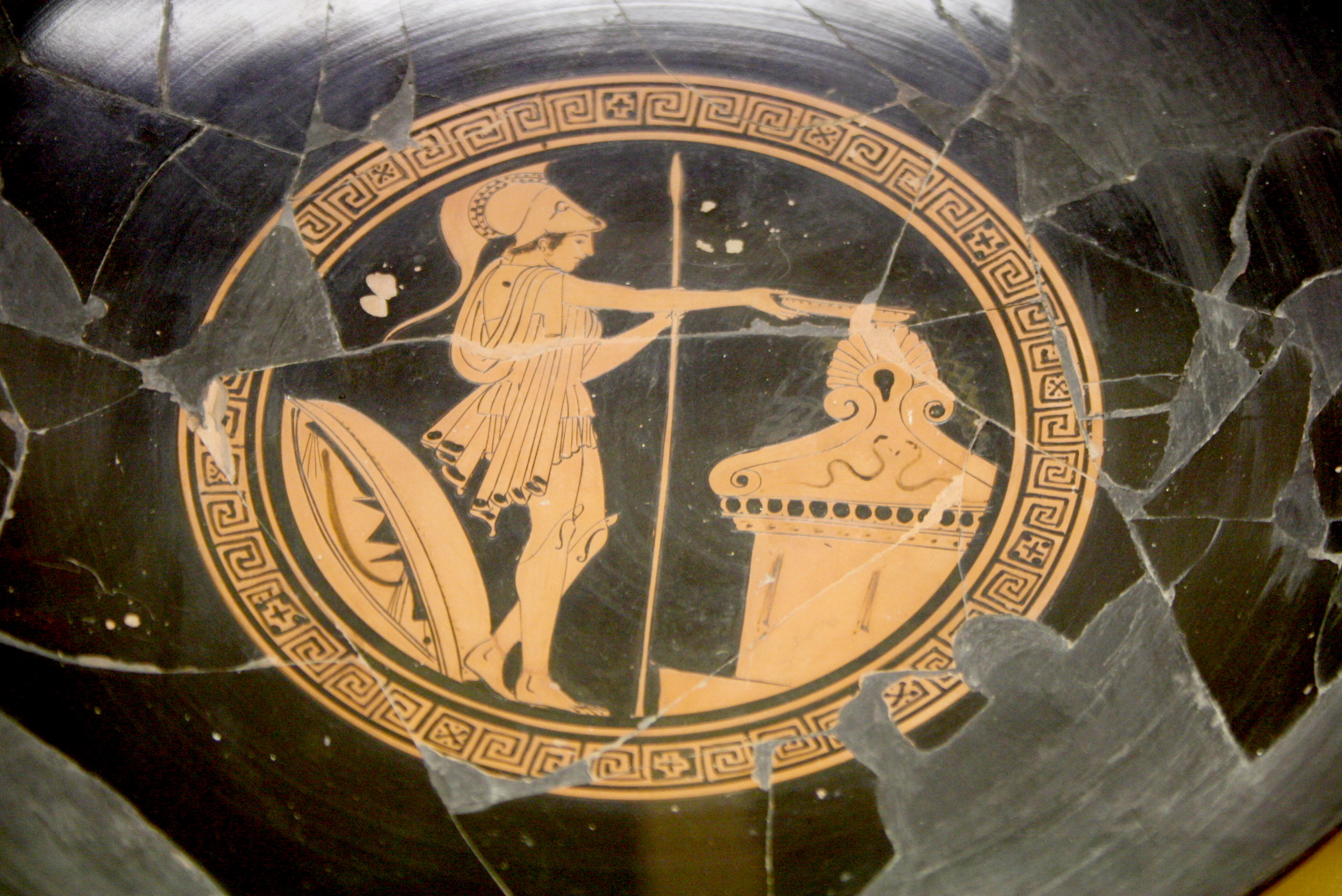
Ancient Greek kylix showing a hoplite offering a sacrifice before an altar, around 480 BC. Ancient Agora Museum of Athens in the Stoa of Attalus

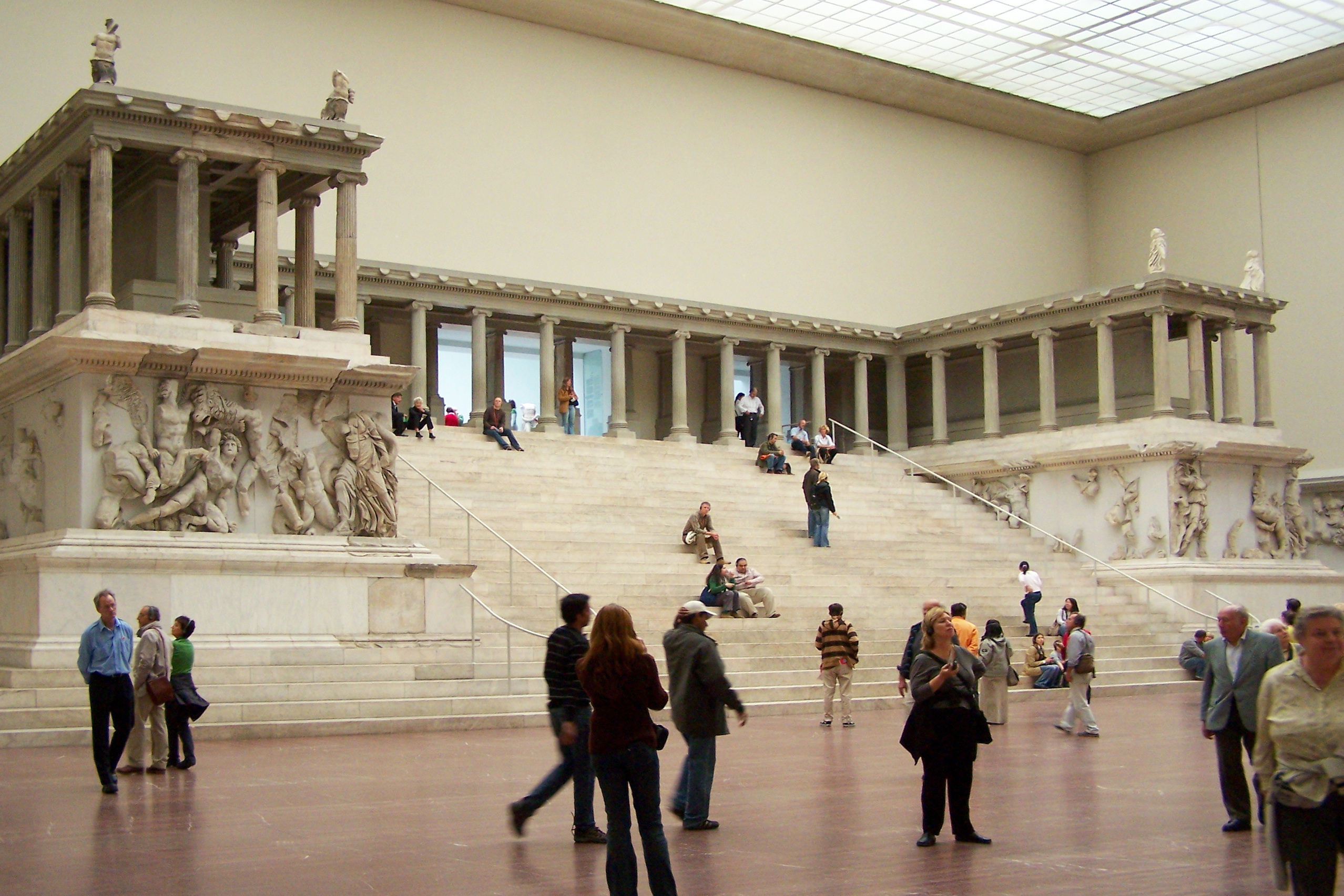
The ancient Altar of Pergamon, reconstructed at the Pergamon museum, Berlin.

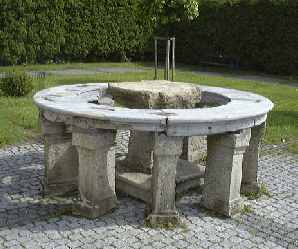
The Opferstein or Sacrifice Rock at Maria Taferl, Austria. It was used by the ancient Celts to make sacrifices upon and is now located in the plaza of the basilica there.

== Judaism ==
Altars (Note: Hebrew: מזבח, mizbe'ah means "a place of slaughter or sacrifice".) in the Hebrew Bible were typically made of earth or unwrought stone, but they could also be made of wood and even be portable, and were generally erected in conspicuous places. The first altar recorded in the Hebrew Bible is that erected by Noah after the flood. Later altars were erected by Abraham, by Isaac, by Jacob, and by Moses.

After the theophany on Mount Sinai, in the Tabernacle, and afterwards in the Temple, only two altars were used: the Altar of Burnt Offering, and the Altar of Incense, both near where the Ark of the Covenant was located.

The remains of three rock-hewn altars were discovered in the Land of Israel: one below Tel Zorah, another at the foot of Sebastia (ancient Samaria), and a third near Shiloh.

== Christianity ==
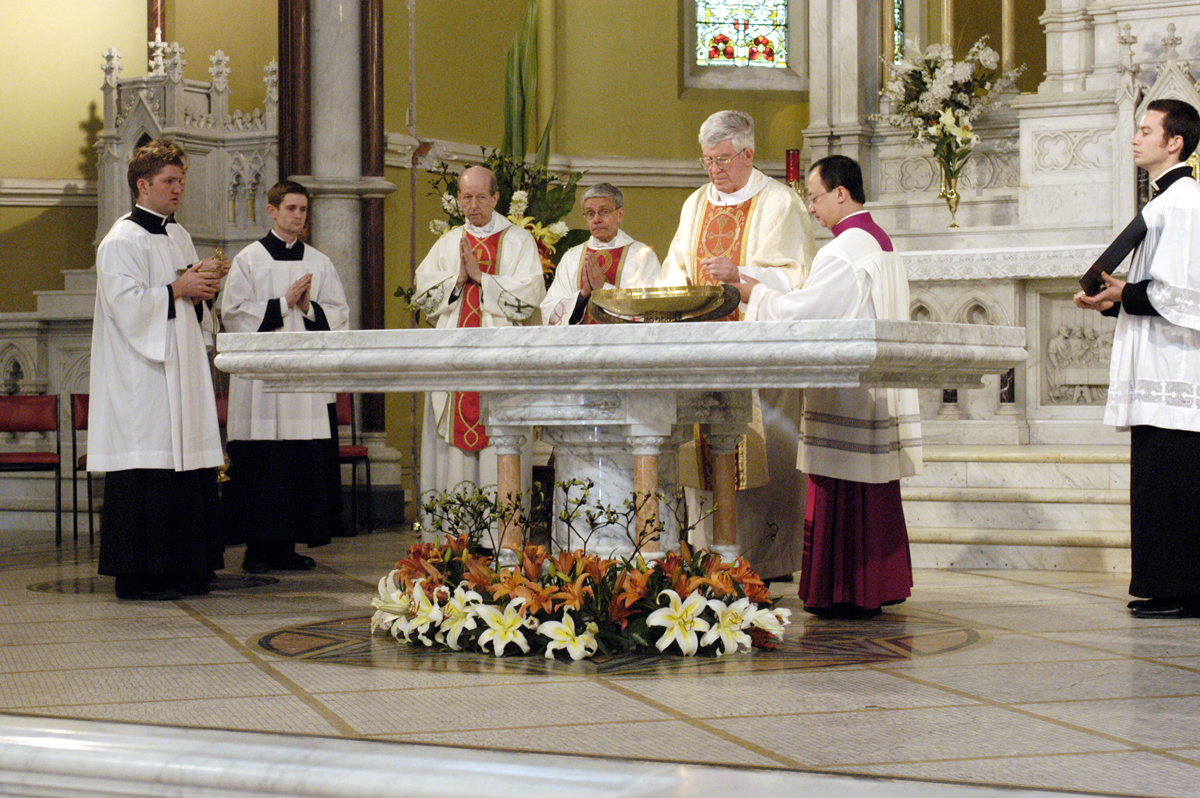
Dedication of an altar

The word altar, in Greek θυσιαστήριον (see:θυσία), appears twenty-four times in the New Testament. In Catholic and Orthodox Christian theology, the Eucharist is a re-presentation, in the literal sense of the one sacrifice of Christ on the cross being made "present again". Hence, the table upon which the Eucharist is consecrated is called an altar.

The altar plays a central role in the celebration of the Eucharist, which takes place at the altar on which the bread and the wine for consecration are placed. Altars occupy a prominent place in most Christian churches, both Eastern (Note: Here "eastern" means Eastern Orthodoxy, Oriental Orthodoxy, the Assyrian Church of the East, and the Ancient Church of the East; perhaps others.) and Western (Note: Here "western" means the Roman Catholic Church, Protestant churches (such as Anglicans, Lutherans, and some Reformed; perhaps others)) branches. Commonly among these churches, altars are placed for permanent use within designated places of communal worship (often called "sanctuaries"). Less often, though nonetheless notable, altars are set in spaces occupied less regularly, such as outdoors in nature, in cemeteries, in mausoleums/crypts, and family dwellings. Personal altars are those placed in a private bedroom, closet, or other space usually occupied by one person. They are used for practices of piety intended for one person (often referred to as a "private devotion"). They are also found in a minority of Protestant worship places; in Reformed and Anabaptist churches, a table, often called a "Communion table", serves an analogous function.

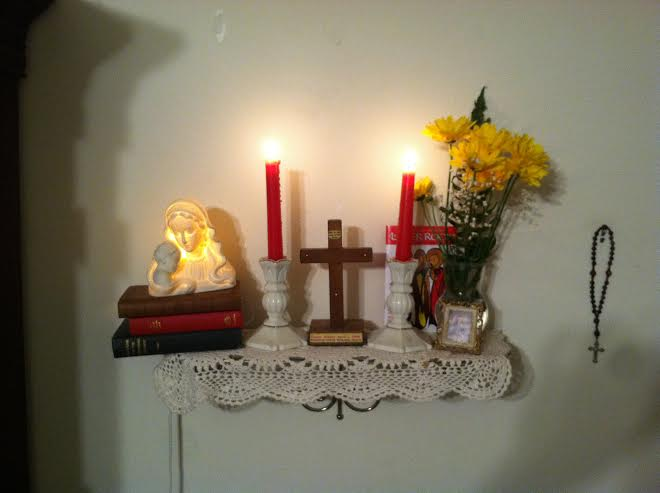
A home altar in a Christian household, with a cross and candles surrounded by other religious items

The area around the altar is seen as endowed with greater holiness, and is usually physically distinguished from the rest of the church, whether by a permanent structure such as an iconostasis, a rood screen, altar rails, a curtain that can be closed at more solemn moments of the liturgy (as in the Armenian Apostolic Church and Armenian Catholic Church), or simply by the general architectural layout. The altar is often on a higher elevation than the rest of the church.

Churches generally have a single altar, although in the Western branches of Christianity, as a result of the former abandonment of concelebration of Mass, so that priests always celebrated Mass individually, larger churches have had one or more side chapels, each with its own altar. The main altar was also referred to as the "high altar". Since the revival of concelebration in the West, the Roman Missal recommends that in new churches there should be only one altar, "which in the gathering of the faithful will signify the one Christ and the one Eucharist of the Church." This does not exclude altars in distinct side chapels, however, but only separate altars in the main body of the church. But most Western churches of an earlier period, whether Roman Catholic or Anglican, may have a high altar in the main body of the church, with one or more adjoining chapels, each with its own altar, at which the Eucharist may be celebrated on weekdays.

Architecturally, there are two types of altars: Those that are attached to the eastern wall of the chancel, and those that are free-standing and can be walked around, for instance when incensing the altar. (Note: When a free-standing altar is placed on the same floor-level as the congregation (in a cathedral, often at the "crossing") it is called a "low altar", particularly if the unused "high altar" is still in place, in the far end of the sanctuary.)

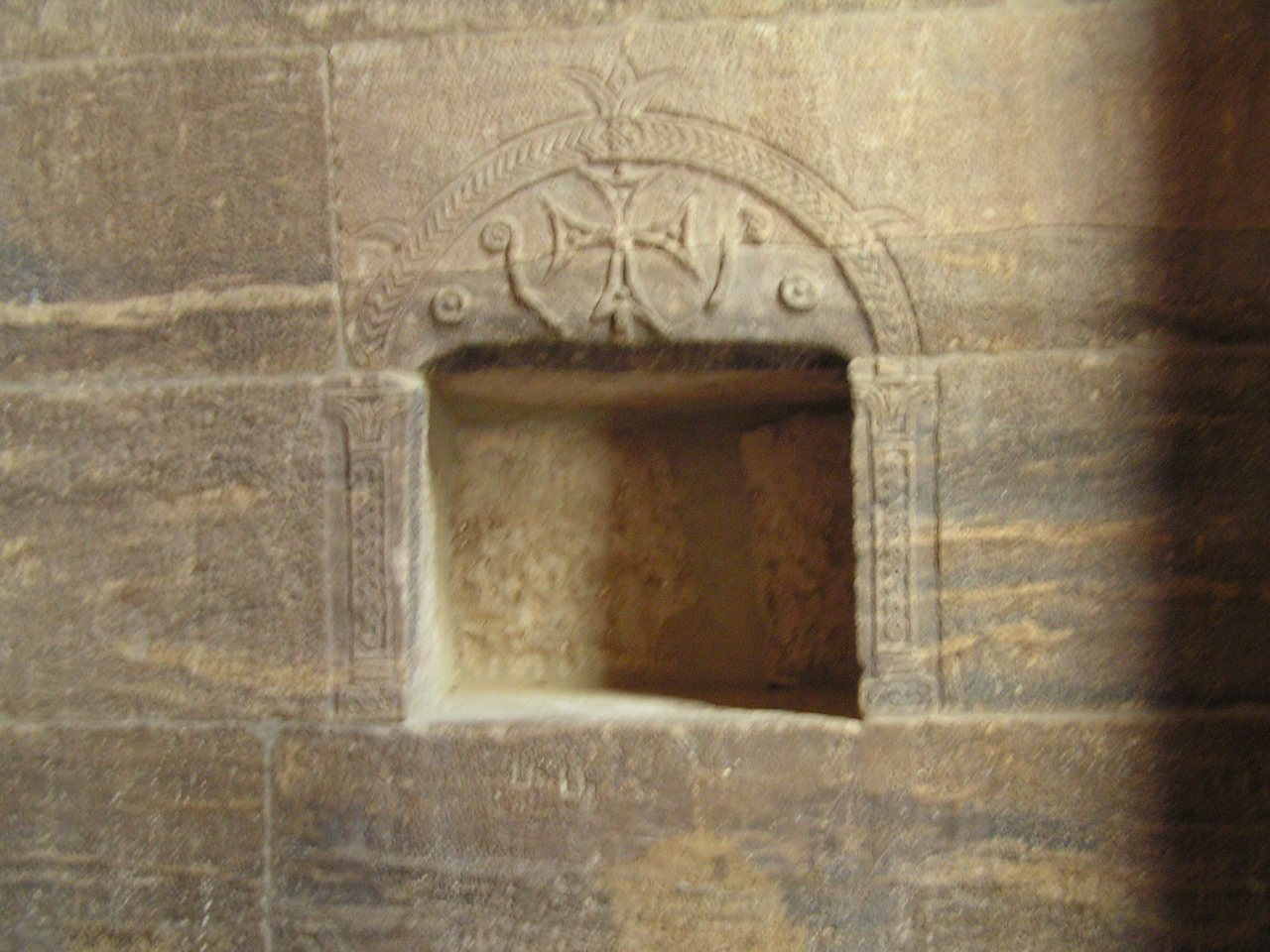
Early Coptic altar carved into the wall of the Temple of Isis on the island Philae in Egypt.

In the earliest days of the Church, the Eucharist appears to have been celebrated on portable altars set up for the purpose. Some historians hold that, during the persecutions, the Eucharist was celebrated among the tombs in the Catacombs of Rome, using the sarcophagi of martyrs as altars on which to celebrate. Other historians dispute this, but it is thought to be the origin of the tradition of placing relics beneath the altar.

When Christianity was legalized under Constantine the Great and Licinius, formal church buildings were built in great numbers, normally with free-standing altars in the middle of the sanctuary, which in all the earliest churches built in Rome was at the west end of the church. "When Christians in fourth-century Rome could first freely begin to build churches, they customarily located the sanctuary towards the west end of the building in imitation of the sanctuary of the Jerusalem Temple. Although in the days of the Jerusalem Temple the High Priest indeed faced east when sacrificing on Yom Kippur, the sanctuary within which he stood was located at the western end of the Temple. The Christian replication of the layout and the orientation of the Jerusalem Temple helped to dramatize the eschatological meaning attached to the sacrificial death of Jesus the High Priest in the Epistle to the Hebrews." The ministers (bishop, priests, deacons, subdeacons, acolytes), celebrated the Eucharist facing east, towards the entrance. Some hold that for the central part of the celebration the congregation faced the same way. After the sixth century the contrary orientation prevailed, with the entrance to the west and the altar at the east end. Then the ministers and congregation all faced east during the whole celebration; and in Western Europe altars began, in the Middle Ages, to be permanently placed against the east wall of the chancel.

=== In Western Christian churches ===
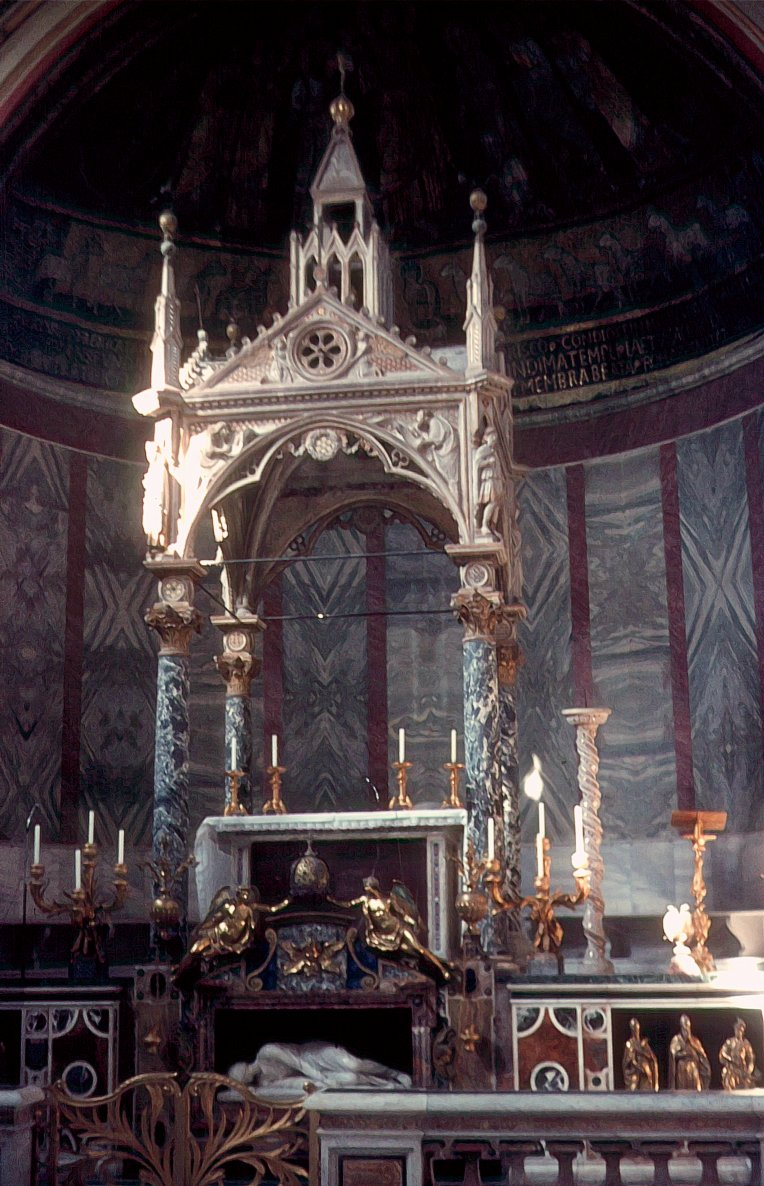
Altar of Santa Cecilia in Trastevere with ciborium

Most rubrics, even in books of the seventeenth century and later, such as the Pontificale Romanum, continued to envisage the altar as free-standing. The rite of the Dedication of the Church continued to presume that the officiating bishop could circle the altar during the consecration of the church and its altar. Despite this, with the increase in the size and importance of the reredos, most altars were built against the wall or barely separated from it.

In almost all cases, the eastward orientation for prayer was maintained, whether the altar was at the west end of the church, as in all the earliest churches in Rome, in which case the priest celebrating Mass faced the congregation and the church entrance, or whether it was at the east end of the church, in which case the priest faced the eastern apse and had his back to the congregation. This diversity was recognized in the rubrics of the Roman Missal from the 1604 typical edition of Pope Clement VIII to the 1962 edition of Pope John XXIII: "Si altare sit ad orientem, versus populum ..."

When placed close to a wall or touching it, altars were often surmounted by a reredos or altarpiece. If free-standing, they could be placed, as also in Eastern Christianity, within a ciborium (sometimes called a baldachin).

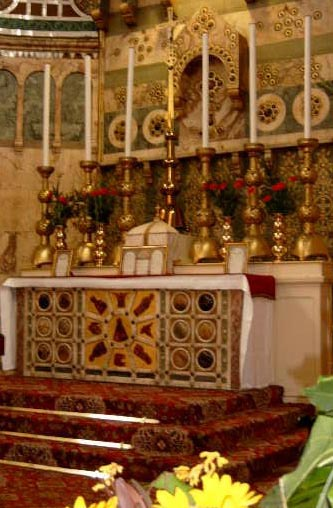
Altar of Newman University Church, Dublin, with an altar ledge occupying the only space between it and the wall

The rules regarding the present-day form of the Roman Rite liturgy declare a free-standing main altar to be "desirable wherever possible". Similarly, in the Anglican Communion, the rubrics of the Book of Common Prayer assumed an altar fixed against the wall, until Prayer Book revision in the twentieth century removed language which assumed any particular form of altar.

As well as altars in the structural sense, it became customary in the West to have what in Latin were referred to as altaria portatilia (portable altars), more commonly referred to in English as altar stones. When travelling, a priest could take one with him and place it on an ordinary table for saying Mass. They were also inserted into the centre of structural altars especially those made of wood. In that case, it was the altar stone that was considered liturgically to be the altar. The Pontificale Romanum contained a rite for blessing at the same time several of these altar stones. In the East the antimension served and continues to serve the same purpose.

The term movable altar or portable altar is now used of a full-scale structural altar, with or without an inserted altar stone, that can be moved.

Movable altars include the free-standing wooden tables without altar stone, placed in the choir away from the east wall, favoured by churches in the Reformed tradition. Altars that not only can be moved but are repeatedly moved are found in low church traditions that do not focus worship on the Eucharist, celebrating it rarely. Both Catholics and Protestants celebrate the Eucharist at such altars outside of churches and chapels, as outdoors or in an auditorium.

==== Catholic Church ====
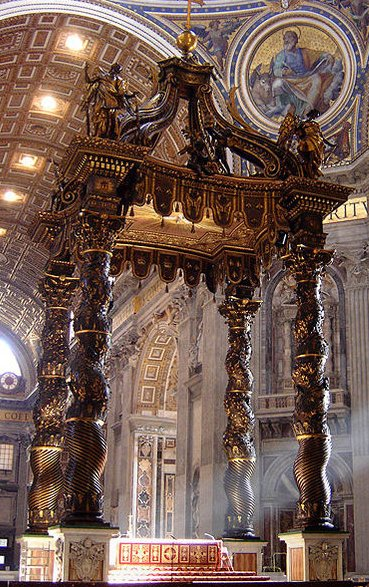
High altar of Saint Peter's Basilica, Rome

The Eastern Catholic Churches each follow their own traditions, which in general correspond to those of similar Eastern Orthodox or Oriental Orthodox Churches. All Christian Churches see the altar on which the Eucharist is offered as the "table of the Lord" (trapeza Kyriou) mentioned by Saint Paul. The rules indicated here are those of the Latin Church.

The Latin Church distinguishes between fixed altars (those attached to the floor) and movable altars (those that can be displaced), and states: "It is desirable that in every church there be a fixed altar, since this more clearly and permanently signifies Christ Jesus, the Living Stone. In other places set aside for sacred celebrations, the altar may be movable."

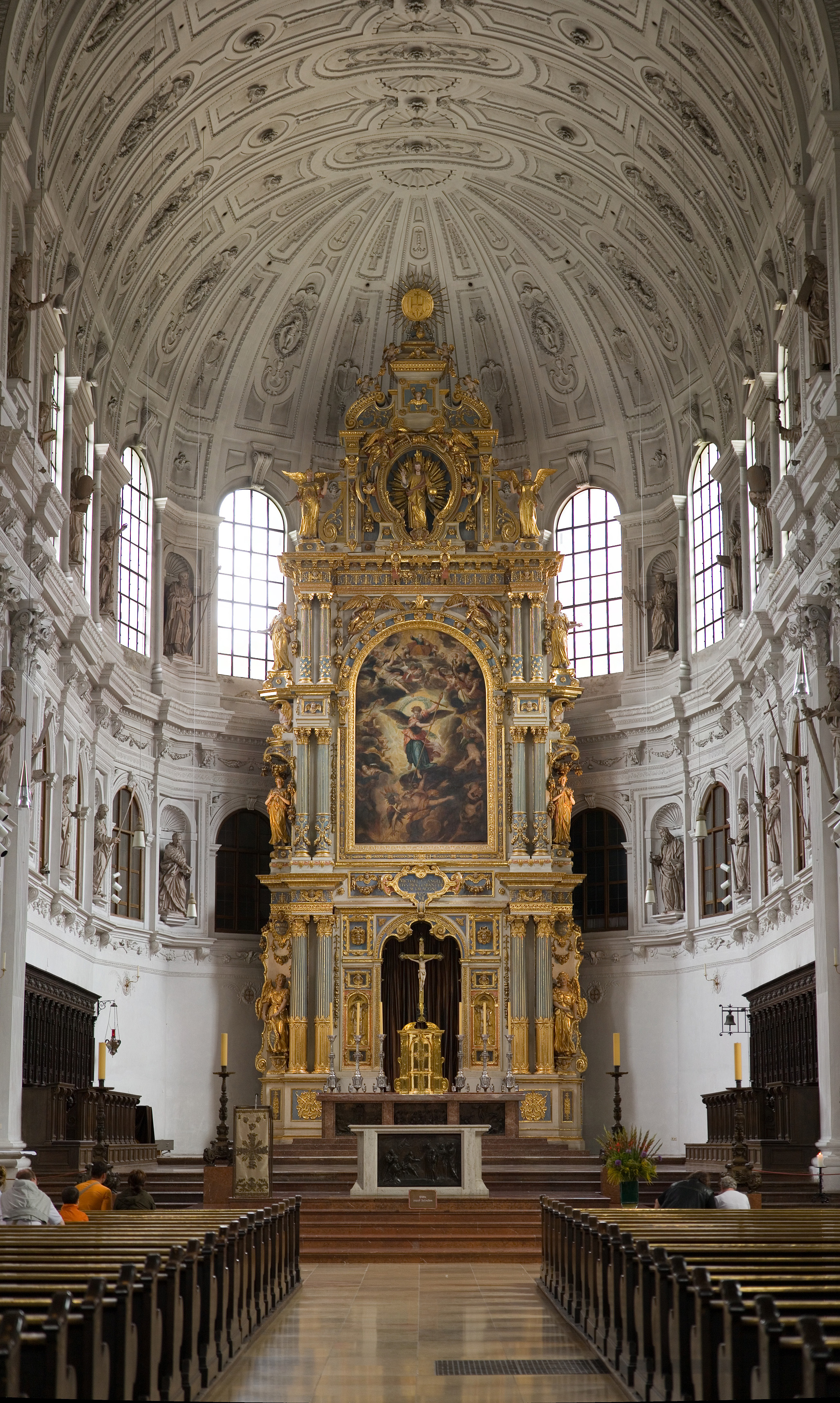
High altar of St. Michael's Church, Munich, dwarfed by a huge reredos

A fixed altar should in general be topped by a slab of natural stone, thus conforming to tradition and to the significance attributed to the altar, but in many places dignified, well-crafted solid wood is permitted; the supports or base of a fixed altar may be of any dignified solid material. A movable altar may be of any noble solid material suitable for liturgical use.

The liturgical norms state:

It is fitting that the tradition of the Roman liturgy should be preserved of placing relics of martyrs or other saints beneath the altar. However, the following should be noted:
(a) Relics intended for deposition should be large enough that they can be recognized as parts of human bodies. Hence excessively small relics of one or more saints must not be deposited.
(b) The greatest care must be taken to determine whether relics intended for deposition are authentic. It is better for an altar to be dedicated without relics than to have relics of doubtful credibility placed beneath it.
(c) A reliquary must not be placed on the altar, or in the table of the altar; it must be beneath the table of the altar, as the design of the altar may allow. (Note: Rite of Dedication of a Church and an Altar. Chapter II, 5. The Code of Canon Law (Report). canon 1237, §2. and)

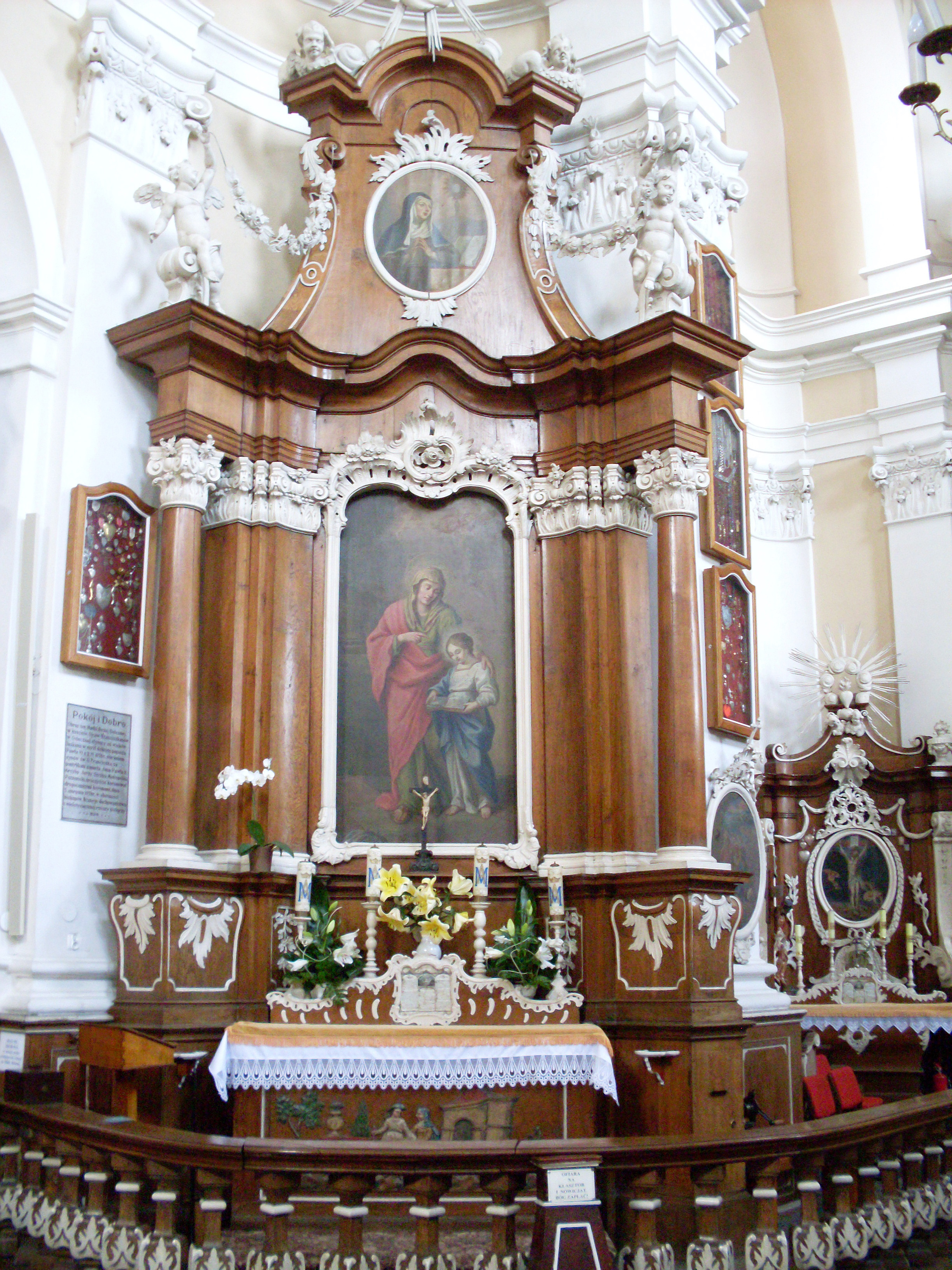
St. Valentine's Church the altar of Our Lady of Sorrows and Child in Osieczna, Poland

This last norm explicitly excludes the practice customary in recent centuries of inserting relics into a specially created cavity within the table of an altar or altar stone. Placing of relics even in the base of a movable altar is also excluded.

"In building new churches, it is preferable for a single altar to be erected, one that in the gathering of the faithful will signify the one Christ and the one Eucharist of the Church. In already existing churches, however, when the old altar is so positioned that it makes the people's participation difficult but cannot be moved without damage to artistic value, another fixed altar, skillfully made and properly dedicated, should be erected and the sacred rites celebrated on it alone. In order that the attention of the faithful not be distracted from the new altar the old altar should not be decorated in any special way." The altar, fixed or movable, should as a rule be separate from the wall so as to make it easy to walk around it and to celebrate Mass at it facing the people. It should be positioned so as to be the natural centre of attention of the whole congregation.

The altar should be covered by at least one white cloth, and nothing else should be placed upon the altar table other than what is required for the liturgical celebration. Candlesticks and a crucifix, when required, can be either on the altar or near it, and it is desirable that the crucifix remain even outside of liturgical celebrations.

==== Protestant churches ====
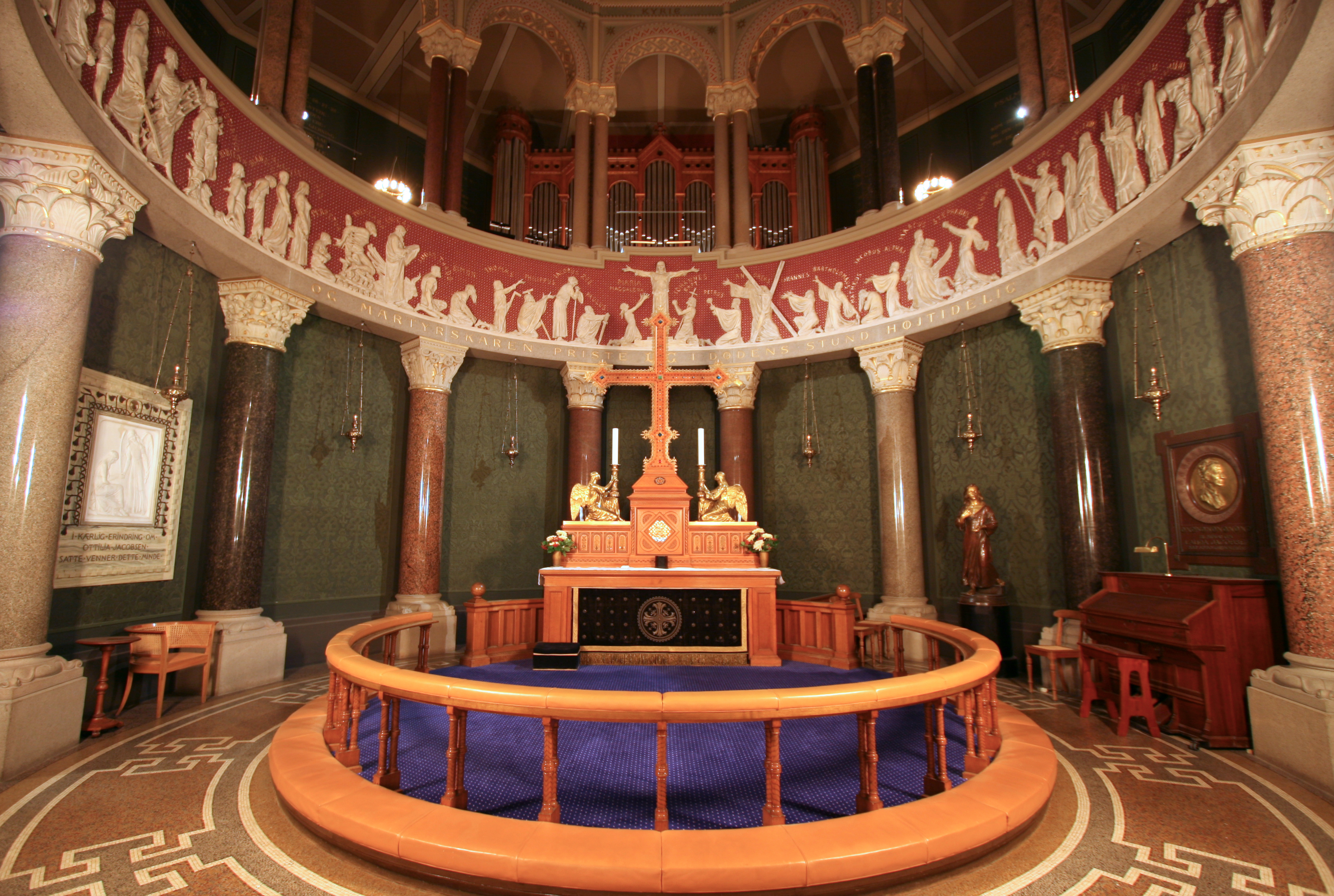
Altar at the Lutheran Jesus Church in Valby, Copenhagen.

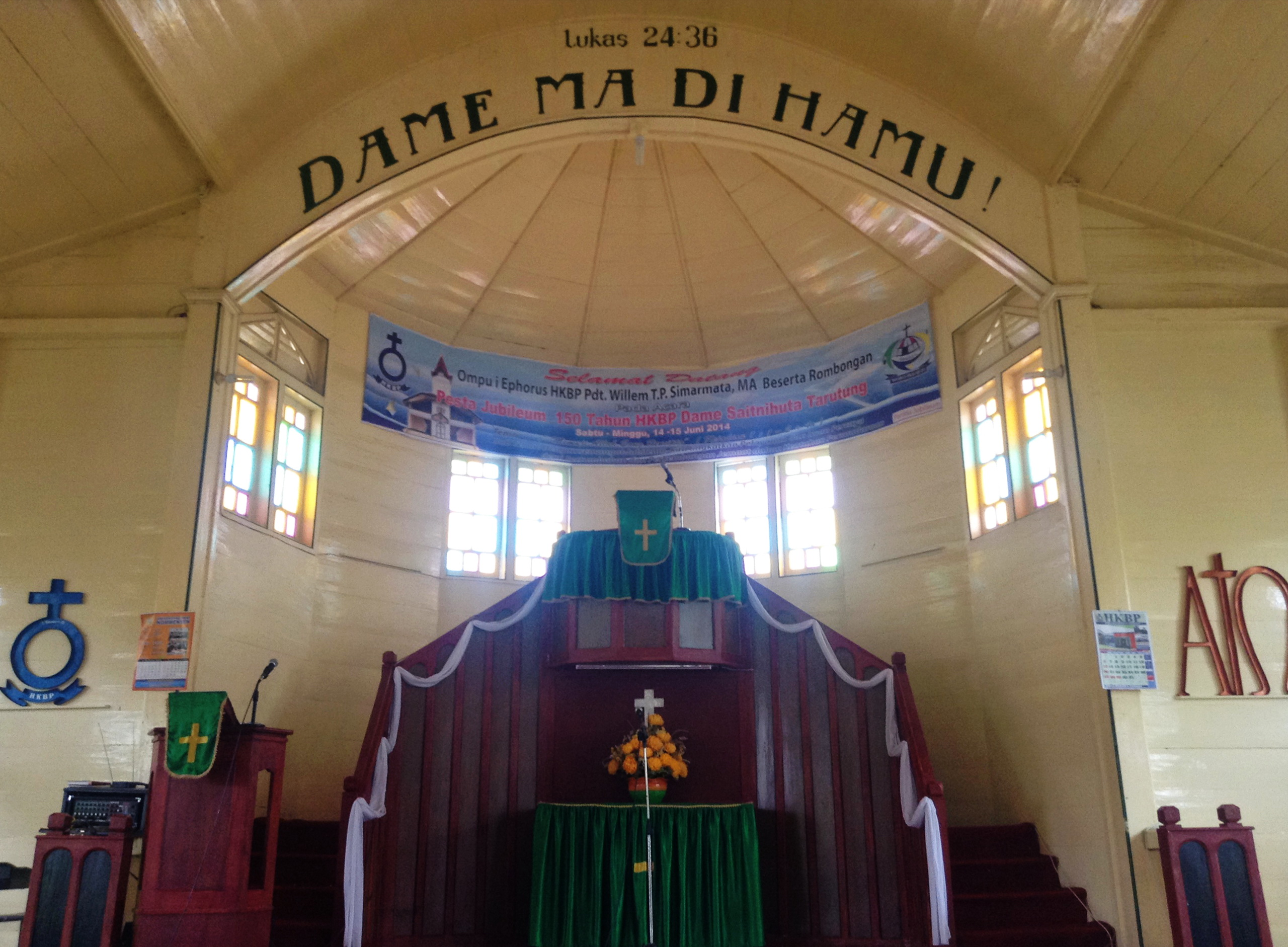
An altar located in the middle of the pulpit, namely the Batak Christian Protestant Church, one of the Lutheran churches in Indonesia located in Tarutung, North Sumatra.

A wide variety of altars exist in various Protestant denominations. Some Churches, such as the Lutheran, have altars very similar to Anglican or Catholic ones keeping with their more sacramental understanding of the Lord's Supper. Calvinist churches from Reformed, Baptist, Congregational, and Non-denominational backgrounds instead have a Communion Table adorned with a linen cloth, as well as an open Bible and a pair of candlesticks; it is not referred to as an altar because they do not see Holy Communion as sacrificial in any way. Such a table may be temporary: Moved into place only when there is a Communion Service. Some nondenominational churches have no altar or communion table, even if they retain the practice of the "altar call" that originated in the Methodist Church.

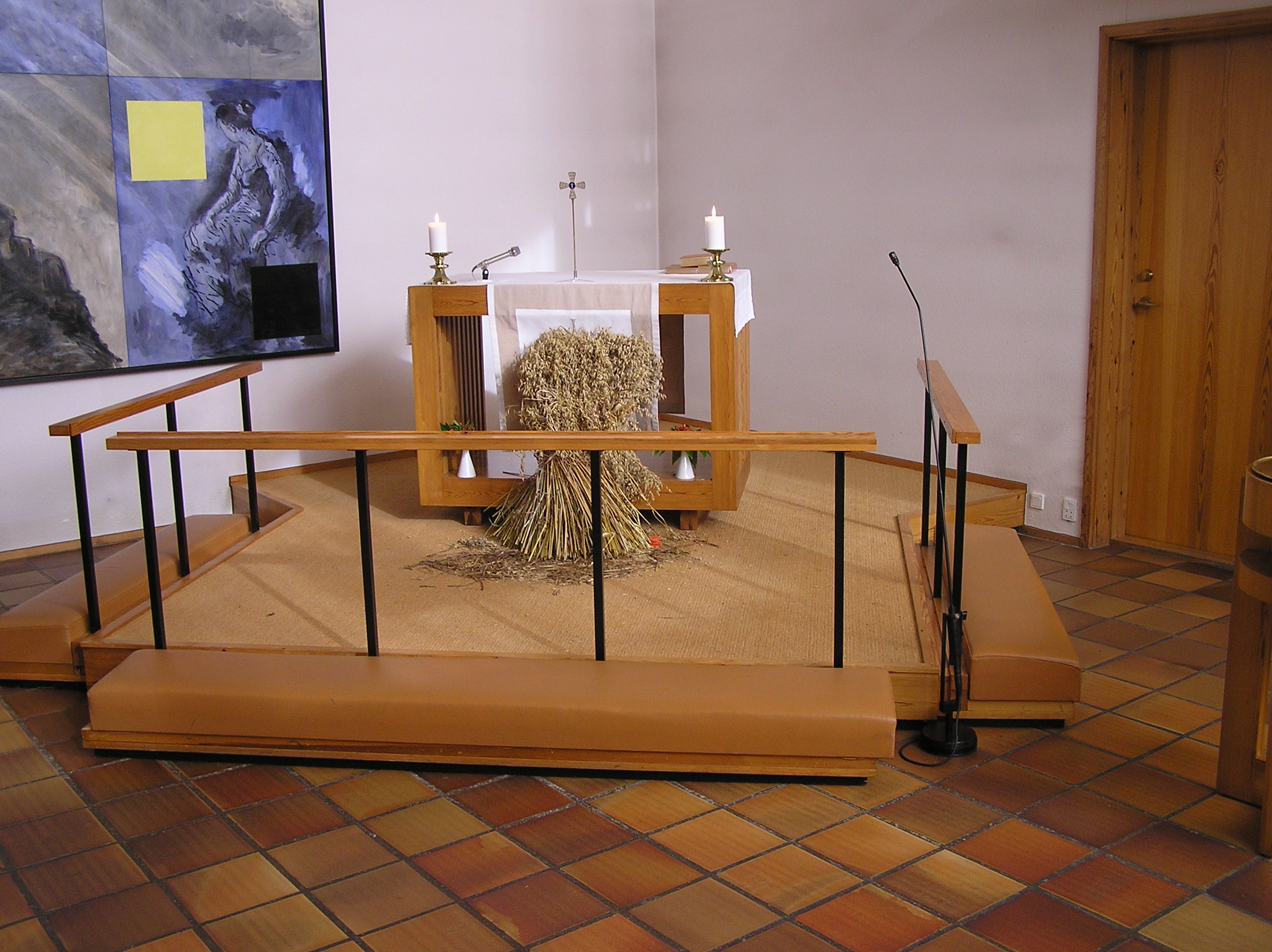
Contemporary altar at the Lutheran Bavnehøj Kirke.

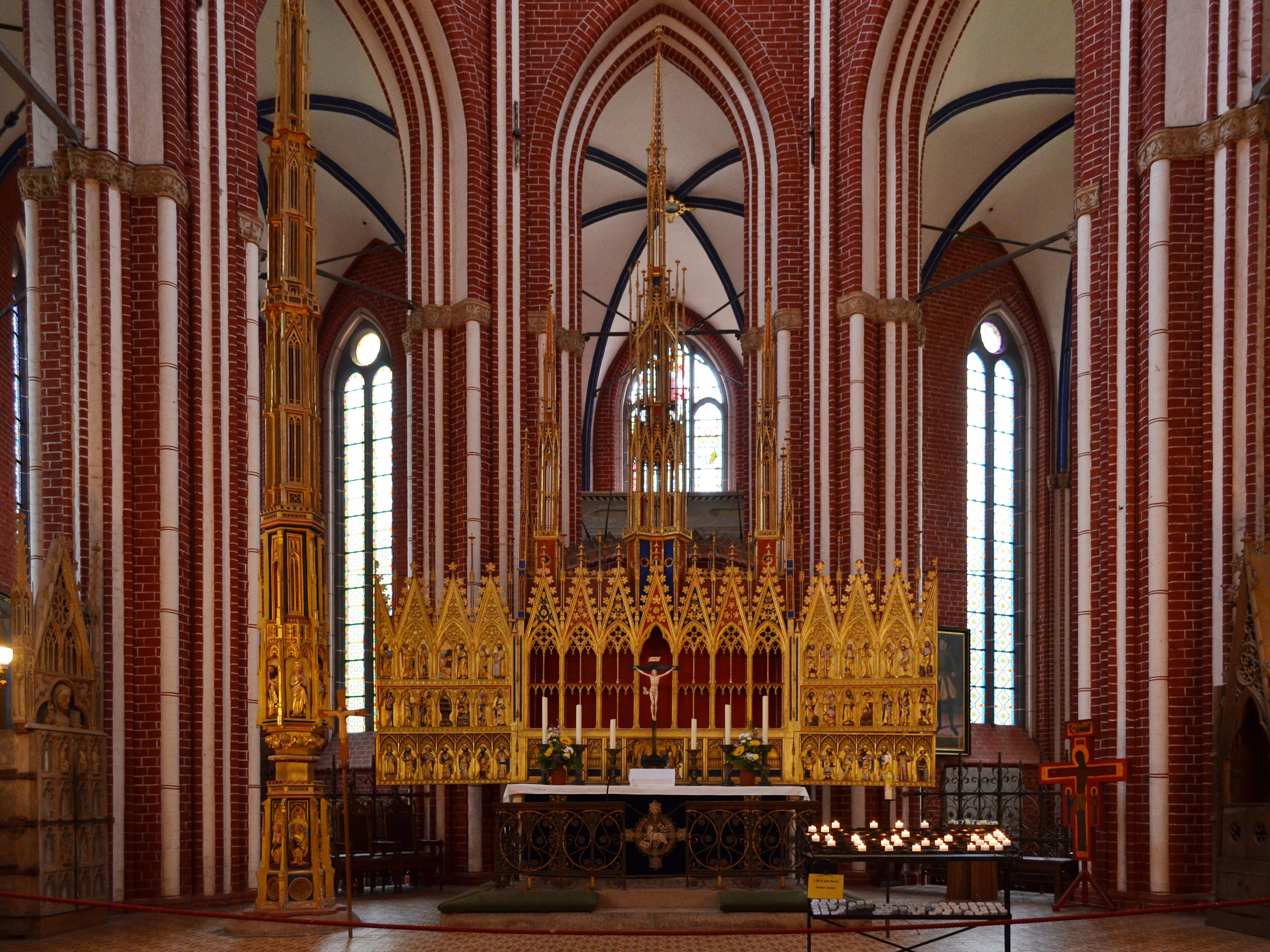
The Lutheran altar in Bad Doberan Minster

Some Methodist and other evangelical churches practice what is referred to as an altar call, whereby those who wish to make a new spiritual commitment to Jesus Christ are invited to come forward publicly. (Note: The "come forward" invitation is a method that's only about 180 years old. It was invented by Methodist churches in the late 17th century and later picked up and popularized by Charles Finney in the mid-1800s — and the majority of evangelical churches use that form today.) It is so named because the supplicants, at the end of the sermon, kneel at the altar rails, which are located around the altar within chancel. (Note: Every Methodist church has an altar rail below the pulpit platform where penitent folk can kneel and pray if they desire to seek divine help.) Those that come forward will often recite a sinner's prayer, which, in evangelical understanding, if truly heart-felt indicates that they are now "saved". They may also be offered religious literature, counselling or other assistance. Many times it is said that those who come forth are going to "be saved". This is a ritual in which the supplicant makes a prayer of penitence (asking for his sins to be forgiven) and faith (called in evangelical Christianity "accepting Jesus Christ as their personal Lord and Saviour").

===== Lutheran churches =====
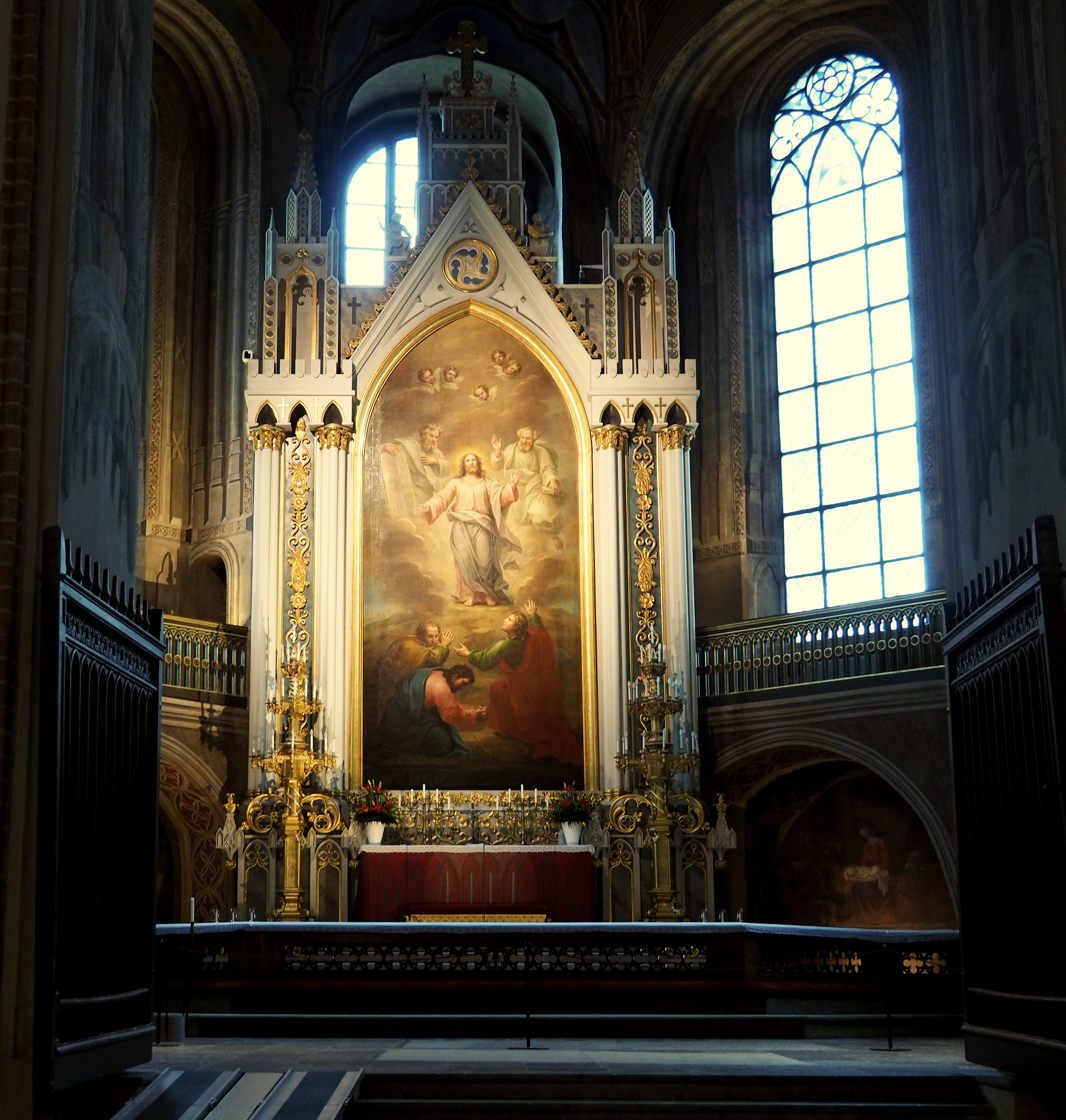
Altar of Turku Cathedral

Altars in Lutheran churches are often similar to those in Roman Catholic and Anglican churches. Lutherans believe that the altar represents Christ and should only be used to consecrate and distribute the Eucharist. Lutheran altars are commonly made out of granite, but other materials are also used. A crucifix is to be put above the altar. Sometimes relics are also placed around the altar.

===== Anglican churches =====
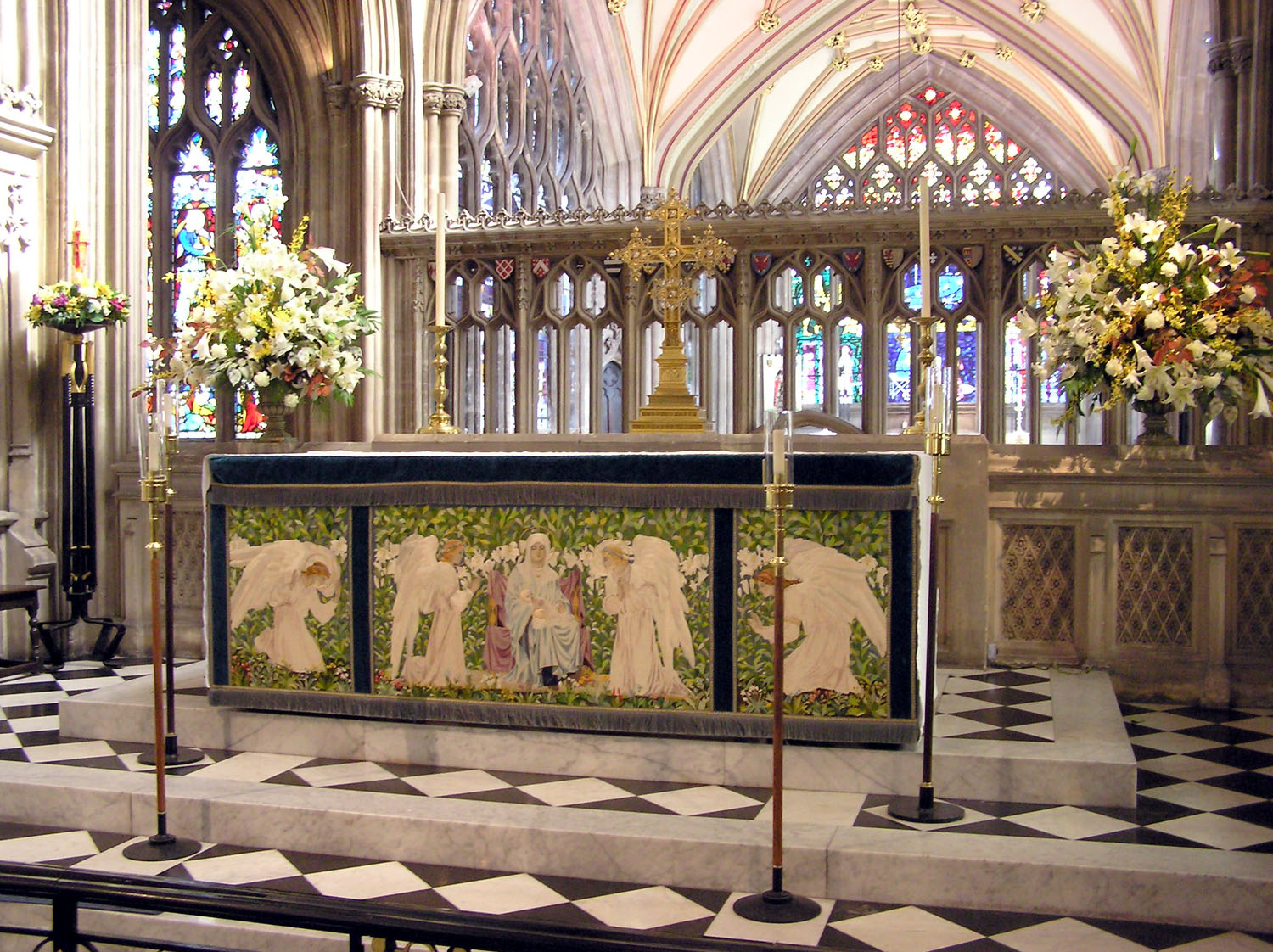
The altar in St. Mary Anglican Church, Redcliffe, Bristol. It is decorated with a frontal in green, a colour typically associated with the seasons after Epiphany and Pentecost. Note the reredos behind the free-standing altar.

Altars in the Anglican Communion vary widely. In the Book of Common Prayer, the basis of doctrine and practice for the Church of England, there is no use of the specific word altar; the item in question is called the Lord's Table or Holy Table. This remains the official terminology, though common usage may call the communion table an altar.

At the time of the Reformation, altars were fixed against the east end of the church, and the priests would celebrate the Mass standing at the front of the altar. Beginning with the rubrics of the Second Prayer Book of Edward VI published in 1552, and through the 1662 Book of Common Prayer (which prevailed for almost 300 years and is still in occasional use), the priest is directed to stand "at the north syde of the Table". This was variously interpreted over the years to mean the north side of the front of a fixed communion table, the north end of a fixed table (i.e., facing south), the north side of a free-standing table (presumably facing those intending to receive the Elements who would be sitting in the quire stalls opposite), or at the north end of a free-standing table lengthwise in the chancel, facing a congregation seated in the nave.

Often, where a celebrant chose to situate himself was meant to convey his churchmanship (that is, more Reformed or more Catholic). The use of candles or tabernacles was banned by canon law, with the only appointed adornment being a white linen cloth.

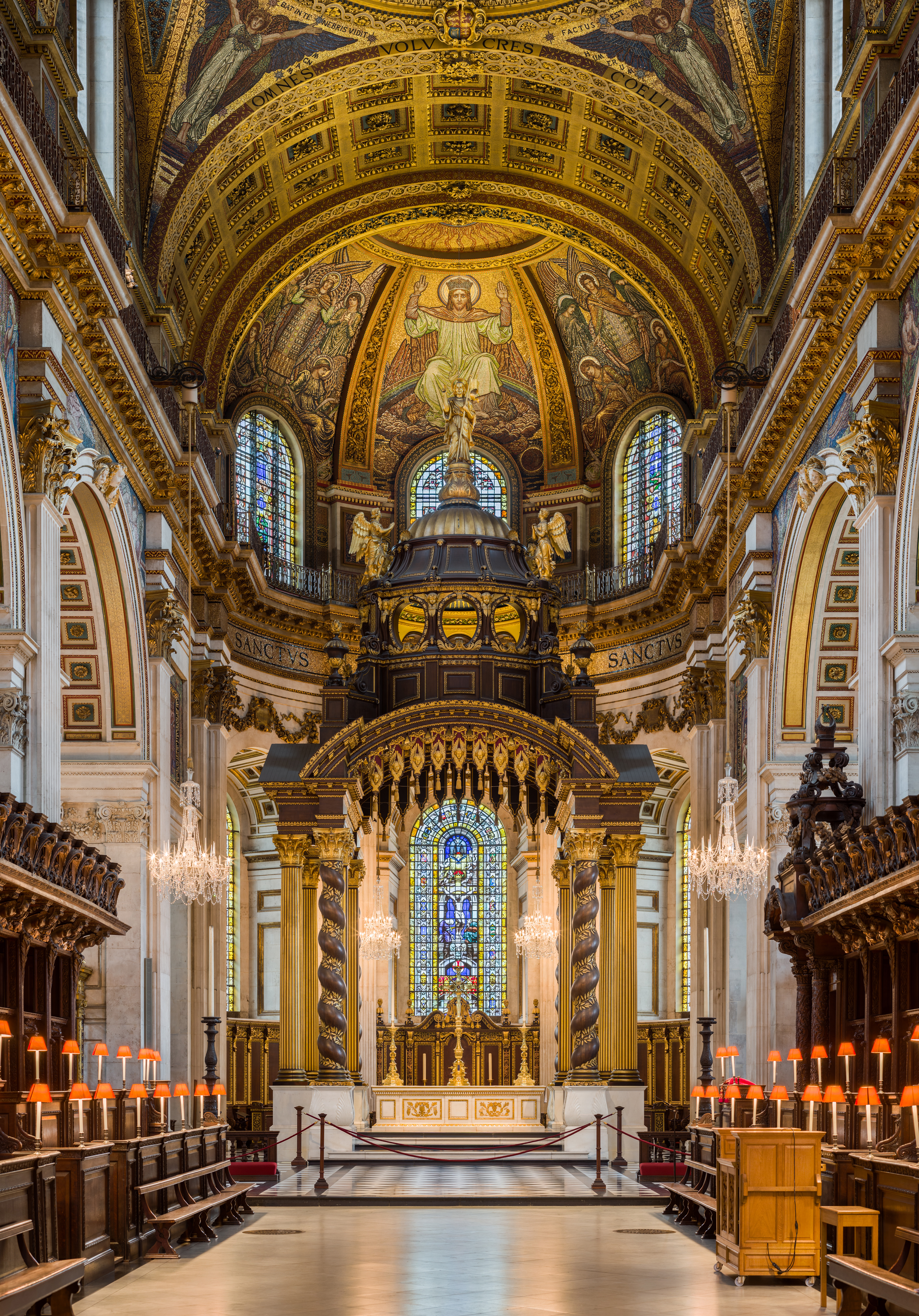
High altar of St Paul's Cathedral, London

Beginning with the Oxford Movement in the 19th century, the appearance of Anglican altars took a dramatic turn in many churches. Candles and, in some cases, tabernacles were re‑introduced. In some churches two candles, on each end of the altar, were used; in other cases six—three on either side of a tabernacle, typically surmounted by a crucifix or some other image of Christ. When a stone altar was placed in the Church of the Holy Sepulchre, Cambridge after rebuilding works in 1841, a case was brought in the Court of Arches which resulted in an order to remove it and replace it with a wooden communion table.

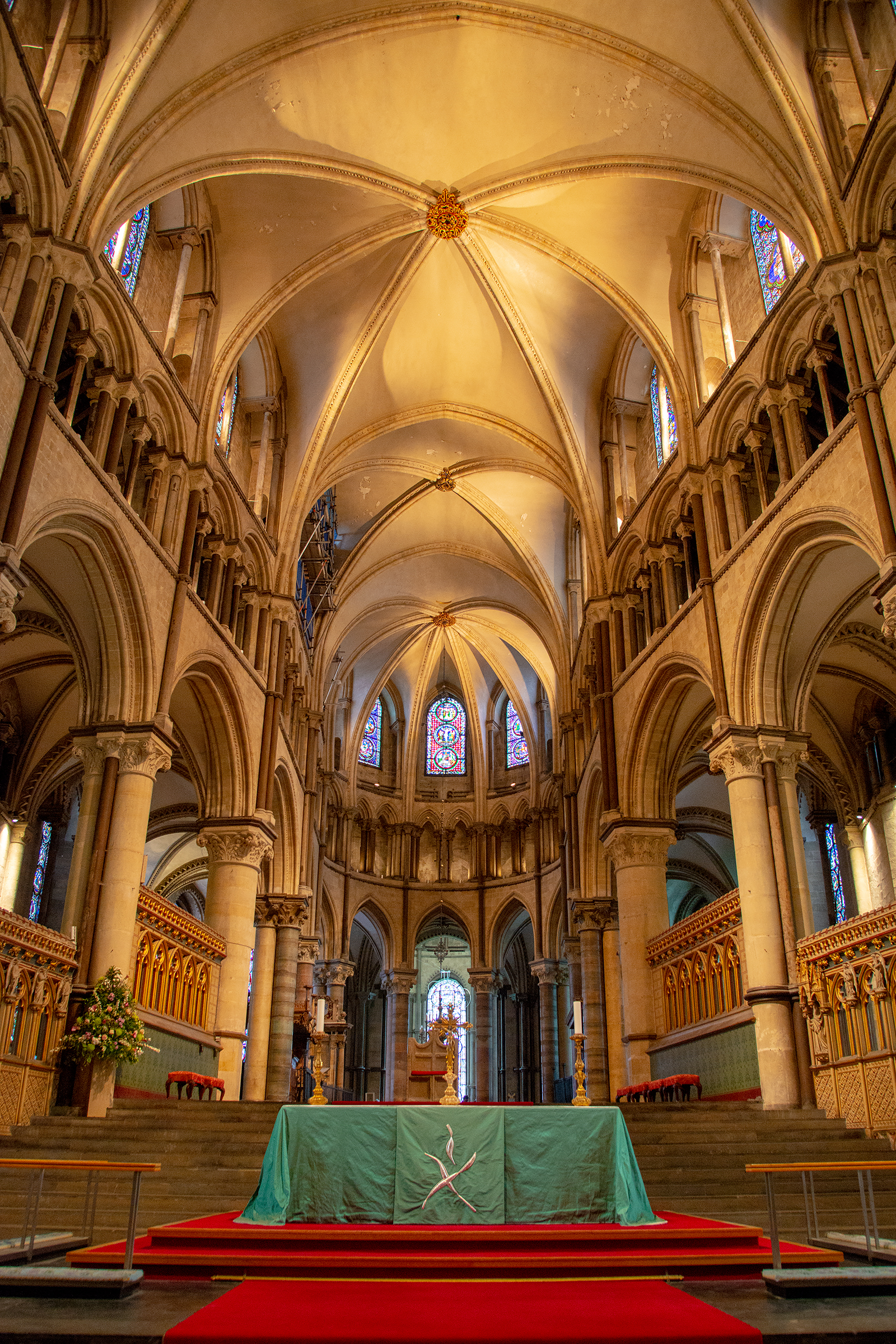
The "low" altar area at Canterbury Cathedral (Note: The "high" altar is out of sight in the background, beneath the window. When the low altar is in use, the high altar in the back is not used, and stands "undressed".)

In Anglican practice, conformity to a given standard depends on the ecclesiastical province and/or the liturgical sensibilities of a given parish. In the Parson's Handbook, an influential manual for priests popular in the early-to-mid-twentieth century, Percy Dearmer recommends that "All altars should be 3 ft. 3 in. high, and at least deep enough to take a corporal [the square of linen placed underneath the Communion vessels] 20 in. square, with an inch or two to spare." He also recommends that the altar stand upon three steps for each of the three sacred ministers, and that it be decorated with a silk frontal in the seasonal colour. In some cases, other manuals suggest that a stone be set in the top of wooden altars, in the belief that the custom be maintained of consecrating the bread and wine on a stone surface. In many other Anglican parishes, the custom is considerably less rigorous, especially in those parishes which use free-standing altars. Typically, these altars are made of wood, and may or may not have a solid front, which may or may not be ornamented. In many Anglican parishes, the use of frontals has persisted.

When altars are placed away from the wall of the chancel allowing a westward orientation, only two candles are placed on either end of it, since six would obscure the liturgical action, undermining the intent of a westward orientation (i.e., that it be visible to the congregation). In such an arrangement, a tabernacle may stand to one side of or behind the altar, or an aumbry may be used.

Sensibilities concerning the sanctity of the altar are widespread in Anglicanism. In some parishes, the notion that the surface of the altar should only be touched by those in holy orders is maintained. In others, there is considerably less strictness about the communion table. Nonetheless, the continued popularity of communion rails in Anglican church construction suggests that a sense of the sanctity of the altar and its surrounding area persists. In most cases, moreover, the practice of allowing only those items that have been blessed to be placed on the altar is maintained (that is, the linen cloth, candles, missal, and the Eucharistic vessels).

Anglican churches

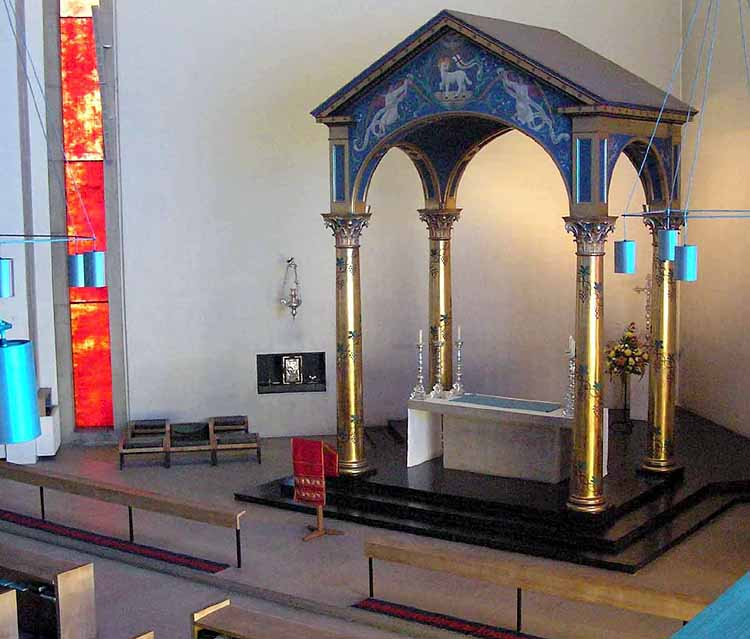
The altar with ciborium at All Saints Anglican church, Bristol, England

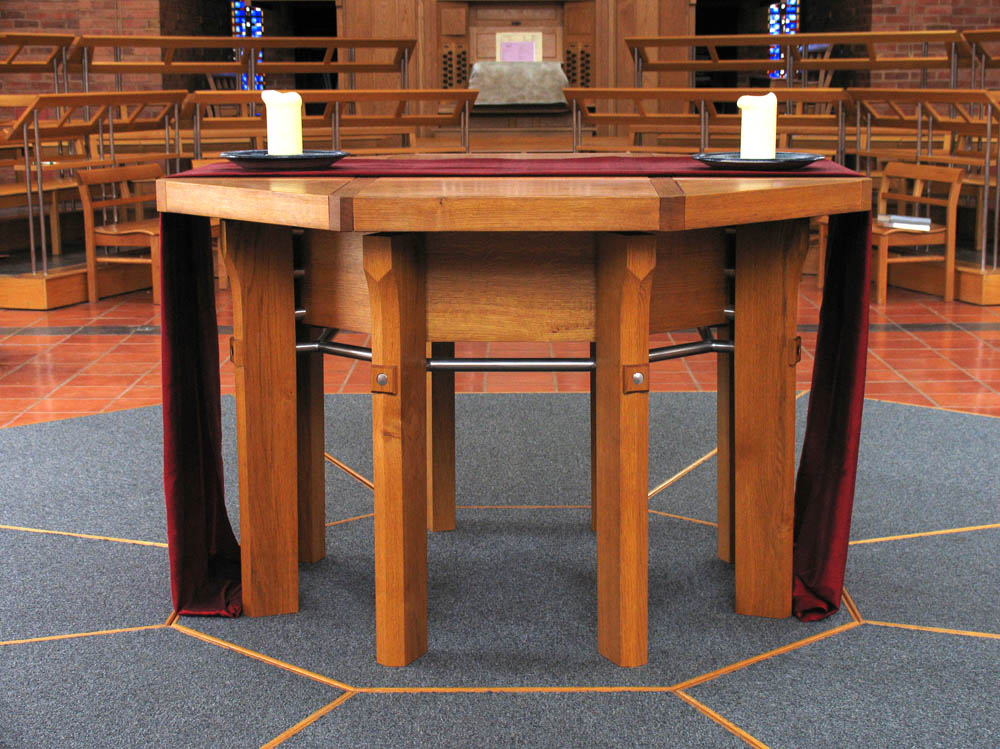
The Lord's Table in St Barnabas' Church, Dulwich (Diocese of Southwark)

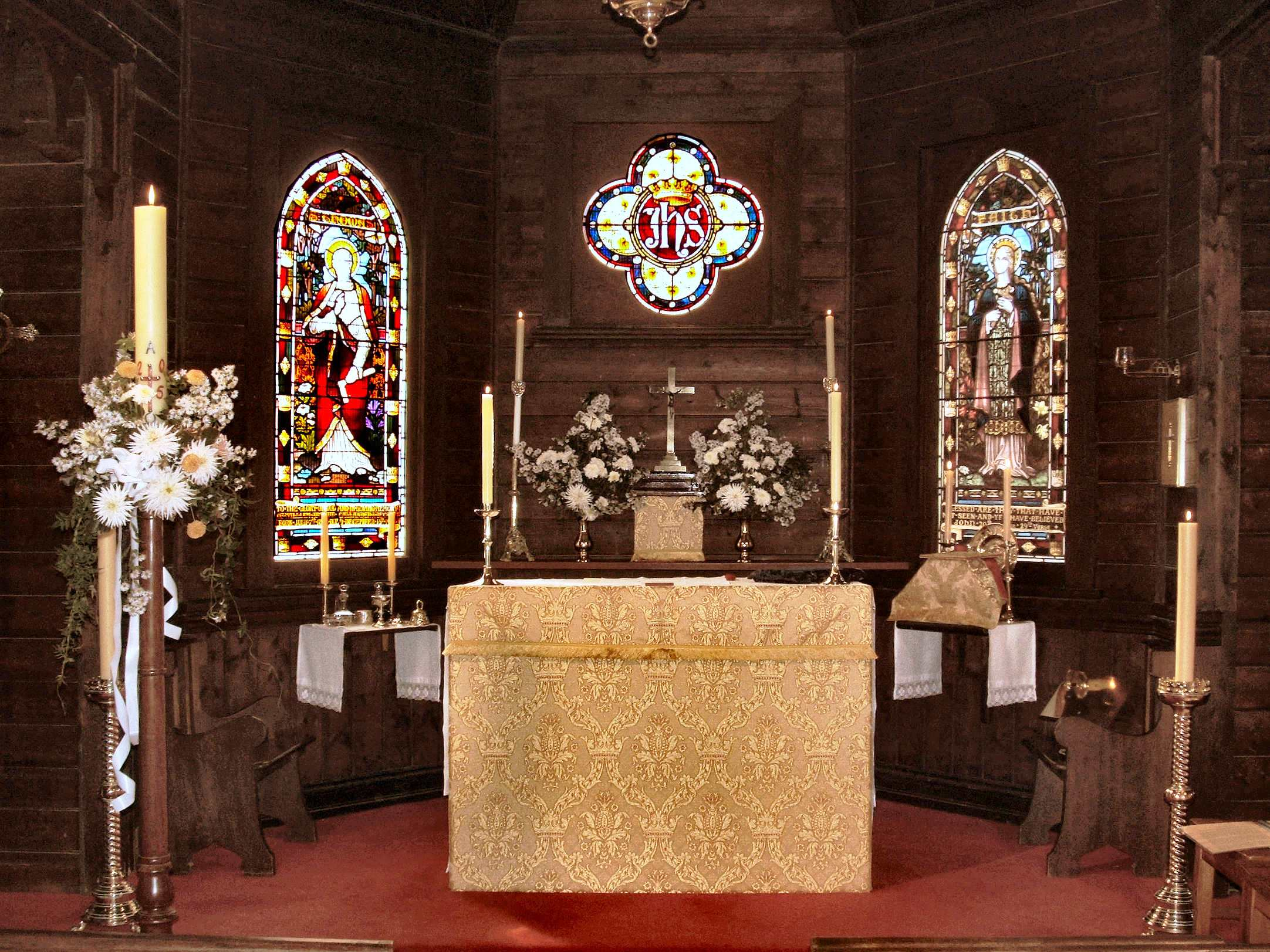
Altar in Bunyip, Victoria, Australia

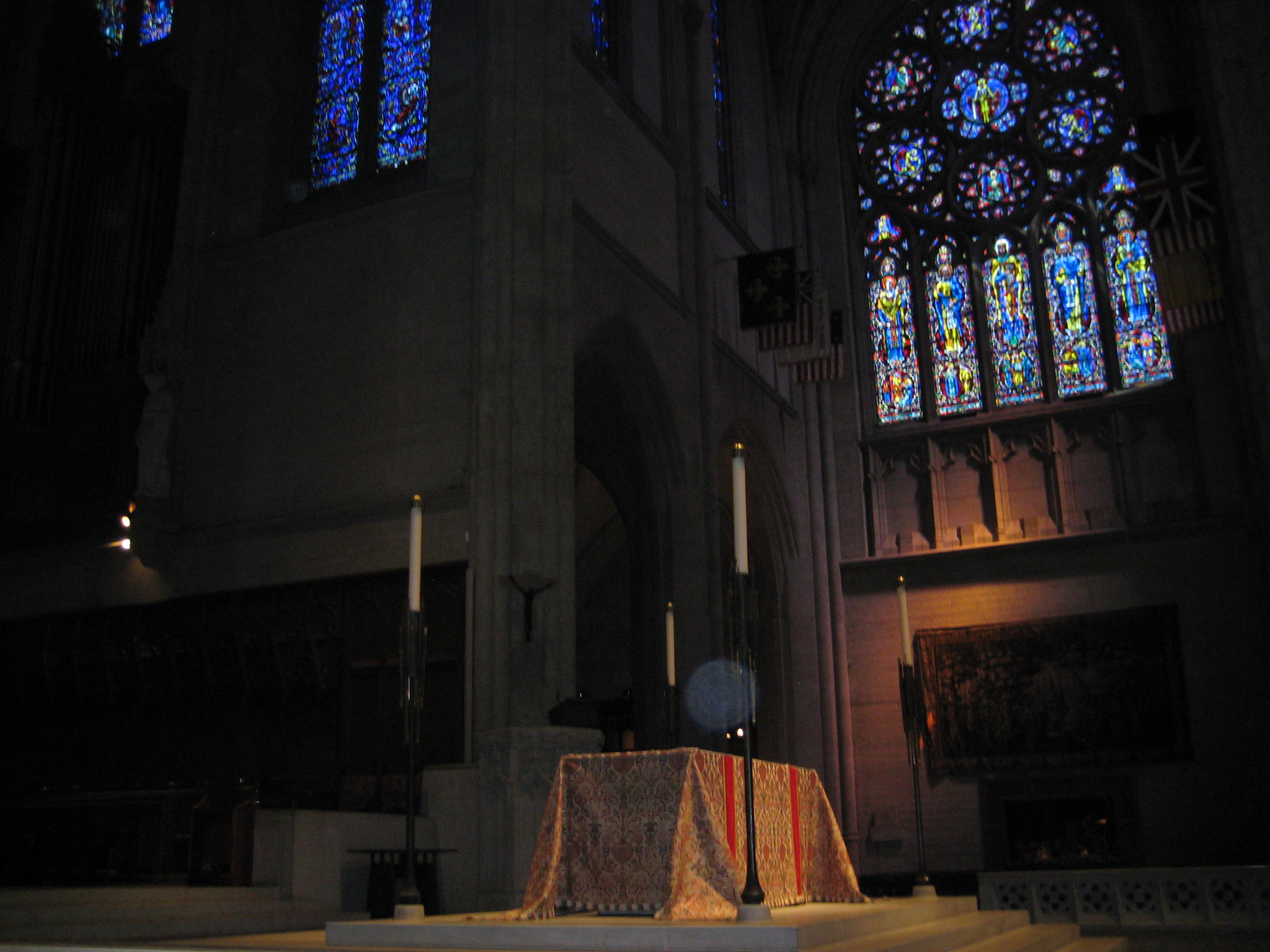
Altar at Grace Cathedral, San Francisco

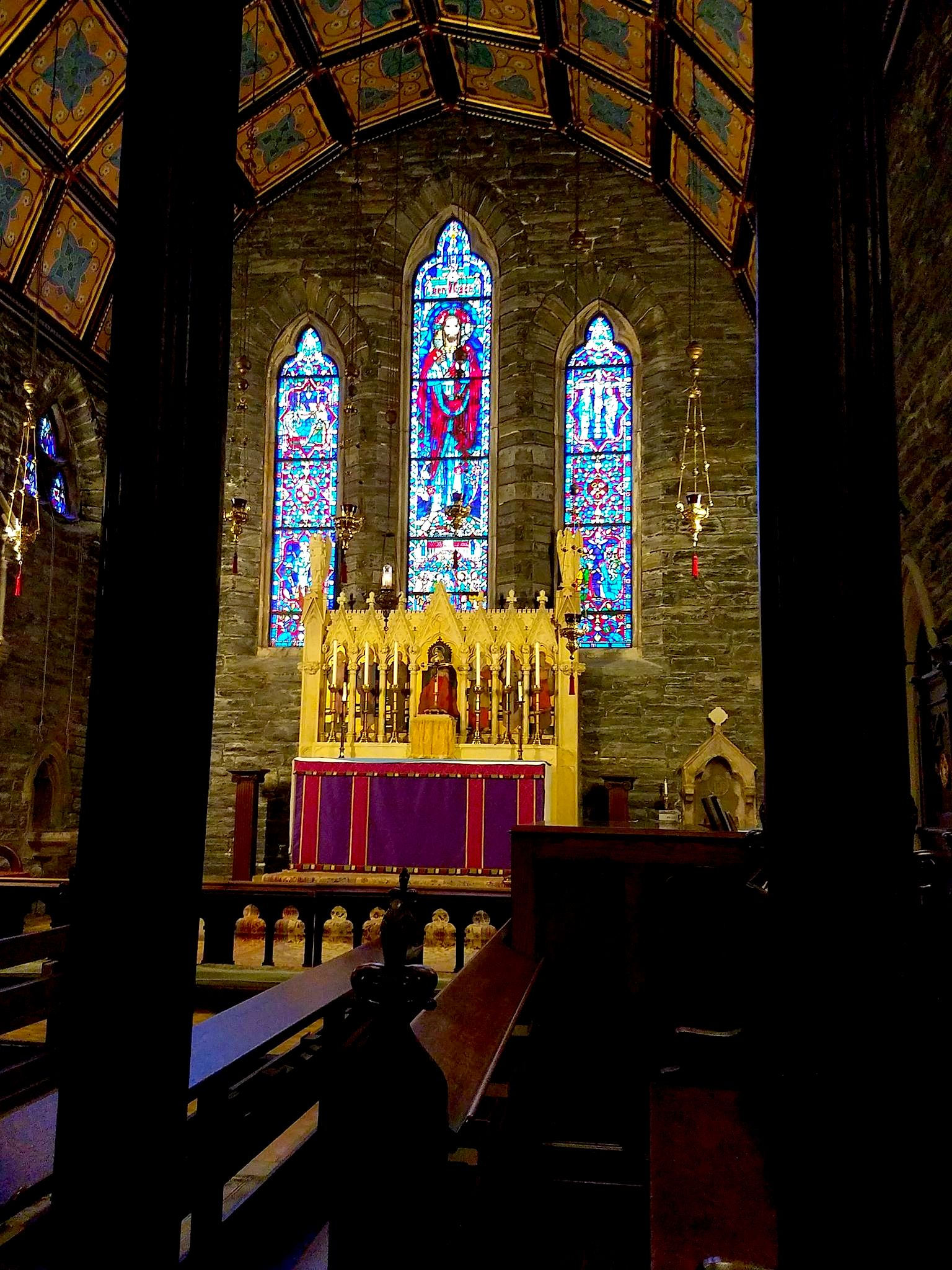
Altar at Anglo-Catholic Church of the Good Shepherd (Rosemont, Pennsylvania)

=== Eastern Christian Rites ===
==== Byzantine Rite ====
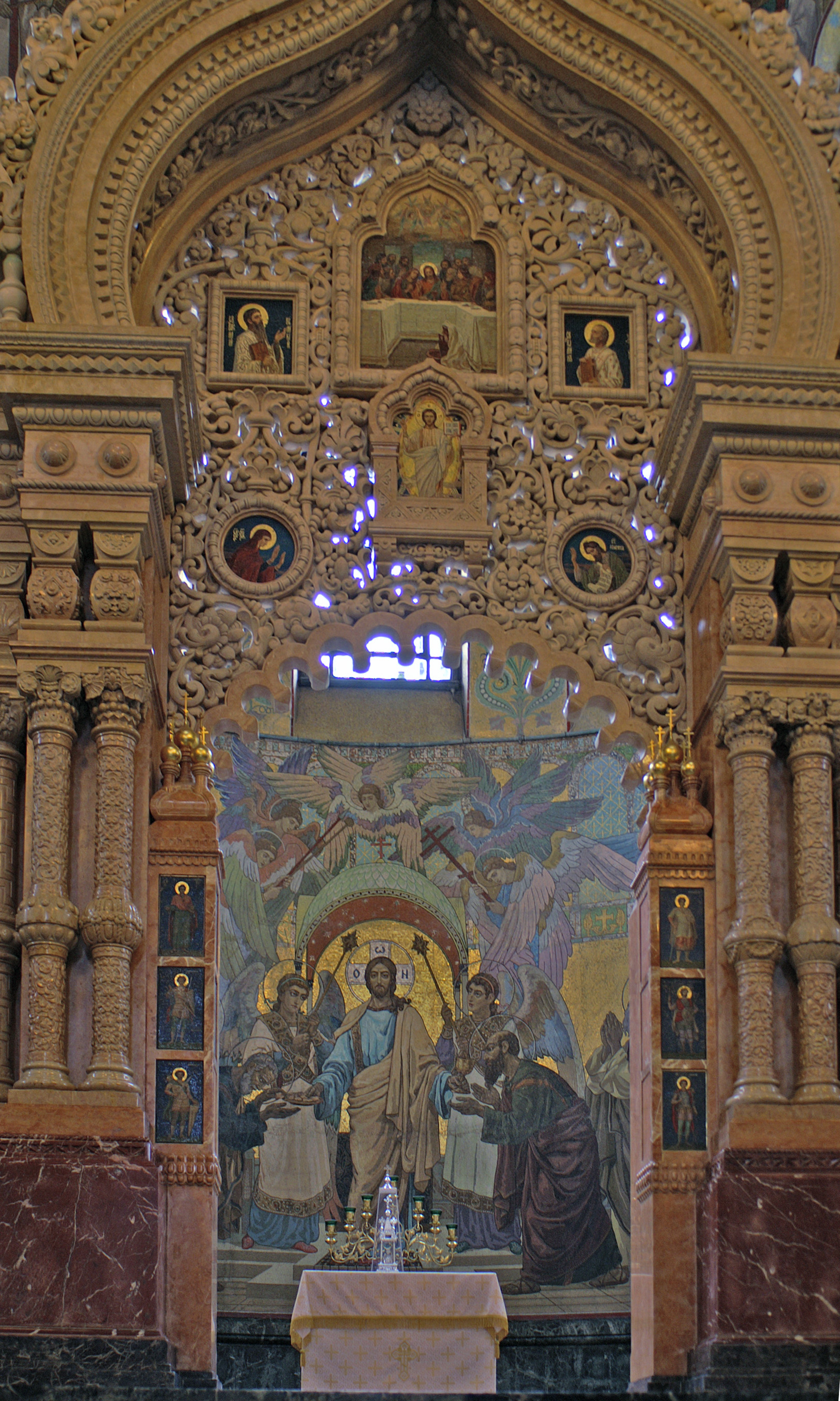
A traditional Russian Orthodox Holy Table (altar), Church of the Saviour on the Blood, St. Petersburg

In Greek, the word βωμός (bômós) can mean an altar of any religion or, in a broader sense, the area surrounding it; that is to say, the entire sanctuary. In an Eastern Orthodox or a Byzantine Rite Eastern Catholic church this sanctuary includes both the area behind the iconostasis, and the soleas (the elevated projection in front of the iconostasis), and the ambo. It is also called the βῆμα (bema). When one enters the sanctuary, one is said to be going into the βωμός or βῆμα. The altar itself in such a church may be referred to as either the “Holy Table” (Greek: Ἁγία Τράπεζα) or the “Throne” (Church Slavonic: Prestól).

For both Eastern Orthodox and Byzantine Eastern Catholics, the Holy Table (altar) is normally free-standing, although in very small sanctuaries it might be flush against the back wall for reasons of space. They are typically about one meter high, and may be made of stone or more often, wood. The exact dimensions may vary, but it is generally square in plan and of reasonable proportion with respect to the size of the sanctuary. It has five legs: one at each corner plus a central pillar for holding the relics placed within it at its consecration. (Note: If, however, the consecration was not performed by a bishop, but by a priest whom he delegated for that purpose, relics are not placed in the Holy Table.)A plain linen covering (Greek: Katasarkion, Slavonic: Strachítsa) is bound to the Holy Table with cords; this is never removed once the altar is consecrated, and is considered to be its “baptismal garment”. The linen covering symbolizes the winding sheet which wrapped the body of Christ he was laid in the tomb. Since the altar is therefore never seen uncovered after this, it tends to be constructed more with sturdiness than aesthetics in mind. Above this first linen cover is a second, ornamented altar cloth (Indítia), often of a brocade in the liturgical color reflecting the feast or changing ecclesiastical season. This outer covering usually reaches the floor and represents the glory of God’s Throne. Many churches place a dust cover on the Holy Table between use, and it is often a simple red cloth or richer material. Sometimes, the cloth covers only the Gospel Book or the front half of the Holy Table, but it may be large enough to cover the entire Holy Table and items on it, including liturgical candlesticks and the seven-branched candelabra.

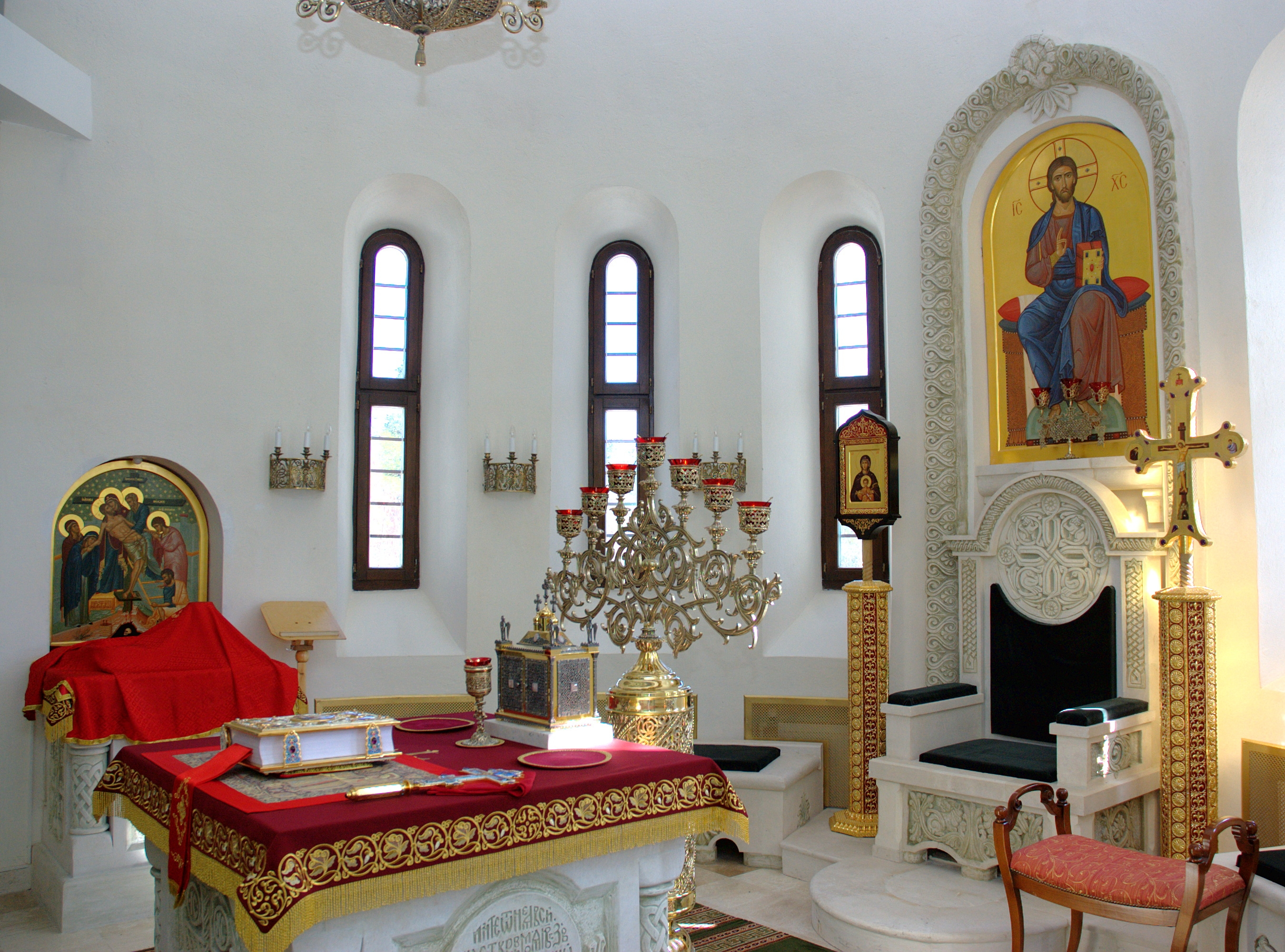
The Holy Place (sanctuary) in the church of the Saint Vladimir Skete at Valaam Monastery. To the left is the Holy Table (altar) with the Gospel Book, the tabernacle, and the seven-branch candlestand. The Table of Oblation is in the background to the left. To the right is the cathedra (bishop's throne).

Atop the altar is the tabernacle (Kovtchég), a miniature shrine sometimes built in the form of a church, inside of which is a small ark containing the reserved sacrament for use in communing the sick. Also kept on the altar is the Gospel Book, under which is the antimension, a silken cloth imprinted with an icon of Christ being prepared for burial, with a relic sewn into it and the signature of the bishop. The Divine Liturgy must be served on an antimension, even if the altar is consecrated and contains relics. A simpler cloth called the ilitón is wrapped around the antimension to protect it, and symbolizes the “napkin” tied around the face of Jesus when he was laid in the tomb (thus a companion to the strachitsa). When not in use, the antimension is left in the center of the Holy Table, and is never removed unless necessary.

The Holy Table may only be touched by ordained members of the higher clergy (Note: Here, the "higher clergy" are bishops, priests, and deacons.) and nothing unconsecrated nor the object of veneration should be placed on it. Objects may also be placed on the altar as part of setting them aside for sacred use. For example, icons are usually blessed by laying them on the Holy Table for a period of time or for a certain number of Divine Liturgies before sprinkling them with holy water, and enshrining them wherever they will be venerated. The Epitaphios on Good Friday, and the Cross on the Feasts of the Cross, are also placed on the Holy Table before they are taken to the center of the church to be venerated by the faithful.

In place of a fabric outer covering, some altars have a permanent, solid cover which may be highly ornamented, richly carved, or even plated in precious metals. A smaller brocade cover is placed on this if the colour of the altar decoration is meant to reflect the liturgical season.

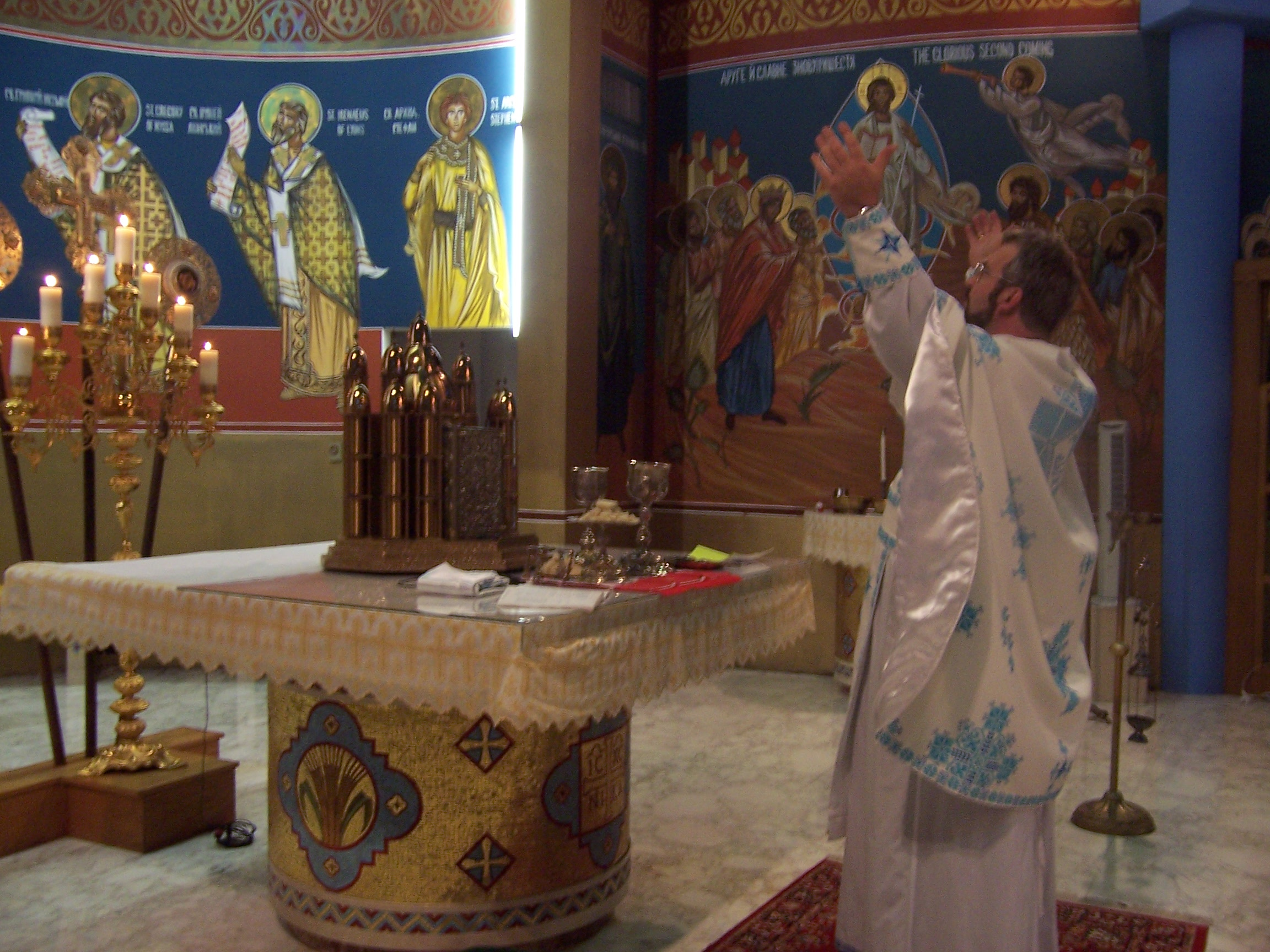
A contemporary Byzantine Catholic altar during the Divine Liturgy at St. Joseph Church in Chicago, Illinois.

The Holy Table is the place for offering the Eucharist, where bread and wine are offered to God the Father and the Holy Spirit is invoked to make his Son Jesus Christ present in the Gifts. It is also where presiding clergy stand at any service, even when no Eucharist is being celebrated and no offering is made other than prayer. When the priest reads the Gospel during Matins (or an All-Night Vigil) on Sunday, he reads it standing in front of the Holy Table, because it represents the Tomb of Christ, and the Gospel lessons for Sunday Matins are always one of the Resurrection appearances of Jesus.

On the northern side of the sanctuary stands another, smaller altar, known as the Table of Oblation (Prothesis or Zhértvennik) at which the Liturgy of Preparation takes place. On it are prepared the bread and wine before the Divine Liturgy. The Prothesis symbolizes the cave at Bethlehem and also the Anointing Stone at which the Body of Christ was prepared after the Deposition from the Cross. A new Table of Oblation is also blessed, sprinkled with holy water, and vested at the consecration of a church, but no relics placed within. Nothing other than sacred vessels, veils, etc. used in the Liturgy of Preparation may be placed on the Table of Oblation. The Epitaphios and Cross are also placed on the Table of Oblation before the priest and deacon solemnly transfer these to the Holy Table. In addition to higher clergy, subdeacons are permitted to touch the Table of Oblation, but no one of lesser rank may do so. This is where a deacon will consume any remaining Gifts (Body and Blood of Christ) after the Divine Liturgy and perform the ablutions.

==== Syro-Maronite Church ====
The Syriac Maronite Church and other Syriac Churches have freestanding altars in most cases, so priests and deacons can circumambulate these with processions and incensations. Traditionally, the Maronite liturgy was offered with the priest and people facing East, but because of modern Liturgical Latinisation, it is common for Maronite liturgies to be offered with the priest on the other side of the altar and facing the people, in imitation of modern practices in the Latin Church.

=== Oriental Rites ===
==== Armenian Rite ====
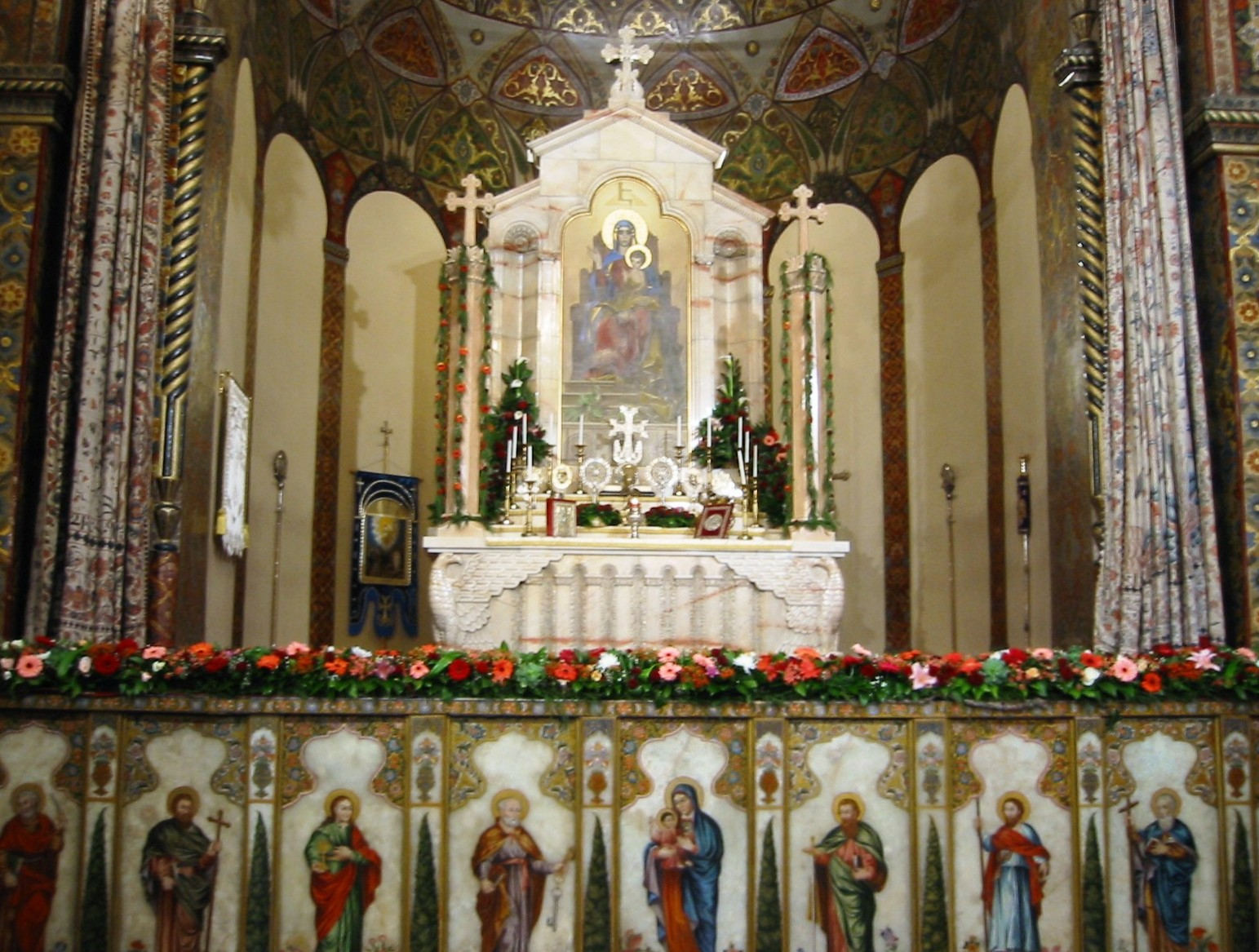
Altar at the Etchmiadzin Cathedral

In the Armenian Rite the altar is placed against the eastern wall of the church, often in an apse. The shape of the altar is usually rectangular, similar to Latin altars, but is unusual in that it will normally have several steps on top of the table, on which are placed the tabernacle, candles, ceremonial fans, a cross, and the Gospel Book. The altar is often located upon a kind of stage above a row of icons.

==== Alexandrian Rite ====
Altars in the Alexandrian (Coptic Orthodox Church) tradition must have a square face upon which to offer the sacrifice. As the standard Coptic liturgy requires the priest to encircle the altar, it is never attached to any wall. Most Coptic altars are located under a baldachin.

==== Ethiopic Rite ====
In Ethiopian Orthodox Church tradition an icon is placed upon but towards the rear of the altar. It is away from the wall as in the Coptic tradition.

==== West Syriac Rite ====
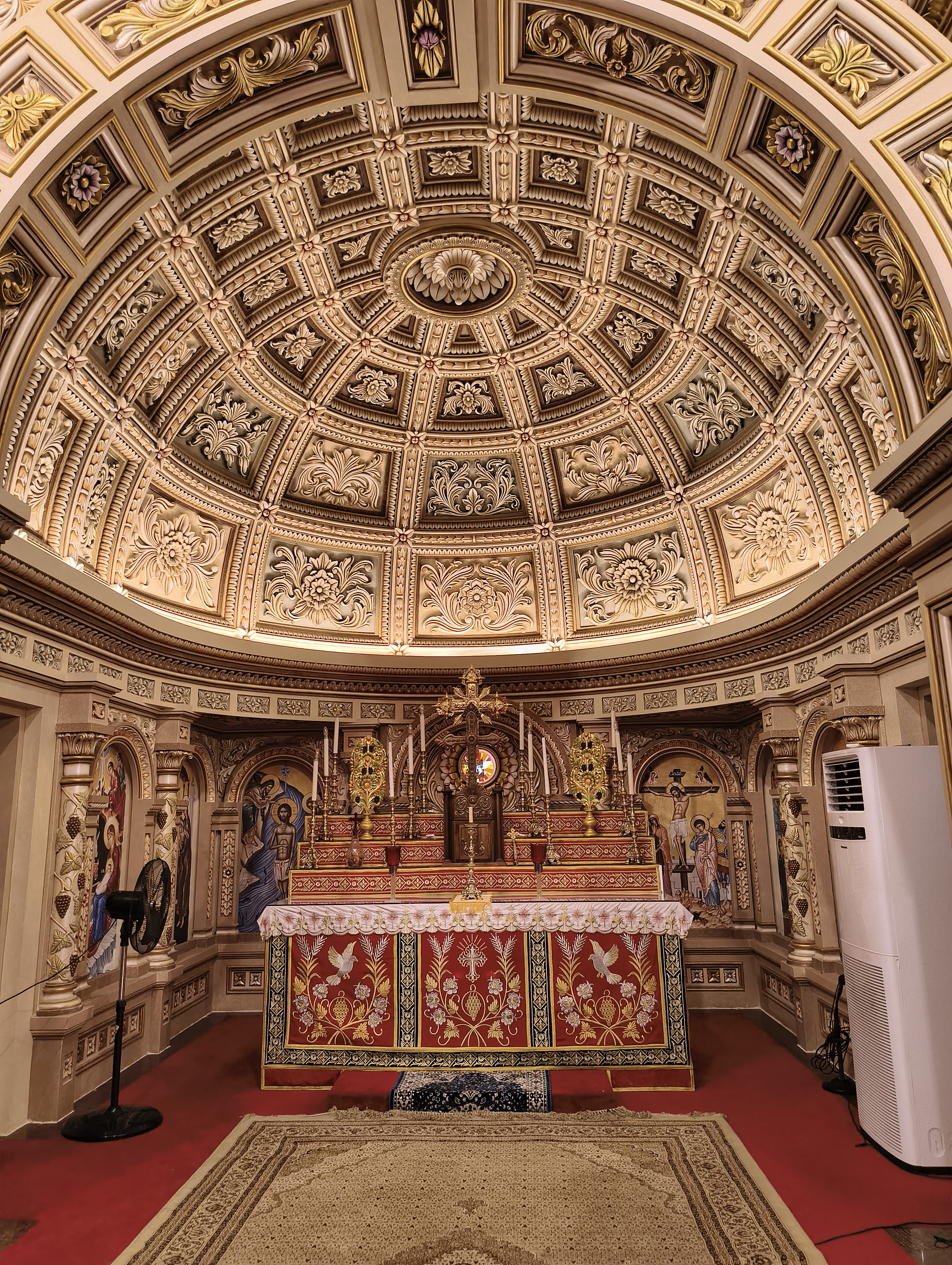
Holy throne (Holy Altar) of Syriac Orthodox Church in India

In the West Syriac Tradition, churches have altars in the eastern part of the sanctuary.

==== East Syriac ====
Altars of East Syriac Rite are similar in appearance to Armenian altars only they are not placed on a stage.

==== Indian Orthodox ====
The Indian Orthodox Church or Malankara Orthodox Syrian Church follows the West Syriac rite combined with Indian traditions and culture, commonly referred to as the Malankara Rite and as such follows a tradition of placing the altar towards the eastern side of the sanctuary. Usually, the altars are paced underneath canopies called Beth' qudisho (transl. Holy House), has steps that houses the tabernacle, 3 to 12 candles (symbolising the 12 Apostles of Christ), a cross in the middle and adorned with exemplary decorations in the form of icons, wooden carvings, distinctly patterned fabrics etc.

The altar in this tradition is referred to as thronose (transl. throne) and the sanctuary is called the Madbaha (transl. sanctuary).

=== War altar ===
A war altar was a mobile altar on which Mass was celebrated before a battle. The ultimate example is the carroccio of the medieval Italian city states, which was a four-wheeled mobile shrine pulled by oxen and sporting a flagpole and a bell. The carroccio also served as the army standard.

Altar stones were used by army chaplains of the Latin Church in the period leading up to the 20th century.

== Hinduism ==
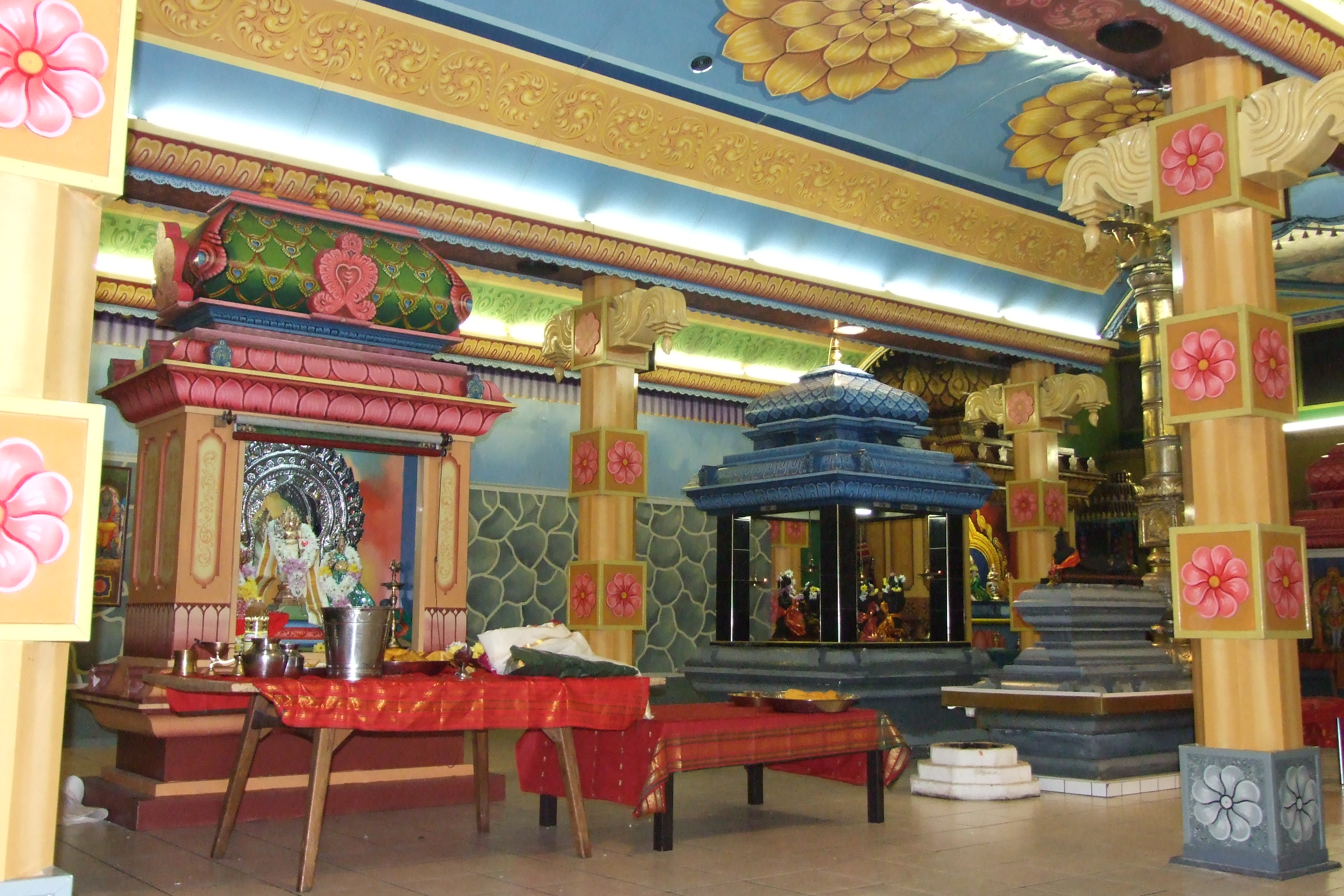
Murugan temple in Roermond, Netherlands

In Hinduism, altars generally contain pictures or statues of deities. Large, ornate altars are found in Hindu temples, shrine, while smaller altars are found in homes and sometimes also in Hindu-run shops and restaurants. The word for temple is mandir (Sanskrit: मन्दिर), the altar (Note: Any enclosure that which contains it, even an alcove or a small cabinet, is included as part of the altar, and shares its status as a temple in miniature.) as hypostatised temple.

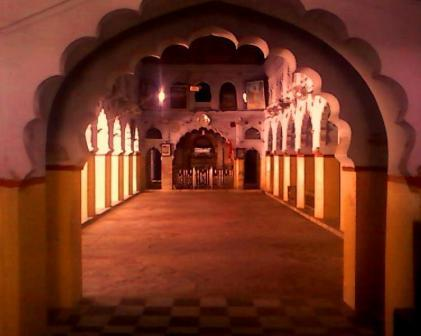
Shree Ganesh Mandir, Jhansi

In South Indian temples, often each deity will have a separate shrine, each contained in a miniature house (specifically, a mandir). These shrines are often scattered around the temple compound, with the three main ones being in the main area. The statue of the deity (murti) is placed on a stone pedestal in the shrine, and one or more lamps are hung in the shrine. There is usually a space to put the puja tray (tray with worship offerings). Directly outside the main shrine, there will be a statue of the deity's vahana or vehicle. The shrines have curtains hung over the entrances, and wooden doors which are shut when the deities are sleeping. Some South Indian temples have one main altar, with several statues placed upon it.

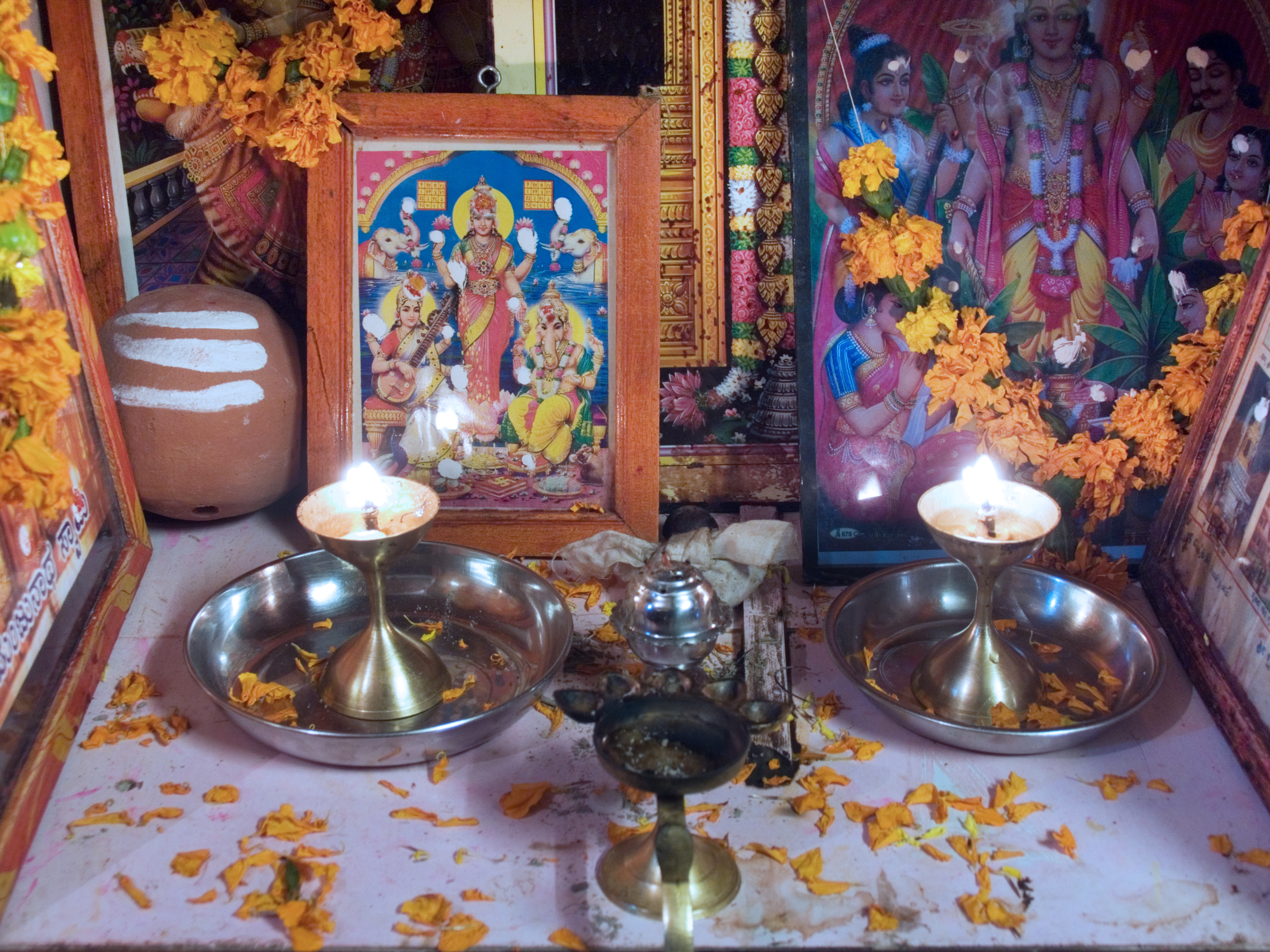
A family altar in India

North Indian temples generally have one main altar at the front of the temple room. In some temples, the front of the room is separated with walls and several altars are placed in the alcoves. The statues on the altars are usually in pairs, each deity with their consort (Radha-Krishna, Sita-Rama, Shiva-Parvati). However, some deities, such as Ganesha and Hanuman, are placed alone. Ritual sacred items such as flowers, incense, conch shells, bells or lamps may be placed on the altar.

Home shrines can be as simple or as elaborate as the householder can afford. Large, ornate shrines can be purchased in India and countries with large Hindu minorities, like Malaysia and Singapore. They are usually made of wood and have tiled floors for statues to be placed upon. Pictures may be hung on the walls of the shrine. The top of the shrine may have a series of levels, like a gopuram tower on a temple. Each Hindu altar will have at least one oil lamp and may contain a tray with puja equipment as well. Hindus with large houses will set aside one room as their puja room, with the altar at one end of it. Some South Indians also place a shrine with pictures of their departed relatives on the right side of the room, and make offerings to them before making offerings to the gods.

See also: Vedi (altar) and Homa (ritual)

== Taoism ==
Detail of c. 1700 painting of a Taoist altar during a ritual for the dead, illustrating a scene from The Plum in the Golden Vase. Note the Three Purities plaques at the back of the altar, and the ritual implements, including incense burner and ritual sword on the right. Bowls hold food offerings for the deceased woman.

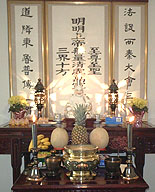
An Ikuantaoist altar

Taoist altars are erected to honor traditional deities and the spirits of ancestors. Taoist altars may be erected in temples or in private homes. Strict traditions and different sects describe the items offered and the ritual involved in the temples, but folk custom in the homes is much freer.

Imperial dynasties built huge altars called jìtán (祭坛) to perform various offering ceremonies called jìsì (祭祀). The Temple of Heaven in Beijing is one of those.

Nearly all forms of Chinese traditional religion involve baibai (拜拜)--bowing towards an altar, with a stick of incense in one's hand. (Some schools prescribe the use of three sticks of incense in the hand at one time.) This may be done at home, or in a temple, or outdoors; by an ordinary person, or a professional (such as a Taoist priest); and the altar may feature any number of deities or ancestral tablets. Baibai is usually done in accordance with certain dates of the lunar/solar calendar (see Chinese calendar).

At certain dates, food may be set out as a sacrifice to the gods or spirits of the departed. (See, for example, Qingming Festival and Ghost Festival.) This may include rice, slaughtered pigs and ducks, or fruit. Another form of sacrifice involves the burning of Hell Bank Notes, on the assumption that images thus consumed by the fire will reappear—not as a mere image, but as the actual item—in the spirit world, and be available for the departed spirit to use. In Taoist folk religion, sometimes chickens, pigs' feet, and pig heads are given as offerings. But in orthodox Daoist practice, offerings should essentially be incense, candles and vegetarian offerings.

== Buddhism ==
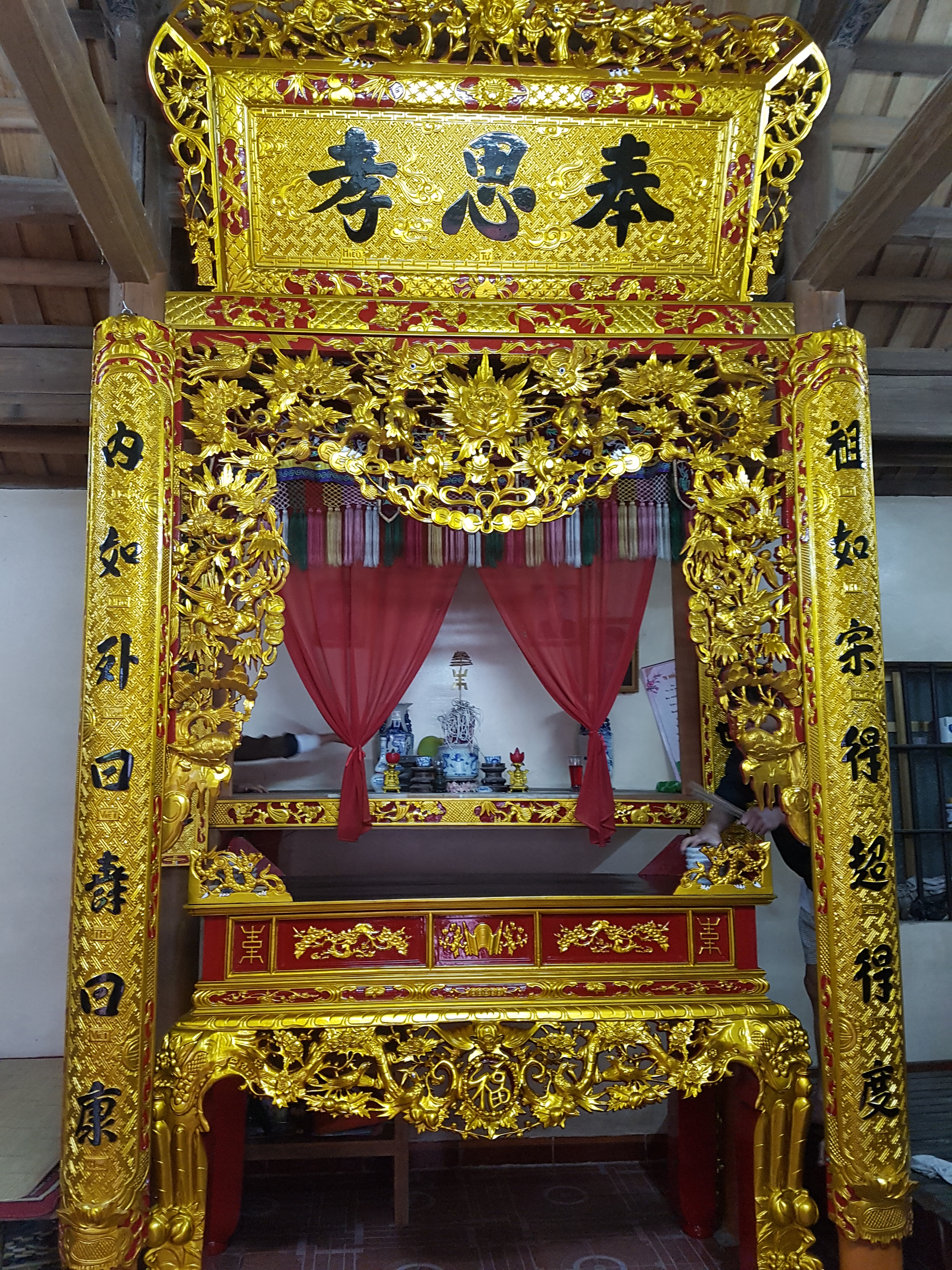
A bàn thờ (worship table) is an altar used in ancestral worship and worship of Buddhas and gods in Vietnam

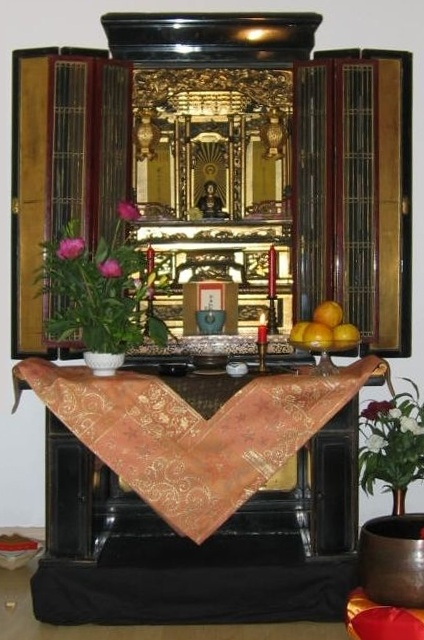
A butsudan at ShinDo Buddhist Temple

In Buddhist-following cultures, structures such as bàn thờ, butsudan, or spirit houses are found in temples or homes. In Japan, the butsudan is a wooden cabinet with doors that enclose and protect a religious image of the Buddha or the Bodhisattvas (typically in the form of a statue) or a mandala scroll, installed in the highest place of honor and centered. The doors are opened to display the image during religious observances. A butsudan usually contains subsidiary religious items—called butsugu—such as candlesticks, incense burners, bells, and platforms for placing offerings such as fruit. Some sects place ihai, memorial tablets for deceased relatives, within or near the butsudan. Butsudans are often decorated with flowers.

The shrine is placed in the temple or home as a place of worship to the Buddha, the Law of the Universe, etc. Scrolls (honzon) or statues are placed in the butsudan and prayed to morning and evening. Zen Buddhists also meditate before the butsudan.

The original design for the butsudan began in India, where people built altars as an offering-place to the Buddha. When Buddhism came to China and Korea statues of the Buddha were placed on pedestals or platforms. The Chinese and Koreans built walls and doors around the statues to shield them from the weather and also adapted elements of their respective indigenous religions. They could then safely offer their prayers, incense, etc. to the statue or scroll without it falling and breaking.

== Shinto ==
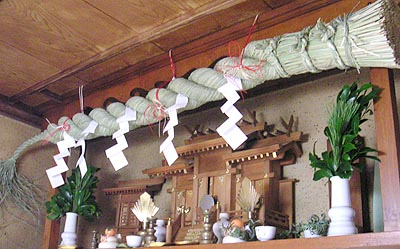
A Shinto Kamidana (household altar) in Japan. Note the shimenawa, a rope demarking the sanctuary area seen above, along the ceiling.

In Shinto, altars are found in shrines. Originating in ancient times, himorogi are temporarily erected sacred spaces or "altars" used as a locus of worship. A physical area is demarcated with branches of green bamboo or sakaki at the four corners, between which are strung sacred border ropes (shimenawa). In the center of the area a large branch of sakaki festooned with sacred emblems (hei) is erected as a yorishiro, a physical representation of the presence of the kami and toward which rites of worship are performed.

In more elaborate cases, a himorogi may be constructed by placing a rough straw mat upon the ground, then erecting a ceremonial eight-legged stand (hakkyaku an) upon the mat, and decorating the stand with a frame festooned with sacred border ropes and sacred border emblems. Finally the sakaki branch is erected in the center of this stand as the focus of worship.

== Norse paganism ==
A basic altar, called a hörgr, was used for sacrifice in Norse paganism. The hörgr was constructed of piled stones, possibly in a wood (harrow), and would be used in sacrifices and perhaps other ceremonies as well.

A possible use of the hörgr during a sacrifice would be to place upon it a bowl of the blood of an animal sacrificed to a Norse deity (e.g. a goat for Thor, a sow for Freyja, a boar for Freyr), then dipping a bundle of fir twigs into it and sprinkling the participants with the blood. This would consecrate the attendees to the ceremony, such as a wedding.

=== Asatru ===
In Nordic Modern Pagan practice, altars may be set up in the home or in wooded areas in imitation of the hörgr of ancient times. They may be dedicated to Thor, Odin, or other Nordic deities.

== Neopaganism ==
In neopaganism there is a wide variety of ritual practice, running the gamut from a very eclectic syncretism to strict polytheistic reconstructionism. Many of these groups make use of altars. Some are constructed merely of rough-hewn or stacked stone, and some are made of fine wood or other finished material.

=== Neo-Druidism ===
Modern Neo-Druidism may also make use of altars, often erected in groves. Though little is known of the specific religious beliefs and practices presided over by the ancient Druids, modern people who identify themselves as Druids are free to incorporate their imagination in developing ceremonies and the use of ritual objects in keeping with their belief system. The "Order of Common Worship" of the Reformed Druids of North America' Liturgy of the Druids calls for a fire to be started "in or near the altar" and makes use of various objects such as a chalice, staves, and a plant offering. If no altar is used, the objects may be placed on the ground.

== High places ==
High places are elevated areas on which altars have been erected for worship in the belief that, as they were nearer heaven than the plains and valleys, they are more favourable places for prayer. High places were prevalent in almost all ancient cultures as centers of cultic worship.

High places in Israelite (Hebrew: Bamah, or Bama) or Canaanite culture were open-air shrines, usually erected on an elevated site. Prior to the conquest of Canaan by the Israelites in the 12th–11th century BCE, the high places served as shrines of the Canaanite fertility deities, the Baals (Lords) and the Asherot (Semitic goddesses). In addition to an altar, matzevot (stone pillars representing the presence of the divine) were erected.

The practice of worship on these spots became frequent among the Hebrews, though after the temple was built it was forbidden. Such worship was with difficulty abolished, though denounced time after time by the prophets as an affront to God. A closely related example is a "backyard" altar, so to speak. Before there was a set temple and an established altar people built their own altars. After the temple was built use of these altars was forbidden. Unlike the case of high places, "backyard" altar worship was quickly eradicated. In following years, the practice drastically decreased in popularity.

== See also ==
- Altar candle
- Altar cards
- Altar Crucifix
- Altars in Latin America
- Altars in Roman Catholicism
- Analogion
- Ara Pacis
- Back-choir
- Cathedral diagram
- Credence table
- Dambana
- Double Altar
- Ofrenda
- Predella
- Prothesis
- Sacrament
- Sacred architecture
- Winged altar

== Sources ==
- This article incorporates text from a publication now in the public domain: Wood, James, ed. (1907). "Altar". The Nuttall Encyclopædia. London and New York: Frederick Warne.
- This article incorporates text from a publication now in the public domain: Easton, Matthew George (1897). "Altar". Easton's Bible Dictionary (New and revised ed.). T. Nelson and Sons.
