= Altars in Mesoamerica =

The history of altars in Mesoamerica is complex. From its original purpose for the worshipping of gods and human sacrifice, the altar transitioned from being a symbol of non-Christian worship to a worldwide symbol of Christianity.

== History ==
In Mesoamerica, altars positioned on top of temples were used for human sacrifice and animal sacrifice to appease the gods and allow for a fruitful crop. A special altar to the sun was used for sacrifices in coronation rites, signifying the importance of the god. The east–west path of the sun determined the principal ritual axis in the design of Aztec cities. Thus the altar held great importance in determining the design of the city.

One of the most explicit visual depictions of ritual associated with an altar is evident in an altar unearthed in the ruins of El Cayo. This altar, commonly referred to as "Altar 4" portrays a man seated before a table altar, scattering grains of incense. In the carved image, the altar supports an incense burner as well. This imagery is associated with underworld deities and rites of fire starting. Altar 4 also communicates the sense of the altar as the site of an assemblage of offerings and ritual items: the incense burner contains kindling sticks, as well as an arrangement of feathers all clustered around a cloth bundle. According to many archaeologists, "the altar is seen as a locus of a piling on of ritual goods is a constant theme in the programs of iconographic decoration worked into Maya pedestals and table altars."

One of the other purposes of the altar is to honor the dead. On Todos Santos, or All Saints Day, people welcome back the souls of their departed loved ones by offering altars or ofrendas, commemorating them. These altars include pictures of the deceased, food they enjoyed in life, statues of the Virgin Mary, pictures of saints, marigolds, paper cut-out figurines of skulls, and many other items. Some of the altars are as high as 10-12 feet, while others are significantly smaller. They are covered in white satin or plastic, which could be representative of a shroud.

Despite the altar's origins, it was later adopted as a symbol of Christianity.
