= Double Altar =

A double altar in Roman Catholicism is an altar that has a double front.

It is constructed in this way so that Mass may be celebrated on both sides of it at the same time. These altars were frequently found in churches of religious communities in which the choir is behind the altar so that whilst one priest is celebrating Mass for the community in choir, another may celebrate for the laity assembled in the church.
