= Lists of national parks =

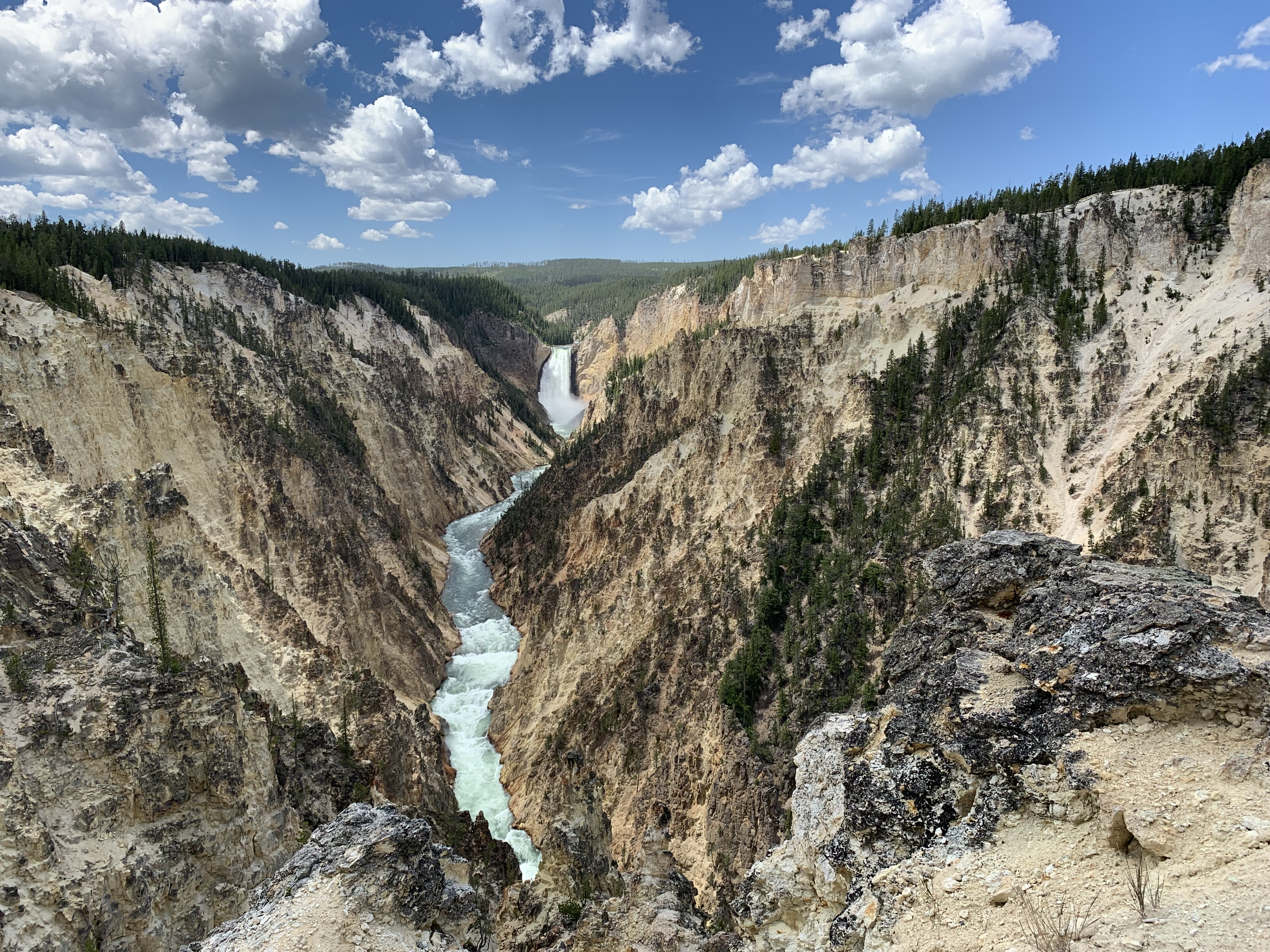
Yellowstone National Park in the United States was the first national park in the world.

This is a list of the number of national parks per nation, as defined by the International Union for Conservation of Nature. Nearly 100 countries around the world have lands classified as a national park by this definition.

Note that this article links to list articles of national parks by country on Wikipedia in the "Country" column in the tables.

== Africa ==
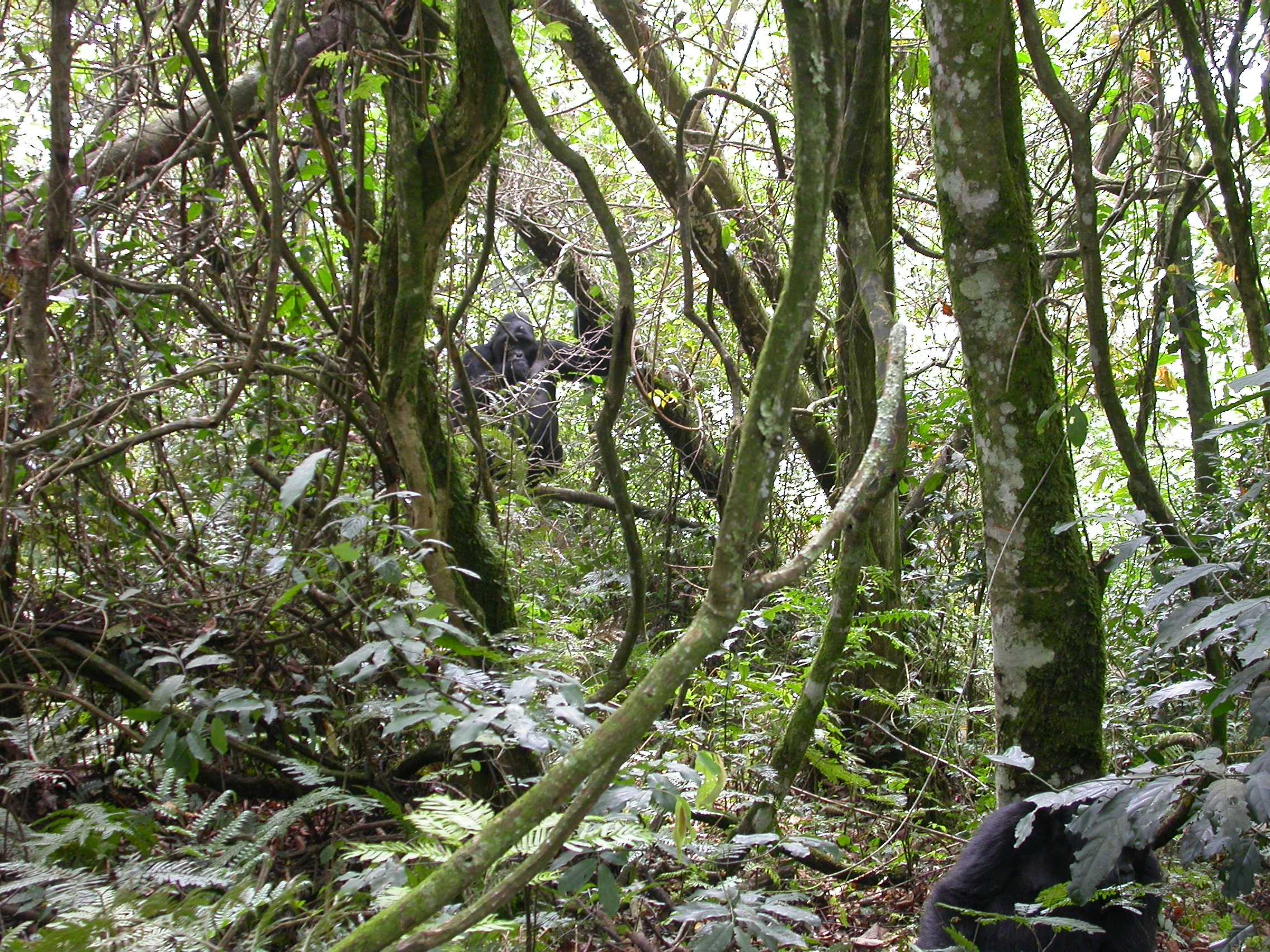
Mountain gorillas in Bwindi Impenetrable National Park, Uganda

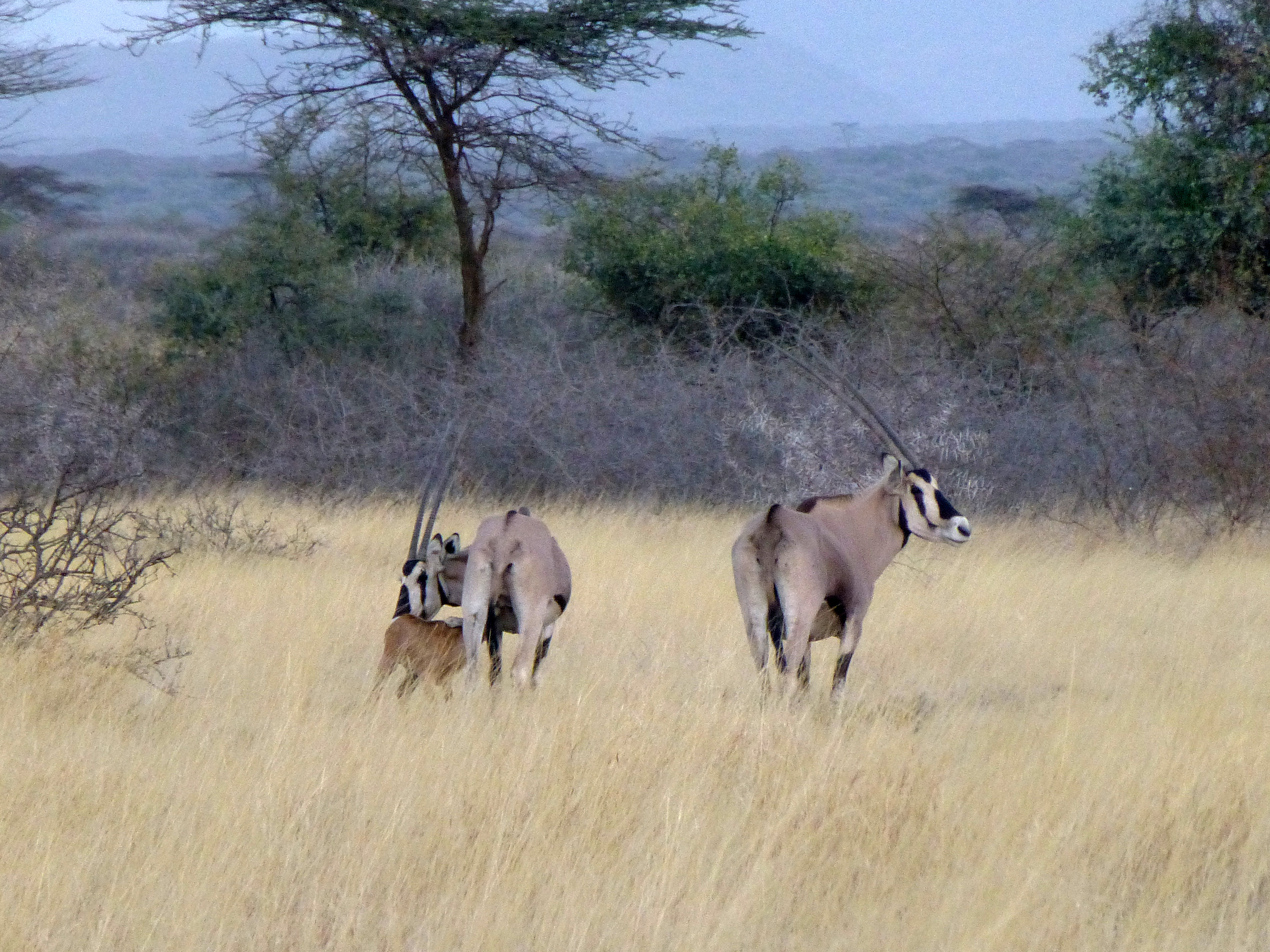
Oryx in the Awash National Park, Ethiopia

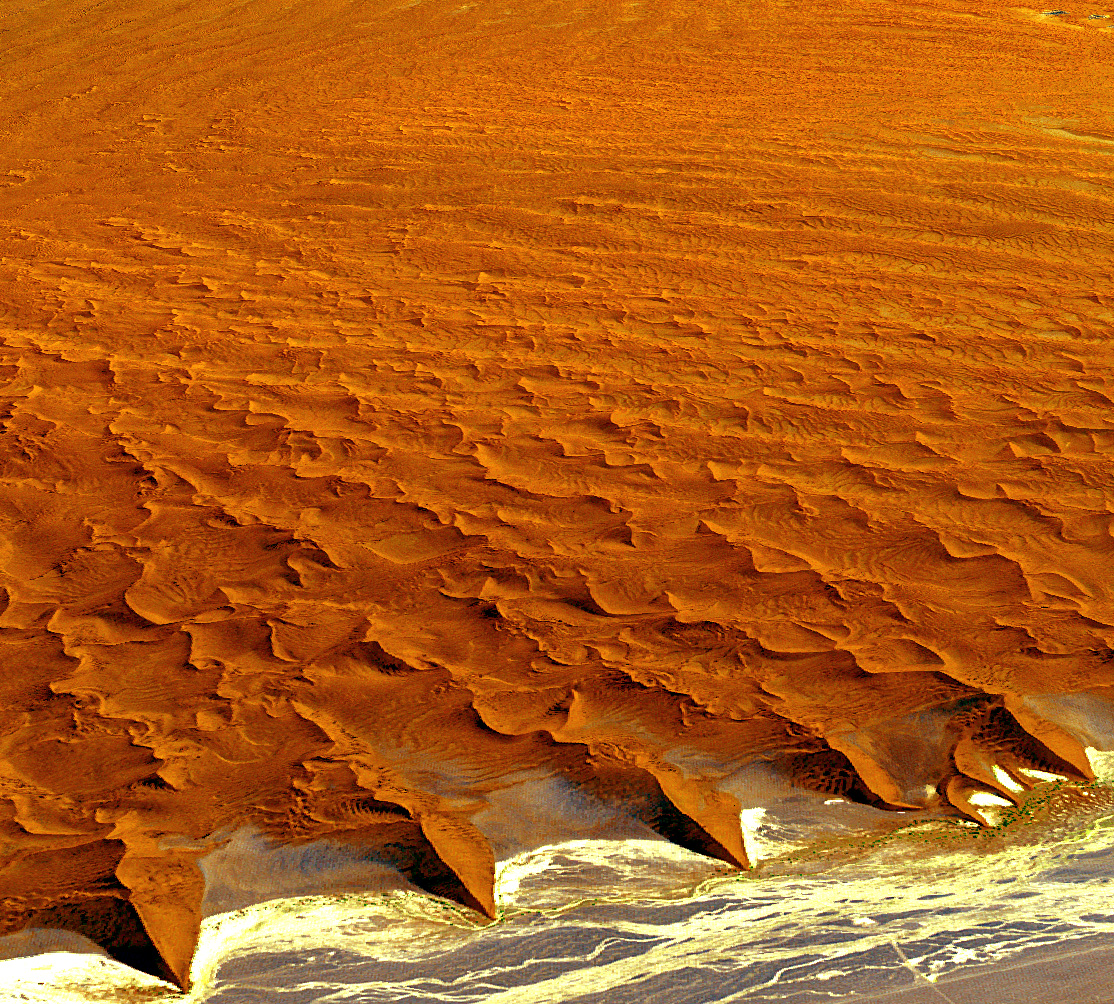
Namib-Naukluft National Park in Namibia

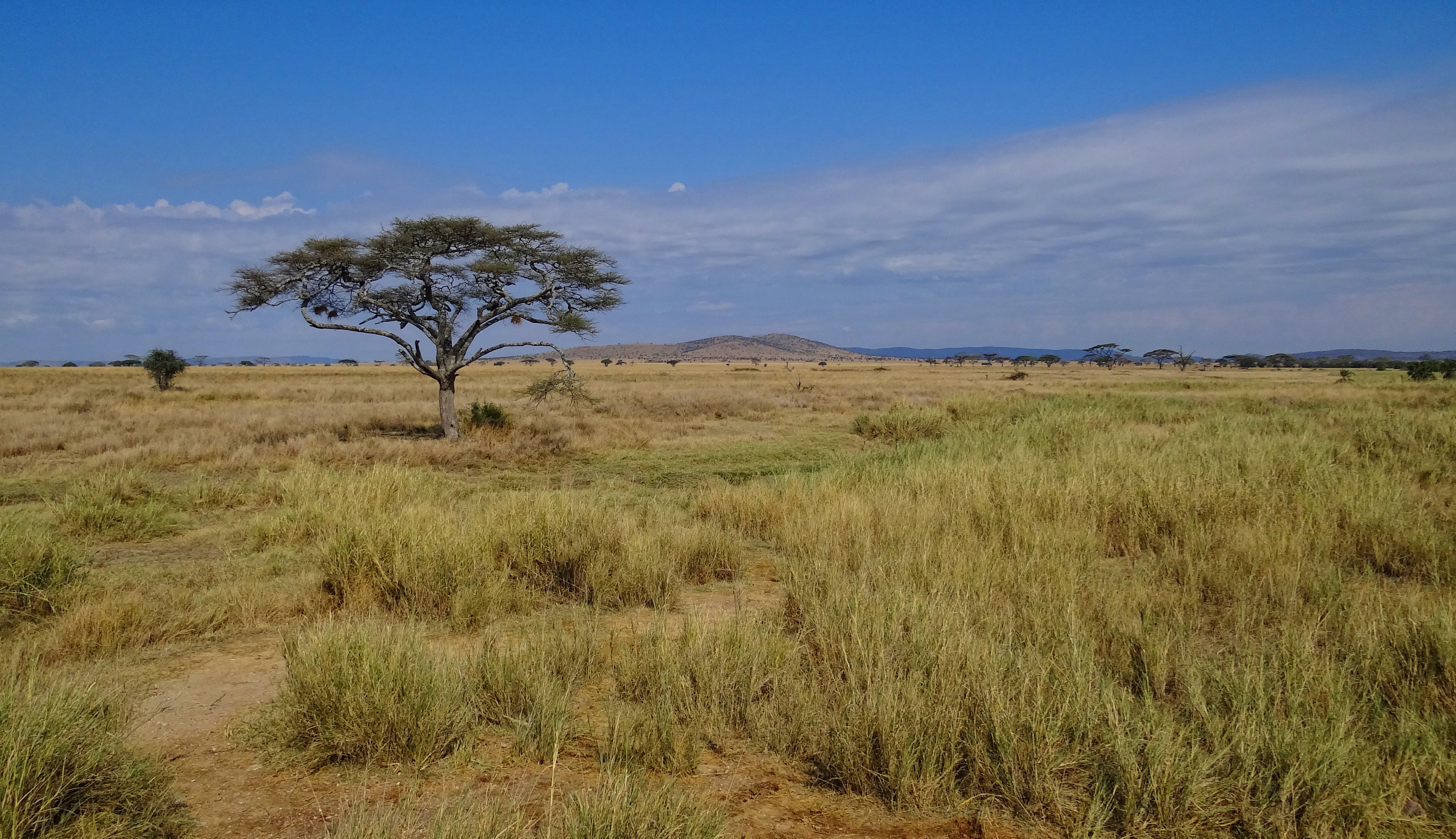
Landscape of Serengeti National Park in Tanzania

| Country | Oldest (year) | Number of parks | Total area km^{2} | Percentage of country |
|---|---|---|---|---|
| Algeria | | 11 | 527,661.68 | 22.1% |
| Angola | | 8 | | |
| Ascension Island | 2005 | 1 | | |
| Benin | | 2 | | |
| Botswana | 1968 | 4 | 56,258 | 9.67% |
| Burkina Faso | 1954 | 4 | | |
| Burundi | 1934 | 3 | 1,014 | 3.6% |
| Cameroon | | 27 | | |
| Cape Verde | | 1 | | |
| Central African Republic | | 5 | | |
| Chad | 1963 | 4 | 14,540 | 1.13% |
| Comoros | 2010 | 6 | 1,165.77 | 52.16% |
| Democratic Republic of the Congo | 1925 | 9 | | |
| Republic of the Congo | | 5 | | |
| Côte d'Ivoire | 1953 | 9 | | |
| Djibouti | | 3 | | |
| Egypt | 1983 | 5 | 4,353 | 4.3% |
| Equatorial Guinea | | 3 | | |
| Eritrea | | 2 | | |
| Eswatini | 1967 | 1 | 300 | 1.74% |
| Ethiopia | 1959 | 22 | | |
| Gabon | 2002 | 13 | 26,766 | 10.0% |
| Gambia | 1978 | 5 | 169.9 | 1.5% |
| Ghana | 1971 | 7 | | |
| Guinea | | 3 | | |
| Guinea-Bissau | | 6 | | |
| Kenya | 1946 | 24 | | |
| Lesotho | | 2 | | |
| Liberia | | 8 | | |
| Libya | | 6 | | |
| Madagascar | 1958 | 26 | 14,327 | 2.4% |
| Malawi | 1966 | 6 | | |
| Mali | | 4 | | |
| Mauritania | | 2 | | |
| Mauritius | 1994 | 3 | 7,160 | 3.5% |
| Morocco | 1942 | 12 | | |
| Mozambique | 1960 | 7 | 40,970 | 5.1% |
| Namibia | | 20 | 10,878 | 13.2% |
| Niger | 1954 | 1 | | |
| Nigeria | 1979 | 8 | 20,156 | 3.0% |
| Rwanda | | 3 | | |
| Sao Tome and Principe | | 1 | | |
| Senegal | | 6 | | |
| Seychelles | 1973 | 9 | | |
| Sierra Leone | 1986 | 8 | | |
| Somalia | | 6 | | |
| South Africa | 1926 | 21 | 37,000 | 3% |
| South Sudan | | 6 | | |
| Sudan | | 4 | | |
| Tanzania | 1951 | 23 | 99,306.5 | |
| Togo | | 3 | | |
| Tunisia | 1980 | 17 | | |
| Uganda | 1952 | 10 | | |
| Zambia | | 28 | 240,836.48 | 32% |
| Zimbabwe | | 11 | | |

== Asia ==
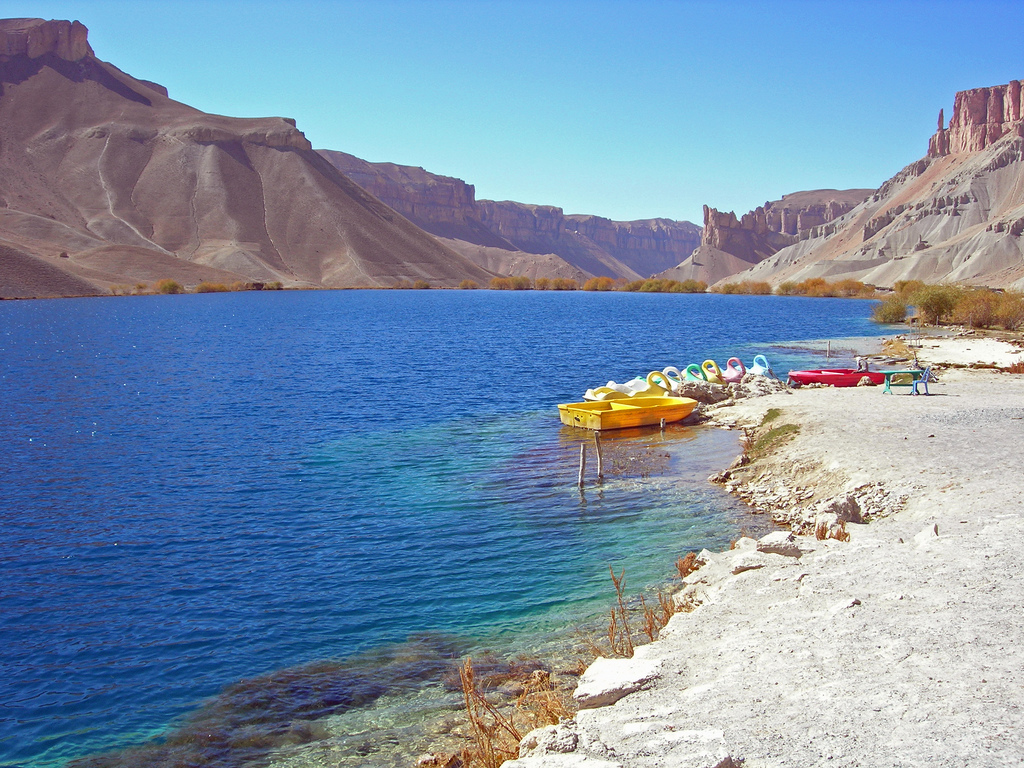
Lake Band-e-Amir the national park of Afghanistan.

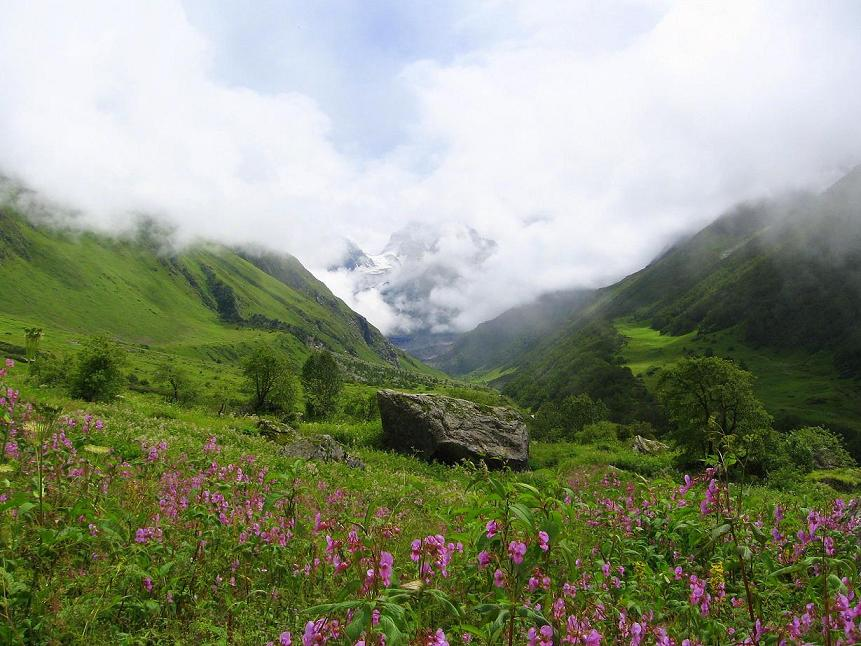
Valley of Flowers National Park, Uttarakhand, India

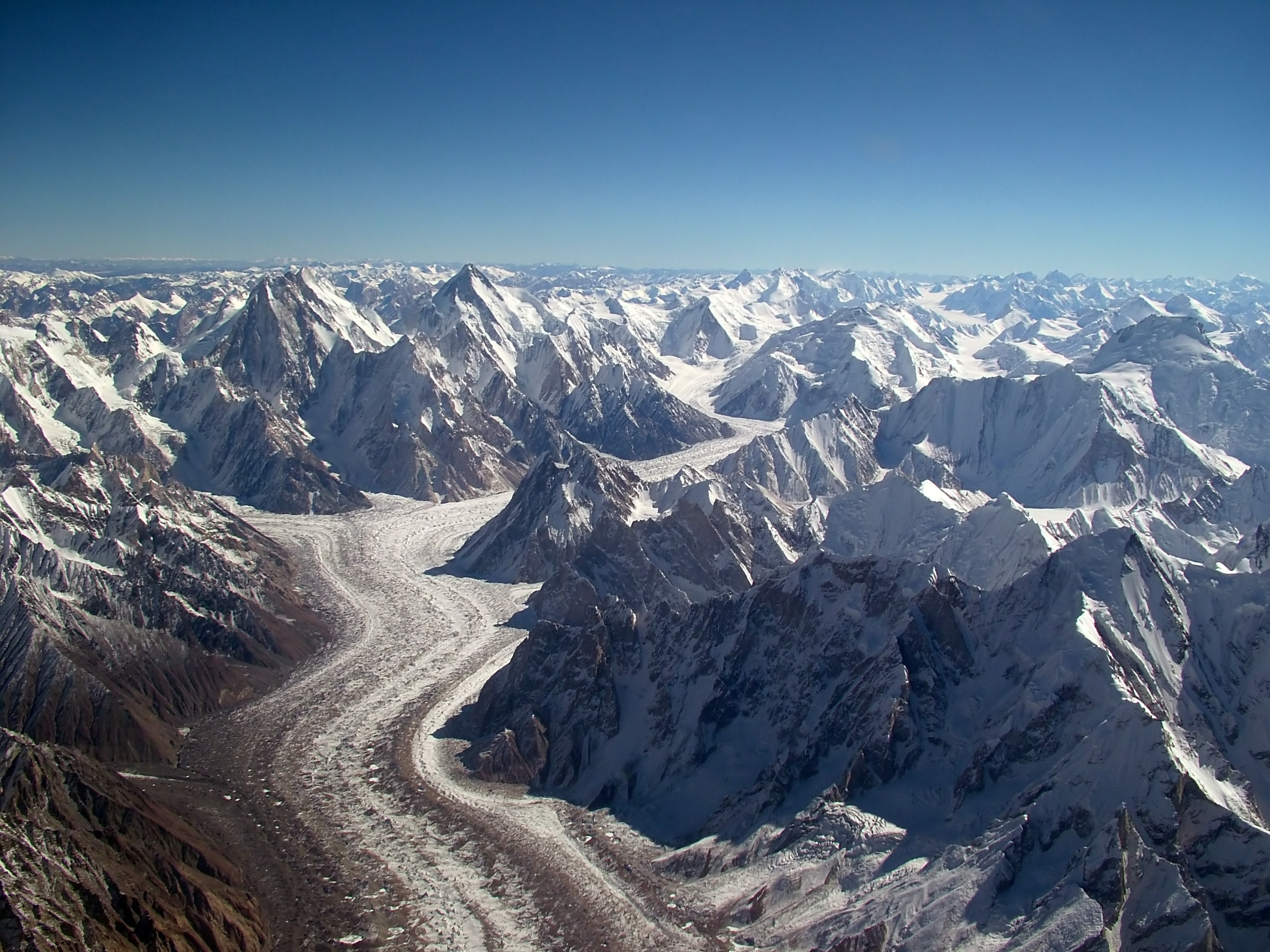
Baltoro Glacier in Central Karakoram National Park, Gilgit–Baltistan, Pakistan

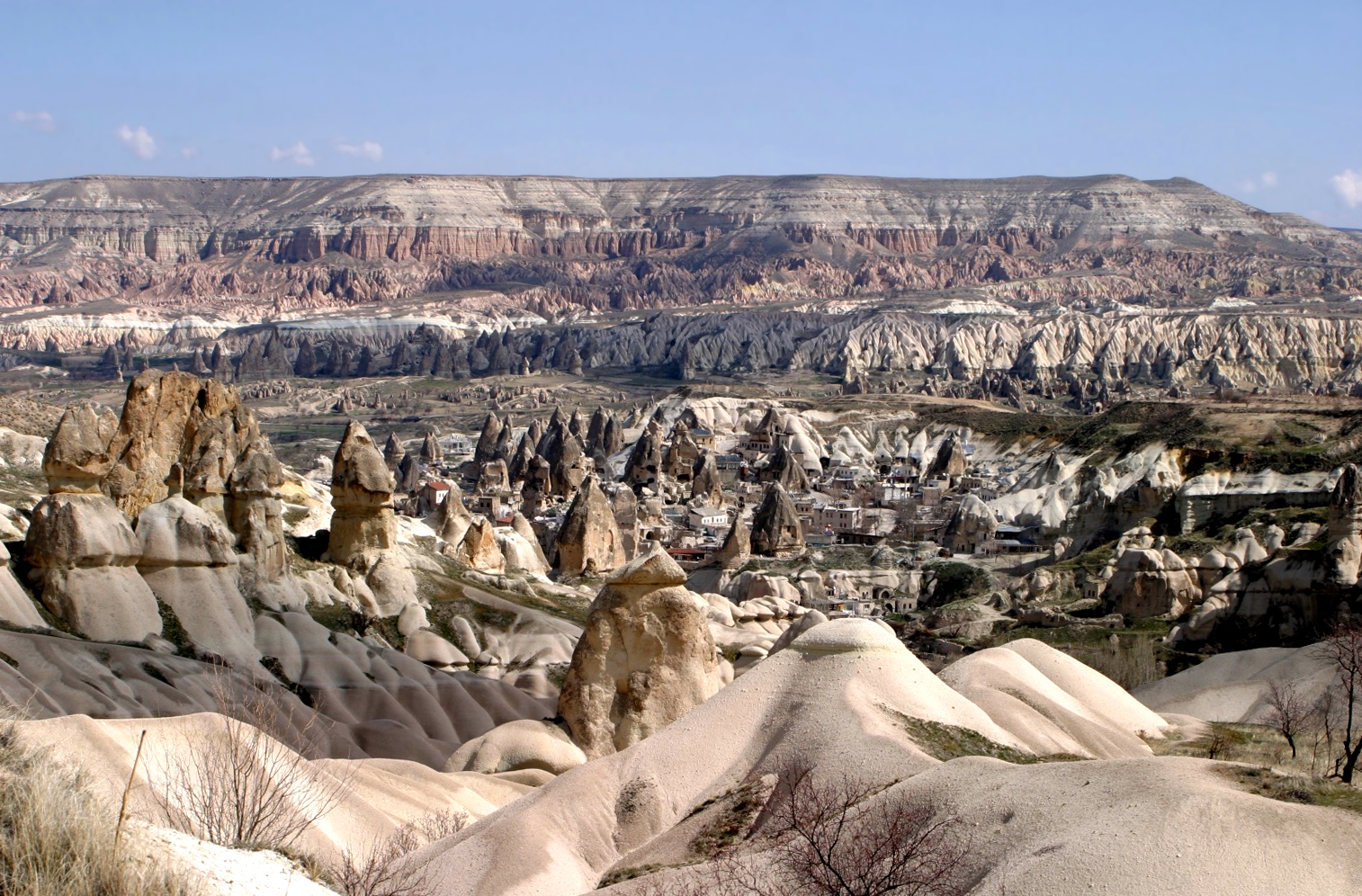
View of Cappadocia landscape in Turkey

| Country | Oldest (year) | Number of parks | Total area km^{2} | Percentage of country |
|---|---|---|---|---|
| Afghanistan | 2009 | 2 | 11,516.28 | |
| Armenia | 1978 | 4 | 1,176 | |
| Azerbaijan | 2003 | 11 | | |
| Bangladesh | | 18 | | |
| Bhutan | | 5 | 8,008 | 20.8% |
| Brunei | | 2 | | |
| Cambodia | 1993 | 13 | 7,422.5 | 4.1% |
| China | 916 | 8 | | |
| Georgia | | 11 | | |
| India | 1936 | 116 | 38,136 | 1.16% |
| Indonesia | 1980 | 56 | 160,520 | 8.43% |
| Iran | 1974 | 23 | 19,757 | 1.2% |
| Iraq | | 2 | | |
| Israel | 1964 | 49 | 6,400 | 30% |
| Japan | 1934 | 34 | 20,482 | 5.4% |
| Jordan | | | | |
| Kazakhstan | 1985 | 13 | 18,876 | 0.7% |
| Kyrgyzstan | 1976 | 13 | 7,246.7 | 3.625% |
| Lebanon | | 4 | | |
| Maldives | | | | |
| Malaysia | | 29 | | |
| Mongolia | 1783 | 29 | | |
| Myanmar | 1982 | 9 | 10,351 | 1.5% |
| Nepal | 1973 | 12 | 34,426 | 23.39% |
| North Korea | | 9 | | |
| Oman | 1997 | 1 | 220 | 0.07% |
| Pakistan | 1972 | 26 | 132,919.71 | 6.63% |
| Philippines | 1933 | 36 | 1,820 | 0.6% |
| Qatar | | | | |
| Russia | 1983 | 64 | 155,672 | |
| Saudi Arabia | | 3 | | |
| South Korea | 1967 | 24 | 6,954 | 6.92% |
| Sri Lanka | 1938 | 26 | | |
| Republic of China (Taiwan) | 1984 | 9 | 3,104 | 8.6% |
| Tajikistan | 1992 | 1 | 26,000 | 18% |
| Timor-Leste | 2007 | 1 | 1,236 | 8.27% |
| Thailand | 1961 | 156 | 61,413 | 11.96% |
| Turkey | 1958 | 52 | 9,446 | 2.63% |
| United Arab Emirates | | 4 | | |
| Uzbekistan | | 4 | | |
| Vietnam | 1962 | 32 | | |
| Yemen | | 2 | | |

== Europe ==
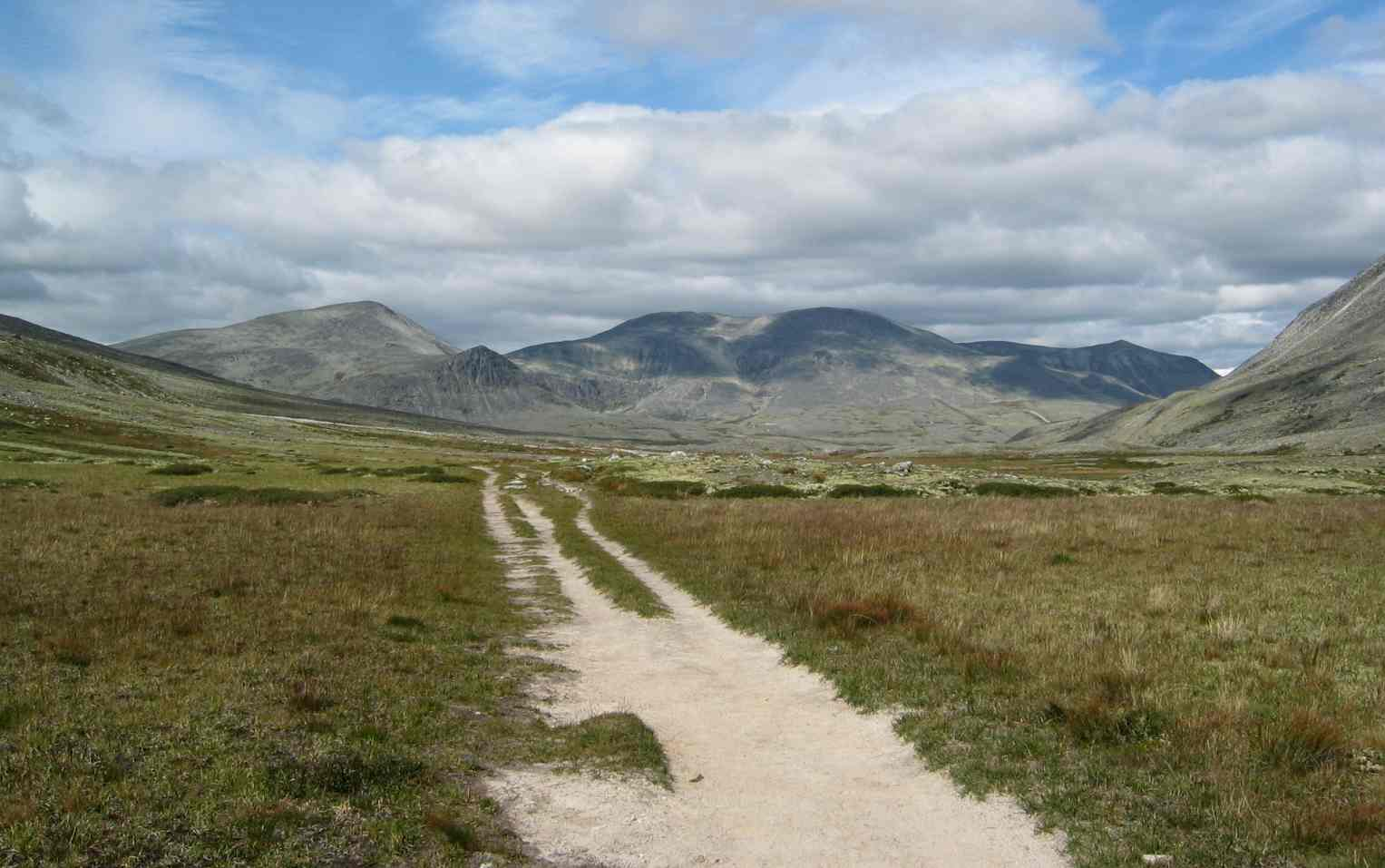
Rondane National Park, Norway

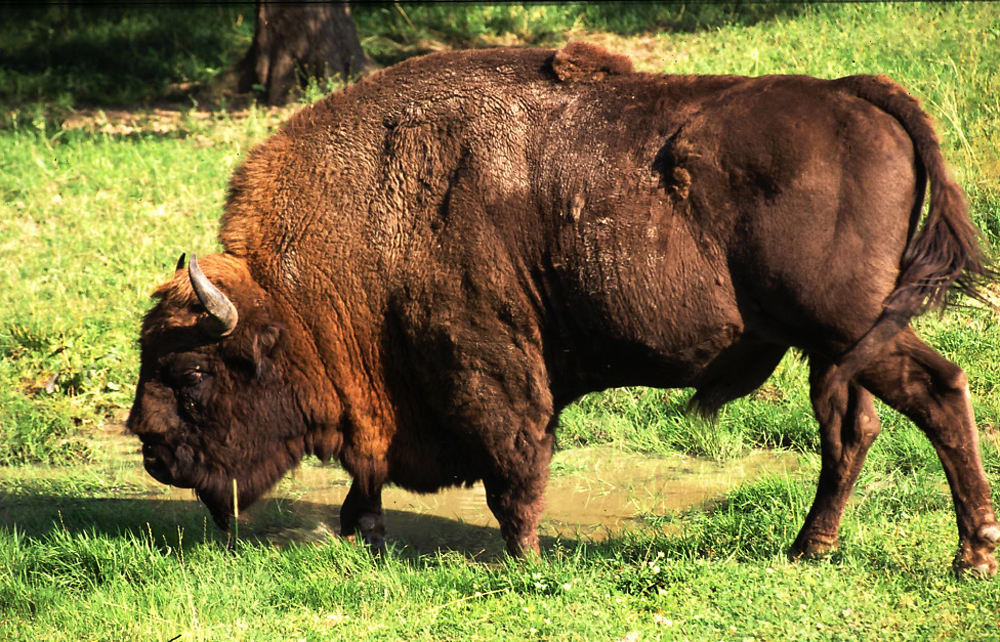
A wisent in the Białowieża Forest, Poland

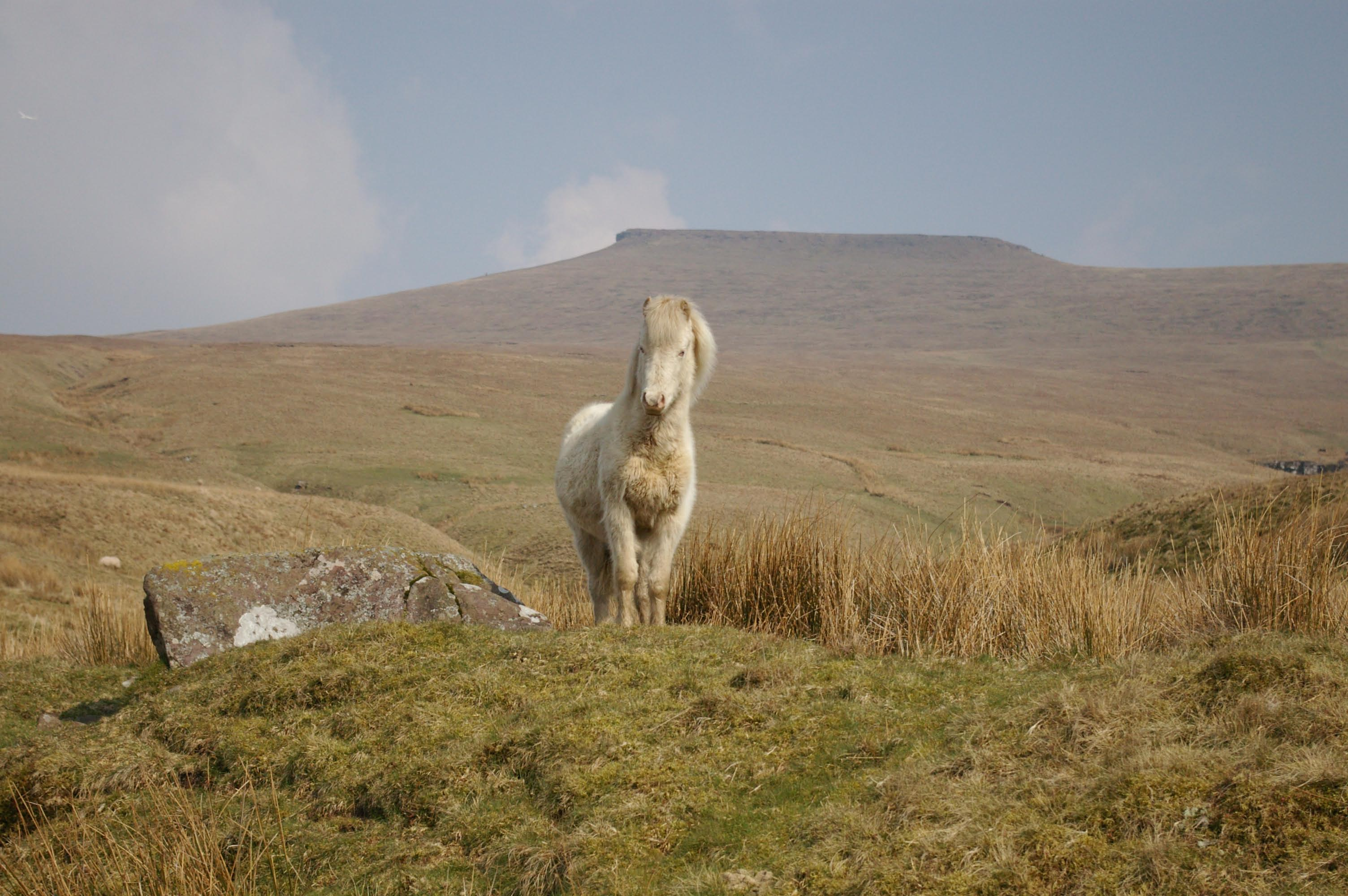
A Welsh Mountain Pony in the Brecon Beacons National Park (Bannau Brycheiniog), Wales

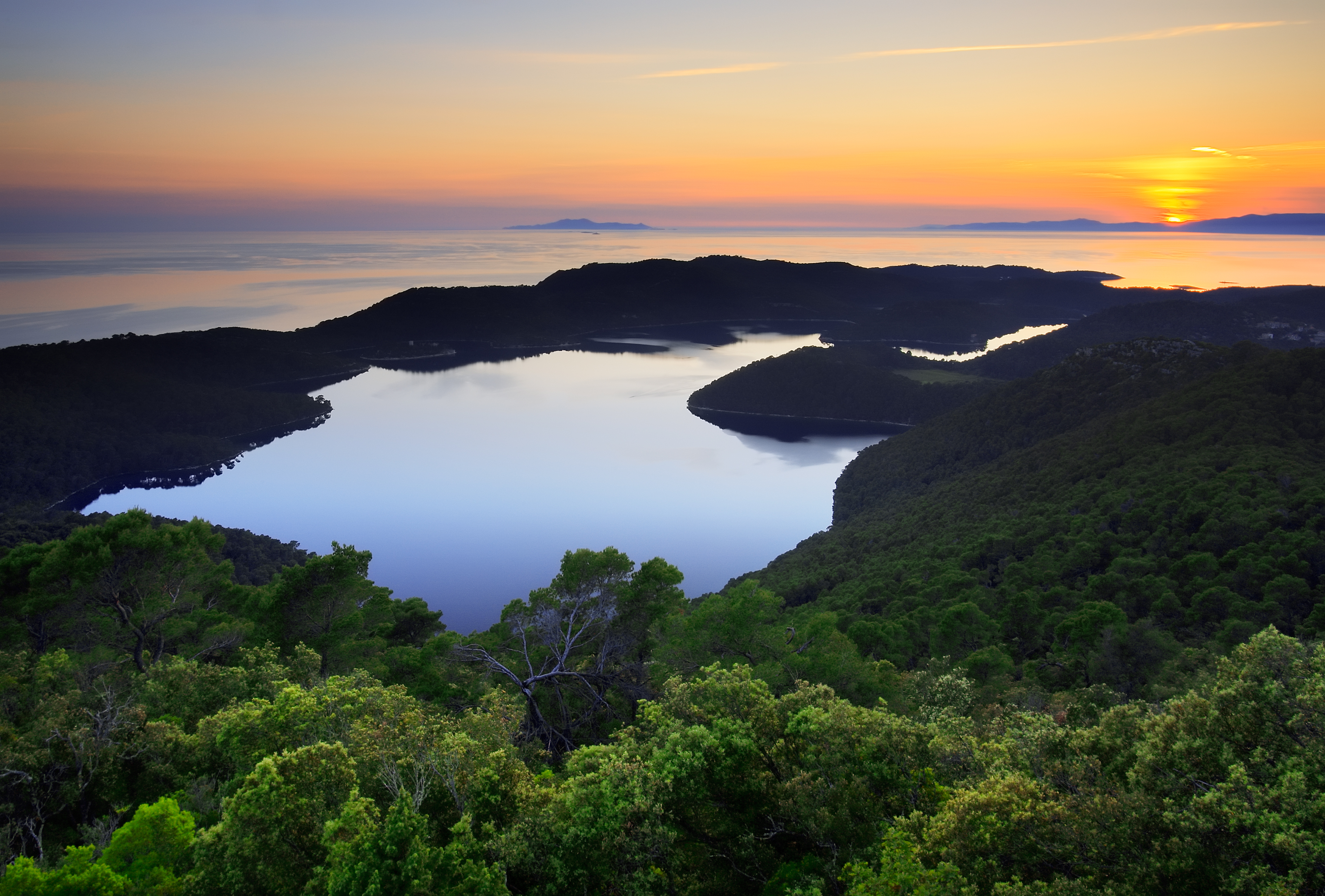
A sunset over the lakes in the Mljet National Park in Croatia

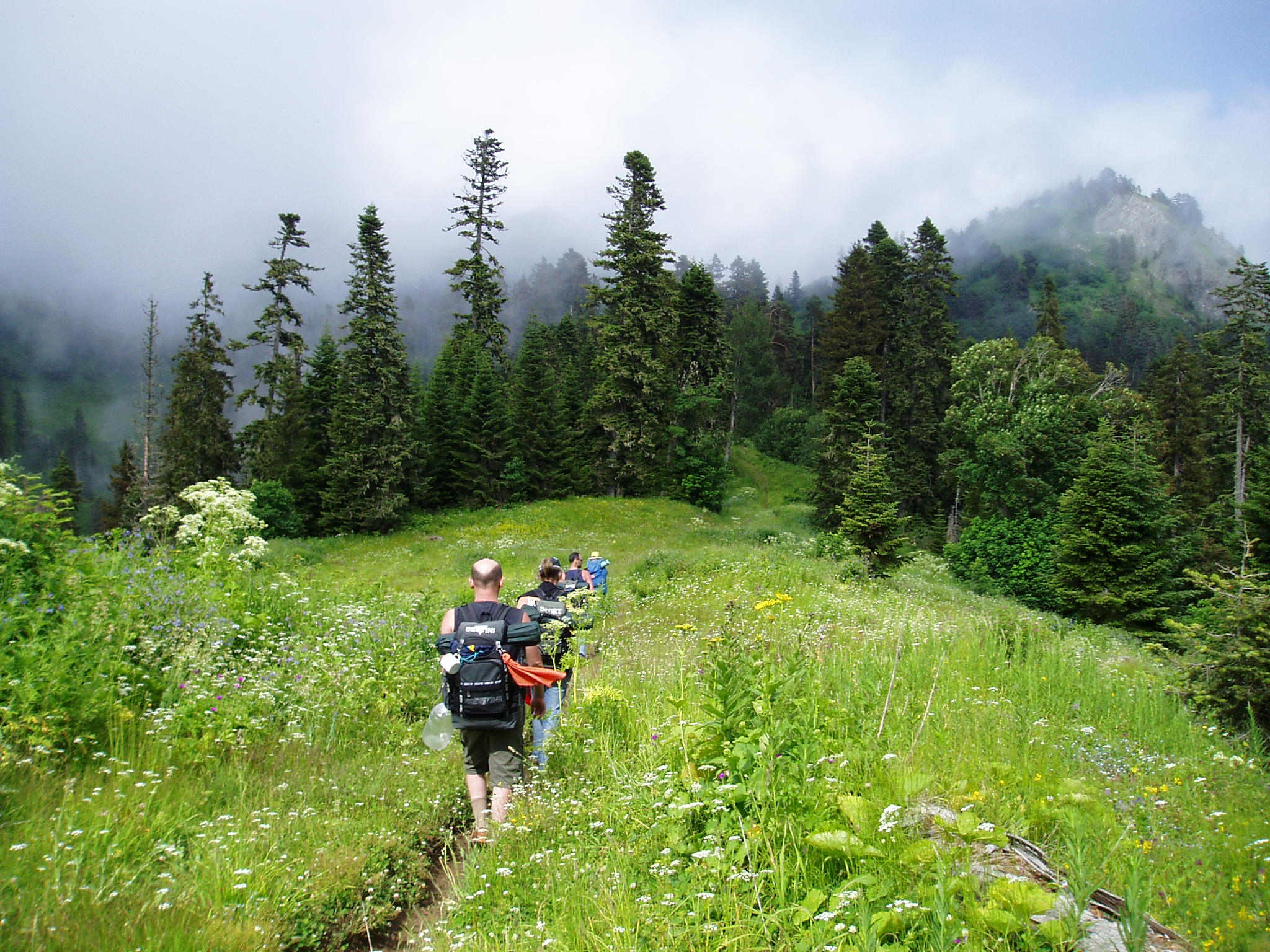
Borjomi National Park, Georgia

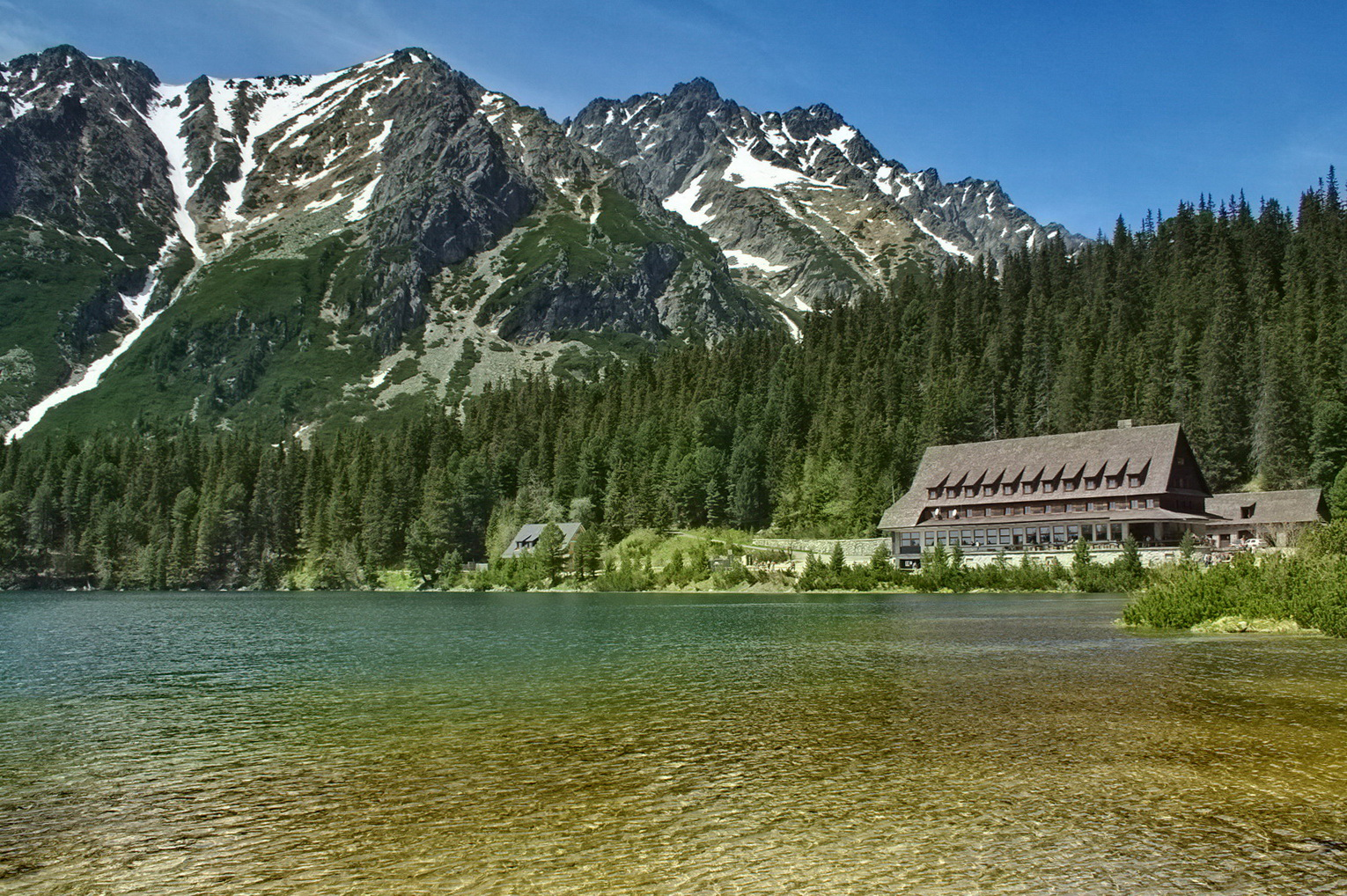
Popradské pleso in Tatra National Park, Slovakia.

| Country | Oldest (year) | Number of parks | Total area km^{2} | Percentage of country |
|---|---|---|---|---|
| Albania | 1966 | 14 | 2,106.68 | 6.7% |
| Austria | 1981 | 6 | 2,521 | 3.0% |
| Belarus | 1939 | 4 | 2,222 | 1.0% |
| Belgium | 2001 | 6 | 638.71 | 2.1% |
| Bosnia and Herzegovina | 1965 | 4 | 473 | 0.9% |
| Bulgaria | 1963 | 3 | 1,930 | 1.8% |
| Croatia | 1949 | 8 | 994 | 1.8% |
| Czech Republic | 1963 | 4 | 1,190 | 1.5% |
| Denmark (Note: Refers to mainland Denmark only (part in Europe). For Greenland, see Northeast Greenland National Park, Greenland's only national park, which was established in 1974 and is the world's largest at 971,000 km² (44.8% of Greenland's area).) | 2008 | 5 | 2,322 | 5.4% |
| Estonia | 1971 | 6 | 2,370 | 5.2% |
| Finland | 1956 | 40 | 9,892 | 2.9% |
| France (Note: Includes overseas departments (outside Europe) where there are three national parks: the 33,900 km² Guiana Amazonian Park in French Guiana, 1,054 km² Réunion National Park in Réunion and 173 km² Guadeloupe National Park in Guadeloupe.) | 1963 | 11 | 60,728 | 9.5% |
| Georgia | 1946 | 11 | 5,111 | 7.0% |
| Germany | 1970 | 16 | 10,395 | 2.7% |
| Greece | 1938 | 15 | 6,960 | 3.6% |
| Hungary | 1972 | 10 | 4,819 | 5.2% |
| Iceland | 1928 | 3 | 12,407 | 12.1% |
| Ireland | 1932 | 6 | 650 | 0.9% |
| Italy | 1922 | 25 | 15,000 | 5.0% |
| Kosovo | 1986 | 2 | 1,014.88 | 9.3% |
| Latvia | 1973 | 4 | 2,065 | 3.2% |
| Lithuania | 1974 | 5 | 1,554 | 2.4% |
| Malta | 2007 | 1 | 2.5 | 0.69% |
| Moldova | 2013 | 1 | 337 | 1% |
| Montenegro | 1952 | 5 | 1,096 | 7.9% |
| Netherlands | 1930 | 21 | 1,251 | 3.0% |
| North Macedonia | 1948 | 3 | 974 | 3.8% |
| Norway | 1962 | 47 | 24,060 | 6.3% |
| Poland | 1932 | 23 | 3,149 | 1.0% |
| Portugal | 1971 | 1 | 702 | 0.8% |
| Romania | 1935 | 14 | 3,158 | 1.3% |
| Russia | 1983 | 48 | 141,200 | 0.82% |
| Serbia | 1960 | 7 | 1,936 | 2.19% |
| Slovakia | 1949 | 9 | 3,690 | 7.5% |
| Slovenia | 1961 | 1 | 838 | 4.1% |
| Spain | 1918 | 16 | 3,845 | 0.8% |
| Sweden | 1909 | 30 | 7,199 | 1.6% |
| Switzerland | 1914 | 1 | 170 | 0.4% |
| Turkey | 1958 | 52 | 9,446 | 2.63% |
| Ukraine | 1980 | 48 | 7,020 | 1.2% |
| United Kingdom | 1951 | 15 | 19,989 | 8.2% |

Links to lists of national parks by region

- the Alps
- the Baltics
- England and Wales
- Northern Ireland
- Scotland

== North and Central America ==
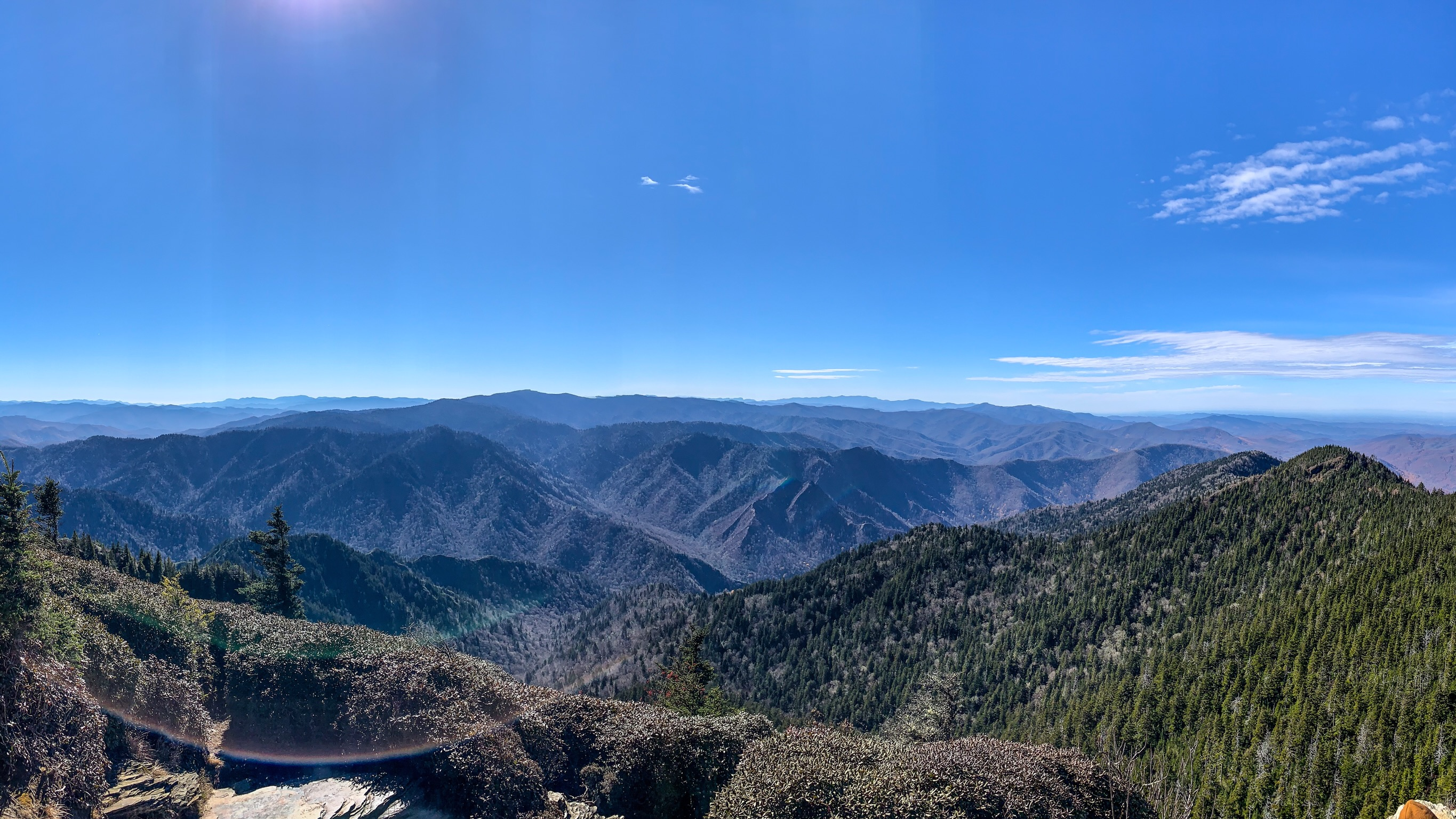
Great Smoky Mountains National Park in the United States is the most visited national park in the world.

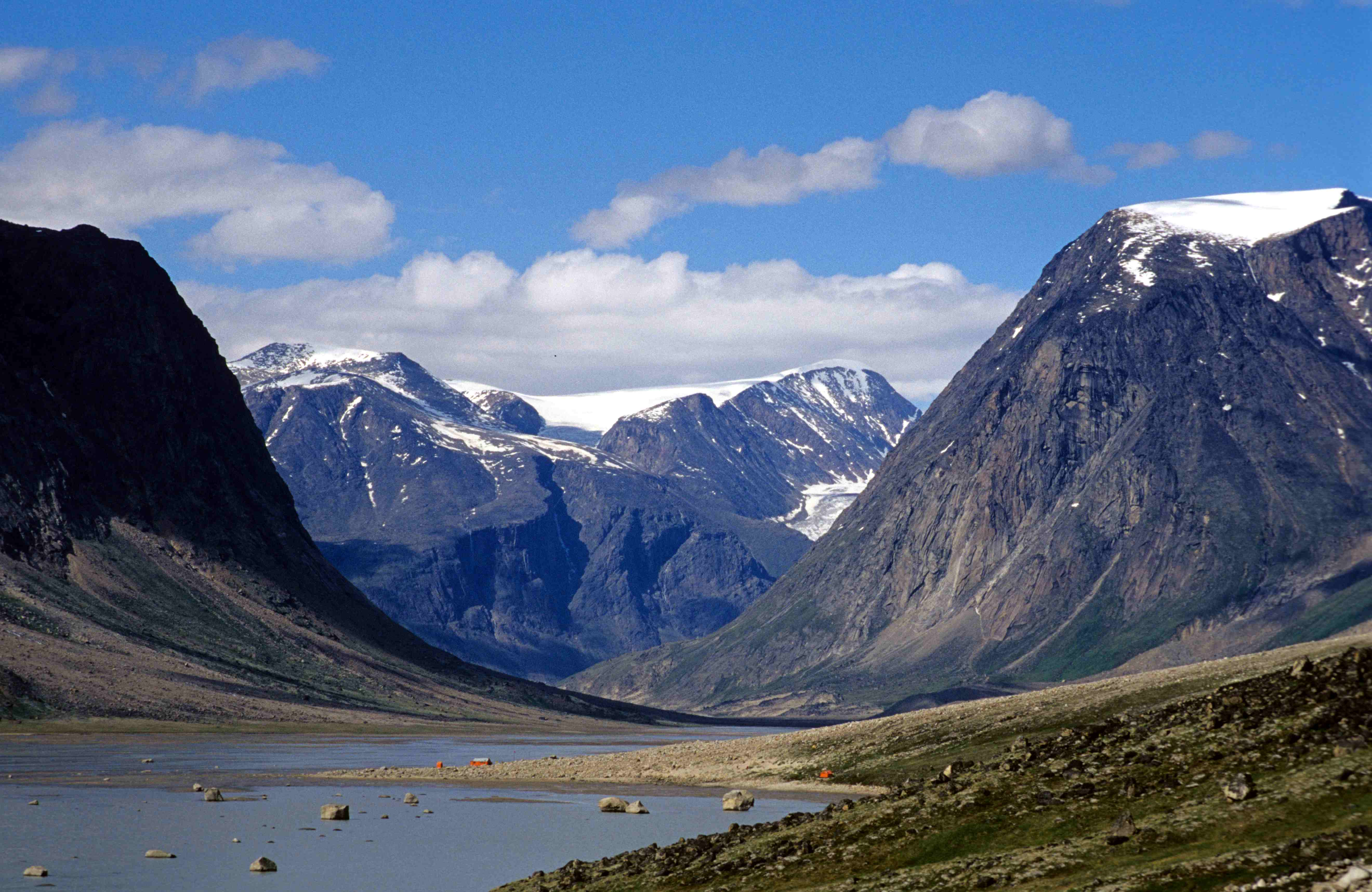
Auyuittuq National Park, Canada

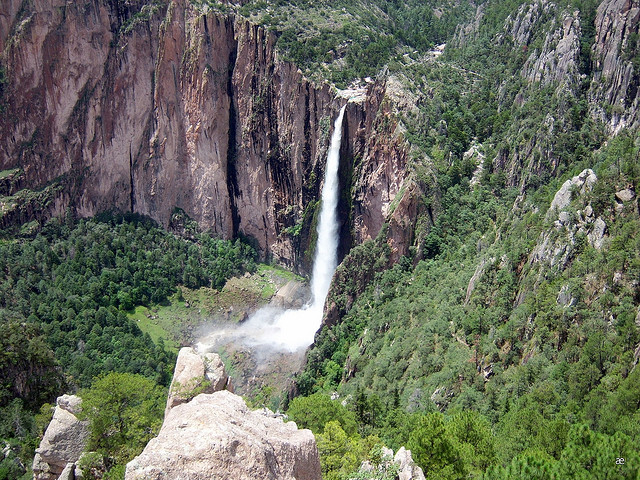
Basaseachic Falls National Park, Mexico

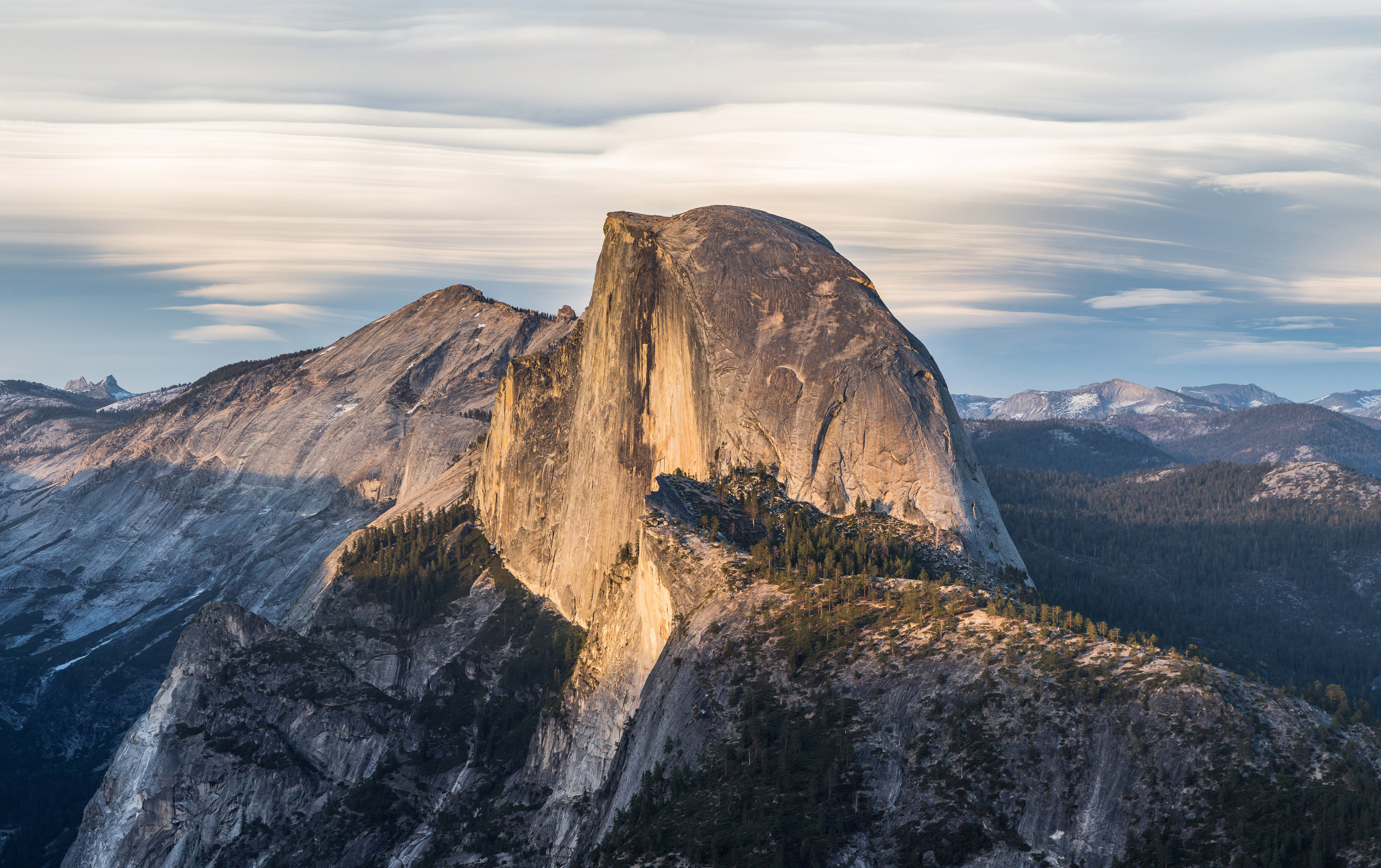
Half Dome at Yosemite National Park, United States

| Country | Oldest (year) | Number of parks | Total area km^{2} | Percentage of country |
|---|---|---|---|---|
| Antigua and Barbuda | | 6 | | |
| Aruba | | 1 | | |
| Bahamas | | 40 | | |
| Barbados | | 1 | | |
| Belize | 1986 | 18 | 1,701 | 7.4% |
| British Virgin Islands | | 14 | | |
| Canada | 1885 | 47 | 377,000 | 3.78% |
| Costa Rica | 1955 | 29 | 12,913 | 25.1% |
| Cuba | | 14 | | |
| Curacao | 1978 | 2 | 20.8 | 4.68% |
| Dominica | 1975 | 3 | 107 | 7.01% |
| Dominican Republic | 1956 | 29 | | |
| El Salvador | | 8 | | |
| Grenada | | 3 | | |
| Guatemala | 1955 | 22 | | |
| Haiti | 1983 | 16 | 88 | 0.31% |
| Honduras | | 18 | | |
| Jamaica | | 1 | | |
| Mexico | 1917 | 67 | 14,320 | 0.73% |
| Nicaragua | 1979 | 3 | 25,327 | 17.3% |
| Panama | 1966 | 16 | 12,520 | 16.57% |
| Saint Kitts & Nevis | | 5 | | |
| Saint Lucia | | 2 | | |
| Saint Vincent and the Grenadines | | 1 | | |
| Trinidad & Tobago | | 1 | | |
| Turks and Caicos Islands | | 11 | | |
| United States (excluding territories) | 1872 | 62 | 210,000 | 2.19% |
| US Virgin Islands | | 1 | | |

== South America ==
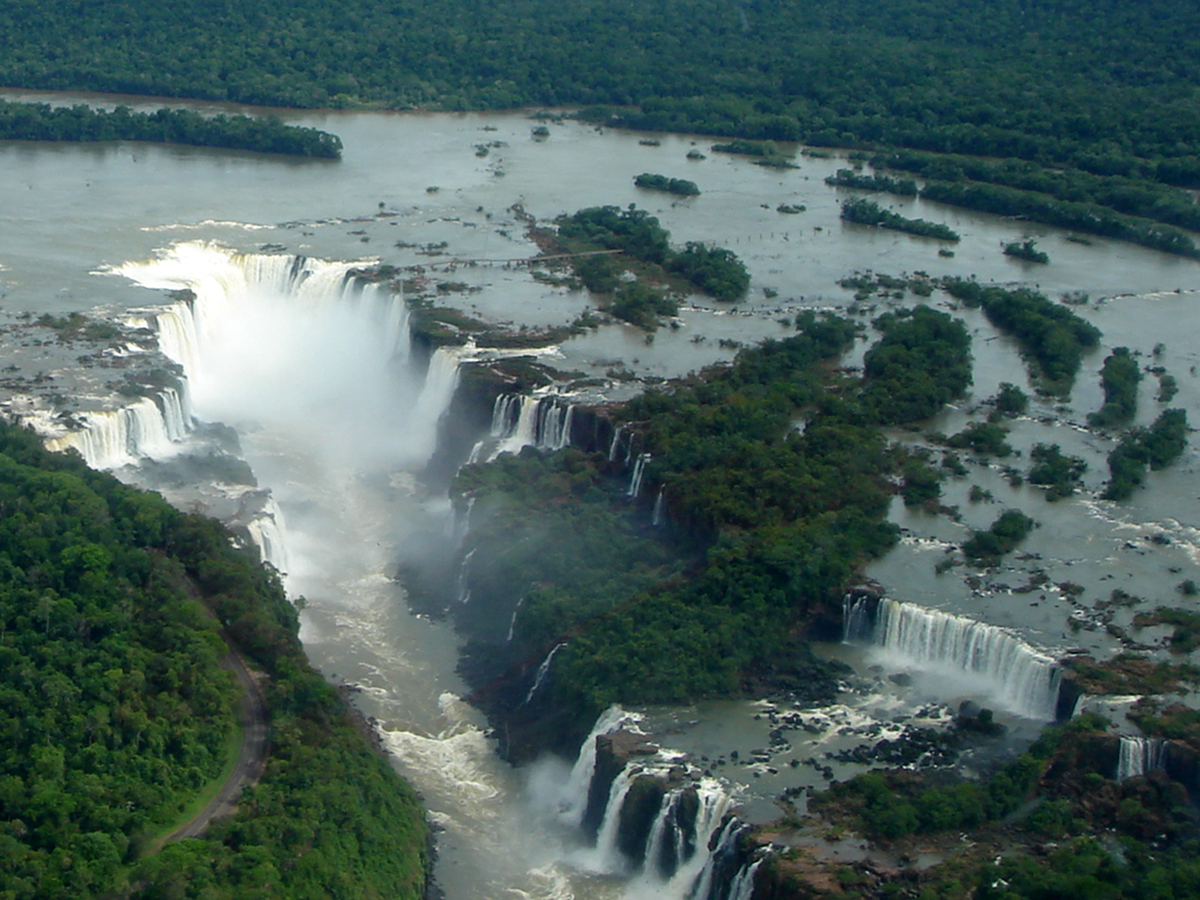
Iguazu Falls, is located on both Iguazú National Park, Argentina, and Iguaçu National Park, Brazil it is one of the Seven Natural Wonders of the World.

| Country | Oldest (year) | Number of parks | Total area km^{2} | Percentage of country |
|---|---|---|---|---|
| Argentina | 1922 | 37 | 38,452 | 1.38% |
| Bolivia | 1939 | 13 | 65,910 | 6% |
| Brazil | 1937 | 75 | 250,000 | 2.968% |
| Chile | 1926 | 46 | 146,046 | 21% |
| Colombia | 1960 | 60 | 169,545 | 12.5% |
| Ecuador | 1959 | 12 | 34,733 | 12.2% |
| Guyana | 1929 | 1 | | |
| Paraguay | 1948 | 15 | 60,662 | 14.9% |
| Peru | 1961 | 15 | 79,665 | 6.2% |
| Uruguay | 1937 | 7 | | |
| Venezuela | 1937 | 46 | 199,418 | 21.76% |

French Guiana: see France

== Oceania ==
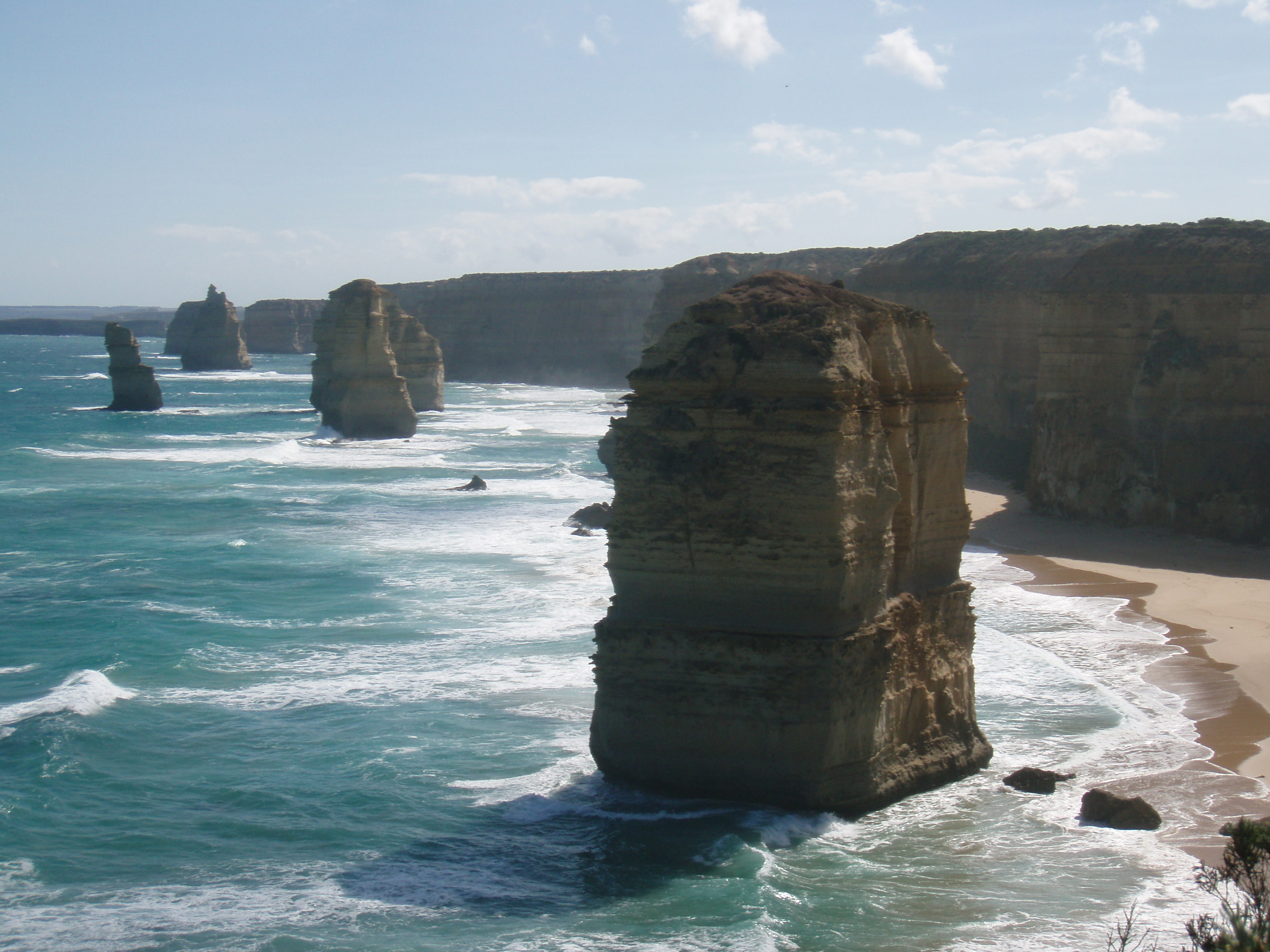
Twelve Apostles in Port Campbell National Park, Victoria, Australia.

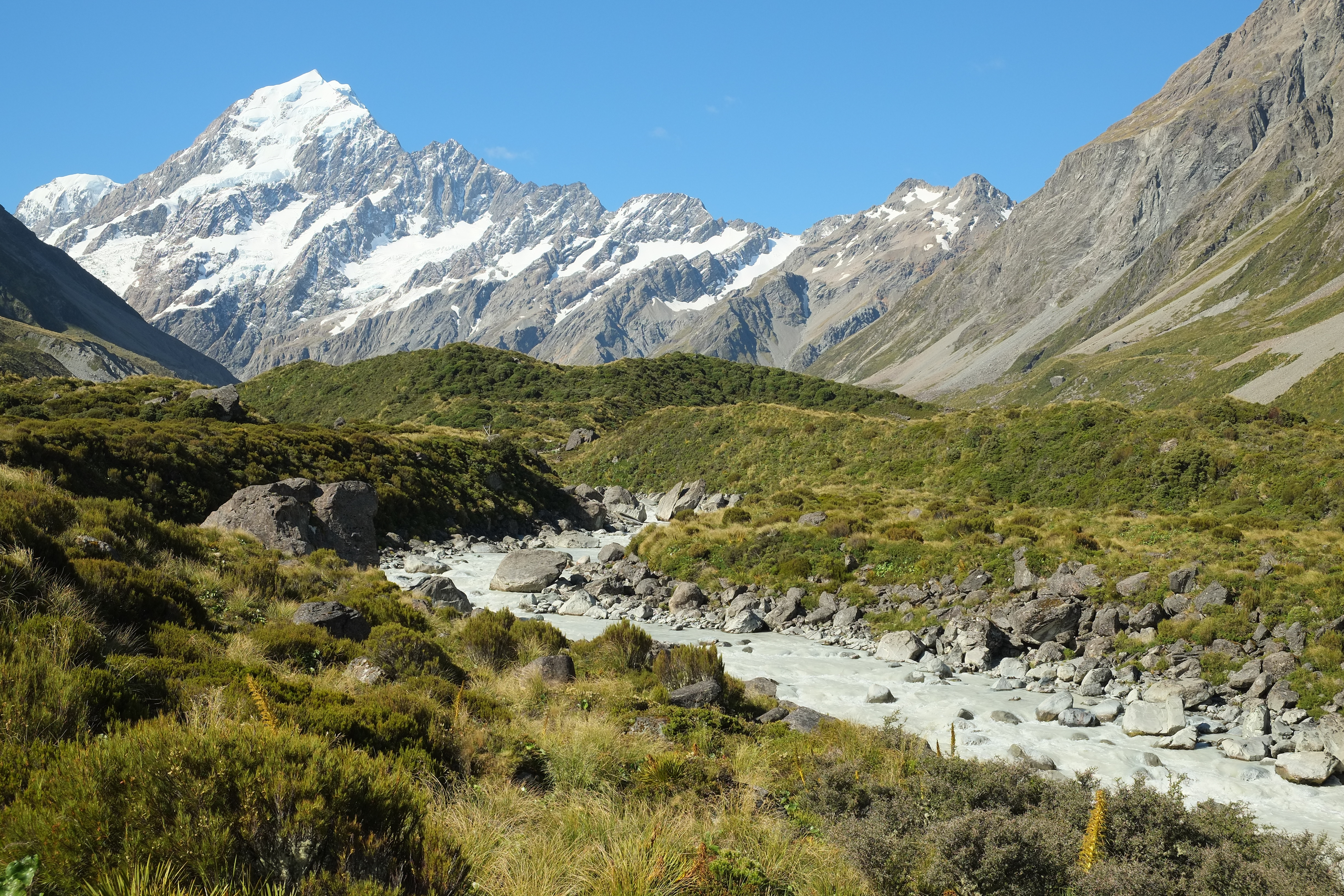
The Hooker Valley Track in Aoraki / Mount Cook National Park, New Zealand.

.

| Country | Oldest (year) | Number of parks | Total area km^{2} | Percentage of country |
|---|---|---|---|---|
| American Samoa | | 1 | | |
| Australia | 1879 | 685 | 335,062 | 4.36% |
| Cook Islands | | 1 | | |
| Fiji | 1987 | 1 | | |
| New Zealand | 1887 | 13 | 28,873 | 10.8% |
| Papua New Guinea | | 8 | | |
| Samoa | | 5 | | |
| Solomon Islands | | 1 | | |
| Tonga | 1992 | 4 | | |

Hawaii: see United States
Easter Island: see Chile

== See also ==
- List of tourist attractions
- Nature reserve
