= List of lakes of Korea =

Overview of lakes on the Korean Peninsula

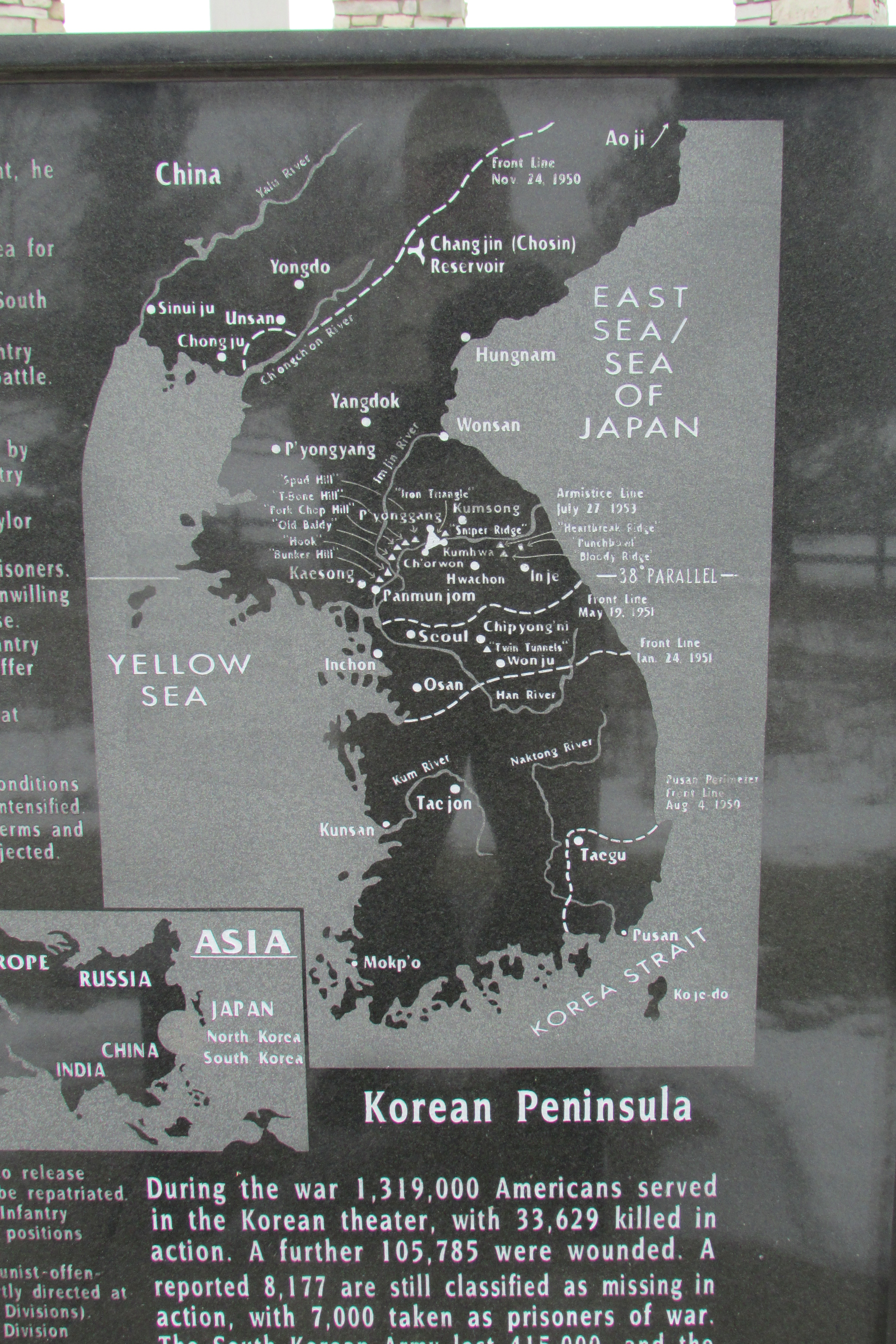
Map of Korea

Most of the lakes of Korea are artificial reservoirs. There are few natural lakes because there were little diastrophism and volcanic activities in Korea and Korea has never been covered by continental glaciers. Natural lakes include the crater lakes atop Hallasan and Paektu Mountain, Upo Wetland, and various lagoons along the coast of the Sea of Japan.

== North Korea ==
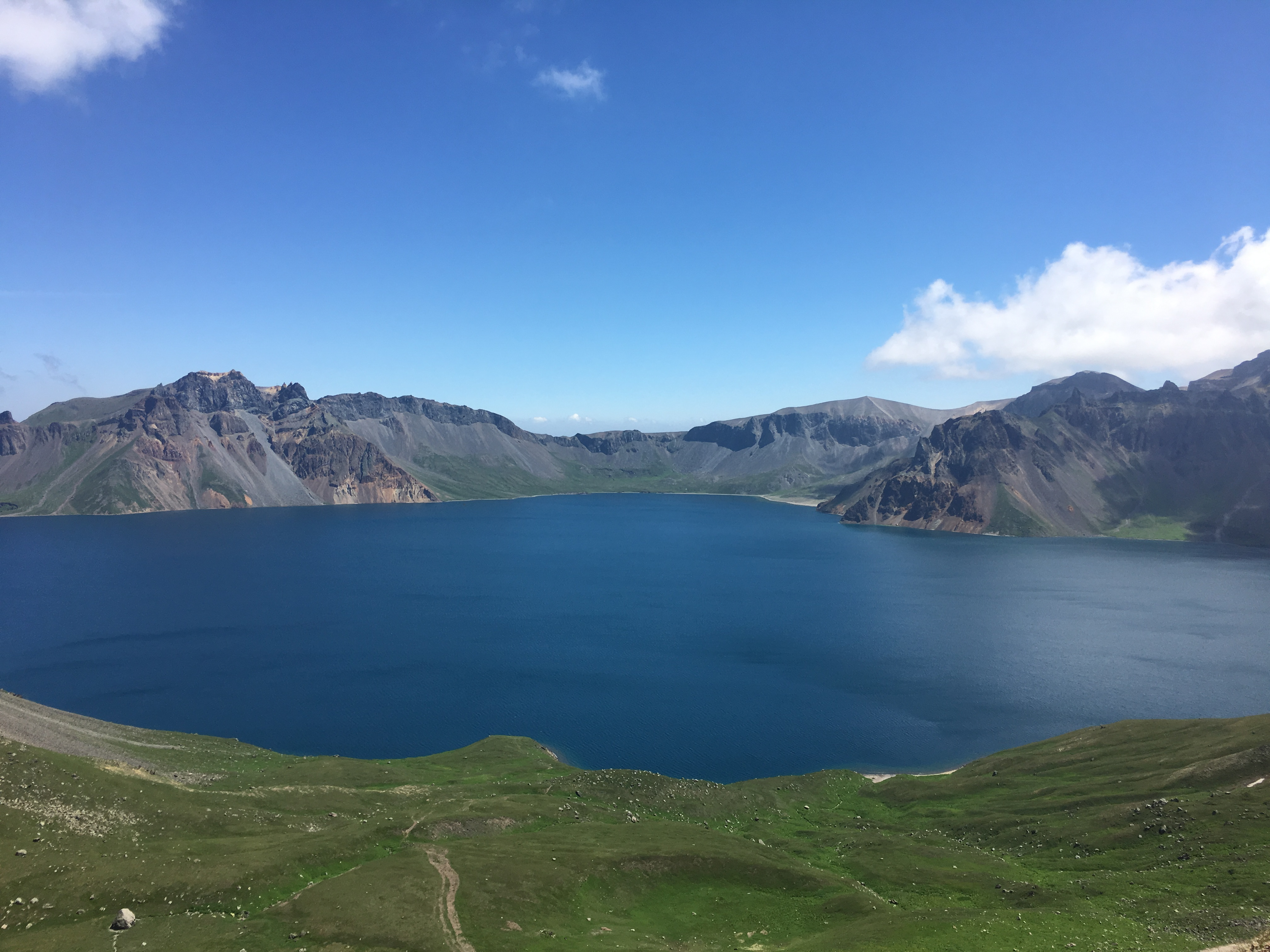
Heaven Lake

- Lake Changjin
- Heaven Lake
- Lake Pujon
- Lake Rangrim
- Lake Samilpo
- Supung Lake

== South Korea ==
- Anapji
- Andong Lake
- Chungju Lake
- Ilsan Lake
- Jinyang Lake
- Soyang Lake
- Uiam Lake
- Upo Wetland

== See also ==
- Geography of North Korea
- Geography of South Korea
- Korean Peninsula
