= Leptodactylus elenae =

Conservation status
- Least Concern (IUCN 3.1)

Scientific classification
- Kingdom: Animalia
- Phylum: Chordata
- Class: Amphibia
- Order: Anura
- Family: Leptodactylidae
- Genus: Leptodactylus
- Species: L. elenae

Binomial name
- Leptodactylus elenae Heyer, 1978

Species of amphibian

Leptodactylus elenae is a species of frogs in the family Leptodactylidae.

It is found in Argentina, Bolivia, Brazil, Paraguay, and Peru.

== Habitat ==
This terrestrial frog has been reported in Brazil's Amazonia, Pantanal, and Cerrado biomes. In the southern part of its range, it has shown some tolerance to anthropogenic disturbance, but this has not been the case in the northern part of its range. Scientists have observed the frog between 0 and 500 meters above sea level.

Scientists have reported the frog in many protected places: Parque Nacional Calilegua, Formosa Reserva Natural, Río Pilcomayo National Park, Defensores del Chaco National Park, Cerro Corá National Park, Ybycuí National Park, Ypacaraí National Park, San Rafael Managed Resource Reserve, Natural Reserve del Bosque Mbaracayú, Uruguaí Reserva de Vida Silvestre, El Bagual Private Reserve, Noel Kempff Mercado National Park, Kaa-iya del Gran Chaco, Madidi National Park, Parque Nacional Da Serra Da Bodoquena.

== Reproduction ==
This frog has young in temporary bodies of water, such as temporary ponds and flooded areas.

== Threats ==
The IUCN classifies this species as least concern of extinction.
