= Ypoá National Park =

National park

- Parque Nacional Ypoá
- IUCN category II (national park)
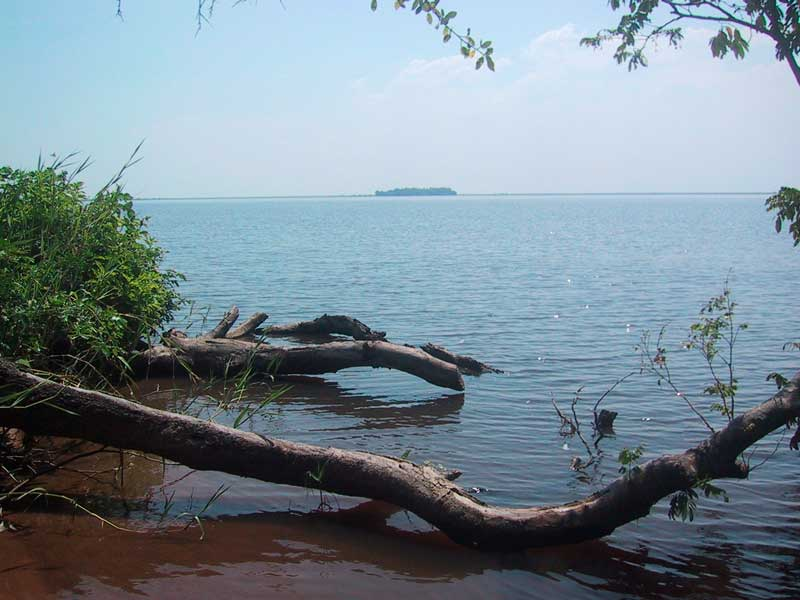
- Lake Ypoá in Ypoá National Park
- Interactive map of Ypoá National Park
- Location: Paraguarí, Central, and Ñeembucú departments, Paraguay
- Coordinates: 25°54′41″S 57°25′44″W
- Established: 1992; 34 years ago

Ramsar Wetland
- Official name: Lago Ypoá
- Designated: 7 June 1995
- Reference no.: 728

Ypoá National Park (Spanish: Parque Nacional Ypoá), encompassing Lake Ypoá, is a protected area in Paraguay. It was established by Executive Decree No. 43,681 on 29 May 1992. The park's objectives include the preservation and protection of the wetlands of Ñeembucú, along with the biodiversity of ecosystems and characteristic species. It also safeguards natural landscapes of exceptional beauty.

== Geography ==
The park lies between the departments of Paraguarí, Central, and Ñeembucú, covering portions of the districts of Caapucú, Villa Oliva, San Roque González de Santa Cruz, and Quiíndy. It has a total area of 1,000 km^{2} (390 sq mi) and is located 150 km from Asunción.

== History ==
The area has been occupied for a long time. Evidence of this can be found on the eastern side of the lake, where lines of mollusk shell middens, predominantly from the species Ampullaria and Diplodon, as well as campfire sites made by former inhabitants, are present.

== Environment ==
The vegetation in this area is closely related to the eco-region of Ñeembucú, where species such as espinillo, palo negro, ingá, lapacho, and yvyra ovi can be found, along with pacurí and al yuasy-iy. The riparian and aquatic vegetation includes camalote, caña brava, and pirí, among others.

The park's fauna is diverse, with species such as toucans, ñandú, suruku'a, inambú, mbiguá, chahá, taguatí, caburé, capybara, rabbits, monkeys, guazutí, stags, agurá, crocodiles, teja, and various snakes.

The park has been designated an Important Bird Area (IBA) by BirdLife International due to its support for significant populations of strange-tailed tyrants, ochre-breasted pipits, and chestnut seedeaters.

Additionally, the park was designated as a "Wetland of International Importance" under the Ramsar Convention on 7 June 1995.

== See also ==
- List of national parks of Paraguay
