= List of protected areas in Equatorial Guinea =

The protected areas of Equatorial Guinea include national parks, scientific reserves, natural monuments, and nature reserves. As of June 2020, protected areas covered 5,228 km^{2}, or 19% of the country's land area.

== National parks ==
(IUCN protected area category II)

- Pico Basilé National Park (330 km²)
- Monte Alén National Park (2000 km²)
- Altos de Nsork National Park (700 km²)

== Scientific reserves ==
(IUCN protected area category 1b)

- Playa Nendyi Scientific Reserve (5 km²)
- Luba Crater Scientific Reserve (510 km²)

== Natural monuments ==
(IUCN protected area category III)

- Piedra Bere Natural Monument (200 km²)
- Piedra Nzas Natural Monument (190 km²)

== Nature reserves ==
(IUCN protected area category IV)

- Annobón Nature Reserve (230 km²)
- Rio Campo Nature Reserve (330 km²)
- Punta Llende Nature Reserve (55 km²)
- Corisco and Elobeyes Nature Reserve (480 km²)
- Monte Temelón Nature Reserve (230 km²)
- Muni Estuary Nature Reserve (600 km²)

== Internationally designated areas ==
=== Ramsar sites, wetlands of international importance ===
- Annobón Island (230 km²)
- Río Ntem o Campo (330 km²)
- Muni Estuary Nature Reserve (800 km²)
