= List of national parks of North Korea =

North

This is a list of national parks in North Korea.

== List ==
- Mount Paektu (Paektusan)
- Mount Chilbo (Ch'ilbosan)
- Lake Pujon National Park
- Mount Myohyang
- Mount Kŭmgang (Kŭmgangsan / the Diamond Mountains)
- Kuwŏlsan
