= Rio Campo Natural Reserve =

Protected area of Equatorial Guinea

Coordinates: 2°00′N 9°45′E

- IUCN category IV (habitat/species management area)
- Interactive map of Rio Campo Natural Reserve

The Rio Campo Natural Reserve (Spanish: Reserva natural de Río Campo) is found in Equatorial Guinea. It was established in 2000. This site is 330 km^{2}.

It is one of the representative ecosystems and globally significant biodiversity, representing an important example of coastal forest.

It is located at an altitude of 125 meters.
