= List of national parks of Curaçao =

There are two national parks in Curacao. The oldest one was established in 1978. CARAMBI is responsible for the management of Christhoffel park and Shete Boka park.

Name	Dutch name	Photo	Location	Established	Area (km2)	Coordinates	Governing body
Christoffel National Park	Christoffelpark	Overhanging cliff near Christoffel Park cave (30833383640)	Christoffelberg (Mt Christoffel)	1978	10.4 km^{2} (4.0 sq mi)	12.3333°N 69.1167°W	CARAMBI
Shete Boka National Park	Shete Boka	Unnamed Road, Curaçao - panoramio (2)	Westpunt	1994	10.4 km^{2} (4.0 sq mi)	12.3682°N 69.1158°W	CARAMBI
