= List of protected areas of Uzbekistan =

This is a list of protected areas of Uzbekistan.

== National Parks ==
- Zaamin National Park - the oldest preserve in the country, originally created in 1926, and expanded since.
- Ugam-Chatkal National Park - established in 1992.

== Reserves ==
- Lower Amudarya State Biosphere Reserve
- Chatkal National Reserve
- Hissar National Reserve
- Kitab National Reserve
- Kyzylkum National Reserve
- Nurata National Reserve
- Surkhan National Reserve
- Zaamin National Reserve
- Zeravshan National Reserve

== Ramsar sites ==
- Aydar Arnasay Lakes System
- Lake Dengizkul

== See also ==
- List of World Heritage Sites in Uzbekistan
