= List of protected areas of Yemen =

A list of protected areas of Yemen:

- Bura Community Protected Area
- Hawf National Reserve
- Dhamar Montane Plains Mahjur Traditional Reserve
- Jabal Bura Valley Forest National Park
- Ras Isa Marine Park
- Socotra Island Protected Area
- Zuqur Islands Marine National Park
