= Protected areas of Lebanon =

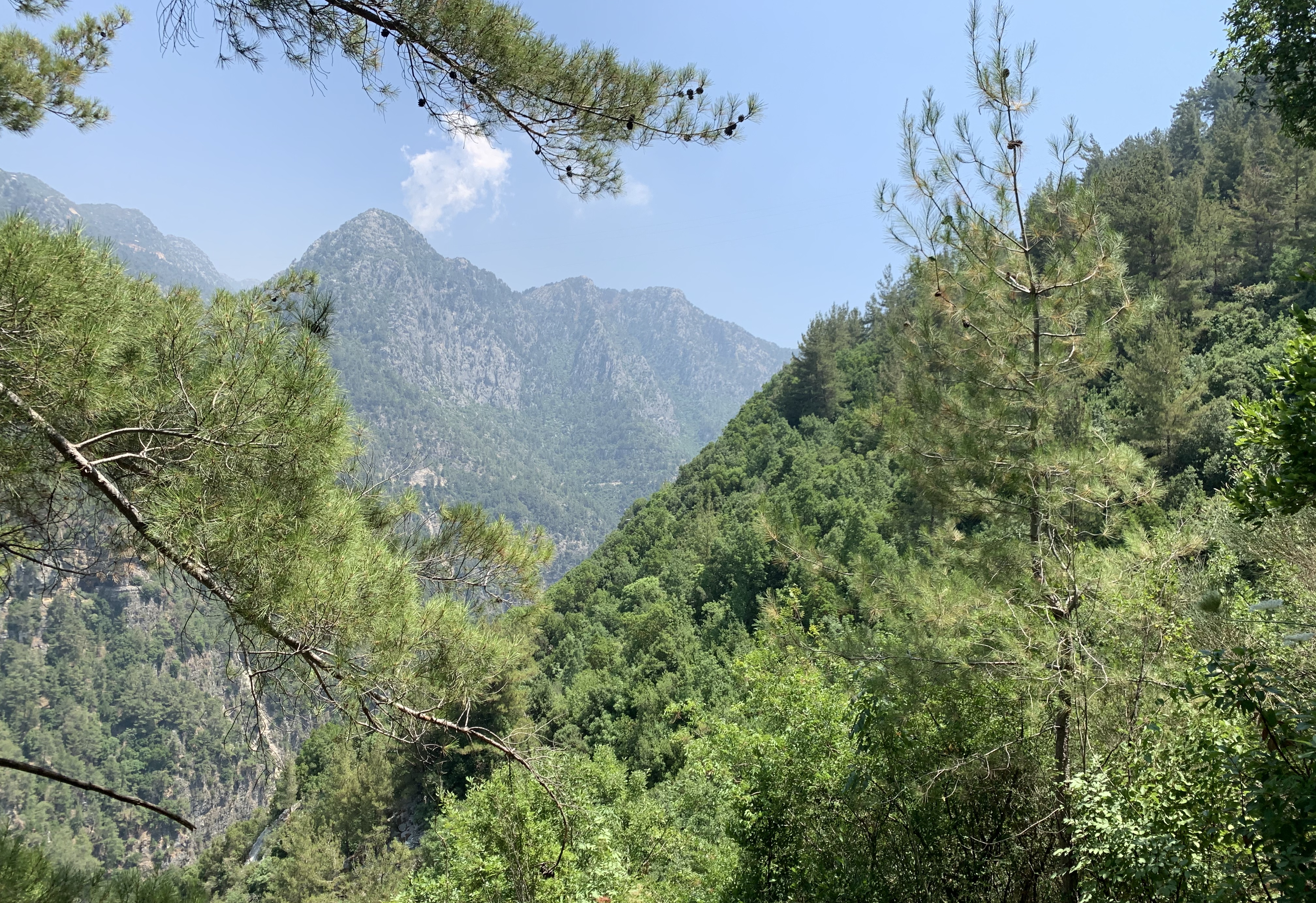
Jabal Moussa Biosphere Reserve in Lebanon

Forests cover 13.6% of Lebanon, and other wooded lands represents 11%. Since 2011, more than 600,000 trees, including cedars and other native species, have been planted throughout Lebanon as part of the Lebanon Reforestation Initiative (LRI). More reforestation efforts are needed. For example, the 40 hectares of Cedrus libani at Al Shouf Cedar Nature Reserve could be expanded to 3,000 hectares. The Friends of the Cedar Forest Committee planted 200,000 cedars, with 180,000 surviving. The Committee goal was to create a corridor connecting the cedar forests o of Bcharre, Ehden, and Tannourine with each other to create an ecosystem in order to make the forests more resilient to future environmental pressures.

Natural areas of Lebanon include:

- Aammiq Wetland, an area of marsh in the Beqaa Valley
- Al Shouf Cedar Nature Reserve, an area of cedar forest around Barouk
- Benta'ael, a national park area in the mountains above Byblos
- Horsh Ehden, a cedar forest north of Ehden
- Forest of the Cedars of God (Horsh Arz el-Rab), the remains of an ancient Lebanese cedar forest containing some of the oldest extant Cedar trees of the country.
- Jabal Rihane, a nature reserve in the Rihane mountains of south Lebanon
- Jabal Moussa Biosphere Reserve
- Mount Hermon Nature Reserve
- Palm Islands Nature Reserve, small islands near Tripoli
- Qammoua protected area, a grove of cedars, Cilicica fir and junipers in Akkar, North Lebanon
- Jaj Cedars, an area of cedar forests in the Byblos District area.
- Tyre Coast Nature Reserve, a Ramsar site in Southern Lebanon.
- Abraham River gorge, a valley in the Byblos District.
- Tannourine Cedar Reserve, a cedar forest in the mountains above Byblos.
- Wadi Jhannam, a ravine in North Lebanon.
- Ouadi Qadisha (the Holy Valley), a UNESCO's World Heritage Site consisting of steep valleys with a longstanding monastic history.
- Yammoune
