= Lake Pujon =

Lake in South Hamgyong, North Korea

Coordinates: 40°32′00″N 127°32′00″E

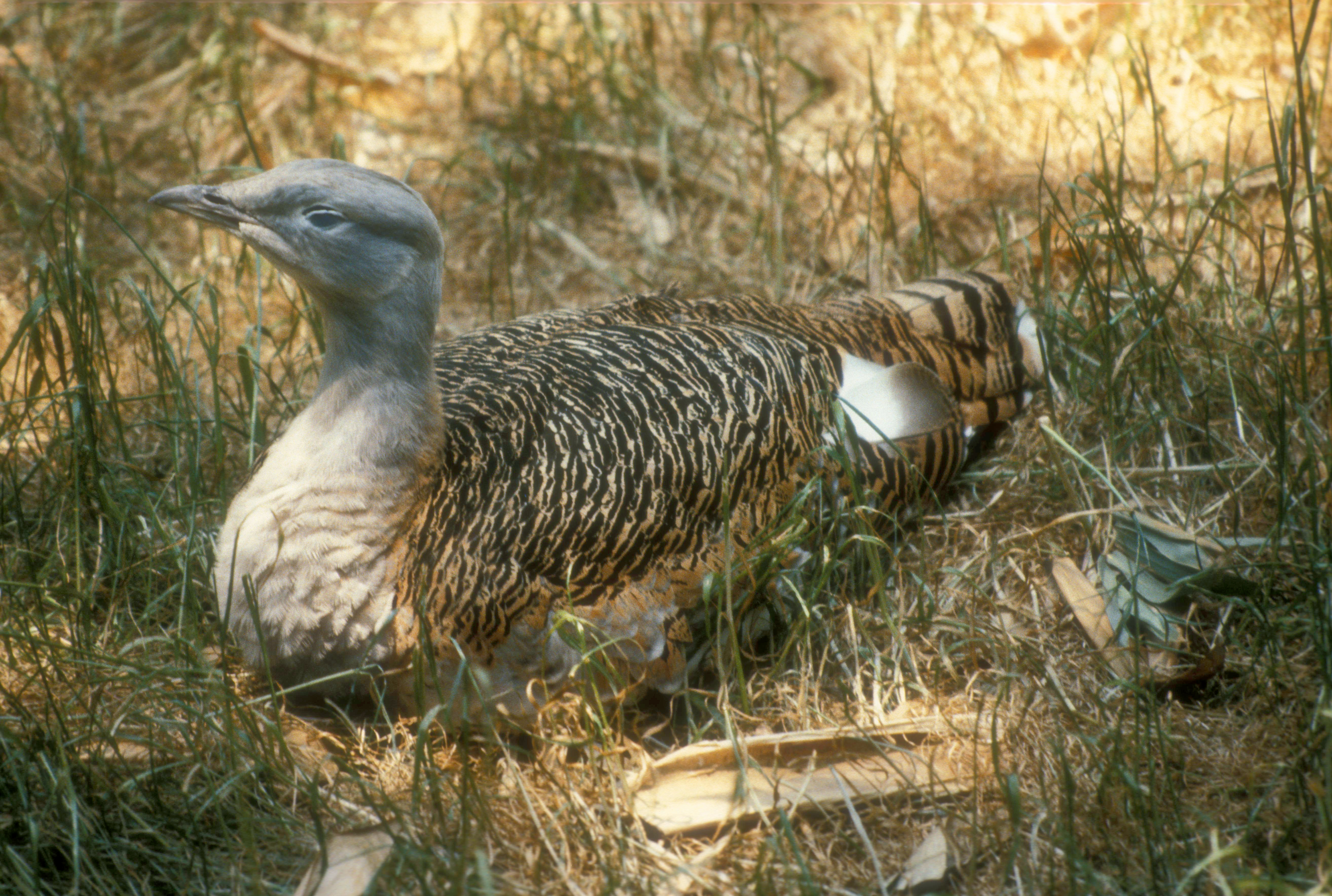
The park is an important site for great bustards

Lake Pujŏn National Park lies in the Hamgyong Mountains of northern South Hamgyong Province of North Korea at an altitude of 900–1190 m above sea level. It is the location of the Pujŏn Revolutionary Battle Site. It is a 2600 ha site comprising the freshwater Lake Puon and adjacent coniferous forest. It has been identified by BirdLife International as an Important Bird Area (IBA) because it supports a significant population of vulnerable great bustards.

== See also ==
Flocks of sheep grazing by Lake Pujon (Korea Friendship Association USA)
