= List of national parks of Paraguay =

This is a list of national parks of Paraguay.

Paraguay has 15 national parks.

- Caazapá National Park
- Cerro Cora National Park
- Defensores del Chaco National Park
- Estero Milagro National Park
- Medanos del Chaco National Park
- Nacunday National Park
- Paso Bravo National Park
- Rio Negro National Park
- San Rafael National Park
- Serrania San Luis National Park
- Teniente Agripino Enciso National Park
- Tifunqué National Park
- Vapor Cué National Park
- Ybycuí National Park
- Ypoá National Park
