= Sinon station =

Korean State Railway station

Sinon 신온

Korean name
- Hangul: 신온역
- Hanja: 新溫驛
- Revised Romanization: Sinon-yeok
- McCune–Reischauer: Sinon-yŏk

General information
- Location: Sinol-li, Taegwan-gun, North P'yŏngan; North Korea
- Coordinates: 40.2631°N 125.1761°E
- Owner: Korean State Railway
- Platforms: 2 (1 island)
- Tracks: 4

History
- Opened: 27 September 1939
- Original company: Pyongbuk Railway

Services
Preceding station	Korean State Railway	Following station
P'ungnyŏn towards Ch'ŏngsu	P'yŏngbuk Line	Taeryŏnggang towards Ch'ŏngju Ch'ŏngnyŏn
Taegwalli Terminus	Taegwalli Line	Terminus
Location

Sinon station is a railway station of the Korean State Railway in Sinol-li, Taegwan County, North P'yŏngan Province, North Korea, on P'yŏngbuk Line of the Korean State Railway. It is also the starting point of the Taegwalli Line, which serves a private station for the Workers' Party of Korea elite.

== History ==
Sinon station, originally called Ch'angp'yŏng station, was opened along with the rest of the line by the Pyongbuk Railway on 27 September 1939.
