= Pupung station =

Railway station in North Korea

Pup'ung 부풍

Korean name
- Hangul: 부풍역
- Hanja: 富豊驛
- Revised Romanization: Bupung-yeok
- McCune–Reischauer: Pup'ung-yŏk

General information
- Location: Pup'ung, Sakchu-gun, North P'yŏngan; North Korea
- Coordinates: 40.4353°N 124.9489°E
- Owner: Korean State Railway
- Platforms: 2 (1 island)
- Tracks: 5

History
- Opened: 27 September 1939
- Original company: P'yŏngbuk Railway

Services
| Preceding station | Korean State Railway | Following station |
|---|---|---|
| Ch'ŏngsu Terminus | P'yŏngbuk Line | P'anmak towards Ch'ŏngju Ch'ŏngnyŏn |
| Amrokkang Terminus | Amrokkang Line | Terminus |
| Sup'ung Terminus | Sup'ung Line | Terminus |
Location

Pup'ung station is a railway station of the Korean State Railway in Pup'ung, Sakchu County, North P'yŏngan Province, North Korea, on P'yŏngbuk Line of the Korean State Railway. It is also the starting point of the Sup'ung Line and the Amrokkang Line.

== History ==
Pup'ung station, along with the rest of the main line, was opened by the P'yŏngbuk Railway on 27 September 1939.

== Services ==
Pup'ung station is served by six pairs of commuter trains along the Ch'ongsu–Sup'ung–P'ungnyŏn route.
