= Kujang =

Kujang may refer to:

== Places ==
- Kujang County, North Pyongan province, North Korea
  - Kujang (town)
- Kujang, Odisha, India

== Other uses ==
- Kujang (weapon), a blade weapon native to the Sundanese people of West Java, Indonesia
- KRI Kujang (642), a Clurit-class fast attack craft of the Indonesian Navy

== See also ==
- Kujang Cikampek (Persero), a subsidiary of Indonesian company PT Pupuk Sriwijaya
- Bogor Raya F.C., an Indonesian football club nicknamed Kujang Warrior
