= Ryongam Line =

Railway line in North Korea

Overview
- Other name: Yongdŭng Line
- Native name: 룡암선 (龍岩線)
- Status: Operational
- Owner: Chosen Government Railway (1934–1945); Korean State Railway (since 1945)
- Locale: Kujang-gun, North P'yŏngan
- Termini: Kujang Ch'ŏngnyŏn; Ryongam
- Stations: 2

Service
- Type: Heavy rail, Freight rail

History
- Opened: 1 April 1934

Technical
- Line length: 6.4 km (4.0 mi)
- Number of tracks: Single track
- Track gauge: 1,435 mm (4 ft 8 1/2 in) standard gauge
- Electrification: 3000 V DC Catenary

- Ryongam Line
- Hangul: 룡암선
- Hanja: 龍岩線
- RR: Ryongamseon
- MR: Ryongamsŏn

The Ryongam Line is an electrified freight-only railway line of the Korean State Railway in Kujang County, North P'yŏngan Province, North Korea, running from Kujang at the junction of the Ch'ŏngnyŏn P'arwŏn, Manp'o, and P'yŏngdŏk Lines, to Ryongam.

== History ==
Originally named Yongdŭng Line, this line was opened by the Chosen Government Railway on 1 April 1934. Tongryonggul Station, 2.6 km (1.6 mi) from Kujang, was closed on 15 June 1944. Given its current name some time after 1950, the line was electrified by 1980.

== Route ==
A yellow background in the "Distance" box indicates that section of the line is not electrified.

Distance (km)		Station Name		Former Name		
Total	S2S	Transcribed	Chosŏn'gŭl (Hanja)	Transcribed	Chosŏn'gŭl (Hanja)	Connections
0.0	0.0	Kujang Ch'ŏngnyŏn	구장청년 (球場靑年)	Kujang	구장 (球場)	Ch'ŏngnyŏn P'arwŏn Line, Manp'o Line, P'yŏngdŏk Line
2.6	2.6	Tongryonggul	동룡굴 (蝀龍窟)			
6.4	3.8	Ryongam	룡암 (龍岩)	Yongdŭng	용등 (龍登)	Ryongdŭng Colliery
