= Oryong station (Manpo Line) =

Railway station in Kujang County, North Korea

Ŏryong 어룡

Korean name
- Hangul: 어룡역
- Hanja: 魚龍驛
- Revised Romanization: Eoryong-yeok
- McCune–Reischauer: Ŏryong-yŏk

General information
- Location: Kujang, North P'yŏngan Province; North Korea
- Coordinates: 39°54′19″N 126°3′41″E
- Owner: Korean State Railway
- Line: Manp'o Line

History
- Opened: 1 May 1941; 85 years ago
- Original company: Chosen Government Railway

Services
Preceding station	Korean State Railway	Following station
Sinhŭngdong towards Manp'o Ch'ŏngnyŏn	Manp'o Line	Kujang Ch'ŏngnyŏn towards Sunch'ŏn
Terminus	Ryongmun Colliery Line	Ryongmun T'an'gwang Terminus
Location

Ŏryong station is a railway station in Kujang county, North P'yŏngan province, North Korea on the Manp'o Line of the Korean State Railway; it is also the starting point of the Ryongmun Colliery Line to Ryongmun T'an'gwang.

== History ==
Ŏryong station on the Manp'o Line was opened on 1 May 1941.
