= Supung Line =

Railway line in North Korea

Sup'ung Line
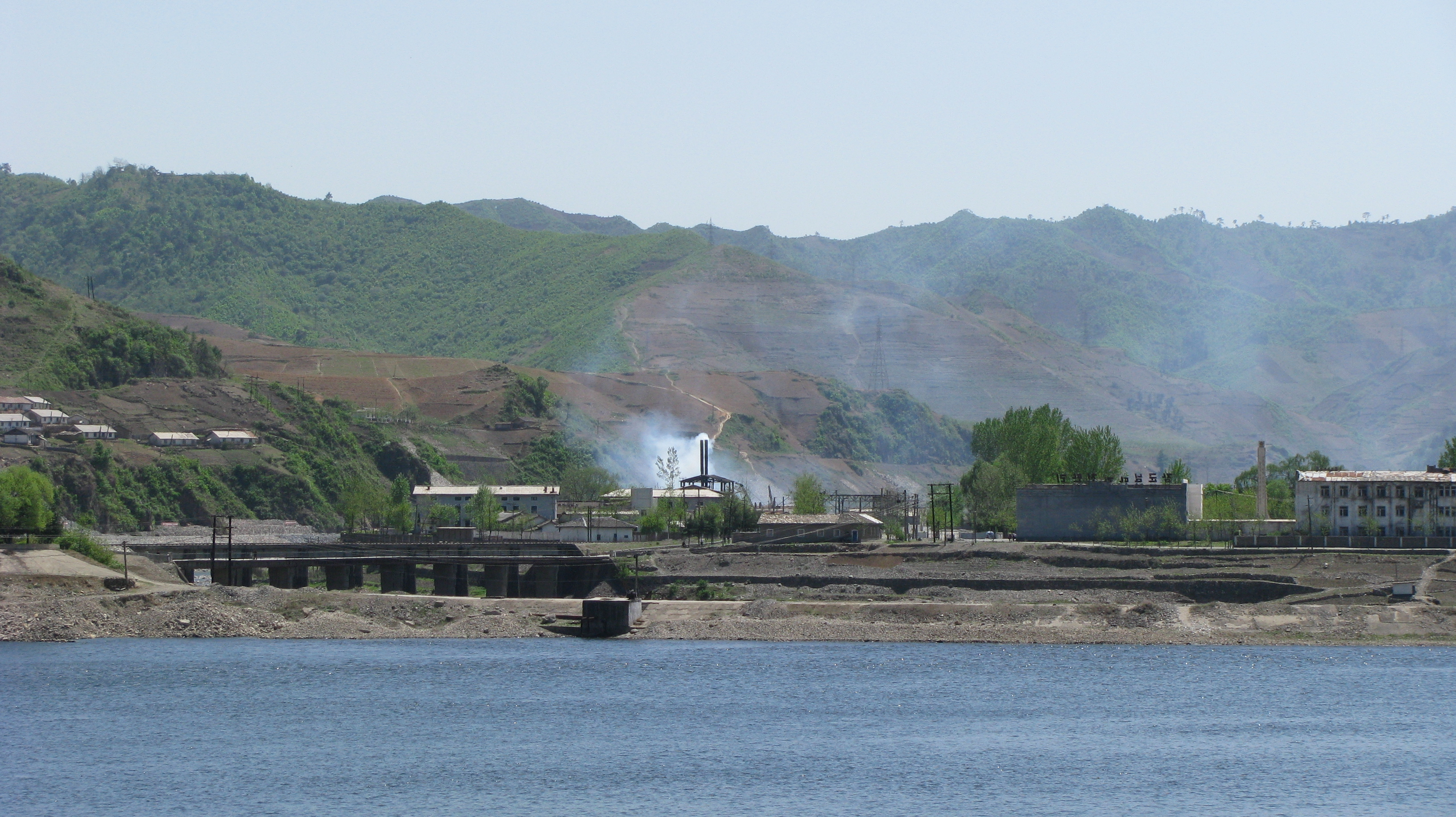
- The railway bridge at Sup'ung Station heading towards the Sup'ung Dam.

Overview
- Native name: 수풍선 (水豊線)
- Status: Operational
- Owner: P'yŏngbuk Railway (1939–1945); Korean State Railway (since 1945)
- Locale: North P'yŏngan
- Termini: Pup'ung; Sup'ung
- Stations: 2

Service
- Type: Heavy rail, Regional rail, Freight rail

History
- Opened: 27 September 1939

Technical
- Line length: 2.5 km (1.6 mi)
- Number of tracks: Single track
- Track gauge: 1,435 mm (4 ft 8 1/2 in) standard gauge
- Electrification: 3000 V DC Catenary

- Supung Line
- Hangul: 수풍선
- Hanja: 水豊線
- RR: Supungseon
- MR: Sup'ungsŏn

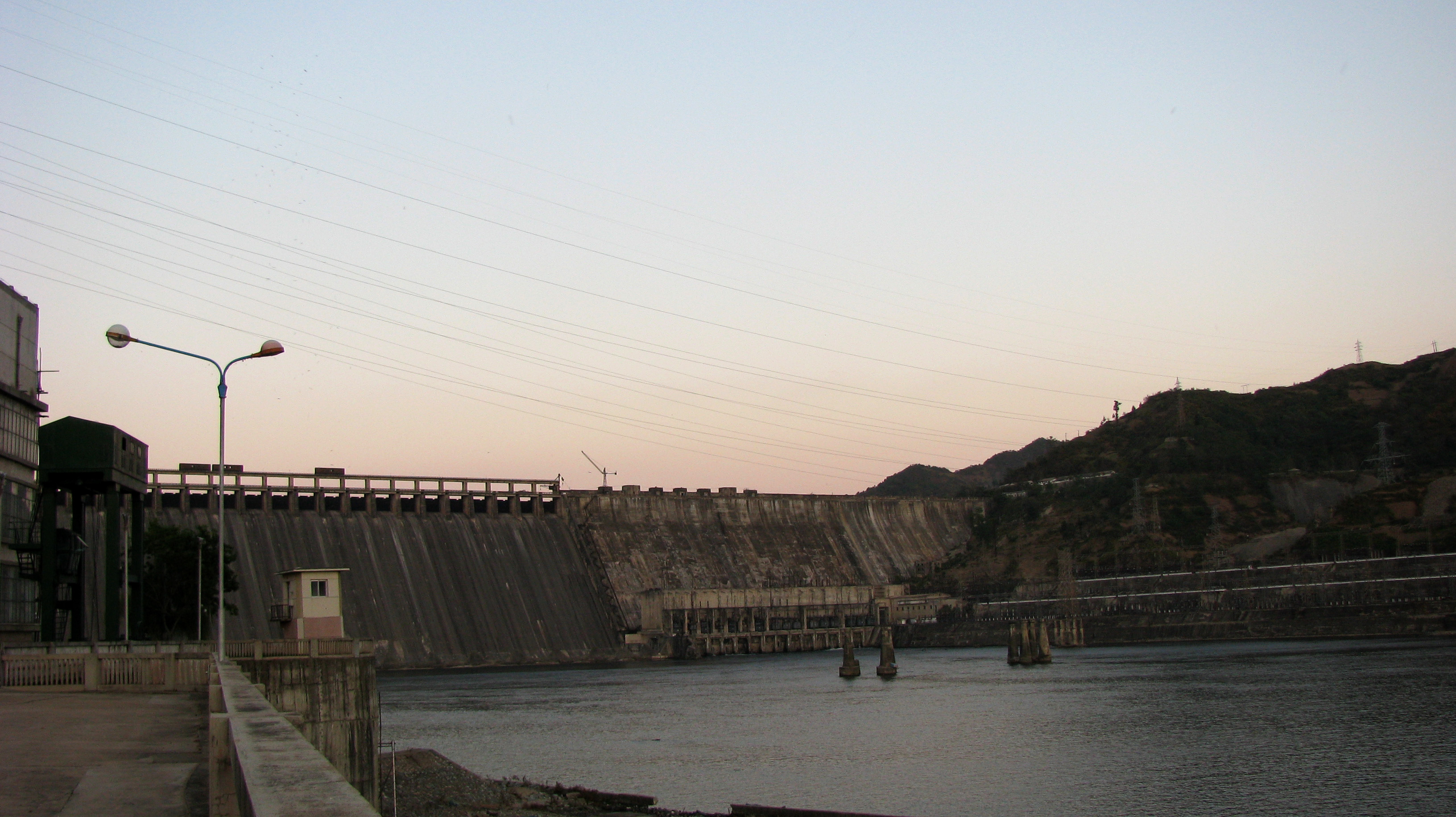
Sup'ung Dam viewed from the Chinese side; the end of the Sup'ung Line can be seen on the right.

The Sup'ung Line is an electrified railway line of the Korean State Railway in North P'yŏngan Province, North Korea, running from Pup'ung on the P'yŏngbuk Line to Sup'ung.

== History ==
The Sup'ung Line was opened along with the main line by the P'yŏngbuk Railway on 27 September 1939 to assist with the construction of the Sup'ung Dam.

Following the partition of Korea, the line fell within the Soviet zone of occupation and was nationalised, along with all other railways in the zone, by the Provisional People’s Committee for North Korea on 10 August 1946. It subsequently became part of the Korean State Railway. The electrification of the entire line was completed in 1980.

== Services ==
Sup'ung Station, the terminus of the line, is served by six pairs of commuter trains operating on the Ch'ongsu—Sup'ung—P'ungnyŏn route.

== Route ==
A yellow background in the "Distance" box indicates that section of the line is not electrified.

| Distance (km) | | Station Name | | Former Name | | |
| Total | S2S | Transcribed | Chosŏn'gŭl (Hanja) | Transcribed | Chosŏn'gŭl (Hanja) | Connections |
|---|---|---|---|---|---|---|
| 0.0 | 0.0 | Pup'ung | 부풍 (富豊) | | | Amrokkang Line, P'yŏngdŏk Line |
| 2.5 | 2.5 | Sup'ung | 수풍 (水豊) | | | |
