= Kusong station =

Railway station in Kusŏng, North Korea

Kusŏng 구성

Korean name
- Hangul: 구성역
- Hanja: 龜城驛
- Revised Romanization: Guseong-yeok
- McCune–Reischauer: Kusŏng-yŏk

General information
- Location: Yŏkchŏn-dong, Kusŏng-si, North P'yŏngan; North Korea
- Coordinates: 39.9828°N 125.2589°E
- Owner: Korean State Railway
- Platforms: 2 (1 island)
- Tracks: 7

History
- Opened: 27 September 1939
- Original company: Pyongbuk Railway

Services
Preceding station	Korean State Railway	Following station
Paegun towards Ch'ŏngsu	P'yŏngbuk Line	Panghyŏn towards Ch'ŏngju Ch'ŏngnyŏn
Terminus	Ch'ŏngnyŏn P'arwŏn Line	Ŏmihyŏn towards Kujang Ch'ŏngnyŏn
Location

Kusŏng station is a railway station of the Korean State Railway in Yŏkchŏn-dong, Kusŏng city, North P'yŏngan Province, North Korea, on the P'yŏngbuk Line of the Korean State Railway. It is also the western terminus of the Ch'ŏngnyŏn P'arwŏn Line.

== History ==
Kusŏng station, originally called P'yŏngbuk Kusŏng station, was opened along with the rest of the line by the Pyongbuk Railway on 27 September 1939.

== Services ==
Kusŏng station is served by semi-express trains 115/116 between P'yŏngyang and Ch'ŏngsu, long-distance stopping trains 200/201 between West P'yŏngyang and Ch'ŏngsu, and regional trains 795/796 between Kusŏng and Kujang Ch'ŏngnyŏn. It is also served by commuter trains on the Kusŏng—Paegun (5 pairs) and Chŏngju–Kusŏng (2 pairs) sections of the line.
