= Ryongmun Tangwang station =

Railway station in North Korea

Ryongmun Colliery 룡문탄광

Korean name
- Hangul: 룡문탄광역
- Hanja: 龍門炭鑛驛
- Revised Romanization: Ryongmuntangwang-yeok
- McCune–Reischauer: Ryongmunt'an'gwang-yŏk

General information
- Location: Ryongmul-lodongjagu, Kujang, North P'yŏngan Province; North Korea
- Coordinates: 39.8690°N 126.1064°E
- Owner: Korean State Railway
- Line: Manp'o Line

History
- Opened: 1 September 1941; 85 years ago
- Original company: Chosen Government Railway

Services
Preceding station	Korean State Railway	Following station
Ŏryŏng Terminus	Ryongmun Colliery Line	Terminus
Location

Ryongmun T'an'gwang station (Ryongmun Colliery station) is a railway station in Ryongmul-lodongjagu, Kujang county, North P'yŏngan province, North Korea. It is the terminus of the Ryongmun Colliery Line of the Korean State Railway.

== History ==
The station was opened, along with the entire Ryongmun Colliery Line, by the Chosen Government Railway on 1 September 1941.
