= 구성역 =

구성역 may refer to stations:

- Guseong Station (駒城驛), station of the subway line of Korail
- Kusong station (龜城驛), railway station in Yŏkchŏn-dong, Kusŏng city, North P'yŏngan Province, North Korea
