= Amrokkang station =

Railway station in Sakchu County, North Korea

Amrokkang 압록강

Korean name
- Hangul: 압록강역
- Hanja: 鴨綠江驛
- Revised Romanization: Amnoggang-yeok
- McCune–Reischauer: Amrokkang-yŏk

General information
- Location: Hoan, Sup'ung-rodongjagu, Sakchu-gun, North P'yŏngan; North Korea
- Coordinates: 40.4582°N 124.9693°E
- Owner: Korean State Railway
- Tracks: 2

History
- Opened: 27 September 1939
- Former names: Sup'ung Hoan 수풍호안 (水豊湖岸)
- Original company: Pyeongbuk Railway

Services
| Preceding station | Korean State Railway | Following station |
|---|---|---|
| Terminus | Amrokkang Line | Pup'ung Terminus |
Location
- Location within North Korea

Amrokkang station is a freight-only railway station of the Korean State Railway in Hoan, Sup'ung Workers' District, Sakchu County, North P'yŏngan Province, North Korea; it is the terminus of the Amrokkang Line of the Korean State Railway.

== History ==
Amrokkang station, originally called Sup'ung Hoan station, was opened along with the rest of the Amrokkang Line (then called the Sup'ung Hoan Line) by the P'yŏngbuk Railway on 30 September 1940.
