= Ryongam station =

Railway station in North Korea

Ryong'am 룡암

Korean name
- Hangul: 룡암역
- Hanja: 龍岩驛
- Revised Romanization: Ryongam-yeok
- McCune–Reischauer: Ryong'am-yŏk

General information
- Location: Ryongdŭng-rodongjagu, Kujang, North P'yŏngan Province; North Korea
- Owner: Korean State Railway
- Line: Manp'o Line

History
- Opened: 1 April 1934
- Former names: Yongdŭng
- Original company: Chosen Government Railway

Services
Preceding station	Korean State Railway	Following station
Kujang Ch'ŏngnyŏn Terminus	Ryong'am Line	Terminus
Location

Ryong'am station is a railway station in Ryongdŭng-rodongjagu, Kujang county, North P'yŏngan province, North Korea. It is the terminus of the Ryong'am Line of the Korean State Railway.

== History ==
The station, originally called Yongdŭng station, was opened on 1 April 1934 by the Chosen Government Railway, along with the rest of the Yongdŭng Line (now called Ryong'am Line).
