= Ryongmun Tangwang Line =

Railway line in North Korea

Ryongmun Colliery Line

Overview
- Other name: Ryongmun T'an'gwang Line
- Native name: 룡문탄광선 (龍門炭鑛線)
- Status: Operational
- Owner: Chosen Government Railway (1941–1945); Korean State Railway (since 1945)
- Locale: Kujang-gun, North P'yŏngan
- Termini: Ŏryong; Ryongmun Colliery
- Stations: 2

Service
- Type: Heavy rail, Regional rail, Freight rail

History
- Opened: 1 September 1941; 85 years ago

Technical
- Line length: 7.1 km (4.4 mi)
- Number of tracks: Single track
- Track gauge: 1,435 mm (4 ft 8 1/2 in) standard gauge
- Electrification: 3000 V DC Catenary

- Ryongmun Tangwang Line
- Chosŏn'gŭl: 룡문탄광선
- Hancha: 龍門炭鑛線
- Revised Romanization: Ryongmuntangwangseon
- McCune–Reischauer: Ryongmunt'an'gwangsŏn

The Ryongmun T'an'gwang Line, or Ryongmun Colliery Line is an electrified railway line of the Korean State Railway in Kujang County, North P'yŏngan Province, North Korea, running from Ŏryong on the Manp'o Line to Ryongmun Colliery.

== History ==
Ŏryong Station on the Manp'o Line was opened on 1 May 1941, when the construction of a new line to the coal mines at Ryongmun began; the line, named the Ryongmun Colliery Line, was opened by the Chosen Government Railway on 1 September 1941.

Electrification of the line was completed by 1980.

== Route ==
A yellow background in the "Distance" box indicates that section of the line is not electrified.

Distance (km)		Station Name		Former Name		
Total	S2S	Transcribed	Chosŏn'gŭl (Hanja)	Transcribed	Chosŏn'gŭl (Hanja)	Connections
0.0	0.0	Ŏryong	어룡 (魚龍)			Manp'o Line
7.1	7.1	Ryongmun T'an'gwang	룡문탄광 (龍門炭鑛)			
