= Supung station =

Railway station in North Korea

Sup'ung 수풍
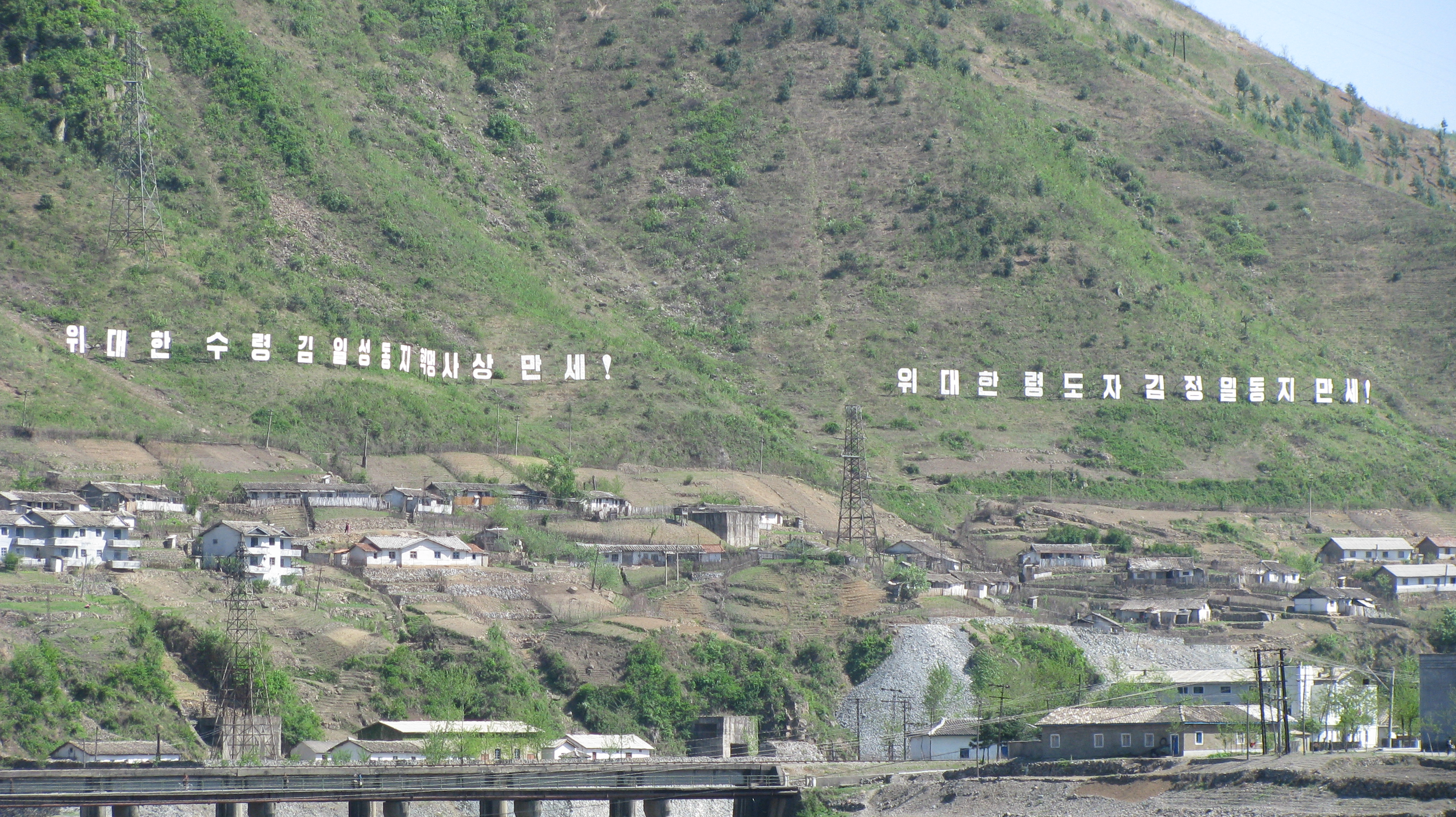
- Partial view of the railway bridge at Sup'ung station, heading towards the Sup'ung Dam

Korean name
- Hangul: 수풍역
- Hanja: 水豊驛
- Revised Romanization: Supung-yeok
- McCune–Reischauer: Sup'ung-yŏk

General information
- Location: Sup'ung-rodongjagu, Sakchu-gun, North P'yŏngan; North Korea
- Coordinates: 40.4491°N 124.9496°E
- Owner: Korean State Railway
- Platforms: 2 (1 island)
- Tracks: 3 + 1 siding

History
- Opened: 27 September 1939
- Original company: P'yŏngbuk Railway

Services
Preceding station	Korean State Railway	Following station
Terminus	Sup'ung Line	Pup'ung Terminus
Location

Sup'ung station is a railway station of the Korean State Railway in Sup'ung Workers' District, Sakchu County, North P'yŏngan Province, North Korea; it is the terminus of the Sup'ung Line of the Korean State Railway.

== History ==
Sup'ung station, along with the rest of the Sup'ung Line, was opened by the P'yŏngbuk Railway on 27 September 1939.

== Services ==
Sup'ung station is served by six pairs of commuter trains that run along the Ch'ongsu–Sup'ung–P'ungnyŏn route.
