= Taegwalli Line =

Korean State Railway line

Overview
- Native name: 대관리선 (大館里線)
- Status: Operational
- Owner: Korean State Railway
- Locale: Taegwan-gun, North P'yŏngan
- Termini: Sinon; Taegwalli
- Stations: 2

Service
- Type: Heavy rail, Passenger rail
- Operator(s): Korean State Railway

Technical
- Line length: 5.4 km (3.4 mi)
- Number of tracks: Single track
- Track gauge: 1,435 mm (4 ft 8 1/2 in) standard gauge

- Taegwalli Line
- Hangul: 대관리선
- Hanja: 大館里線
- RR: Daegwalliseon
- MR: Taegwallisŏn

The Taegwalli Line is a non-electrified railway line of the Korean State Railway in Taegwan County, North P'yŏngan Province, North Korea, running from Sinon on the P'yŏngbuk Line to Taegwalli Station, a private station for Workers' Party of Korea officials.

== Route ==
A yellow background in the "Distance" box indicates that section of the line is not electrified.

Distance (km)		Station Name		Former Name		
Total	S2S	Transcribed	Chosŏn'gŭl (Hanja)	Transcribed	Chosŏn'gŭl (Hanja)	Connections
0.0	0.0	Sinon	신온 (新溫)	Ch'angp'yŏng	창평 (昌坪)	P'yŏngdŏk Line
5.4	5.4	Taegwalli	대관리 (大館里)			Distance from junction.
