= Amrokkang Line =

Railway line in North Korea

Overview
- Other name: Sup'ung Hoan Line
- Native name: 압록강선 (鴨綠江線)
- Status: Operational
- Owner: P'yŏngbuk Railway (1940-1945); Korean State Railway (since 1945)
- Locale: North P'yŏngan
- Termini: Pup'ung; Amrokkang
- Stations: 2

Service
- Type: Heavy rail, Freight rail

History
- Opened: 30 September 1940

Technical
- Line length: 4.1 km (2.5 mi)
- Number of tracks: Single track
- Track gauge: 1,435 mm (4 ft 8 1/2 in) standard gauge

- Amrokkang Line
- Hangul: 압록강선
- Hanja: 鴨綠江線
- RR: Amnokgangseon
- MR: Amnokkangsŏn

The Amrokkang Line is a non-electrified freight-only railway line of the Korean State Railway in North P'yŏngan Province, North Korea, running from Pup'ung on the P'yŏngbuk Line to Amrokkang Station on the Yalu River.

== History ==
Originally called the Sup'ung Hoan Line, it was opened by the P'yŏngbuk Railway on 30 September 1940.

Following the partition of Korea the line was located within the Soviet zone of occupation, and was nationalised along with all the other railways in the zone by the Provisional People’s Committee for North Korea on 10 August 1946, becoming part of the Korean State Railway.

== Services ==
Logs floated down the Yalu River in log rafts are loaded onto trains at Amrokkang Station, from where they are shipped to the rest of the country.

== Route ==
A yellow background in the "Distance" box indicates that section of the line is not electrified.

Distance (km)		Station Name		Former Name		
Total	S2S	Transcribed	Chosŏn'gŭl (Hanja)	Transcribed	Chosŏn'gŭl (Hanja)	Connections
0.0	0.0	Pup'ung	부풍 (富豊)			P'yŏngbuk Line, Sup'ung Line
4.1	4.1	Amrokkang	압록강 (鴨綠江)	Sup'ung Hoan	수풍호안 (水豊湖岸)	
