= Pyongbuk Line =

Railway line in North Korea

P'yŏngbuk Line
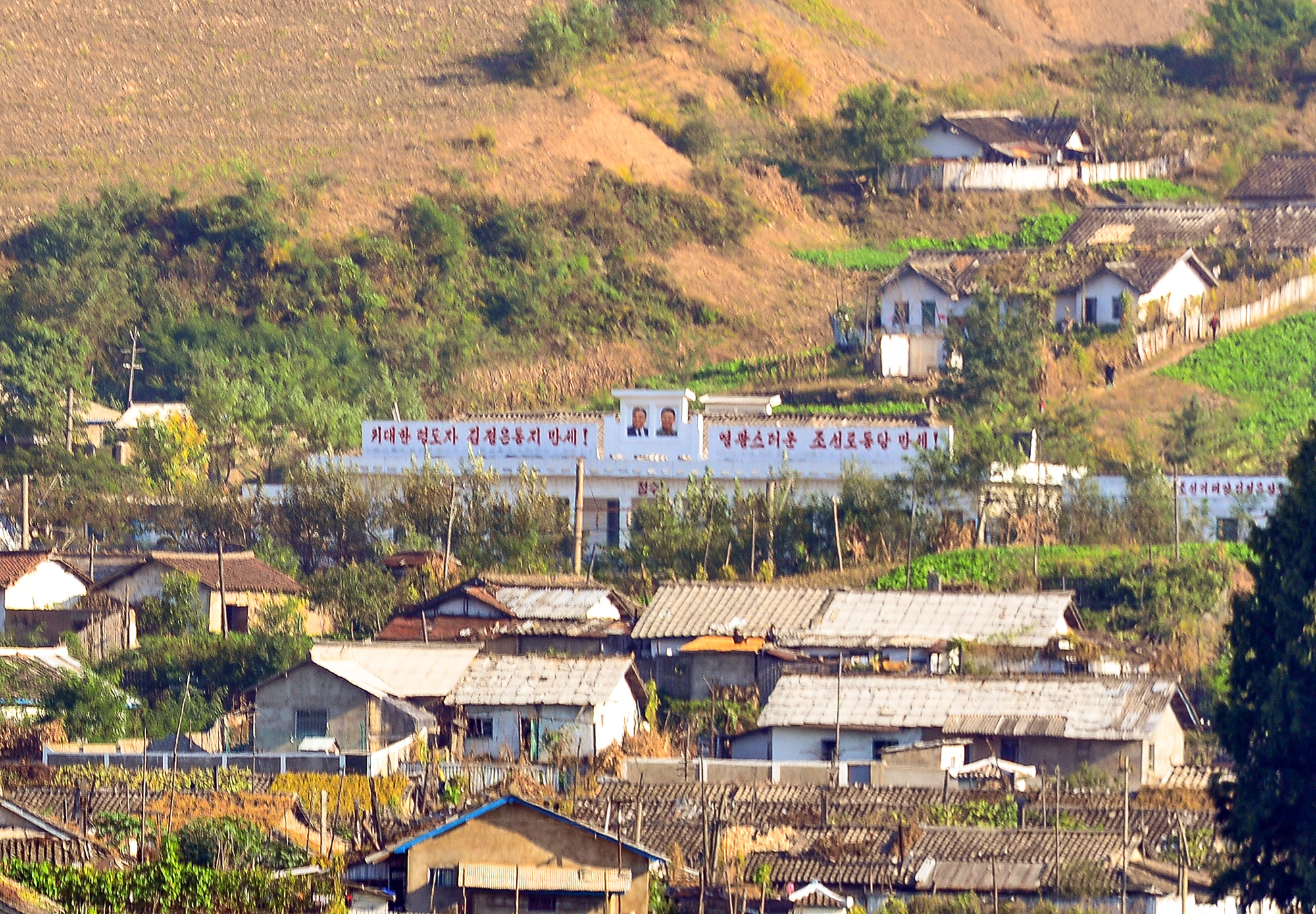
- View of Ch'ŏngsu Station

Overview
- Native name: 평북선(平北線)
- Owner: P'yŏngbuk Railway (1939–1945); Korean State Railway (since 1945)
- Locale: North P'yŏngan
- Termini: Chŏngju Ch'ŏngnyŏn; Ch'ŏngsu
- Stations: 13

Service
- Type: Heavy rail, Regional rail

History
- Opened: 27 September 1939

Technical
- Line length: 120.5 km (74.9 mi)
- Number of tracks: Single track
- Track gauge: 1,435 mm (4 ft 8 1/2 in) standard gauge
- Electrification: 3000 V DC Catenary
Route map
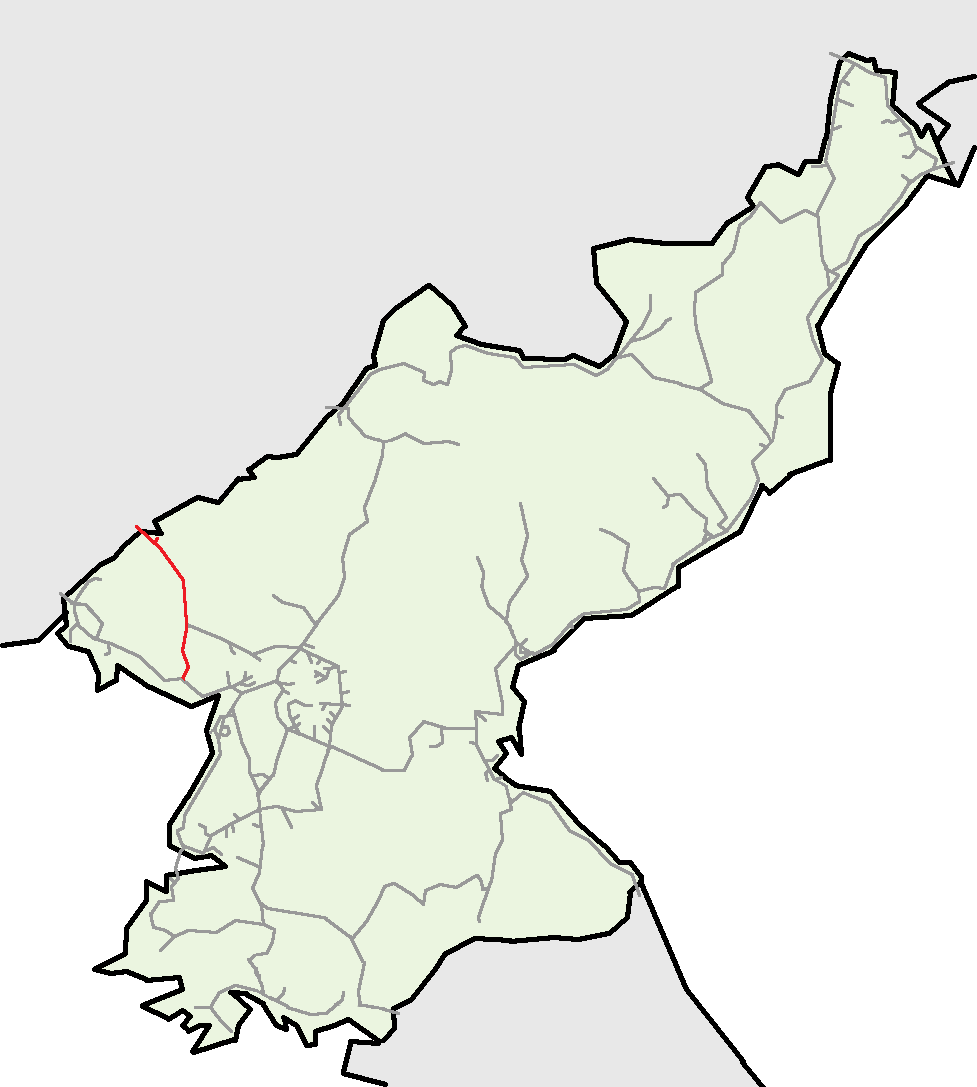

- Pyongbuk Line
- Hangul: 평북선
- Hanja: 平北線
- RR: Pyeongbukseon
- MR: P'yŏngbuksŏn

The P'yŏngbuk Line is an electrified standard-gauge secondary trunk line of the Korean State Railway in North Pyŏngan Province, North Korea, running from Chŏngju on the P'yŏngŭi Line to Ch'ŏngsu; it meets the Ch'ŏngnyŏn P'arwŏn Line at Kusŏng, and at Ch'ŏngsu, via a bridge across the Yalu River, it goes to Shanghekou, China, where it connects to China Railway's Fengshang Railway to Fenghuangcheng.

== History ==
The line was opened by the privately owned P'yŏngbuk Railway on 27 September 1939 as an industrial railway to serve the Sup'ung Hydroelectric Power Plant on the Yalu River. The Emperor of Manchukuo, Puyi, travelled along this line when he visited the Sup'ung Dam.

Following the partition of Korea the line was located within the Soviet zone of occupation, and was nationalised along with all the other railways in the zone by the Provisional People’s Committee for North Korea on 10 August 1946, becoming part of the Korean State Railway. Electrification of the entire line was completed in 1980, and at the same time, semi-automatic train control was installed on the 41.3 km (25.7 mi) section between Chŏngju and Kusŏng.

== Services ==
The line serves a variety of industries, including a textile factory in Kusŏng, a chemical factory in Ch'ŏngsu, and North Korea's largest lignite mine near P'ungnyŏn, as well as shipping large amounts of wood south from Amrokkang Station on the Yalu River. Other important commodities shipped on the line are limestone and anthracite.

There are two long-distance passenger trains that operate on the line - semi-express trains 115/116 between P'yŏngyang and Ch'ŏngsu, and local trains 200/201 between West P'yŏngyang and Ch'ŏngsu. There are also commuter trains along the Ch'ongsu—Sup'ung—P'ungnyŏn (6 pairs), Kusŏng—Paegun (5 pairs) and Chŏngju—Kusŏng (2 pairs) sections of the line.

== Route ==
A yellow background in the "Distance" box indicates that section of the line is not electrified.

Distance (km)		Station Name		Former Name		
Total	S2S	Transcribed	Chosŏn'gŭl (Hanja)	Transcribed	Chosŏn'gŭl (Hanja)	Connections
0.0	0.0	Chŏngju Ch'ŏngnyŏn	정주청년 (定州靑年)	Chŏngju	정주 (定州)	P'yŏngŭi Line
~~10.4~~	~~10.4~~	Koan	고안 (高安)			Closed
16.5	6.1	Pongmyŏng	봉명 (鳳鳴)			
28.4	11.9	Panghyŏn	방현 (方峴)			
41.2	12.8	Kusŏng	구성 (龜城)	P'yŏngbuk Kusŏng	평북구성 (平北龜城)	Ch'ŏngnyŏn P'arwŏn Line
49.0	7.8	Paegun	백운 (白雲)			
63.9	14.9	P'alyŏng	팔영 (八營)	Taean	대안 (大安)	
70.5	6.6	Taeryŏnggang	대령강 (大寧江)	Taegwan	대관 (大館)	
78.2	7.7	Sinon	신온 (新溫)	Ch'angp'yŏng	창평 (昌坪)	Taegwalli Line
91.2	13.0	P'ungnyŏn	풍년 (豊年)	Sakchu Onch'ŏn	삭주온천 (朔州溫泉)	
100.0	8.8	Sŏbu	서부 (西部)	Sakchu	삭주 (朔州)	
105.9	5.9	P'anmak	판막 (板幕)	Sinan	신안 (新安)	
113.7	7.8	Pup'ung	부풍 (富豊)			Sup'ung Line, Amrokkang Line
120.5	6.8	Ch'ŏngsu	청수 (靑水)			
		Yalu River	압록강 (鴨綠江)			DPRK−PRC border
		Shanghekou	上河口			China Railway; Fengshang Railway
