= Pungang Line =

Line of the Korean State Railway in North Korea

Pun'gang Line

Overview
- Other name: Nyŏngbyŏn Line
- Native name: 분강선 (分江線)
- Status: Operational
- Owner: Korean State Railway
- Locale: Nyŏngbyŏn-gun, North P'yŏngan
- Termini: P'arwŏn; Pun'gang
- Stations: 2

Service
- Type: Heavy rail, Regional rail, Freight rail

History
- Opened: 1965~1980

Technical
- Line length: 7.2 km (4.5 mi)
- Number of tracks: Single track
- Track gauge: 1,435 mm (4 ft 8 1/2 in) standard gauge

- Pungang Line
- Hangul: 분강선
- Hanja: 分江線
- RR: Bungangseon
- MR: Pun'gangsŏn

The Pun'gang Line, also called the Nyŏngbyŏn Line, is a non-electrified railway line of the Korean State Railway in Nyŏngbyŏn County, North P'yŏngan Province, North Korea, running from P'arwŏn on the Ch'ŏngnyŏn P'arwŏn Line to Pun'gang. This line serves the Nyŏngbyŏn Nuclear Scientific Research Centre, located just south of Pun'gang Station.

== History ==
The line was opened sometime between 1965, when a Soviet-supplied research reactor was put into service on the research centre site, and 1980, when construction of an experimental reactor was begun.

== Route ==
A yellow background in the "Distance" box indicates that section of the line is not electrified.

Distance (km)		Station Name		Former Name		
Total	S2S	Transcribed	Chosŏn'gŭl (Hanja)	Transcribed	Chosŏn'gŭl (Hanja)	Connections
0.0	0.0	P'arwŏn	팔원 (八院)			Ch'ŏngnyŏn P'arwŏn Line
7.2	7.2	Pun'gang	분강 (分江)			
