= Supung Lake =

Reservoir between North Korea and China

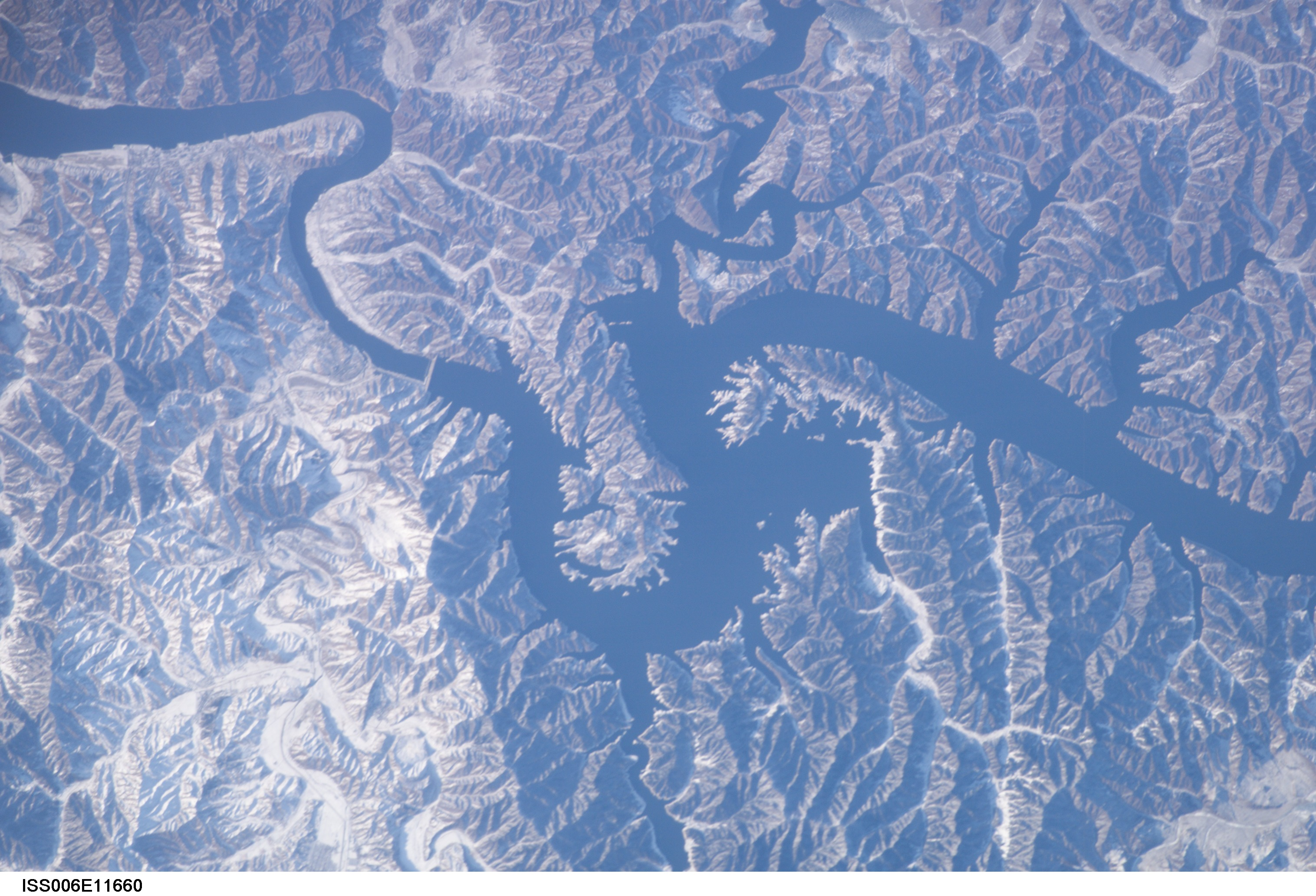
- Satellite photo of the lake (ISS)

- Location within North Korea
- Coordinates: 40°28′N 124°59′E
- Type: reservoir
- Primary inflows: Yalu River
- Basin countries: North Korea, China
- Surface area: 274 km^{2} (106 sq mi)
- Water volume: 14.6 km^{3} (3.5 cu mi)

Supung Lake (수풍저수지) is an artificial reservoir on the border between North Korea and China. The lake has been created by a damming of the Yalu River by the Sup'ung Dam, located just upstream from Sinuiju, North Korea.

== History ==
The Sup'ung Dam was built between 1937 and 1943 by the Japanese forces during the Japanese invasion of Manchuria. When it was built, the dam was on China's land, and the power station on North Korea's land. It had the capacity to power all of Korea and Manchuria in electricity.

On 19 December 1972, North Korea and China signed a protocol for the Joint Protection/Proliferation and Use of Fishery Resources (8 articles) regarding the management of the Supung Lake. Another protocol was previously signed in 1959 regarding the use of fishery in the lake, but only regional representatives had written and signed this protocol.

== Changsung Chalet ==
The Korean-style tiled-roof Changsung Chalet on the shore of the lake is the property of the Kim Il Sung/Kim Jong Il dynasty. There is supposedly a tunnel directly connecting the chalet and inland China.

== In literature ==
The South-Korean writer Ko Un wrote a poem about a man who chip away the Supung Dam for decades to " resuscitate the old (Yalu) river". The dam eventually breaks and the water is drained out of the lake, revealing the ancient tombs of the Koguryo and Palhae periods.
