= Kujang Chongnyon station =

Railway station in Kujang County, North Korea

Kujang Ch'ŏngnyŏn 구장청년

Korean name
- Hangul: 구장청년역
- Hanja: 球場青年驛
- Revised Romanization: Gujang Cheongnyeon-yeok
- McCune–Reischauer: Kujang Ch'ŏngnyŏn-yŏk

General information
- Location: Kujang-ŭp, Kujang, North P'yŏngan Province; North Korea
- Coordinates: 39.8705°N 126.0229°E
- Owner: Korean State Railway
- Lines: Manp'o Line; Ch'ŏngnyŏn P'arwŏn Line; P'yŏngdŏk Line

History
- Opened: 15 October 1933
- Original company: Chosen Government Railway

Services
Preceding station	Korean State Railway	Following station
Ramjŏn towards Manp'o Ch'ŏngnyŏn	Manp'o Line	Pongch'ŏn towards Sunch'ŏn
Terminus	Ryong'am Line	Ryongam Terminus
Muksi towards Kusŏng	Ch'ŏngnyŏn P'arwŏn Line	Terminus
Terminus	P'yŏngdŏk Line	Hamga towards P'yŏngyang
Location

Kujang Ch'ŏngnyŏn station is a railway station in Kujang-ŭp, Kujang county, North P'yŏngan province, North Korea. Located on the Manp'o Line of the Korean State Railway, it is an important junction point, being a terminus of the Ch'ŏngnyŏn P'arwŏn Line, the P'yŏngdŏk Line, and the Ryong'am Line.

== History ==
The station, originally called Kujang station, was opened on 15 October 1933 by the Chosen Government Railway, along with the rest of the third section of the Manp'o Line from Kaech'ŏn to Kujang. It received its current name after the establishment of the DPRK.

== Culture ==
The Kujang Area has big coal complexes. This rail station connects the big coal mines with the transport facilities.
