= Taegwalli station =

Railway station in North Korea

Taegwalli 대관리

Korean name
- Hangul: 대관리역
- Hanja: 大館里驛
- Revised Romanization: Daegwalli-yeok
- McCune–Reischauer: Taegwalli-yŏk

General information
- Location: Sin'an-dong, Taegwan-gun, North P'yŏngan; North Korea
- Owner: Korean State Railway
- Platforms: 1
- Tracks: 3

History
- Original company: Korean State Railway

Services
Preceding station	Korean State Railway	Following station
Terminus	Taegwalli Line	Sinon Terminus
Location

Taegwalli station is a passenger-only railway station of the Korean State Railway in Sin'an-dong, Taegwan County, North P'yŏngan Province, North Korea; it is the terminus of the Taegwalli Line of the Korean State Railway. serving a private facility for the DPRK elite.
