= Sakju County =

Coordinates: 40°23′17″N 125°02′41″E

Sakju County 삭주군
- County

Korean transcription(s)
  - Chosŏn'gŭl: 삭주군
  - Hancha: 朔州郡
  - McCune-Reischauer: Sakchu-gun
  - Revised Romanization: Sakju-gun
- Country: North Korea
- Province: North P'yŏngan
- Administrative divisions: 1 ŭp, 6 workers' districts, 18 ri

Area
  - Total: 2,807 km^{2} (1,084 sq mi)

Population (2008)
  - Total: 159,707
  - Density: 56.90/km^{2} (147.4/sq mi)

Sakju County is a kun, or county, in northern part of North P'yŏngan province, in North Korea. It lies along the Yalu River bordering the People's Republic of China to the north. Within North Korea, it borders Ch'angsŏng to the east, Ch'ŏnma and Taegwan to the south, and Ŭiju to the west.

== Geography ==
The Kangnam Mountains rise in the southeast of Sakju with its highest peak Munsan at 1046 m. The overall terrain is rugged, with only 13% of the county's area under cultivation, as compared to 80% which is forested.

== Administrative divisions ==
Sakju county is divided into 1 ŭp (town), 6 rodongjagu (workers' districts) and 18 ri (villages):

- Sakju-ŭp (삭주읍)
- Ch'ŏngsŏng-rodongjagu (청성로동자구)
- Ch'ŏngsu-rodongjagu (청수로동자구)
- Namsa-rodongjagu (남사로동자구)
- Sap'yŏng-rodongjagu (사평로동자구)
- Sup'ung-rodongjagu (수풍로동자구)
- Taedae-rodongjagu (대대로동자구)
- Chwa-ri (좌리)
- Ch'ŏn'gap-ri (천갑리)
- Ch'udae-ri (추대리)
- Kugong-ri (구곡리)
- Kŭmbu-ri (금부리)
- Naeung-ri (내옥리)
- Okkang-ri (옥강리)
- Pangsal-li (방산리)
- Pup'yŏng-ri (부평리)
- Puksa-ri (북사리)
- P'anmang-ri (판막리)
- Ryongam-ri (룡암리)
- Sanggwang-ri (상광리)
- Sinp'ung-ri (신풍리)
- Sinsŏ-ri (신서리)
- Tang'ong-ri (당옥리)
- Toryŏng-ri (도령리)
- Yŏnsang-ri (연상리)

== Climate ==
The year-round average temperature is 8.1 °C, with an average of -10.1 °C in January and 23.4 °C in August.

Climate data for Supung (1991–2020)
Month	Jan	Feb	Mar	Apr	May	Jun	Jul	Aug	Sep	Oct	Nov	Dec	Year
Mean daily maximum °C (°F)	−1.6 (29.1)	2.1 (35.8)	8.6 (47.5)	16.9 (62.4)	23.5 (74.3)	27.2 (81.0)	29.2 (84.6)	29.1 (84.4)	25.0 (77.0)	17.6 (63.7)	7.8 (46.0)	−0.4 (31.3)	15.4 (59.7)
Daily mean °C (°F)	−7.6 (18.3)	−4.1 (24.6)	2.2 (36.0)	9.9 (49.8)	16.3 (61.3)	20.8 (69.4)	24.0 (75.2)	23.7 (74.7)	18.4 (65.1)	10.9 (51.6)	2.8 (37.0)	−5.5 (22.1)	9.3 (48.7)
Mean daily minimum °C (°F)	−12.7 (9.1)	−9.5 (14.9)	−3.2 (26.2)	3.6 (38.5)	9.9 (49.8)	15.8 (60.4)	20.3 (68.5)	19.8 (67.6)	13.2 (55.8)	5.6 (42.1)	−1.8 (28.8)	−9.8 (14.4)	4.3 (39.7)
Average precipitation mm (inches)	5.3 (0.21)	17.9 (0.70)	21.7 (0.85)	49.4 (1.94)	73.1 (2.88)	111.7 (4.40)	242.4 (9.54)	251.2 (9.89)	82.3 (3.24)	62.6 (2.46)	48.0 (1.89)	14.8 (0.58)	980.4 (38.60)
Average precipitation days (≥ 0.1 mm)	3.2	4.0	4.4	6.4	7.8	9.4	11.9	11.2	6.0	6.2	6.0	5.0	81.5
Average snowy days	3.2	3.4	2.1	0.5	0.0	0.0	0.0	0.0	0.0	0.0	1.8	4.3	15.3
Average relative humidity (%)	67.5	64.4	63.4	61.5	68.7	77.3	83.5	83.5	77.5	70.7	69.8	69.7	71.5
Source: Korea Meteorological Administration

== Economy ==
Livestock farming is important to the local economy; Sakju leads the province in the number of hogs raised. In crop farming, local crops include rice, soybeans, sweet potatoes, gochu peppers, and fruit. In addition, there is a large hydroelectric power station on the Yalu at Sup'ung Dam.

== Transportation ==
The P'yŏngbuk Line of the Korean State Railway passes through the county, on its way to Chŏngju from Ch'ŏngsu (청수). The Yalu station is used for passenger and freight traffic.

== Education ==
There are eight colleges in Sakju. These include Supung Industrial College, Sakju Industrial College, and Supung Specialized College of Electricity (수풍전기단과대학).

== Military ==
Some of North Korea's chemical weapons factories are located in the city under the control of the Thirty-second Division.

== See also ==
- Geography of North Korea
- Administrative divisions of North Korea
- North Pyongan
