= Kujang (town) =

Town in North Korea

Coordinates: 39°52′N 126°02′E

- Hangul: 구장읍
- Hanja: 球場邑
- RR: Gujang-eup
- MR: Kujang-ŭp

Kujang is a town in Kujang County, North Pyongan Province, North Korea. It is near Hyangsan. The Kujang station, broadcasting the radio programme Voice of Korea, is 25 km from the town, about 100 km north of Pyongyang.
