= Sup'ung Dam =

Dam in China and North Korea

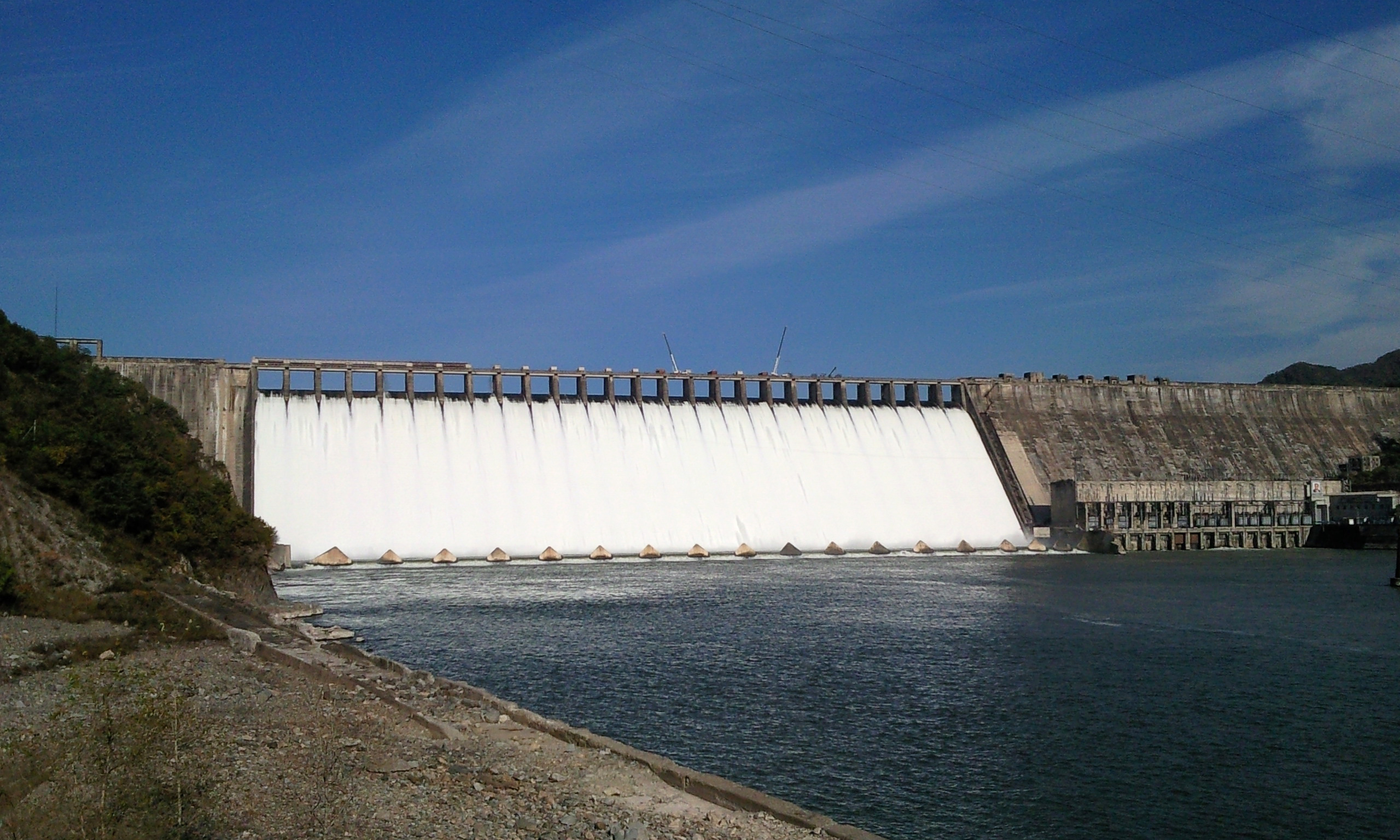

- Location within China Location within North Korea
- Country: China/North Korea
- Location: Liaoning Province/North Pyongan.
- Coordinates: 40°27′43″N 124°57′45″E
- Status: Operational
- Construction began: 1937
- Opening date: 1943

Dam and spillways
- Type of dam: Gravity
- Height: 106 m (348 ft)
- Length: 899.5 m (2,951 ft)
- Elevation at crest: 126.4 m (415 ft)
- Spillway type: Main: 26 x sluice gates Auxiliary: 16 x sluice gates
- Spillway capacity: Main: 37,650 m^{3}/s (1,329,597 cu ft/s); Auxiliary: 17,046 m^{3}/s (601,974 cu ft/s)

Reservoir
- Creates: Supung Lake
- Total capacity: 14,600,000,000 m^{3} (11,836,413 acre⋅ft)
- Active capacity: 7,900,000,000 m^{3} (6,404,634 acre⋅ft)
- Inactive capacity: 4,180,000,000 m^{3} (3,388,781 acre⋅ft)
- Catchment area: 52,912 km^{2} (20,429 sq mi)
- Surface area: 274 km^{2} (106 sq mi)
- Normal elevation: 123 m (404 ft)

Power Station
- Operator: Korea-China Hydroelectric Co
- Commission date: 1941
- Hydraulic head: 77 m (253 ft)
- Turbines: 6 x 105 MW Francis-type; 2 x 67.5 MW Francis-type
- Installed capacity: 765 MW

The Sup'ung Dam (traditional Chinese: 水豐水庫; simplified Chinese: 水丰水库; Korean: 수풍댐(水豊댐)), also referred to as the Shuifeng Dam and originally the Suihō Dam, is a gravity dam on the Yalu River between Kuandian Manchu Autonomous County, Liaoning Province in China and Sakju County, North Pyongan Province in North Korea. The reservoir is called Supung Lake. The dam was constructed by the Japanese between 1937 and 1943 in order to generate electricity and has been repaired and renovated several times throughout the years, mainly due to damage from the Korean War and spillway damage from flooding.

During the Korean War, the dam was bombed by the United Nations Command three separate times in order to disrupt power generation for the North Koreans. At the time of its completion, the dam was the largest in Asia, and power station was third-largest (after Hoover Dam and Wilson Dam) hydroelectric power station in the world. It is still the largest hydroelectric power station on the Yalu (Korean: Amnok) River. Power produced at the dam's main 630 MW power station is evenly shared between China and North Korea.

The dam is featured on the national emblem of North Korea.

== Background ==
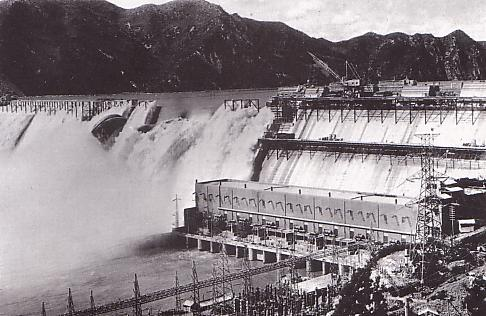
Flooding of the dam's spillway while still under construction

In 1937, during Japan's colonization of Korea, the Yalu Hydroelectric Company was established and in the same year construction began on the dam, with the Pyeongbuk Railway opening a rail line in 1939 to assist with the construction. In 1941, the dam was complete with two 100 MW generators operational, and the emperor of Manchukuo, Puyi, visited the dam. Four more generators were later operational in 1943. The seventh generator was German-made and not delivered due to shipping difficulties during World War II. At the time of its completion, the dam was the largest in Asia and third largest in the world. Power from the dam was used throughout the Korean peninsula and southern Manchuria (Manchukuo at the time). After World War II, in 1947, the Soviet Union occupied the area, and dismantled and carried three of the seven generators to the Irtysh River dam in Kazakhstan. They were later re-installed during the 1950s.

=== Korean War attacks ===
The dam's power station and transformer yard were targeted by the United Nations Command three times during the Korean War in order to disrupt power supply. Between 23 and 24 June 1952, the dam was attacked by 250 bombers and fighters, dropping 90 tons of munitions on the power station, transformer yard and auxiliary facilities. The power station was destroyed but the dam left intact. After intelligence indicated it may have been partially operational again, the power station was again targeted and disabled on 12 September 1952 by B-29 bombers. By 1 February 1953, it was believed that two generators had been repaired and were operational once again. This resulted in a third raid on the dam on 15 February which left the power station inoperable once again.

=== Repairs and renovations ===
Throughout the dam's history, it underwent several renovations and repairs. Flooding in 1946 damaged the stilling basin at the toe of the dam and destroyed its spillway, requiring repairs the next year. Between September 1949 and April 1950, in a second repair, the spillway and plunge pool were renovated. Between 1955 and 1958, permanent post-war repairs were made to the dam and power station. The generators removed by the Soviets were replaced and the installed capacity of the power station upgraded to 630 MW. In 1983, China began constructing an additional power station just downstream of the dam on their side of the river with two 67.5 MW generators. The first was commissioned in 1987 and the second in 1988. The most recent renovation occurred between 2009 and 2011 in order to improve the function of the dam's spillways. The US$24.5 million renovation was funded by State Grid Corporation of China.

== Design ==
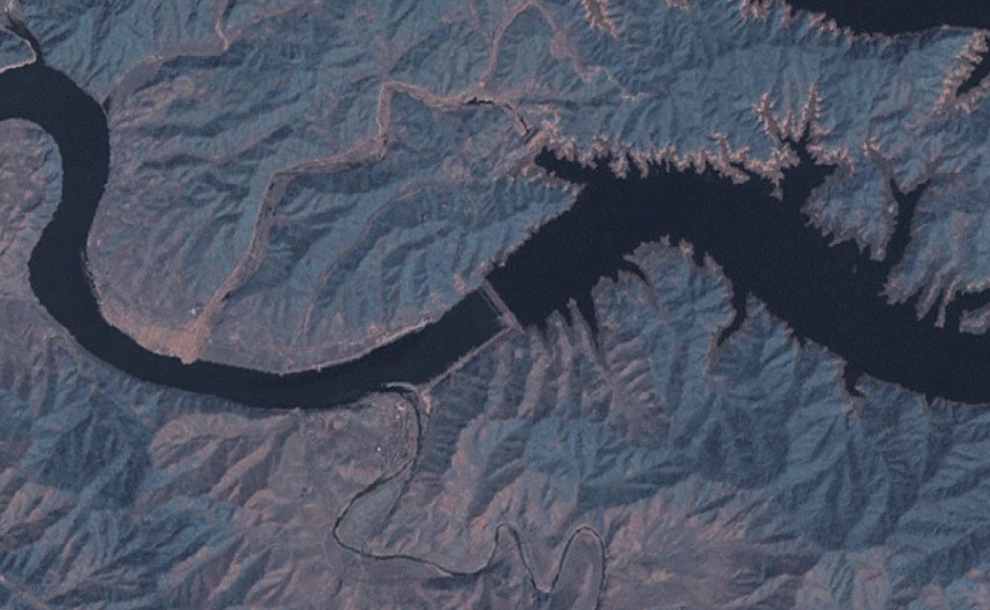
The dam seen from a satellite.

The Supung is a 106 m (348 ft) tall and 899.5 m (2,951 ft) long concrete gravity dam with a crest elevation of 126.4 m (415 ft). The dam's spillway consists of 26 sluice gates with a maximum discharge capacity of 37,650 m^{3}/s (1,329,597 cu ft/s). An auxiliary spillway 1.7 km (1 mi) north of the dam consists of 16 sluice gates and has a maximum discharge capacity of 17,046 m^{3}/s (601,974 cu ft/s). The dam's reservoir has a capacity of 14,600,000,000 m^{3} (11,836,413 acre⋅ft) of which 7,900,000,000 m^{3} (6,404,634 acre⋅ft) is active (or "useful") for power generation. The dam sits at the head of a 52,912 km^{2} (20,429 sq mi) catchment area and its reservoir has a surface area of 274 km^{2} (106 sq mi). The original power station at the base of the dam contains six 105 MW Francis turbine-generators which are afforded an average hydraulic head of 77 m (253 ft). The additional power station on China's side contains two 67.5 MW Francis turbine generators. The total installed capacity of the dam's power stations is 765 MW.

== See also ==
- List of dams and reservoirs in China
- Emblem of North Korea
- Hwacheon Dam
