= Chongnyon Parwon Line =

Railway line in North Korea

Ch'ŏngnyŏn P'arwon Line

Overview
- Other name(s): Tŏkp'al Line
- Native name: 청년팔원선(靑年八院線)
- Status: Operational
- Owner: Korean State Railway
- Locale: North P'yŏngan
- Termini: Kujang Ch'ŏngnyŏn; Kusŏng
- Stations: 11

Service
- Type: Heavy rail, Passenger/Freight rail Regional rail
- Operator(s): Korean State Railway

History
- Opened: 1953 (Kujang–P'arwŏn); 1976 (P'arwŏn–Kusŏng)

Technical
- Line length: 94 km (58 mi)
- Number of tracks: Single track
- Track gauge: 1,435 mm (4 ft 8 1/2 in) standard gauge
Route map
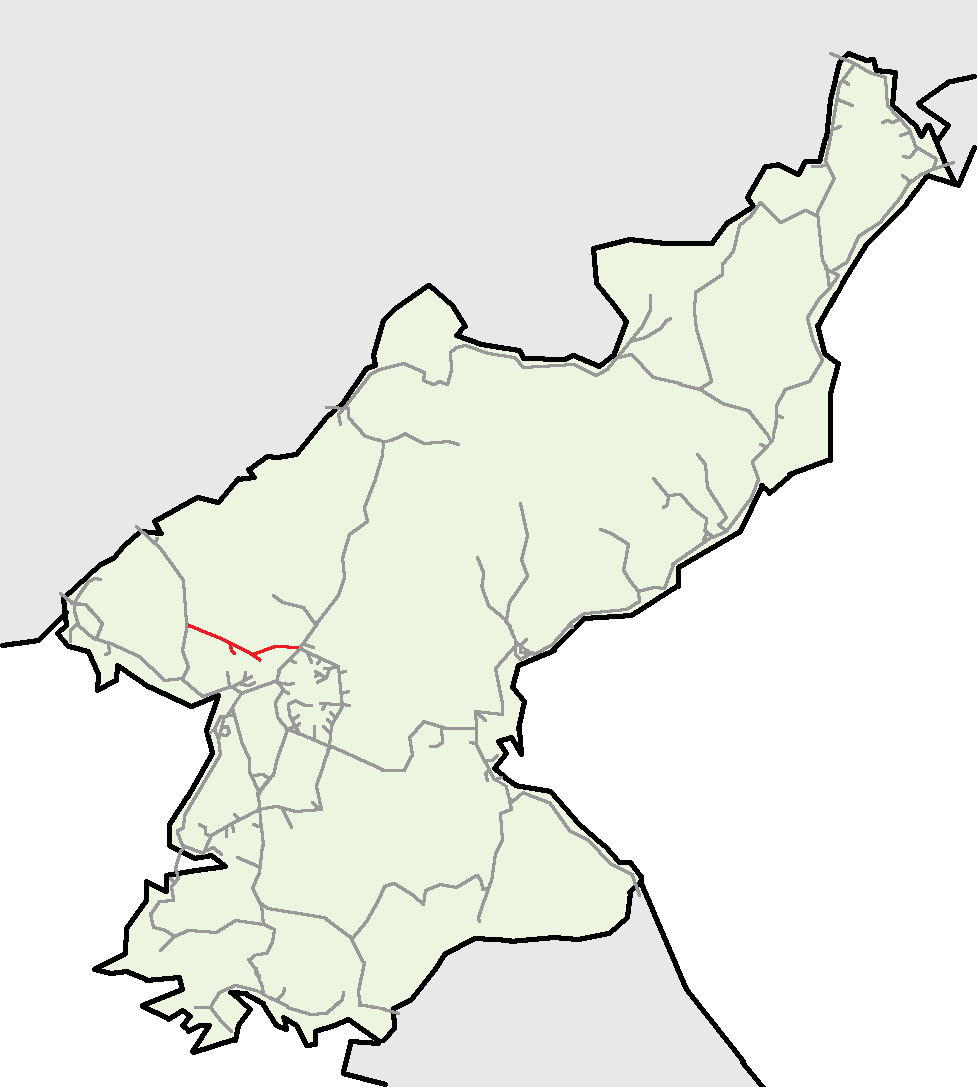

- Chongnyon Parwon Line
- Chosŏn'gŭl: 청년팔원선
- Hancha: 靑年八院線
- Revised Romanization: Cheongnyeon Parwon-seon
- McCune–Reischauer: Ch'ŏngnyŏn P'arwŏn-sŏn

The Ch'ŏngnyŏn P'arwŏn Line is a non-electrified standard-gauge secondary railway line of the Korean State Railway in North P'yŏngan Province, North Korea, running from Kujang on the Manp'o and P'yŏngdŏk Lines to Kusŏng on the P'yŏngbuk Line.

This line serves the Nyŏngbyŏn Nuclear Scientific Research Centre via the Pun'gang Line, which joins the mainline at P'arwŏn.

== History ==
A line from Tŏkch'ŏn to P'arwŏn had been planned already in the 1940s by the West Chosen Central Railway, after receiving permission from the Railway Bureau of the Government-General of Korea in 1940 to extend its line beyond Tŏkch'ŏn. However, by the end of the war, construction had been completed only as far as Changsangri (today on the Changsang Line), although work had begun on the line towards Kujang; it was only in 1953 after the end of the Korean War that the Tŏkp'al Line to P'arwŏn (the line's name came from the two termini, Tŏkch'ŏn and P'alwŏn) via Kujang was finally completed. The line was then extended further, reaching Kusŏng in 1976. Although by then the line ran Kujang–Kusŏng and the Tŏkch'ŏn–Kujang section had been made part of the P'yŏngdŏk Line, it retained the "Tŏkp'al Line" name until then.

== Services ==
Local passenger trains 795/796 operate on this line between Kujang Ch'ŏngnyŏn and Kusŏng.

== Route ==
A yellow background in the "Distance" box indicates that section of the line is not electrified.

Distance (km)		Station Name		Former Name		
Total	S2S	Transcribed	Chosŏn'gŭl (Hanja)	Transcribed	Chosŏn'gŭl (Hanja)	Connections
0.0	0.0	Kujang Ch'ŏngnyŏn	구장청년 (球場靑年)	Kujang	구장 (球場)	P'yŏngdŏk Line, Manp'o Line
12.5	12.5	Muksi	묵시 (墨時)			
16.7	4.2	Sao	사오 (沙烏)			
23.8	7.1	Hach'o	하초 (下草)			
31.6	7.8	Nyŏngbyŏn	녕변 (寧邊)			
40.1	8.5	P'arwŏn	팔원 (八院)			Pun'gang Line
~~45.4~~	~~5.3~~	Taejang	대장 (大將)			Closed
52.3	6.9	Sillyong	신룡 (新龍)			
59.8	7.5	Yŏnjung	연중 (延中)			Map'yŏng Line
64.8	5.0	T'aech'ŏn	태천 (泰川)			
~~80.7~~	~~15.9~~	Ŏmihyŏn	어미현 (魚尾峴)			Closed
~~86.9~~	~~6.2~~	Pongsan	봉산 (鳳山)			Closed
94.0	7.1	Kusŏng	구성 (龜城)	P'yŏngbuk Kusŏng	평북구성 (平北龜城)	P'yŏngbuk Line
