= Pyeongbuk Railway =

Japanese company in colonial Korea

Pyeongbuk Railway Co. Ltd.

Overview
- Native name: 평북철도주식회사 (Pyeongbuk Cheoldo Jusikhoesa) 平北鐵道株式會社 (Heihoku Tetsudō Kabushiki Kaisha)

The Pyeongbuk Railway (Japanese: 平北鐵道株式會社, Heihoku Tetsudō Kabushiki Kaisha; Korean: 평북철도주식회사, Pyeongbuk Cheoldo Jusikhoesa) was a privately owned railway company in Japanese-occupied Korea.

== History ==
The Pyeongbuk Railway opened its mainline, from Jeongju on the Chosen Government Railway's Gyeongseong—Sinuiju Gyeongui Line to Cheongsu on 27 September 1939 as an industrial railway to serve the Supung Hydroelectric Power Plant on the Yalu River, opening the Supung Line branch from Pupung on the mainline to the dam at the same time. At Cheongsu a bridge was built across the Yalu River to connect with the Fengshang Railway at Shanghekou, Manchukuo, and on 30 September 1940, the Pyeongbuk Railway opened the Supung Hoan Line.

After the partition of Korea the line was within the territory of the DPRK, and was nationalised by the Provisional People's Committee for North Korea along with all other railways in the Soviet zone of occupation on 10 August 1946, becoming the P'yŏngbuk Line of the Korean State Railway.

== Services ==
In the last timetable issued prior to the start of the Pacific War, the Pyeongbuk Railway had six daily passenger trains on the schedule, three round trips between Jeongju and Supung, and three between Cheongsu and Supung:

Jeongju - Supung
Distance (read down)	Price Korean yen	501	11	103	Station name	Distance (read up)	Price Korean yen	502	12	106
0.0	-	06:40	11:00	16:35	Jeongju	116.2	4.70	12:52	18:28	22:13
41.2	1.70	08:46	12:32	18:28	Pyeongbuk Guseong	75.0	3.00	11:27	15:20	21:00
116.6	4.70	12:12	15:20	21:54	Supung	0.0	-	07:50	14:10	17:50

Supung - Cheongsu
Distance (read down)	Price Korean yen	401	405	407	Station name	Distance (read up)	Price Korean yen	402	406	408
0.0	-	06:30	11:54	16:10	Supung	9.3	0.40	08:46	14:00	18:06
9.3	0.40	06:55	12:27	16:35	Cheongsu	0.0	-	08:18	13:32	17:34

== Rolling Stock ==
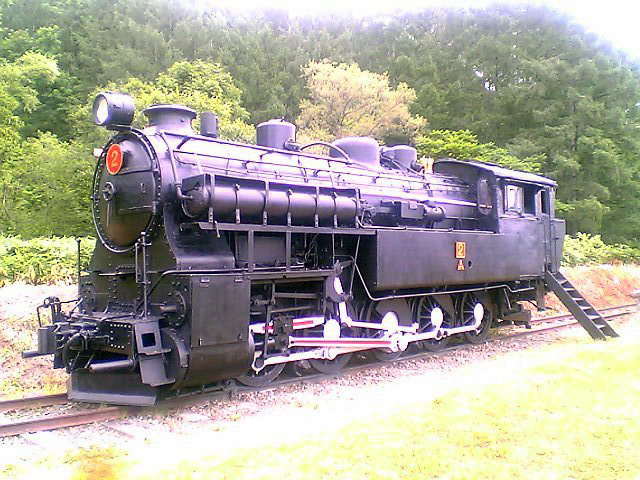
A Class 4110 locomotive preserved in Japan.

Four Class 4110 steam locomotives were sent from the Japanese Government Railway to the Pyeongbuk Railway after conversion to standard gauge.

== Network ==
平北線 - 평북선 - Heihoku Line - Pyeongbuk Line
Distance		Station name				
Total; km	S2S; km	Transcribed, Korean	Transcribed, Japanese	Hunminjeongeum	Hanja/Kanji	Connections
0.0	0.0	Jeongju	Jōshū	정주	定州	Sentetsu Gyeongui Line
10.4	10.4	Koan	Kōan	고안	高安	
16.5	6.1	Bongmyeong	Hōmei	봉명	鳳鳴	
28.4	11.9	Banghyeon	Hōken	방현	方峴	
41.2	12.8	Pyeongbuk Guseong	Heihoku Kujō	평북구성	平北亀城	
49.0	7.8	Baekun	Hakuun	백운	白雲	
63.9	14.9	Daean	Daiain	대안	大安	
70.5	6.6	Daegwan	Daikan	대관	大館	
78.2	7.7	Changpyeong	Shōhei	창평	昌坪	
91.2	13.0	Sakju Oncheon	Sakushū Onsen	삭주온천	朔州温泉	
100.0	8.8	Sakju	Sakushū	삭주	朔州	
105.9	5.9	Sin-an	Shin'an	신안	新安	
113.7	7.8	Bupung	Fūhō	부풍	富豊	Supung Line, Supung Hoan Line
120.5	6.8	Cheongsu	Shōsui	청수	青水	
		Amnokgang; Yalu River	Ōryokkō	압록강	鴨綠江	Korea-Manchukuo border
		Shanghekou	Shankōkō	-	上河口	Fengshang Railway

水豊線 - 수풍선 - Suihō Line - Supung Line
Distance		Station name				
Total; km	S2S; km	Transcribed, Korean	Transcribed, Japanese	Hunminjeongeum	Hanja/Kanji	Connections
0.0	0.0	Bupung	Fūhō	부풍	富豊	Pyeongbuk Line, Supung Hoan Line
2.5	2.5	Supung	Suihō	수풍	水豊	

水豊湖岸線 - 수풍호안선 - Suihō Kogan Line - Supung Hoan Line
Distance		Station name				
Total; km	S2S; km	Transcribed, Korean	Transcribed, Japanese	Hunminjeongeum	Hanja/Kanji	Connections
0.0	0.0	Bupung	Fūhō	부풍	富豊	Pyeongbuk Line, Supung Line
2.5	2.5	Supung Hoan	Suihō Kogan	수풍호안	水豊湖岸	
