= Chongsu station =

Railway station in North Korea

Ch'ŏngsu 청수
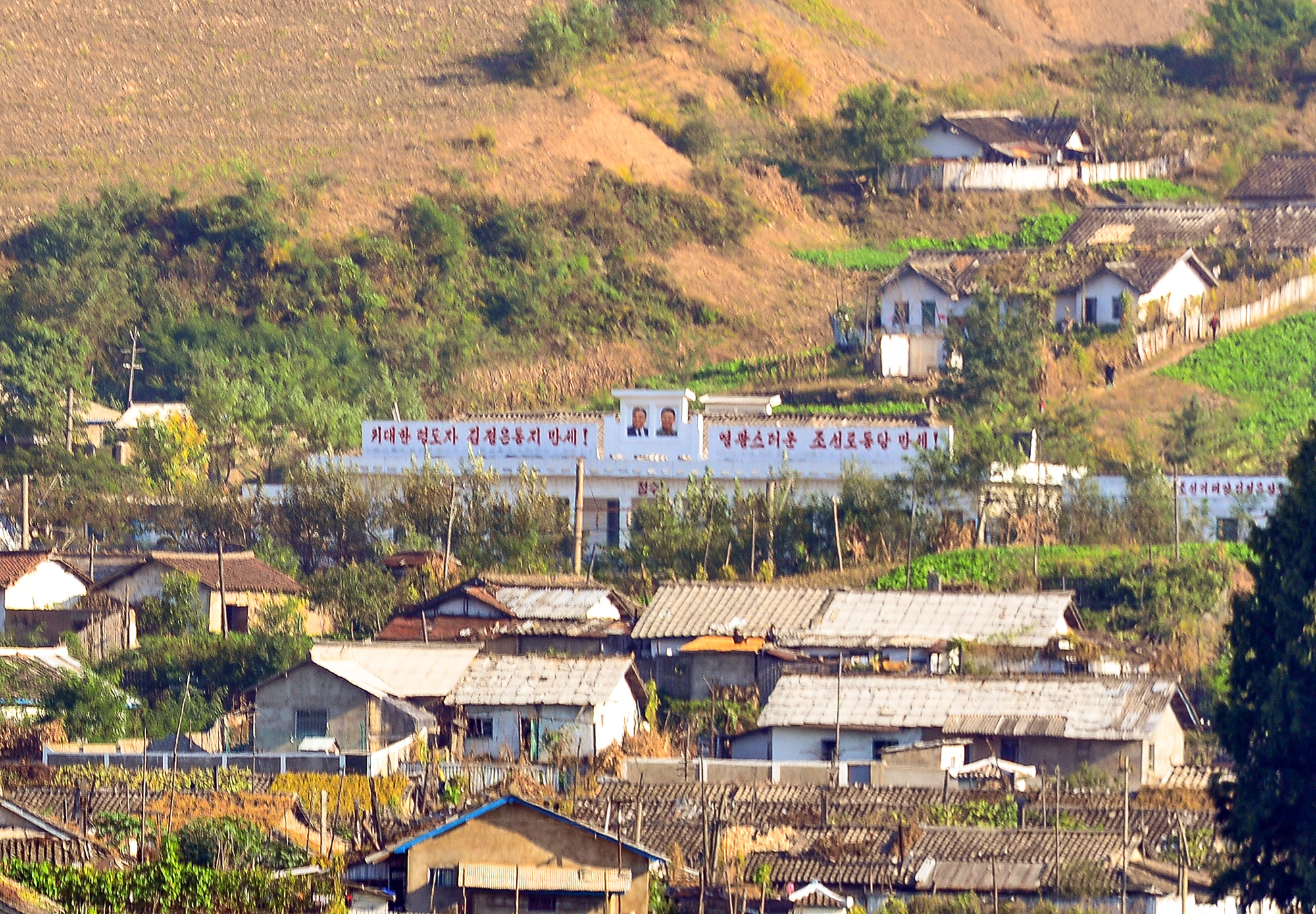
- View of the station building

Korean name
- Hangul: 청수역
- Hanja: 青水驛
- Revised Romanization: Cheongsu-yeok
- McCune–Reischauer: Ch'ŏngsu-yŏk

General information
- Location: Ch'ŏngsu-rodongjagu, Sakchu-gun, North P'yŏngan; North Korea
- Coordinates: 40.4593°N 124.8910°E
- Owner: Korean State Railway
- Platforms: 2 (1 island)
- Tracks: 5

History
- Opened: 27 September 1939
- Original company: Pyongbuk Railway

Services
Preceding station	Korean State Railway	Following station
Terminus	P'yŏngbuk Line	Pup'ung towards Ch'ŏngju Ch'ŏngnyŏn
Location

Ch'ŏngsu station is a railway station of the Korean State Railway in Ch'ŏngsu Workers' District, Sakchu County, North P'yŏngan Province, North Korea. It is the northern terminus of the P'yŏngbuk Line of the Korean State Railway. The line continues past the station to a factory at Namsal-li.

== History ==
Ch'ŏngsu station, along with the rest of the line, was opened by the Pyongbuk Railway on 27 September 1939.

== Services ==
Ch'ŏngsu station is served by semi-express trains 115/116 to and from P'yŏngyang, long-distance stopping trains 200/201 to and from West P'yŏngyang, as well as six pairs of commuter trains along the Ch'ongsu–Sup'ung–P'ungnyŏn route.
