= Chongju Chongnyon station =

Railway station in Chongju, North Korea

Chŏngju Ch'ŏngnyŏn 정주청년역
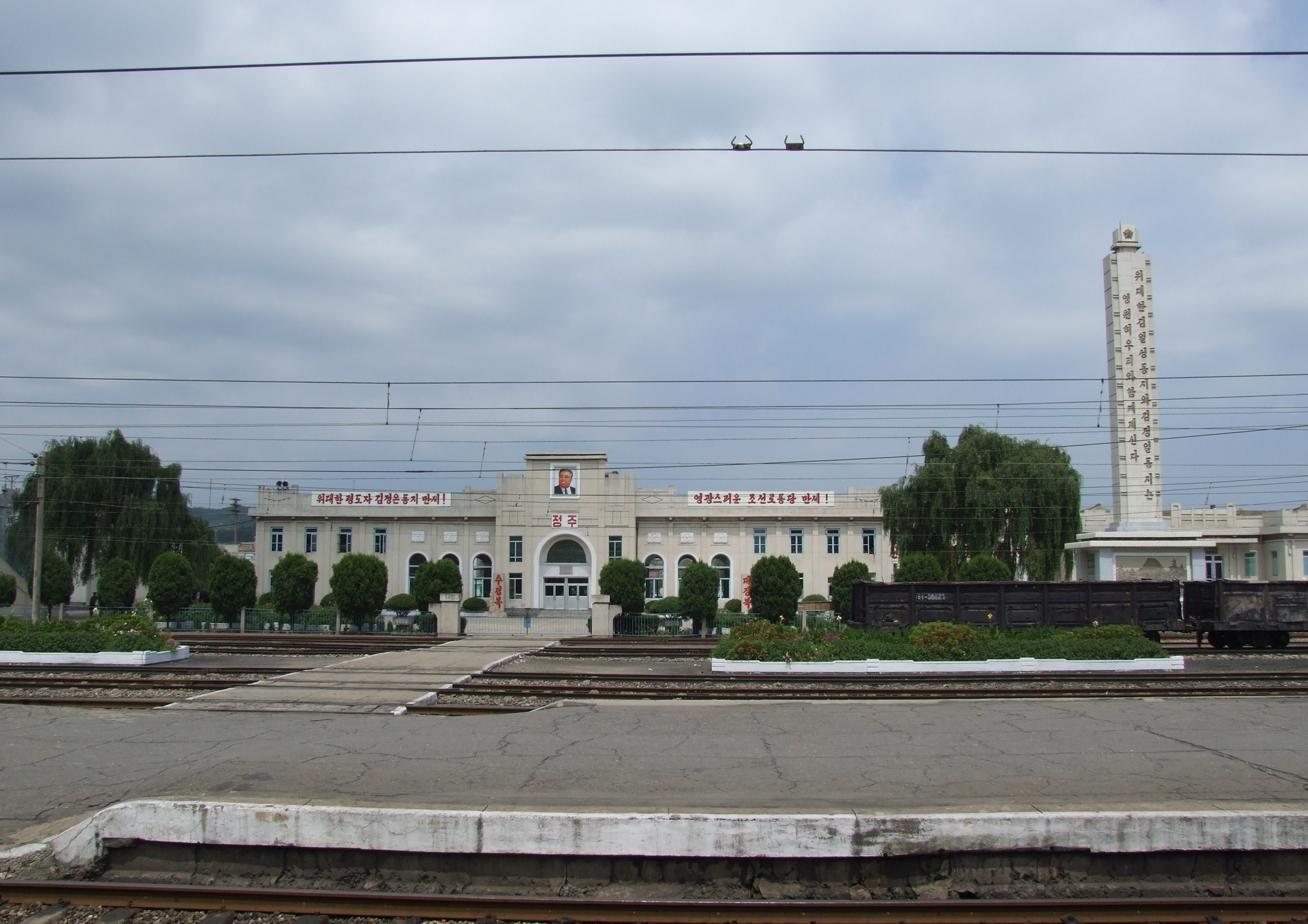
- Trackside view of Chŏngju Ch'ŏngnyŏn station

Korean name
- Hangul: 정주청년역
- Hanja: 定州靑年驛
- Revised Romanization: Jeongjucheongnyeon-yeok
- McCune–Reischauer: Chŏngjuch'ŏngnyŏn-yŏk

General information
- Location: Yŏkchŏn-dong, Chŏngju-si, North P'yŏngan Province; North Korea
- Coordinates: 39°41′11″N 125°12′56″E
- Owner: Korean State Railway
- Platforms: 4 (2 islands)
- Tracks: 11

History
- Opened: 5 November 1905
- Rebuilt: 1954
- Original company: Chosen Government Railway

Services
Preceding station	Korean State Railway	Following station
Hadan towards Dandong (China)	P'yŏngŭi Line	Koŭp towards P'yŏngyang
Pongmyŏng towards Ch'ŏngsu	P'yŏngbuk Line	Terminus
Location

Chŏngju Ch'ŏngnyŏn Station is a railway station in Yŏkchŏn-dong, Chŏngju city, North P'yŏngan Province, North Korea. It is the junction of the P'yŏngŭi and P'yŏngbuk lines of the Korean State Railway.

== History ==
The station was opened, along with the rest of this section of the Kyŏngŭi Line, on 5 November 1905.

After the bridge across the Yalu River was opened on 1 November 1911, connecting Sinŭiju to Dandong, China, Chŏngju station became a stop for international trains to and from Manchuria. It is still a stopping point for international trains between P'yŏngyang and Beijing.

Destroyed during the Korean War, the station was rebuilt after the end of the war by Youth Shock Troops, and was renamed Chŏngju Ch'ŏngnyŏn station (= Chŏngju Youth) at that time.

A major accident occurred at the station on 27 January 2008, when ten cars of a freight train derailed, killing two railway workers. After the accident, improvements were made to the station and its buildings in addition to the repair work.
