= Kujang County =

Coordinates: 39°52′02″N 126°01′41″E

Kujang County 구장군
- County

Korean transcription(s)
  - Chosŏn'gŭl: 구장군
  - Hanja: 球場郡
  - McCune–Reischauer: Kujang-gun
  - Revised Romanization: Gujang-gun
- Map of North Pyongan showing the Location of Kujang
- Country: North Korea
- Province: North P'yŏngan
- Administrative divisions: 1 ŭp, 5 rodongjagu, 22 ri

Area
  - Total: 584 km^{2} (225 sq mi)

Population (2008)
  - Total: 139,337

Kujang County is a kun, or county, in southeastern North P'yŏngan province, North Korea. It was created in 1952 from part of Nyŏngbyŏn county, as part of a nationwide reorganization of local government. It borders Nyŏngbyŏn on the west, Hyangsan and Unsan counties on the north, Nyŏngwŏn on the east, and Kaech'ŏn and Tŏkch'ŏn cities to the south.

== History ==
Kujang County was formed in 1952 from the split of Nyongbyon County.

== Geography ==
The Myohyang Mountains stretch across the eastern part of Kujang. The highest point is Kalbong (칼봉, 1530 m) in the north. The Ch'ŏngch'ŏn River flows through the centre of the county, and the Kuryong River flows along its western flank. Due to the mountainous terrain, only 17% of the county's land is cultivated, while 74% is occupied by forestland.

== Administrative divisions ==
Kujang county is divided into 1 ŭp (town), 5 rodongjagu (workers' districts) and 22 ri (villages):

	Chosŏn'gŭl	Hanja
Kujang-ŭp	구장읍	球場邑
Ryongch'ŏl-lodongjagu	룡철로동자구	龍鐵勞動者區
Ryongdŭng-rodongjagu	룡등로동자구	龍登勞動者區
Ryongmul-lodongjagu	룡문로동자구	龍門勞動者區
Ryongsu-rodongjagu	룡수로동자구	龍水勞動者區
Tŭngrip-rodongjagu	등립로동자구	登立勞動者區
Chosal-li	조산리	造山里
Chungch'o-ri	중초리	中草里
Hach'o-ri	하초리	下草里
Hajang-ri	하장리	下長里
Kaehwa-ri	개화리	開華里
Kwisang-ri	귀상리	貴祥里
Muksi-ri	묵시리	墨時里
Ryongyŏl-li	룡연리	龍淵里
Sambong-ri	삼봉리	三峰里
Sangch'o-ri	상초리	上草里
Sang'i-ri	상이리	上耳里
Sanggu-ri	상구리	上九里
Sao-ri	사오리	沙烏里
Sinhŭng-ri	신흥리	新興里
Somil-li	소민리	蘇民里
Song'o-ri	송호리	松湖里
Sugu-ri	수구리	水口里
Taep'ung-ri	대풍리	大豊里
To'gwal-li	도관리	都館里
Unhŭng-ri	운흥리	雲興里
Ullyong-ri	운룡리	雲龍里
Uhyŏl-li	우현리	牛峴里

== Climate ==
The average annual temperature is 8.4 °C, with a January mean of -10.4 °C and an August mean of 24.2 °C. The average annual rainfall is 1300 mm, making for a comparatively cool and wet climate.

== Caverns ==
The caves in the Kujang area are karstic grottoes formed during the Quaternary of the Cenozoic Era in limestone formations. Despite similar origins, they vary in size, scope, and aesthetic features due to karstic evolution. Ryongmun Cavern, located 370 meters above sea level, stretches 7 km with stalagmites and stalactites. Paekryong Cavern, 470 meters above sea level, features animal-shaped formations and stone columns. Kaechon Flower Cave is known for its "sea of flowers" made of mineral-rich stone.

== Economy ==
Zinc, coal, and mica are mined in the district. Factories produce cement and rail cars. There are agricultural areas along the Chongchon and Kuryong rivers.

In 2019, the Kujang Youth No.1 Hydropower station opened. Prior to opening, the generator room was flooded in a storm, although the generators were not yet installed at that time. Kujang Youth No.2 Hydropower station is under construction.

== Transportation ==
The Manp'o, P'yŏngdŏk and Ch'ŏngnyŏn P'arwŏn lines of the Korean State Railway intersect in Kujang, along with various branch lines serving the county's mines. The Pyongyang-Hyangsan tourist road and several other first-class roads pass through the county.

A former trolleybus system existed in Ryongdung-rodongjagu from the 1970s, connecting the workers' village to the nearby mine. Two trolleybuses serviced the route.

== See also ==
- Geography of North Korea
- Administrative divisions of North Korea
